= Prince Ludwig Gaston of Saxe-Coburg and Gotha =

German prince (1870–1942)

Prince Ludwig Gaston
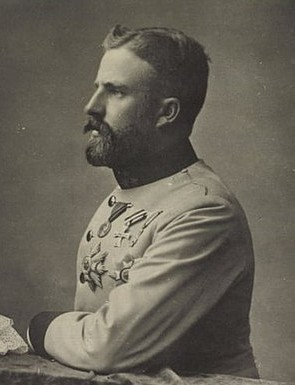
- Born: Prinz Ludwig Gaston von Sachsen-Coburg und Gotha, Herzog von Sachsen; 15 September 1870; Ebenthal, Lower Austria, Austria-Hungary
- Died: 23 January 1942 (aged 71); Innsbruck, Nazi Germany
- Burial: St. Augustin, Coburg
- Spouse: Princess Mathilde of Bavaria (m. 1900; died 1906) Countess Anna of Trauttmansdorff-Weinsberg (m. 1907)
- Issue: Prince Antonius of Saxe-Coburg and Gotha; Princess Maria Immaculata of Saxe-Coburg and Gotha; Princess Josefine of Saxe-Coburg and Gotha
Names
- Ludwig Gaston Klemens Maria Michael Gabriel Raphael Gonzaga
- House: Saxe-Coburg and Gotha-Koháry
- Father: Prince Ludwig August of Saxe-Coburg and Gotha
- Mother: Princess Leopoldina of Brazil

Prince Ludwig Gaston of Saxe-Coburg and Gotha (Ludwig Gaston Klemens Maria Michael Gabriel Raphael Gonzaga; 15 September 1870 – 23 January 1942), known in Brazil as Dom Luís Gastão, was a German prince of the House of Saxe-Coburg and Gotha-Koháry, and the last surviving grandchild of Emperor Pedro II of Brazil.

== Biography ==
=== Early life ===
Ludwig Gaston was born at Schloss Ebenthal in Ebenthal, Lower Austria, in Austria-Hungary, the youngest son of Prince Ludwig August of Saxe-Coburg and Gotha and Princess Leopoldina of Brazil, the second daughter of Emperor Dom Pedro II. His siblings were Princes Peter August, August Leopold and Joseph Ferdinand. Shortly after their mother's death in 1871, Ludwig and his brothers moved to Brazil, where they lived with their maternal grandfather until a military coup d'état in 1889 abolished the monarchy, forcing the imperial family into exile.

=== Military career ===
Ludwig Gaston went to Wiener Neustadt to study at the Theresian Military Academy, where he graduated in 1892. After that, he was promoted to the rank of Lieutenant of the Fourth Tiroler Jäger-Regiment of the Austro-Hungarian Army in Lienz. On 1 May 1896, Ludwig obtained the rank of First Lieutenant; on 29 March 1900, he was given command of the First Tiroler Jäger-Regiment in Innsbruck, and on 1 May 1903, he further advanced to the rank of Captain. He left the army on 8 February 1907.

=== First marriage and issue ===
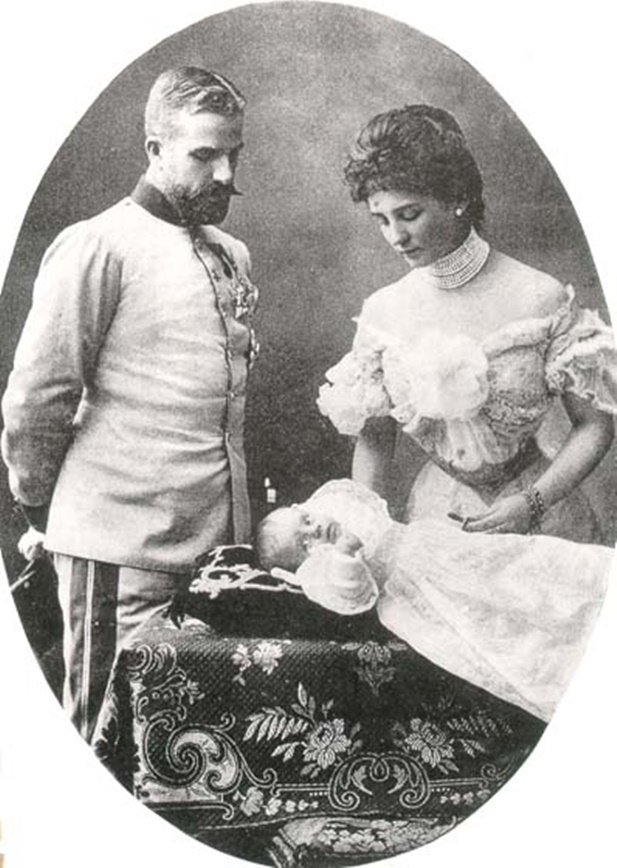
Ludwig with his wife Mathilde and their son

In Munich, on 1 May 1900, the prince married Princess Mathilde, daughter of King Ludwig III of Bavaria. Their wedding was hosted by her grandfather, Luitpold, Prince Regent of Bavaria. They had two children, a son and a daughter:

- Antonius Maria Ludwig Klemens Eugen Karl Heinrich August Luitpold Leopold Franz Wolfgang Peter Gaston Alexander Alfons Ignatius Aloysius Stanislaus (Innsbruck, 17 June 1901 – Haar, 1 September 1970), married morganatically on 14 May 1938 to an Austrian Luise Mayrhofer (1903–1974), daughter of Alois Mayrhofer and Therese Leicht, without issue.
- Maria Immaculata Leopoldine Franziska Theresia Ildefonsa Adelgunde Klementine Hildegard Anna Josepha Elisabeth Sancta-Angelica Nicoletta (Innsbruck, 10 September 1904 – Varese, Italy, 18 March 1940), unmarried and without issue.

=== Second marriage and issue ===
Coat of arms of the Trauttmansdorff-Weinsberg family

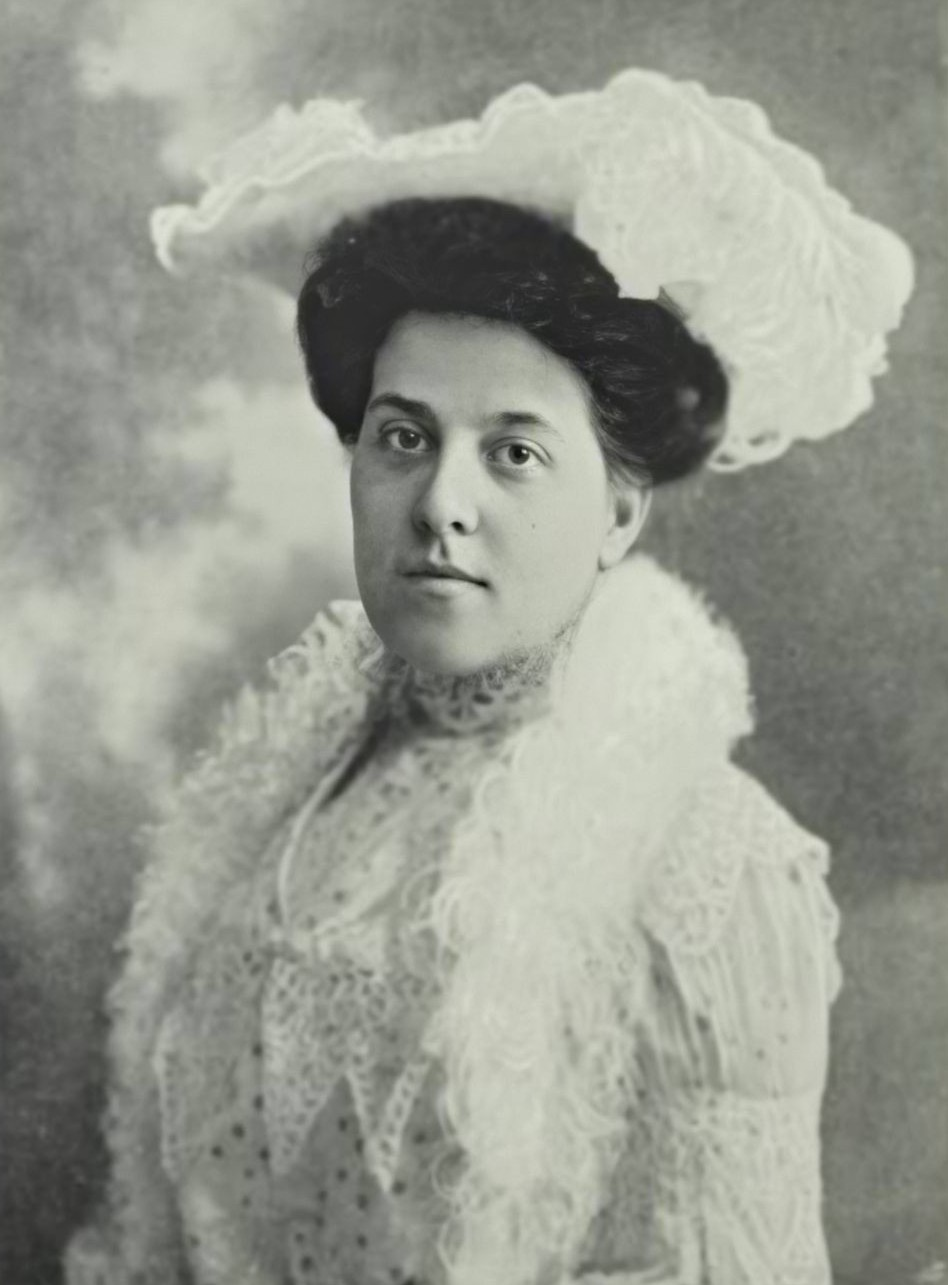
Countess Anna of Trauttmansdorff, 1916

After the death of his first wife in 1906, he married for a second time to Countess Anna of Trauttmansdorff-Weinsberg (1873–1948), daughter of Karl Johann Nepomuk Ferdinand, Prince von und zu Trauttmansdorff-Weinsberg and his wife Josephine, Markgräfin von Pallavicini, (1849–1923) at Bischofteinitz on 30 November 1907.

By birth, Anna was member of an ancient House of Trauttmansdorff-Weinsberg, one of the most prominent Austrian princely families. The couple were distantly related, both descending from Ferdinand August, Fürst von Lobkowicz.

Together, they had one daughter:

- Josefine Maria Anna Leopoldine Amalie Klementine Ludovica Theresia Gabriela Gonzaga (Schloß Vogelsang, 20 September 1911–Stockdorf, 27 November 1997), married on 12 May 1937, as his second wife, to Richard, Freiherr von Baratta-Dragono (1901–1998), second son of Richard, Freiherr von Baratta-Dragono (1867–1946) and his wife, Countess Karoline von Haugwitz (1872–1956) with issue; divorced in 1945. The couple were distantly related: they were both descended from Rudolph von Wrbna-Freudenthal (1761–1823) and his wife, Countess Maria Theresia von Kaunitz-Rietberg-Questenberg (1763–1803).

=== Death ===
Prince Ludwig Gaston died on 23 January 1942 in Innsbruck, Austria, at the age of 71. His body was buried in the St. Augustine's Church in Coburg, Upper Franconia, Bavaria, Germany.

== Honours ==
Styles of Prince Ludwig Gaston
- Reference style: His Highness
- Spoken style: Your Highness

- Grand Cross of the Saxe-Ernestine House Order, 1892
- Knight of the Order of St. Hubert, 1900

== Ancestry ==
Ancestors of Prince Ludwig Gaston of Saxe-Coburg and Gotha

8. Prince Ferdinand of Saxe-Coburg and Gotha
4. Prince August of Saxe-Coburg and Gotha
9. Princess Maria Antonia Koháry of Csábrág and Szitnya
2. Prince Ludwig August of Saxe-Coburg and Gotha
10. Louis Philippe I of France
5. Princess Clémentine of Orléans
11. Princess Maria Amalia of Naples and Sicily
1. Prince Ludwig Gaston of Saxe-Coburg and Gotha
12. Pedro I of Brazil and IV of Portugal
6. Pedro II of Brazil
13. Archduchess Leopoldina of Austria
3. Princess Leopoldina of Brazil
14. Francis I of the Two Sicilies
7. Princess Teresa Cristina of the Two Sicilies
15. Infanta Maria Isabella of Spain

== Bibliography ==
- Defrance, Olivier. La Médicis des Cobourg, Clémentine d’Orléans, Bruxelles, Racine, 2007 (ISBN 2873864869)
- Bragança, Dom Carlos Tasso de Saxe-Coburgo e. A Princesa Leopoldina, in Revista do Instituto Histórico e Geográfico Brasileiro, vol. 243, 1959 (ISSN 0101-4366)
- Bragança, Dom Carlos Tasso de Saxe-Coburgo e. Palácio Leopoldina, in Revista do Instituto Histórico e Geográfico Brasileiro, vol. 438, 2008 (ISSN 0101-4366)
