= Prince Peter August of Saxe-Coburg and Gotha =

Prince Peter August
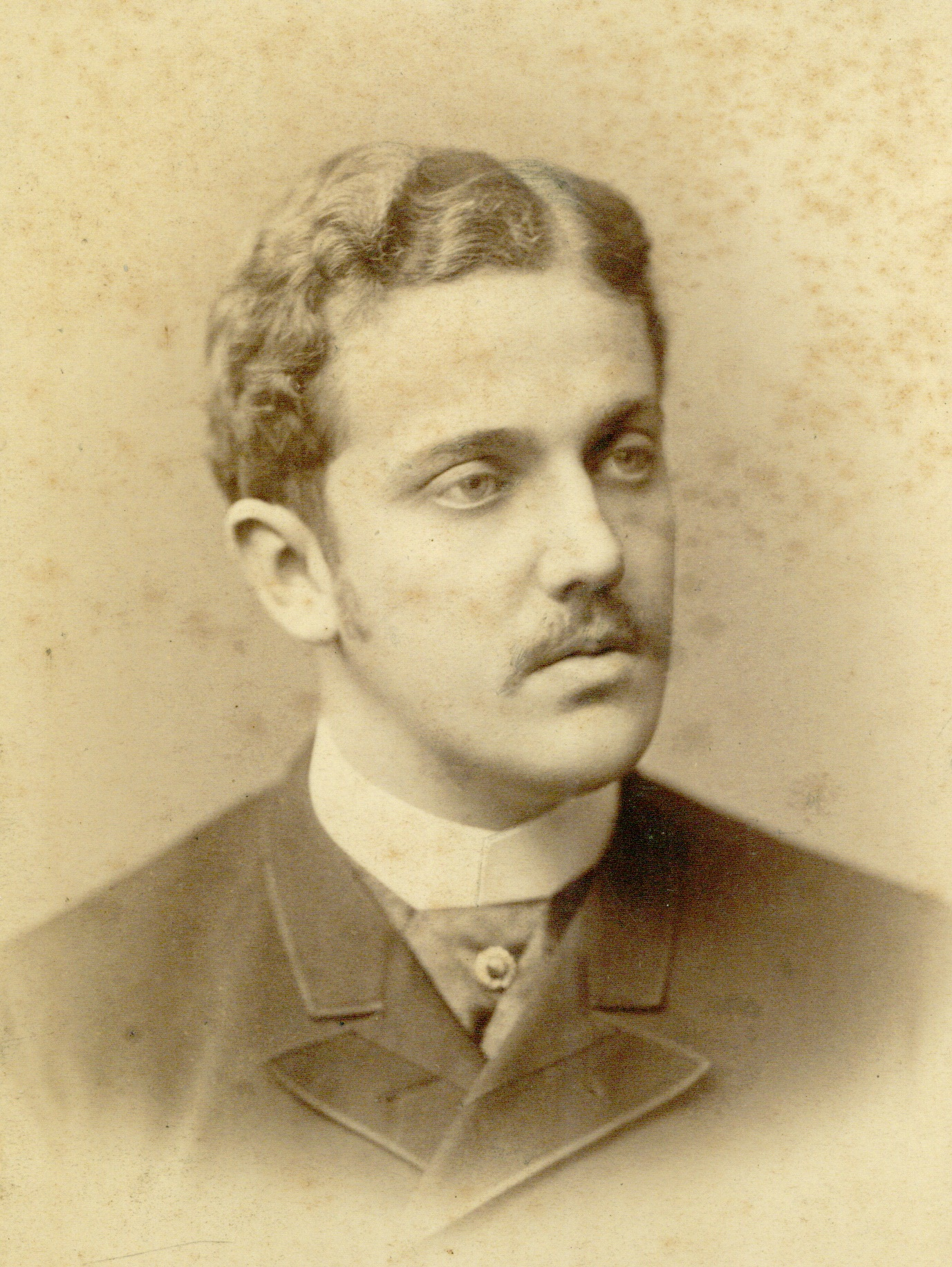
- Peter August in 1888

Head of the House of Saxe-Coburg and Gotha-Koháry
- Tenure: 3 July 1921 – 6 July 1934
- Predecessor: Prince Philipp
- Successor: Prince Rainer
- Born: Prinz Peter August von Sachsen-Coburg und Gotha, Herzog zu Sachsen; 19 March 1866; Leopoldina Palace, Rio de Janeiro, Empire of Brazil
- Died: 6 July 1934 (aged 68); Tulln an der Donau, Austria
- Burial: St. Augustin, Coburg
Names
- Pedro Augusto Luís Maria Miguel Gabriel Rafael Gonzaga
- House: Saxe-Coburg and Braganza
- Father: Prince Ludwig August of Saxe-Coburg and Gotha
- Mother: Princess Leopoldina of Brazil

Prince Peter August of Saxe-Coburg and Braganza (Portuguese: Pedro Augusto Luís Maria Miguel Gabriel Rafael Gonzaga; 19 March 1866 – 6 July 1934), known in Brazil as Dom Pedro Augusto, was a prince of the Empire of Brazil and of the Saxe-Coburg and Braganza branch of the Brazilian Imperial Family. The favorite grandson of Emperor Pedro II, he was known as "the Preferred" (Portuguese: O Preferido).

== Biography ==
=== Family and early years ===
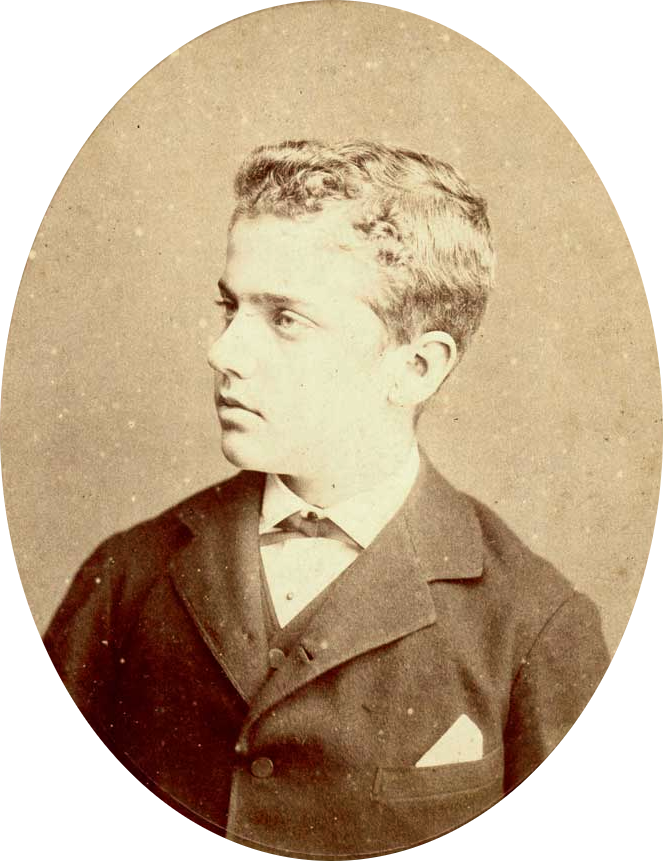
Prince Pedro Augusto aged 11, 1877

The eldest son of Prince Ludwig August of Saxe-Coburg and Gotha, and of Princess Leopoldina of Brazil, Dom Pedro Augusto was also the first grandson of Emperor Dom Pedro II of Brazil and Empress Teresa Cristina. His paternal grandparents were Prince August of Saxe-Coburg and Gotha and Princess Clémentine of Orléans (daughter of King Louis Philippe I of France).

Due to the lack of heirs by the Princess Imperial and the miscarriage suffered by Dona Leopoldina in her first pregnancy, there were high expectations surrounding the birth of Dom Pedro Augusto. On the eve of the birth, the Council of Ministers as well as representatives of the legislative, the Grandees of the Empire and the entire diplomatic corps were alerted to the big event. Pedro Augusto was born at 16:10 on 19 March 1866 at the Leopoldina Hall; his birth was announced with three rockets fired from the Imperial Palace of São Cristóvão, followed by volleys of guns of the forts and ships anchored in the bar. The baptism was held in April in the Imperial Chapel. In the Speech from the Throne on 3 May that year, the emperor made reference to the happy event.

By virtue of the marriage contract between Princess Leopoldina and Prince Ludwig August, the couple undertook to reside part of the year in Brazil as the emperor did not consider the succession of Princess Isabel as assured. Dom Pedro Augusto spent part of his early childhood in Brazil and part in Europe. A few weeks after the birth of her fourth and last son, Dom Luís Gastão, Dona Leopoldina contracted typhoid fever and died in Vienna on 7 February 1871, at twenty-three years of age. That same year, the Imperial couple made their first visit to Europe, where a family council decided that Dom Pedro Augusto and his brother, Dom Augusto Leopoldo, would return to Brazil to be raised by his maternal grandparents.

At the request of the Emperor, doctor Manuel Pacheco da Silva (the future Baron of Pacheco) left his position as dean of Externato Dom Pedro II to become tutor to the Emperor's grandchildren, because they "(...) are lagging badly in speaking Portuguese, only know the German language." At the age of eight, the young prince was enrolled at the Pedro II Imperial School, becoming a Bachelor of Science and Letters in 1881. On 1 April 1887 he graduated in Civil Engineering from Polytechnical School, having already delivered a lecture on Académie des Sciences. A scholar like his grandfather, Pedro Augusto was a member of the Institut de France and author of several works on mineralogy, taken today as gems.

=== The imperial succession ===
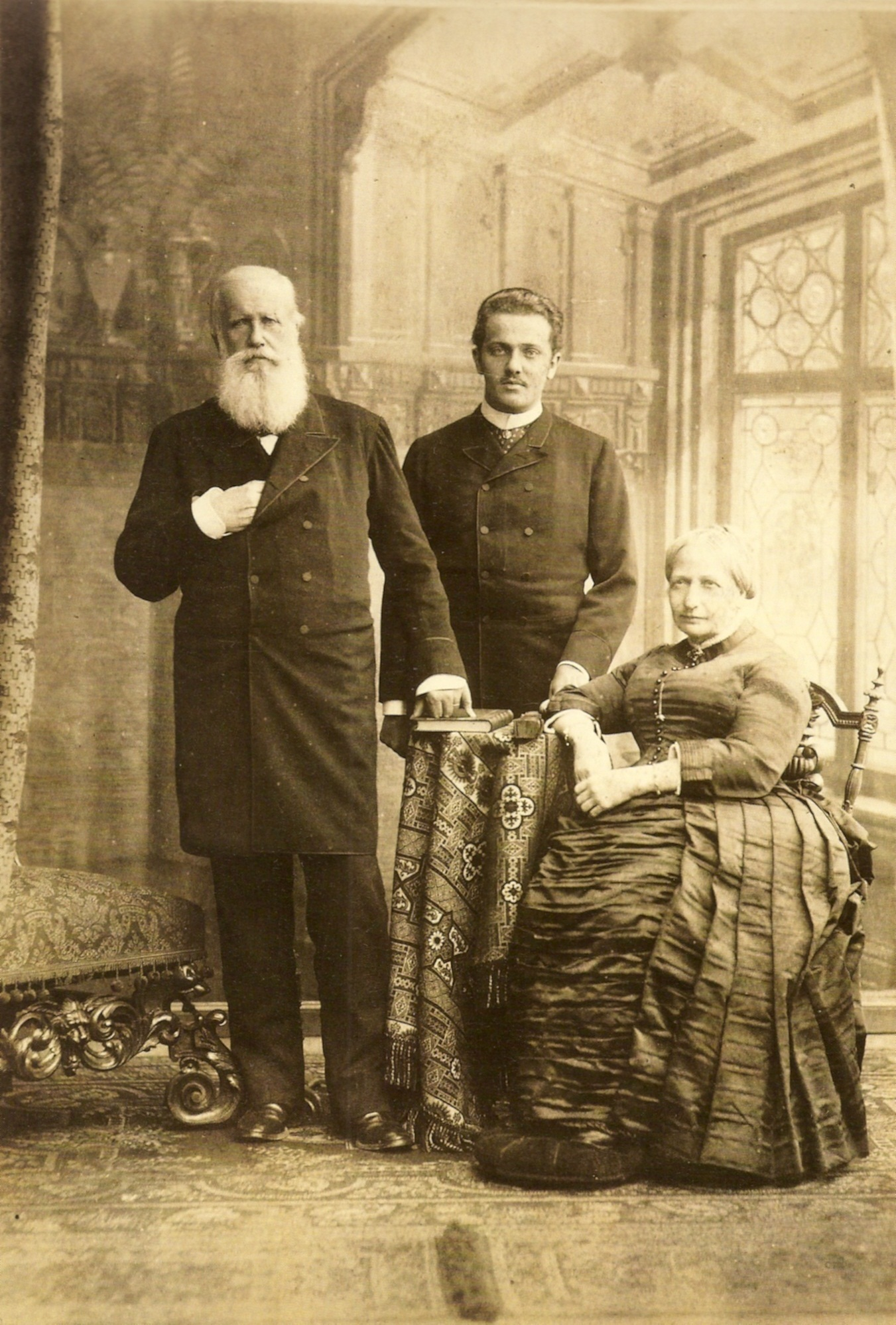
Prince Pedro Augusto with his maternal grandparents, Emperor Pedro II and Empress Teresa Cristina of Brazil, 1887

The apparent infertility of Princess Dona Isabel meant that Pedro Augusto was considered the heir apparent since the day of his birth. However, at nine years of age, the prince found himself sliding down in the line of succession, due to the birth of his cousin Dom Pedro de Alcântara, who held the title of Prince of Grão-Pará.

This change of circumstances is said to have affected the behaviour of Pedro Augusto considerably. After the birth of his cousin and throughout his adolescence, the prince suffered from insomnia, intense headaches, palpitations, and hand tremors. His recurring fear of death (fearing to be infected with the same disease that killed his mother) became a source of concern for his father.

Installed in Leopoldina Palace, an annex of the Imperial Palace, the prince became quite popular, holding receptions and banquets, even to the point of forming an informal court around him. The sums of money which he required from his father increased considerably, leading Luís Augusto asking for explanations from the emperor.

The preference of the emperor for his eldest grandson caused jealousy in the Princess Imperial and fed the speculation about a turnaround in the line of succession. Diplomatic correspondences allow an insight into family divisions. The alleged religious fanaticism and the policies of Dona Isabel ended up creating a climate in which a faction of the elite favoured a future Third Reign by Dom Pedro Augusto.

The "Conspirator Prince", as he was called in Parliament, had, according to his contemporaries, active participation in the campaign that intended to promote him to the throne instead of his aunt and cousin. His greatest mentor in these affairs, and one of its most enthusiastic promoters, was the counselor Sousa Dantas, president of the Council of Ministers between 1884 and 1885. In Europe, where he was with his grandparents between 1887 and 1888, Eduardo Prado and the Baron of Estrela were propagating his virtues in contrast to the "defects" of Dona Isabel.

Indeed, on his European tour, in all countries and royal houses he visited, Dom Pedro Augusto was received with the pomp worthy of an heir to the throne. His popularity grew by leaps and bounds. In France he received the Grand Cross of the Legion of Honor; in Portugal, King Dom Luís I awarded him the Grand Cross of the Order of the Tower and Sword. His return to Brazil deepened the silent crisis within the Brazilian Imperial Family. Support for the prince grew in number and political weight: the Baron of Estrela, the Count of Figueiredo, the Marquis of Paranaguá - among other leading politicians - and even the empress herself became his partisans.

=== Republic and exile ===
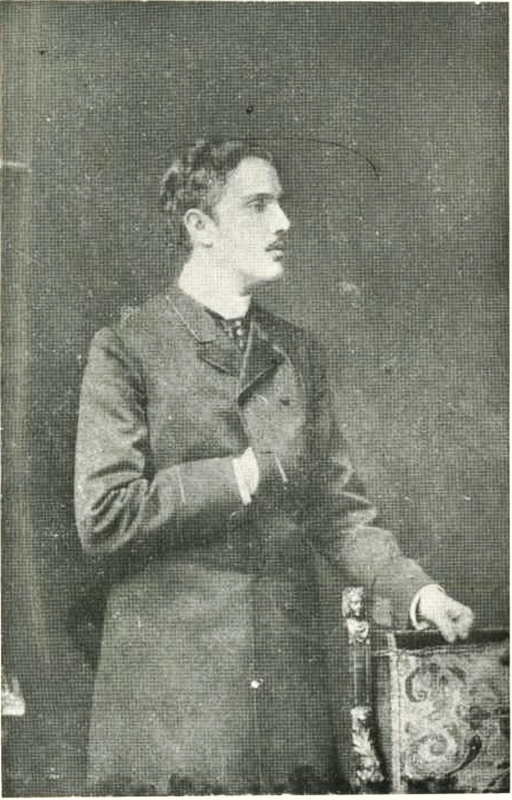
Prince Pedro Augusto in Paris during the exile of the Brazilian imperial family, 1890

Dom Pedro Augusto learned of the military coup that resulted in the Proclamation of the Republic hours after the incident, when returning from a horseback ride. Forced by the provisional government to go into exile, on 17 November, at dawn, all members of the Imperial family - with the exception of Dom Augusto, who was in circumnavigation with the Imperial Navy in the East - boarded the steamer Alagoas and were escorted by the battleship Riachuelo up to the limits of the Brazilian territorial waters. It was aboard the Alagoas that the Prince had his first psychotic break-down: he tried to strangle the captain, accusing him of having taken a bribe in order to kill everyone on board. Restrained and locked in his cabin, he was stricken with persecutory delusions, and ended up wrapping his body in a lifeguard buoy, fearing that the ship was being bombed. With alternating phases of excitement and lethargy, Pedro Augusto threw bottles overboard with requests for help. There are records of at least one of these messages, found in a bottle on Maragogi beach.

Having arrived in his European exile, Pedro Augusto was taken for psychiatric treatment in Graz, Austria. A few weeks later he was discharged and met with his grandparents when they received the news of the death of Dona Teresa Cristina, the only family member ally in his pretensions to the throne. With the move of the family to Cannes, he contacted old supporters and tried to plan the monarchical restoration in Brazil. However, his psychological situation deteriorated further, and the few monarchists still active soon withdrew their support from the prince.

=== Mental Health and death ===
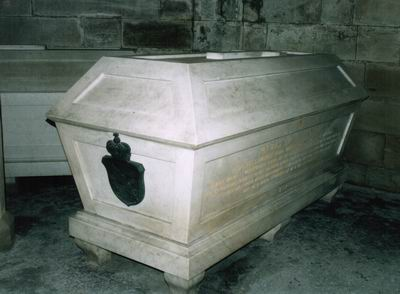
Tomb of Pedro Augusto at the St. Augustine's Church in Coburg, Germany.

Having been abandoned by the "pedristas", Pedro Augusto's psychiatric symptoms progressively worsened. His nights were sleepless, he did not eat, and he began babbling incomprehensible words or ranting against imaginary enemies. Often the servants of the Coburg Palace found him huddled in a corner with a glazed look and foaming at the mouth.

The few remaining friends tried in vain to help him. At the request of the physician Jean Charcot, the young man was examined by the famous Sigmund Freud, as evidenced by Augusto Leopoldo in a letter to the Baron de Santa Vitória:

I want to thank for the visit of the young Doctor Sigmund Freud sent by the good Dr. Jean Charcot. In his opinion, there was in my brother no monomaniac symptoms or uncontrolled excitement, constituting only a deep depression and unhappiness. What he felt is that he is exhausted, recommending, for now, plenty of rest.

Although his health showed signs of recovery, monarchists ended up investing their hopes and support in his brother as pretender to the throne. With the death of Dom Pedro II, on 5 December 1891, melancholy and mania returned. Pedro Augusto accused his aunt and uncle, Princess Isabel and the Count of Eu, of spreading rumours about his sanity; and he accused journalists of casting doubts on his masculinity.

In October 1893, articles published in French and Argentine newspapers recognized the status of his cousin Dom Pedro de Alcântara as the rightful claimant to the imperial throne. This led Pedro Augusto to the brink of collapse, and his old delusions returned. After being restrained and sent to the Coburg Palace again, he attempted suicide by throwing himself through one of the windows of his room.

Admitted by his father to a sanatorium in Tulln an der Donau, "The Preferred" spent the rest of his life believing that he would one day become Emperor of Brazil. On 25 April 1900 all of his personal belongings were auctioned off in Vienna. The prince died on 7 July 1934 at the age of 68, and after over four decades of hospitalization. His body was buried in the crypt of the Sankt-Augustin-Kirche in Coburg.

== Honours ==
Styles of Prince Pedro Augusto
- Reference style: His Highness
- Spoken style: Your Highness

Prince Pedro Augusto was a recipient of the following orders:

Brazilian honours

- Grand Cross of the Order of the Southern Cross
- Grand Cross of the Order of Pedro I
- Grand Cross of the Order of the Rose

Foreign honours

- Grand Cross of the Saxe-Ernestine House Order, 1884
- Grand Cross of the Order of Charles III, 21 July 1887
- Grand Cross of the Order of the Tower and Sword, 26 July 1888
- Grand Cross of the Order of Leopold
- Grand Cross of the Legion of Honour
- Grand Cross of the Order of St. Alexander

== Ancestry ==
Ancestors of Prince Peter August of Saxe-Coburg and Gotha

8. Prince Ferdinand of Saxe-Coburg and Gotha
4. Prince August of Saxe-Coburg and Gotha
9. Princess Maria Antonia Koháry of Csábrág and Szitnya
2. Prince Ludwig August of Saxe-Coburg and Gotha
10. Louis Philippe I of France
5. Princess Clémentine of Orléans
11. Princess Maria Amalia of Naples and Sicily
1. Prince Pedro Augusto of Saxe-Coburg and Gotha
12. Pedro I of Brazil and IV of Portugal
6. Pedro II of Brazil
13. Archduchess Leopoldina of Austria
3. Princess Leopoldina of Brazil
14. Francis I of the Two Sicilies
7. Princess Teresa Cristina of the Two Sicilies
15. Infanta Maria Isabella of Spain

== Bibliography ==
- Bragança, Dom Carlos Tasso de Saxe-Coburgo e. Palácio Leopoldina, in Revista do Instituto Histórico e Geográfico Brasileiro, vol. 438, 2008, pp. 281–300 (ISSN 0101-4366)
- Bragança, Dom Carlos Tasso de Saxe-Coburgo e. A Princesa Leopoldina, in Revista do Instituto Histórico e Geográfico Brasileiro, vol. 243, 1959, pp. 70–93 (ISSN 0101-4366)
- Bragança, Dom Carlos Tasso de Saxe-Coburgo e. As Visitas de Dom Pedro II a Coburgo, in Revista do Instituto Histórico e Geográfico Brasileiro, vol. 272, 1966, pp. 201–208 (ISSN 0101-4366)
- Bragança, Dom Carlos Tasso de Saxe-Coburgo e. Dom Pedro Augusto e seus contactos com a avó Clementina, Duquesa de Saxe, in Revista do Instituto Histórico e Geográfico Brasileiro, vol. 440, 2008, pp. 161–170 (ISSN 0101-4366)
- Bragança, Dom Carlos Tasso de Saxe-Coburgo e. Príncipe Dom Pedro Augusto de Saxe-Coburgo e Bragança e o "Leilão em Viena", in Revista do Instituto Histórico e Geográfico Brasileiro, vol. 422, 2004, pp. 205–259 (ISSN 0101-4366)
- Bragança, Dom Carlos Tasso de Saxe-Coburgo e. As confidências do Visconde de Itaúna a Dom Pedro II, in Revista do Instituto Histórico e Geográfico Brasileiro, vol. 424, 2004, pp. 89–161 (ISSN 0101-4366)
- Defrance, Olivier. La Médicis des Cobourg, Clémentine d’Orléans, Bruxelles, Racine, 2007 (ISBN 2873864869)
- Del Priore, Mary. O Príncipe Maldito, Rio de Janeiro, Objetiva, 2007 (ISBN 857302867X)
- Figueiredo Junior, Afonso Celso de Assis. Palavras do Conde de Affonso Celso sobre o falecimento do sócio honorário Dom Pedro Augusto de Saxe-Coburgo, in Revista do Instituto Histórico e Geográfico Brasileiro, vol. 169, 1934, pp. 429–430 (ISSN 0101-4366)
- Lessa, Clado Ribeiro de. O Segundo Ramo da Casa Imperial e a nossa Marinha de Guerra, in Revista do Instituto Historico e Geografico Brasileiro, vol. 211, 1951, pp. 118–133 (ISSN 0101-4366)
- Lyra, Heitor. História de Dom Pedro II - Declínio (1880-1891), Belo Horizonte, Itatiaia; São Paulo, Ed. da Universidade de São Paulo, 1977, p. 37, 173 (ISBN 9788531903571)
- Mello Jr, Donato. Centenário do Príncipe do Grão-Pará - O nascimento em Petrópolis e o batizado no Rio de Janeiro, in Revista do Instituto Histórico e Geográfico Brasileiro, vol. 322, 1979, pp. 212–228 (ISSN 0101-4366)
- Sessão em 21 de Março de 1866, in Annaes do Parlamento Brazileiro, Câmara dos Srs. Deputados, Quarto Ano da Duodécima Legislatura, Sessão de 1866, tomo 1, p. 42
- Sessão Imperial do Encerramento da Terceira e da Abertura da Quarta Sessão da Decima-Segunda Legislatura, in Annaes do Parlamento Brazileiro, Sessão de 1866, tomo 1
- Wehrs, Carlos. A Princesa Leopoldina de Bragança e Bourbon e a Casa Ducal de Saxe-Coburg, in Revista do Instituto Histórico e Geográfico Brasileiro, vol. 437, 2007, pp. 275–289 (ISSN 0101-4366)
