= Prince Joseph Ferdinand of Saxe-Coburg and Gotha =

German-Brazilian prince (1869–1888)

Prince Joseph Ferdinand
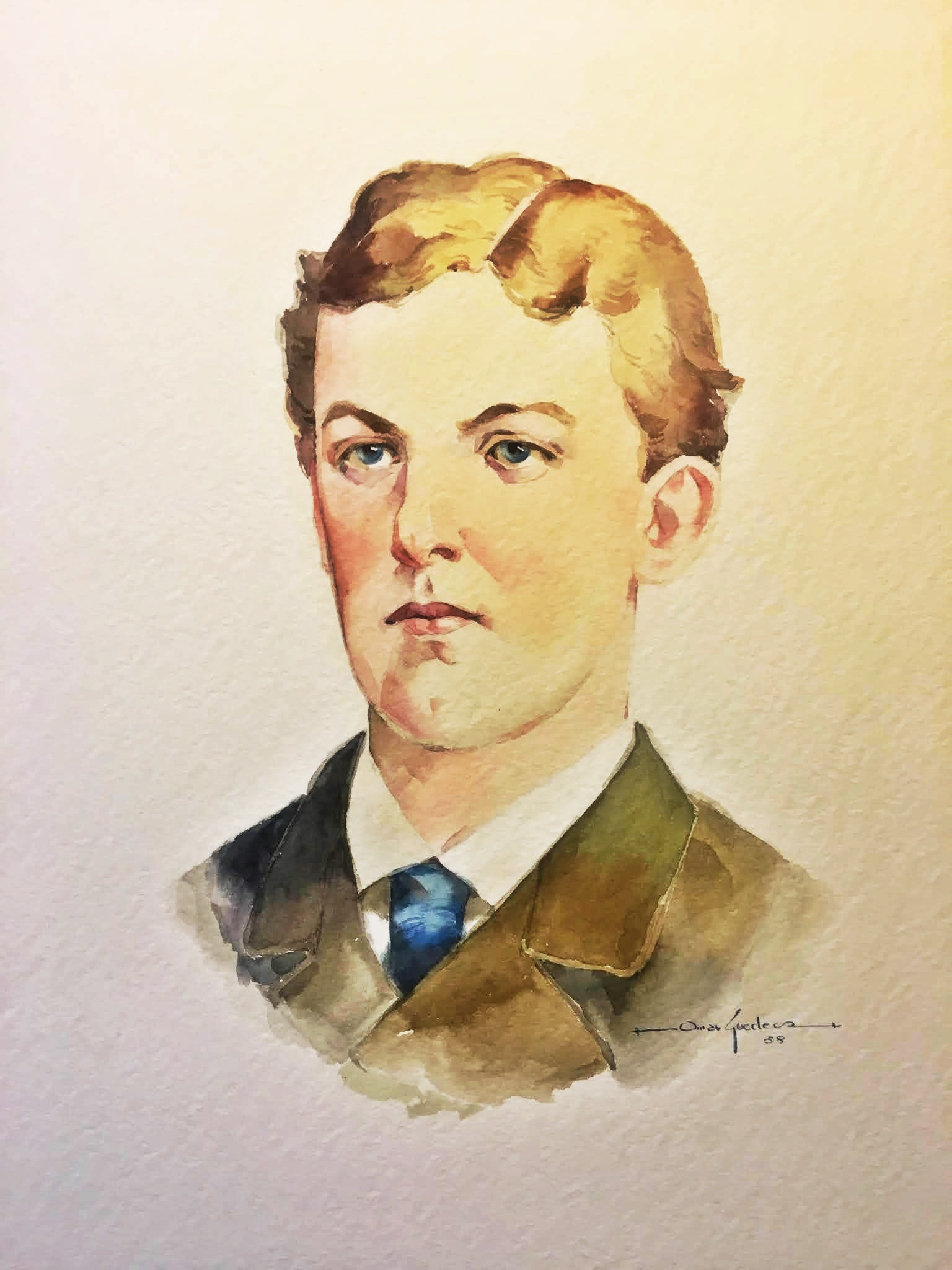
- Anonymous painting of Prince Joseph Ferdinand
- Born: Prinz Joseph Ferdinand von Sachsen-Coburg und Gotha, Herzog von Sachsen; 21 May 1869; Rio de Janeiro, Empire of Brazil
- Died: 13 August 1888 (aged 19); Wiener Neustadt, Austria-Hungary
- Burial: St. Augustin, Coburg
Names
- Joseph Ferdinand Maria Michael Gabriel Raphael Gonzaga
- House: Saxe-Coburg and Gotha-Koháry
- Father: Prince Ludwig August of Saxe-Coburg and Gotha
- Mother: Princess Leopoldina of Brazil

Prince Joseph Ferdinand of Saxe-Coburg and Gotha (full name Joseph Ferdinand Maria Michael Gabriel Raphael Gonzaga; 21 May 1869 – 13 August 1888), known in Brazil as Dom José Fernando, was a prince of the House of Saxe-Coburg and Gotha-Koháry. Born in Leopoldina Palace, Rio de Janeiro, he was the third son of Prince Ludwig August of Saxe-Coburg and Gotha and his wife Princess Leopoldina of Brazil. He died of pneumonia at the age of 19 in Wiener Neustadt and is buried at St. Augustin, Coburg.

== Ancestry ==
Ancestors of Prince Joseph Ferdinand of Saxe-Coburg and Gotha

8. Prince Ferdinand of Saxe-Coburg and Gotha
4. Prince August of Saxe-Coburg and Gotha
9. Princess Maria Antonia Koháry of Csábrág and Szitnya
2. Prince Ludwig August of Saxe-Coburg and Gotha
10. Louis Philippe I of France
5. Princess Clémentine of Orléans
11. Princess Maria Amalia of Naples and Sicily
1. Prince Joseph Ferdinand of Saxe-Coburg and Gotha
12. Pedro I of Brazil and IV of Portugal
6. Pedro II of Brazil
13. Archduchess Leopoldina of Austria
3. Princess Leopoldina of Brazil
14. Francis I of the Two Sicilies
7. Princess Teresa Cristina of the Two Sicilies
15. Infanta Maria Isabella of Spain
