= St. Augustin, Coburg =

St. Augustine's Church
- St. Augustin Kirche
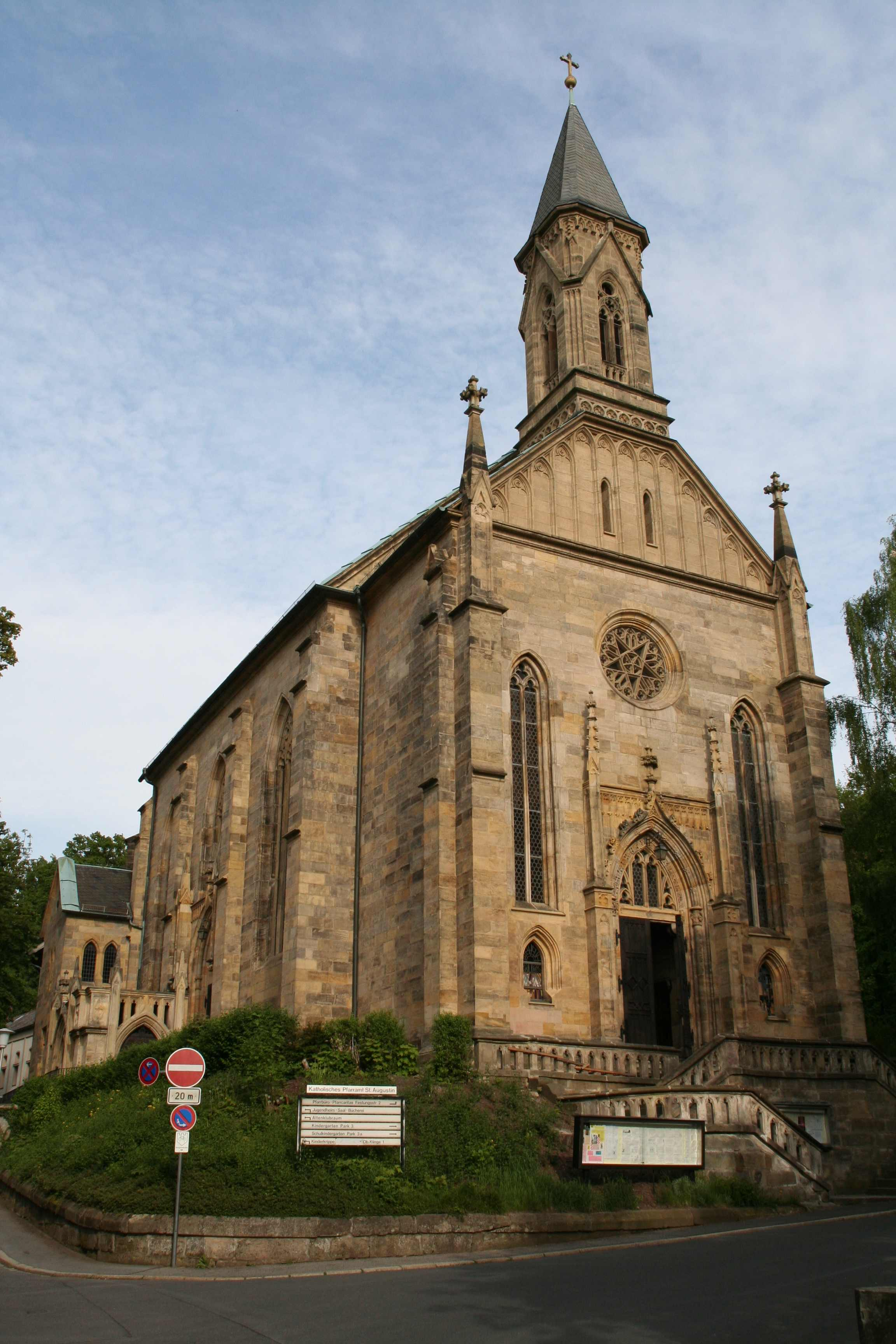
- St. Augustin (2006)

- Location within Bavaria Location within Germany
- 50°15′37″N 10°58′7″E
- Location: Festungsstrasse 1, Coburg
- Country: Germany
- Denomination: Roman Catholic

Architecture
- Functional status: Active
- Heritage designation: Listed monument
- Style: Gothic Revival
- Years built: 1856-60

St. Augustine's Church (German: St. Augustin) is a parish church of the Roman Catholic Archdiocese of Bamberg located in the Bavarian town of Coburg, Germany. It was built between 1856 and 1860. Originally designed in the Gothic Revival style, the church was remodelled in 1960 due to a liturgical reform. There is a crypt under the church that contains the remains of fifteen members of the Koháry branch of the House of Saxe-Coburg and Gotha, a Roman Catholic branch of the originally Protestant ducal house.

== History ==
After the Reformation, Catholic worship was curtailed in Coburg and the last service was held in 1582, at the Nikolaikapelle. It took almost three hundred years for a new Catholic parish to be reestablished in the town.

In 1851, a committee headed by Prince August of Saxe-Coburg and Gotha set out to plan the construction of a Roman Catholic church. His son, Prince Ludwig August, paid for the construction of a burial vault underneath the church. The vault was completed in 1858. The church was opened on 28 August 1860 (Augustine of Hippo's feast day) by the Archbishop of Bamberg Michael Deinlein.

On 15 July 1909, the Protestant Princess Beatrice of Saxe-Coburg and Gotha married the Roman Catholic Infante Alfonso, Duke of Galliera, in a civil ceremony at Schloss Rosenau, followed by a Roman Catholic religious ceremony at St. Augustin and a Lutheran one in Schloss Callenberg.

After Coburg joined Bavaria in 1920, the parish St. Augustin was assigned to the Archbishop of Bamberg.

== Burials ==
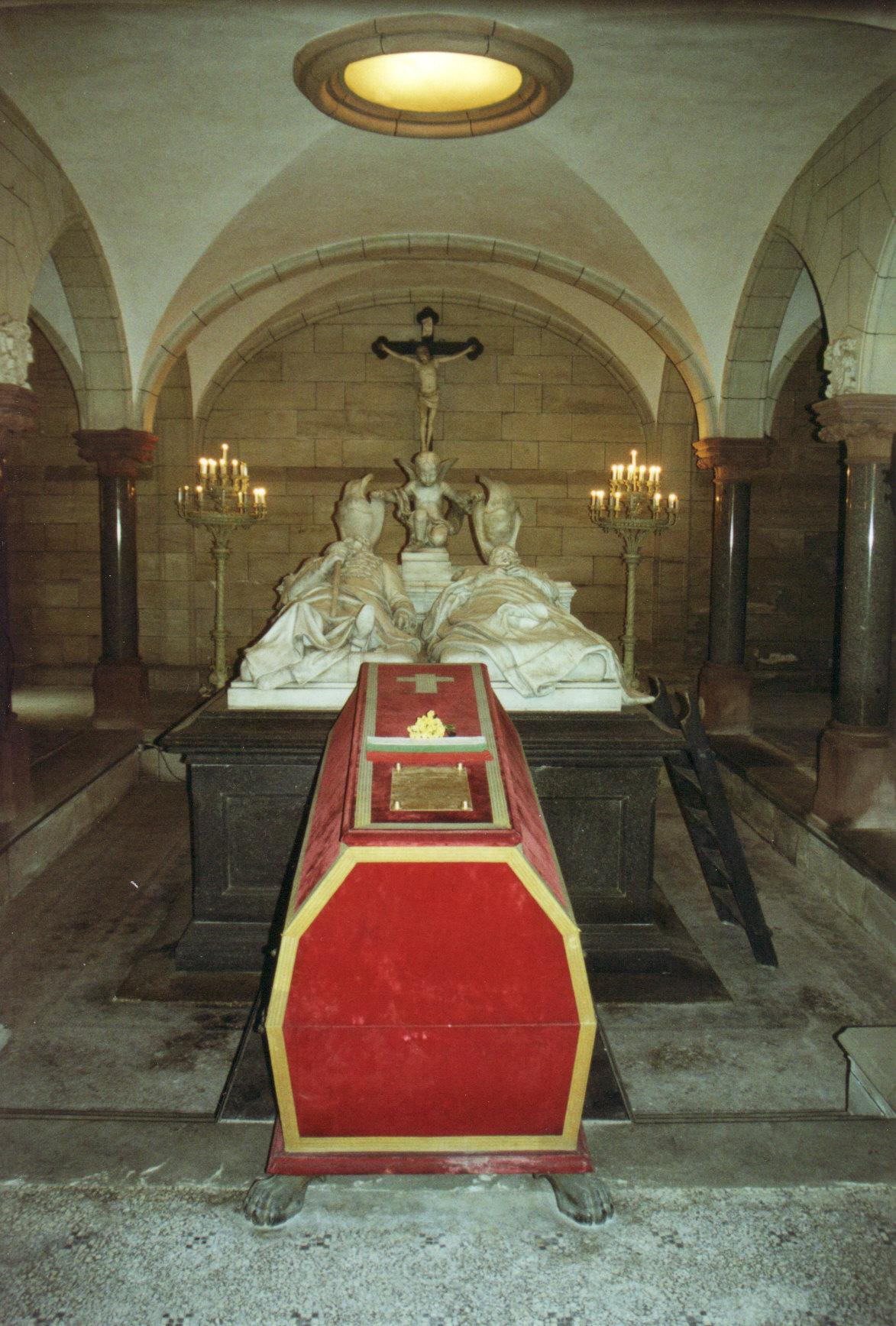
Tombs of Tsar Ferdinand, Prince August and Princess Clémentine

Prince August and his wife, Princess Clémentine of Orléans, are buried in a double sarcophagus on the right side of the vault. In 1948, the remains of their youngest son, Tsar Ferdinand of Bulgaria, were placed at their feet., and remained there until 2024, when Ferdinand's remains were reburied in Bulgaria. Twelve more members of the House of Saxe-Coburg and Gotha are buried on the left side of the vault. Prince Ludwig August (second son of August and Clémentine) and his wife, Princess Leopoldina of Brazil, are buried alongside their sons – Peter, August Leopold and Joseph Ferdinand. The remains of Prince August Leopold's teenage son August Clemens were interred in the vault in 1908. A few years later, his remains were joined by those of his murdered cousin, Prince Leopold Clemens. The remains of August and Clémentine's eldest son and Leopold Clemens' father, Prince Philipp, can also be found on the left side of the vault. The remains of Philipp's daughter Dorothea and those of Ludwig Gaston (son of Ludwig August and Leopoldina), Ludwig Gaston's second wife, Maria Anna Trauttmansdorff-Weinsberg, and August Leopold's daughter Maria Karoline are located in the lower part of the vault's left side. August Leopold's son Prince Rainer is also buried there.
