= Mariana Carlota de Verna Magalhães Coutinho, Countess of Belmonte =

Mariana de Verna Magalhães
- Countess of Belmonte
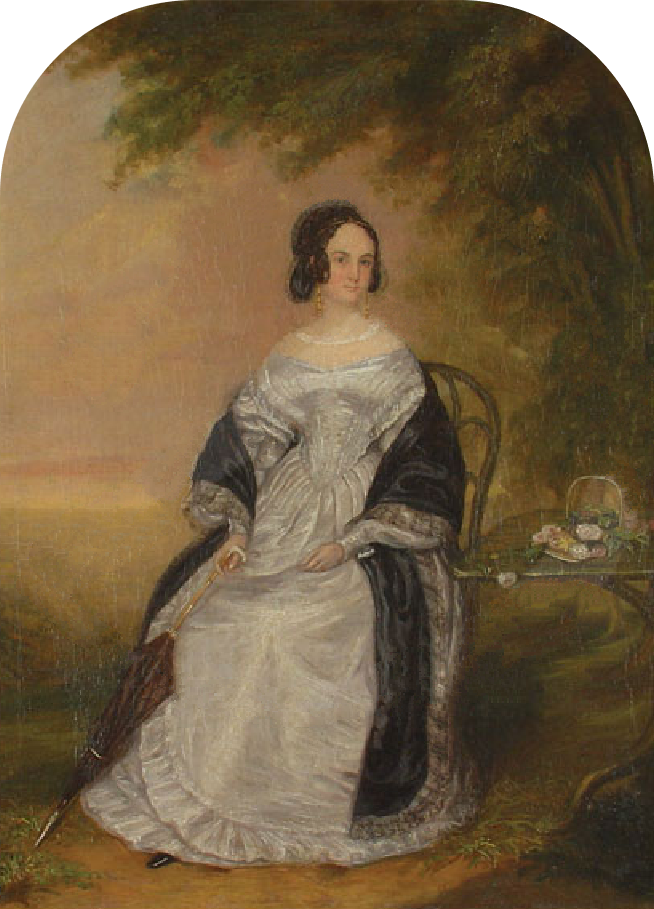
- 19th century portrait of Verna
- Born: 5 February 1779; Elvas, Portalegre, Kingdom of Portugal
- Died: 17 October 1855 (aged 76); Rio de Janeiro, Empire of Brazil
- Spouse: Joaquim José de Magalhães Coutinho
- Occupation: Governess; chamberlain; court lady

Mariana Carlota de Verna Magalhães Coutinho, Countess of Belmonte (5 February 1779 – 17 October 1855), was a Portuguese-born Brazilian court official. She was the main chamberlain during the reign of emperor Pedro I of Brazil, and acted as a governess and second mother to the emperor's son, Pedro II, who had great affection for her and allowed her to have influence in the court. She was given the title of Countess of Belmonte.

Verna was appointed royal governess when the heir to the throne was born in 1825. When Emperor Pedro I abdicated the throne and left Brazil for Portugal in 1831, he appointed her to take care of his children, including the heir to the throne, Emperor Pedro II. After Pedro II married, she was appointed the main lady-in-waiting to empress Teresa Cristina. In 1847, she became godmother to Princess Leopoldina.
