= Princess Leopoldina of Brazil =

Brazilian princess (1847–1871)

Princess Leopoldina
- Princess Ludwig August of Saxe-Coburg and Gotha; Duchess of Saxony
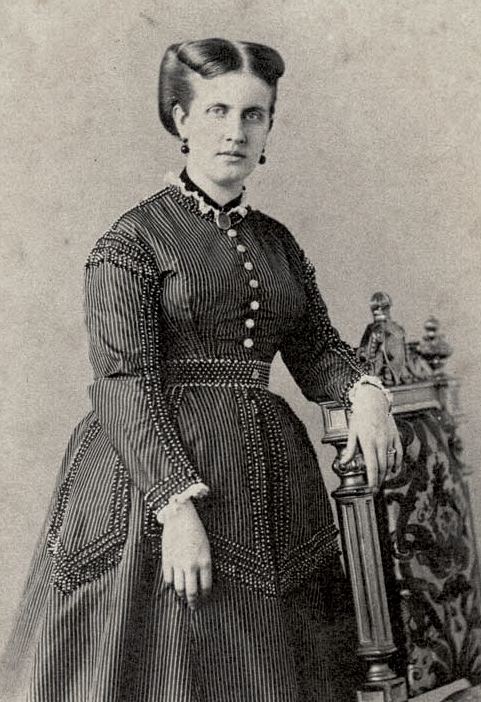
- Photograph by Joaquim Insley Pacheco, c. 1868
- Born: Princesa Leopoldina do Brasil; 13 July 1847; Paço de São Cristóvão, Rio de Janeiro, Empire of Brazil
- Died: 7 February 1871 (aged 23); Palais Coburg, Vienna, Austria-Hungary
- Burial: St. Augustine's Church, Coburg
- Spouse: Prince Ludwig August of Saxe-Coburg and Gotha (m. 1864)
- Issue Detail: Prince Peter August; Prince August Leopold; Prince Joseph Ferdinand; Prince Ludwig Gaston
Names
- Leopoldina Teresa Francisca Carolina Miguela Gabriela Rafaela Gonzaga
- House: Braganza
- Father: Pedro II of Brazil
- Mother: Teresa Cristina of the Two Sicilies
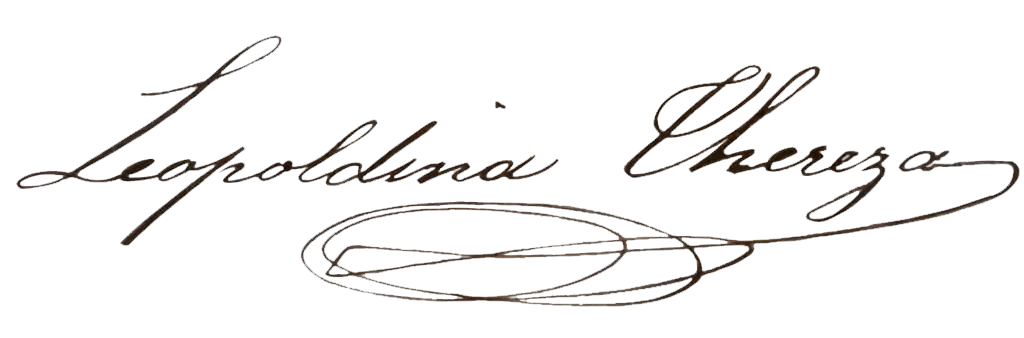
- Signature

Leopoldina, Princess Ludwig August of Saxe-Coburg and Gotha (Leopoldina Teresa Francisca Carolina Miguela Gabriela Rafaela Gonzaga; 13 July 1847 – 7 February 1871) was a Brazilian princess and a member of the Brazilian imperial family. She was the younger daughter of Emperor Pedro II and Empress Teresa Cristina. For most of her life, she was the second in the line of succession to the Brazilian throne.

Born a Princess of Brazil, upon her marriage to Prince Ludwig August of Saxe-Coburg and Gotha in 1864 she was styled Princess Ludwig August of Saxe-Coburg and Gotha and Duchess of Saxony. The couple had four sons. Following her premature death and given her sister's apparent infertility, her two eldest children were recognized and raised as Princes of Brazil. Through them, she became the matriarch of the Braganza-Saxe-Coburg and Gotha branch of the Imperial House of Brazil.

== Biography ==
=== Family and early years ===
Leopoldina was born at 6:45 am on 13 July 1847, in the Imperial Palace of São Cristóvão, the second daughter of Pedro II and Teresa Cristina of the Two Sicilies. Her paternal grandparents were the Emperor Pedro I and Empress Maria Leopoldina, and her maternal grandparents were King Francis I of the Two Sicilies and Queen Maria Isabella.

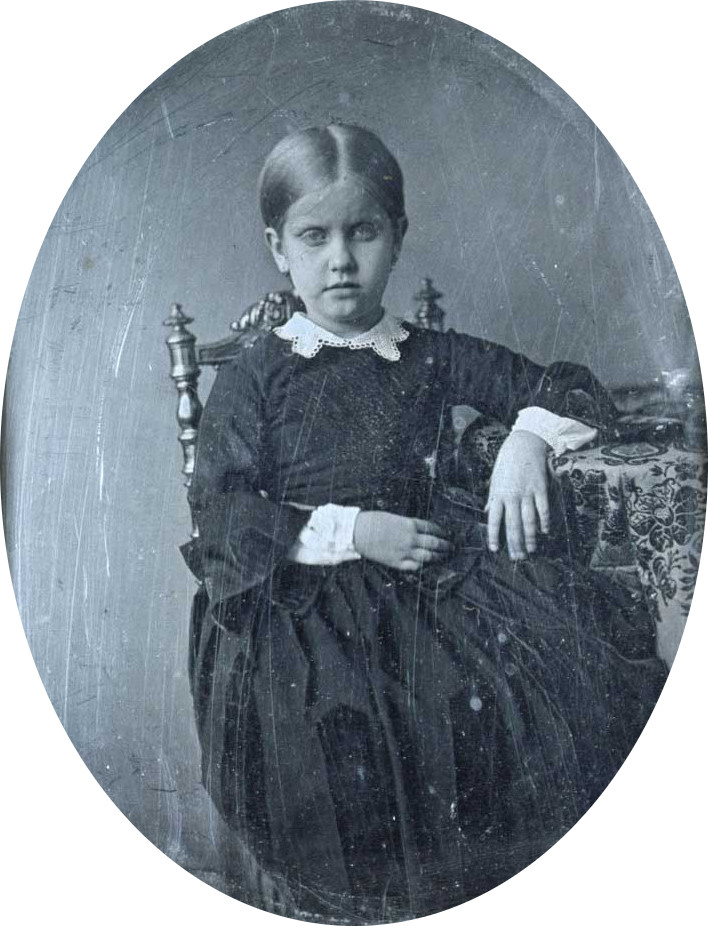
Leopoldina at age 6, c. 1853

She was baptized in the Cathedral and Imperial Chapel on 7 September 1847, by the bishop chief chaplain and diocesan gift Manuel do Monte Rodrigues de Araújo, Count of Irajá, and her name was given in honor of her paternal grandmother. Her godparents were her uncle and aunt, the Prince and Princess of Joinville—for which C. His de Buthenval, the minister plenipotentiary of Louis Philippe I of France, stood proxy—and Mariana Carlota de Verna Magalhães Coutinho, Countess of Belmonte and chief chamberlain of the Empress. From an early age, Pedro II sought to obtain a preceptor for his daughters. The choice fell on the Countess of Barral, indication of the Princess of Joinville, who began her functions in September 1855. Numerous teachers were instructed to educate the two young women, who followed an elaborate and rigorous system of studies constantly monitored by the Emperor.

The princesses attended classes six days a week, from 7 a.m. to 9:30 p.m. They could only receive visits on Sundays, at parties or on any other occasion determined by the Emperor. The subjects they studied were diverse: Portuguese and its Literature, French, English, Italian, German, Latin, Greek, Algebra, Geometry, Chemistry, Physics, Botany, History (whose subjects were divided by country and period), Cosmography, Drawing and Painting, Piano, Philosophy, Geography, Political economy, Rhetoric, Zoology, Mineralogy, and Geology.

=== Marriage ===
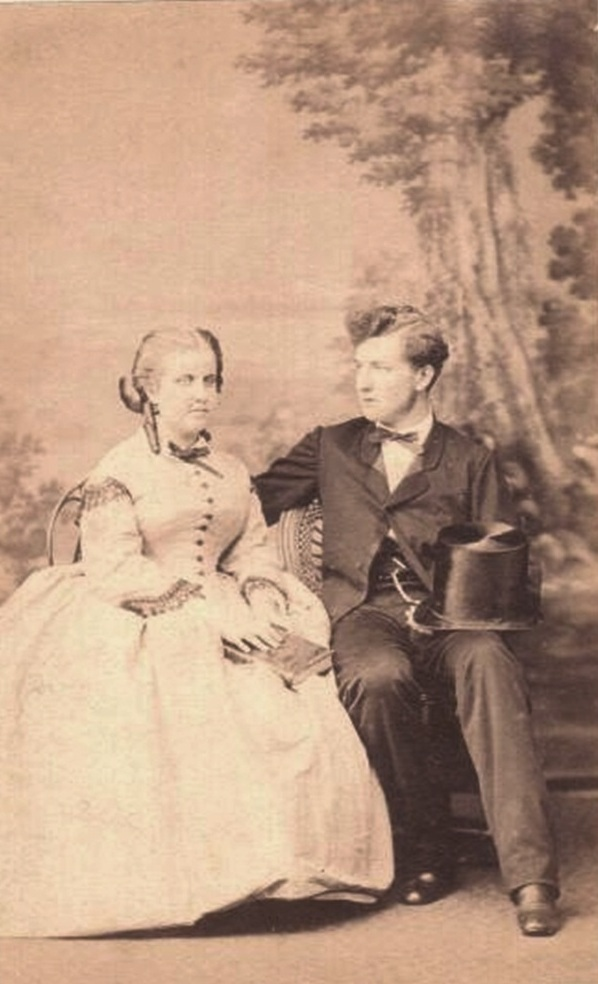
Leopoldina and Ludwig August of Saxe-Coburg and Gotha (1865)

Pedro II had commissioned Princess Francisca to find in Europe two young princes who would marry his daughters. In the Speech from the Throne of May 1864, the sovereign announced the marriage of the princesses without, however, naming names of suitors. However, the two candidates chosen by the emperor—his nephew, Pierre, Duke of Penthièvre, and Philippe, Count of Flanders (son of Leopold I of Belgium)—refused the offer, leading the monarch to opt for the Princes Ludwig August of Saxe-Coburg and Gotha, the second son of August of Saxe-Coburg-Gota and Princess Clémentine of Orléans, and Gaston of Orléans, Count of Eu.

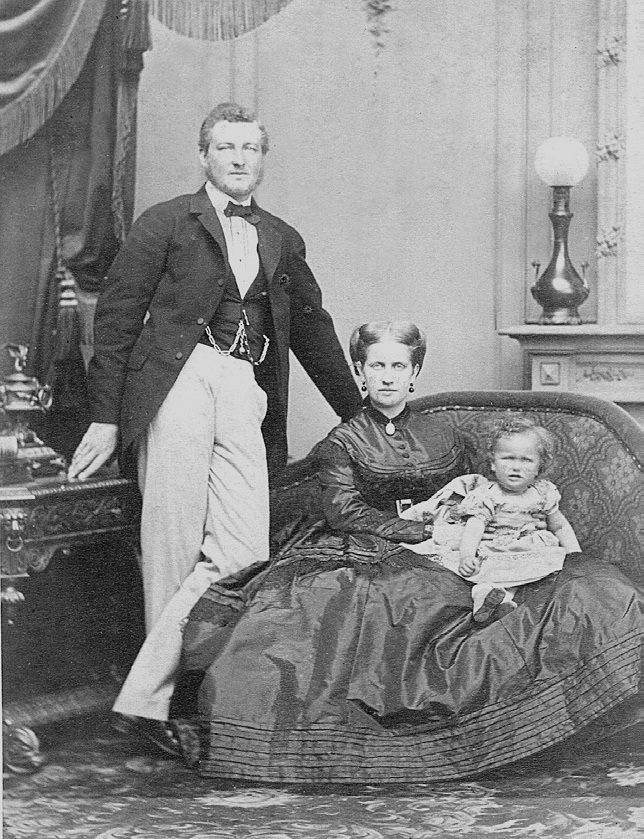
Leopoldina with her husband and their first-born, Pedro Augusto, in 1866

At first it was thought that Ludwig August was to be betrothed to the Princess Imperial and Gaston to Leopoldina, but Pedro II refused to proceed with the negotiations before hearing the opinion of his daughters about the suitors. On 2 September 1864, the princes arrived in Rio de Janeiro. In the days that followed, the initial plans were reversed, as Isabel recalled:

Papa wanted this trip, keeping an eye on our marriages. The Count of Eu was thought of for my sister and the Duke of Saxony for me. God and our hearts decided differently, and on 15 October I had the happiness of marrying the Count of Eu.

The union of Leopoldina and Ludwig August was settled through a marriage agreement between the Emperor of Brazil and the Duke of Saxe-Coburg and Gotha. The contract provided, in articles 3, 4 and 5 that, as long as Dom Pedro II did not consider Princess Isabel's succession assured, the couple should—among other things —reside part of the year in Brazil and have their children in Brazilian territory.

Finally, on 15 December 1864, Leopoldina married Ludwig August. The couple received a grant of $300,000,000 for the acquisition of a residence in Rio de Janeiro, from which they and their descendants would have the usufruct, but which would remain as national patrimony. The chosen property was a mansion next to the Palace of São Cristóvão, acquired in June 1865 and baptized as "Palace Leopoldina".

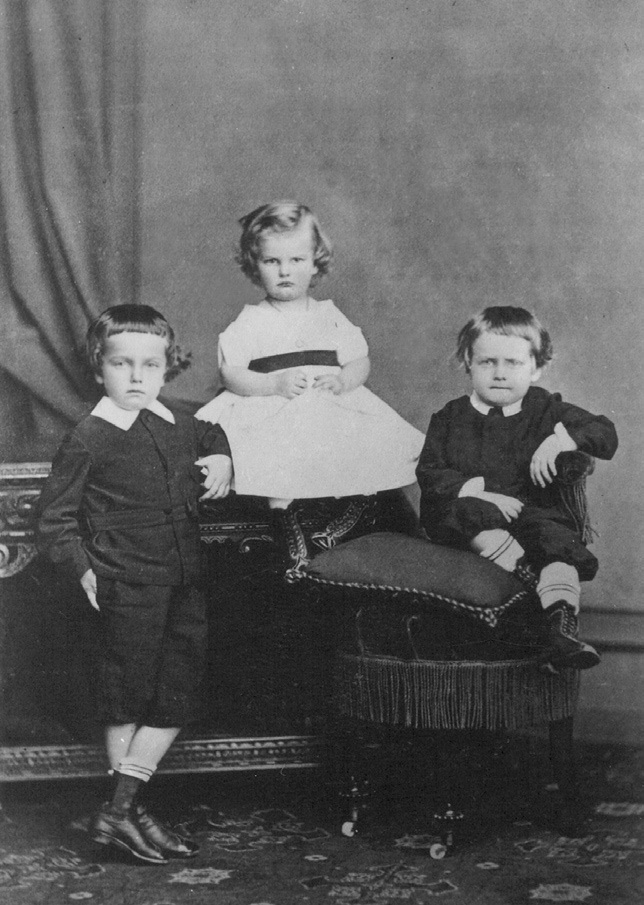
Three of the sons of Leopoldina and Ludwig August; from the left: Pedro Augusto, José and Augusto Leopoldo (1871)

Ten months after suffering a miscarriage, Leopoldina gave birth on 19 March 1866, to the one who would become Dom Pedro II's favorite grandson, Prince Pedro Augusto. From then on, the Princess began to live between Brazil and Europe, always returning to her native land for the birth of her children. Thus it was with Augusto Leopoldo and José Fernando—born in 1867 and 1869, respectively. When she discovered she was pregnant with the fourth child, she and her husband decided that they would not return to Brazil, and on 15 September 1870, Prince Luís Gastão was born at Ebenthal Castle in Austria.

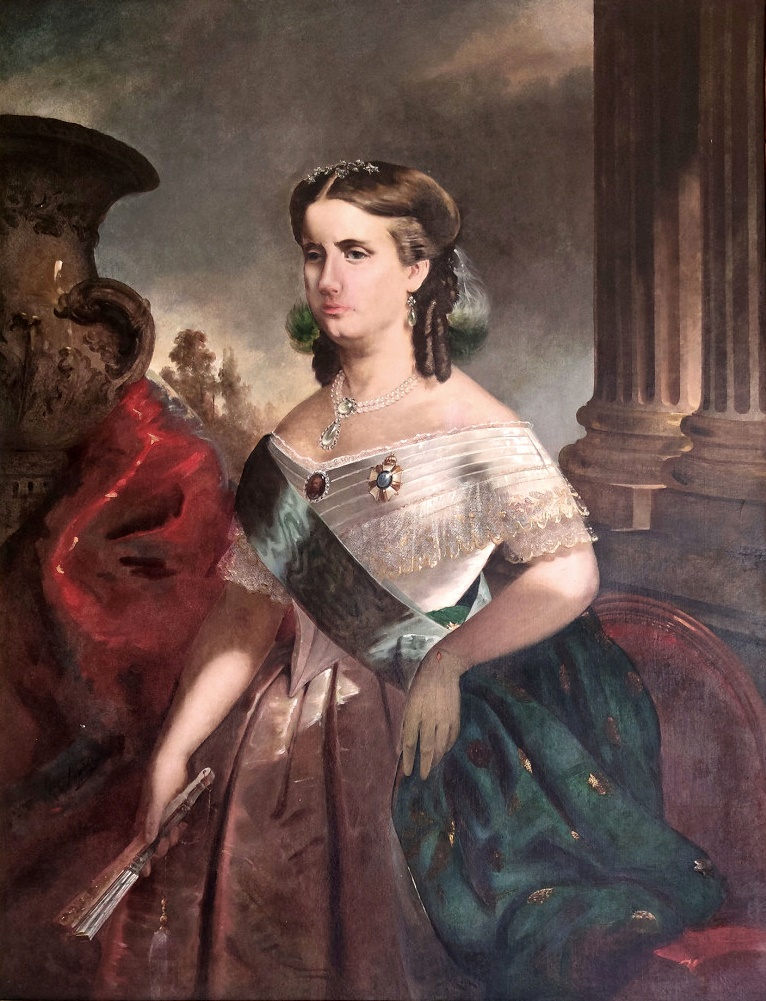
Leopoldina in traditional Brazilian court dress, 1871

=== Death ===
At the beginning of 1871, Leopoldina displayed the first symptoms of the disease that would kill her. The gastrointestinal problems and the fever, however, were not associated with the intake of contaminated water that plagued Vienna. In the second week, however, the princess was in a state of worrying prostration. The intermittent fever, the spots on the skin and the hematochezia, classic symptoms of typhoid fever, appeared in the fourth week. The picture evolved rapidly and Leopoldina began to suffer delusions and convulsions, a situation witnessed by Princess Isabel and the Count of Eu.

The princess eventually succumbed to the disease in the afternoon of 7 February 1871, at the age of 23. Clémentine of Orléans described the agony of her daughter-in-law in a letter sent to the Princess of Joinville:

May God's will be done, my good Chica, but the blow is hard and we are very unhappy. The state of my poor Gusty breaks my heart, he sobs at every moment, does not eat nor sleep, and it is a terrible change! She loved him so much. And they were so perfectly happy together! To see such happiness destroyed at age 24 is horrible!! And these poor children! I wrote you Saturday, and Sunday and Monday were calm and quiet. She did not open her eyes, but she heard what was being shouted in her ear, and she certainly recognized her sister's voice, for she spoke a few words in Portuguese. Monday night the doctors found a sensible improvement and we regained hope. The night was calm but by Tuesday morning the chest was taken and at 10 o'clock the doctors declared that there was no hope, and yet I still cared for her on this long day spent by her bed, seeing her so calm and so little changed; but by 4 p.m. the breathing became shorter. The abbot Blumel recited the prayer of the dying, we were all kneeling around her bed, and at 6 p.m. her breathing ceased, without the slightest contraction of her physiognomy. She was really beautiful then, and she had an angelic expression. Now she is lying in a coffin dressed in white silk clothes, a white crown, and her wedding veil over her head. She has not changed, it is good to look at her. She is all surrounded by fresh flowers, of crowns sent by all the princesses. Tomorrow there will be a religious ceremony at home and she will leave for Coburg, where we will all attend, including Gaston and Isabel who are very good. The latter is desperate. I embrace you, pray for us, we much need it. All yours, Clémentine.

In honor of the princess, Emperor Franz Joseph I of Austria decreed official mourning for 30 days. After the solemn funeral rites celebrated by the apostolic nuncio, Monsignor Mariano Falcinelli Antoniacci, her body was transferred to Coburg, where representatives of all the royal houses of Europe attended its burial. Her body rests in the crypt of St. Augustinkirche, next to the tombs of her husband and children. Every year, until 1922, masses in her memory were celebrated in Vienna.

== Legacy ==
The infertility of Princess Isabel, heir presumptive to the crown—who would give birth to a son only after more than ten years of marriage and almost four years after her sister's death—included Leopoldina's two eldest sons on the 2nd and 3rd positions in the line of succession to the Brazilian throne. After the death of their mother, the young princes were taken by their grandfather to be raised and educated in Brazil. This situation made the princess, although involuntarily, the founder of the cadet branch of Saxe-Coburg and Braganza. Pedro Augusto and Augusto Leopoldo would only be deprived of the succession in 1875, with the birth of Pedro de Alcântara, Prince of Grão-Pará.

== Titles, styles, and honors ==
=== Titles and styles ===
- 13 July 1847 – 15 December 1864: Her Imperial Highness Princess Leopoldina of Brazil
- 15 December 1864 – 7 February 1871: Her Imperial Highness Princess Ludwig August of Saxe-Coburg and Gotha, Duchess of Saxony

=== Honors ===
- Grand Cross of the Order of the Rose
- Grand Cross of the Imperial Order of San Carlos
- Dignitary of the Order of Queen Maria Luisa, 6 April 1863
- Dignitary of the Order of Saint Isabel
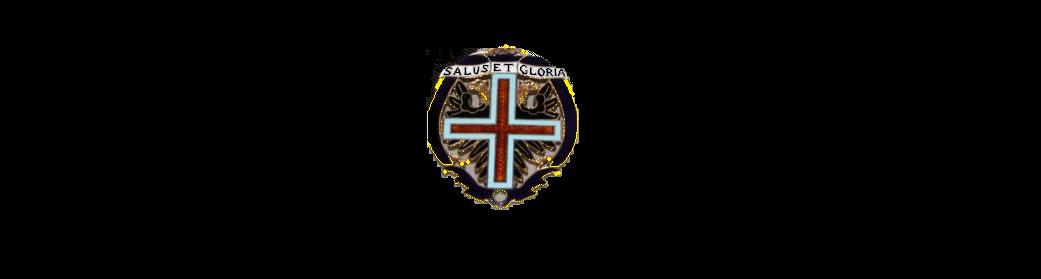
- Dignitary of the Order of the Starry Cross

== Issue ==
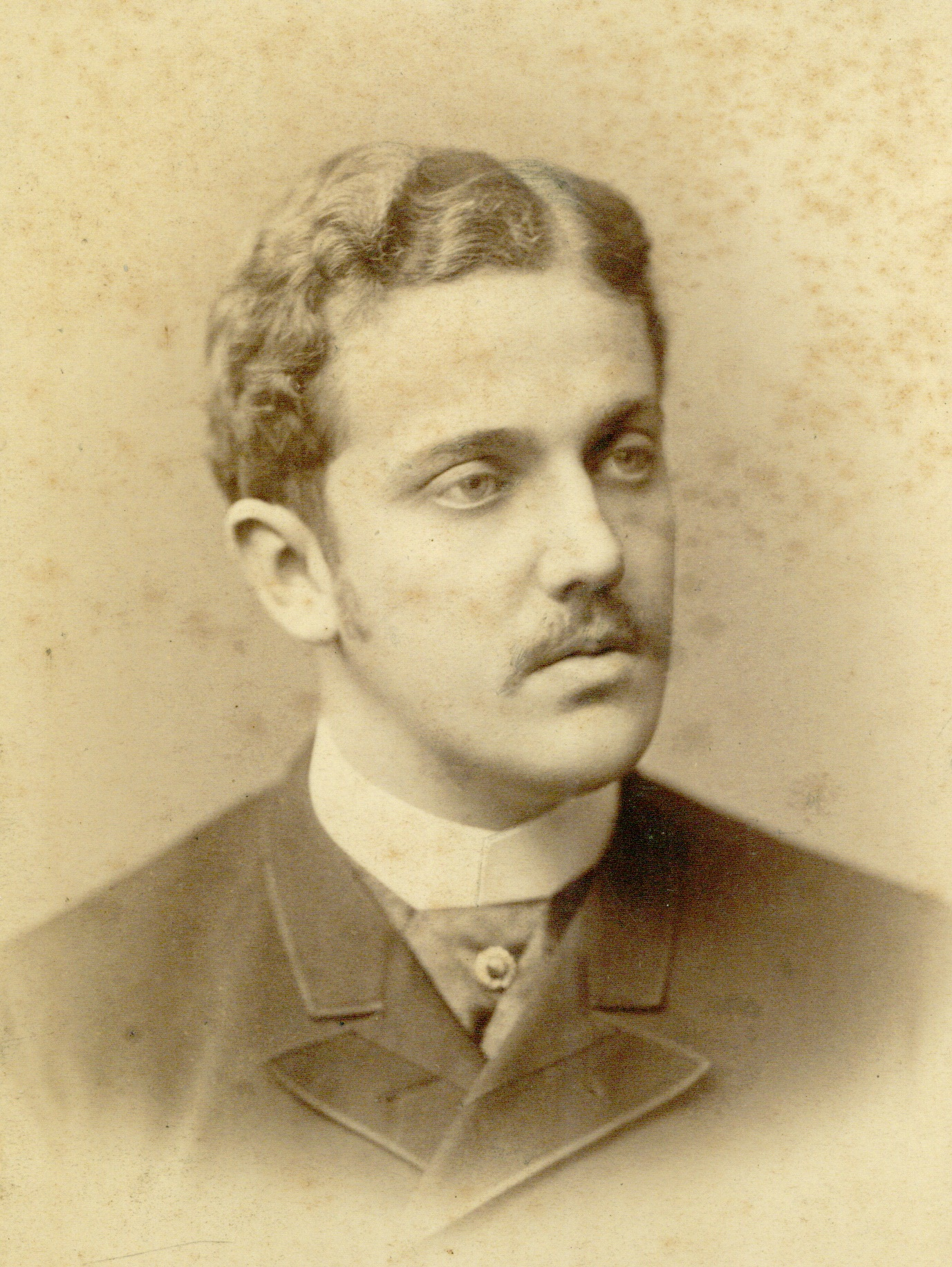
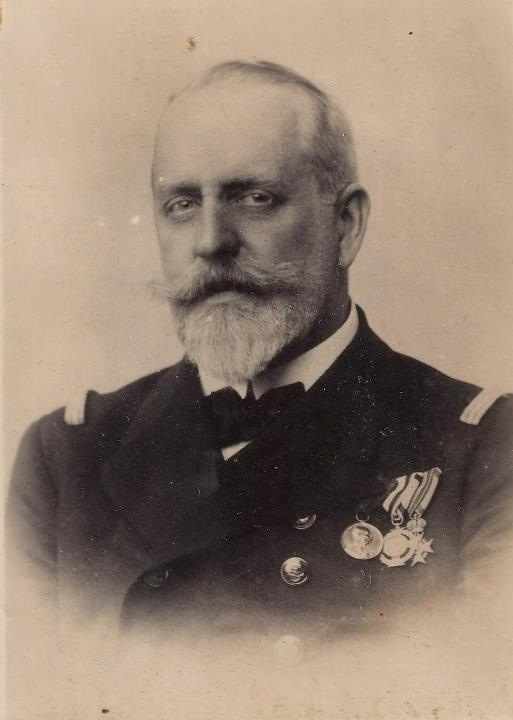
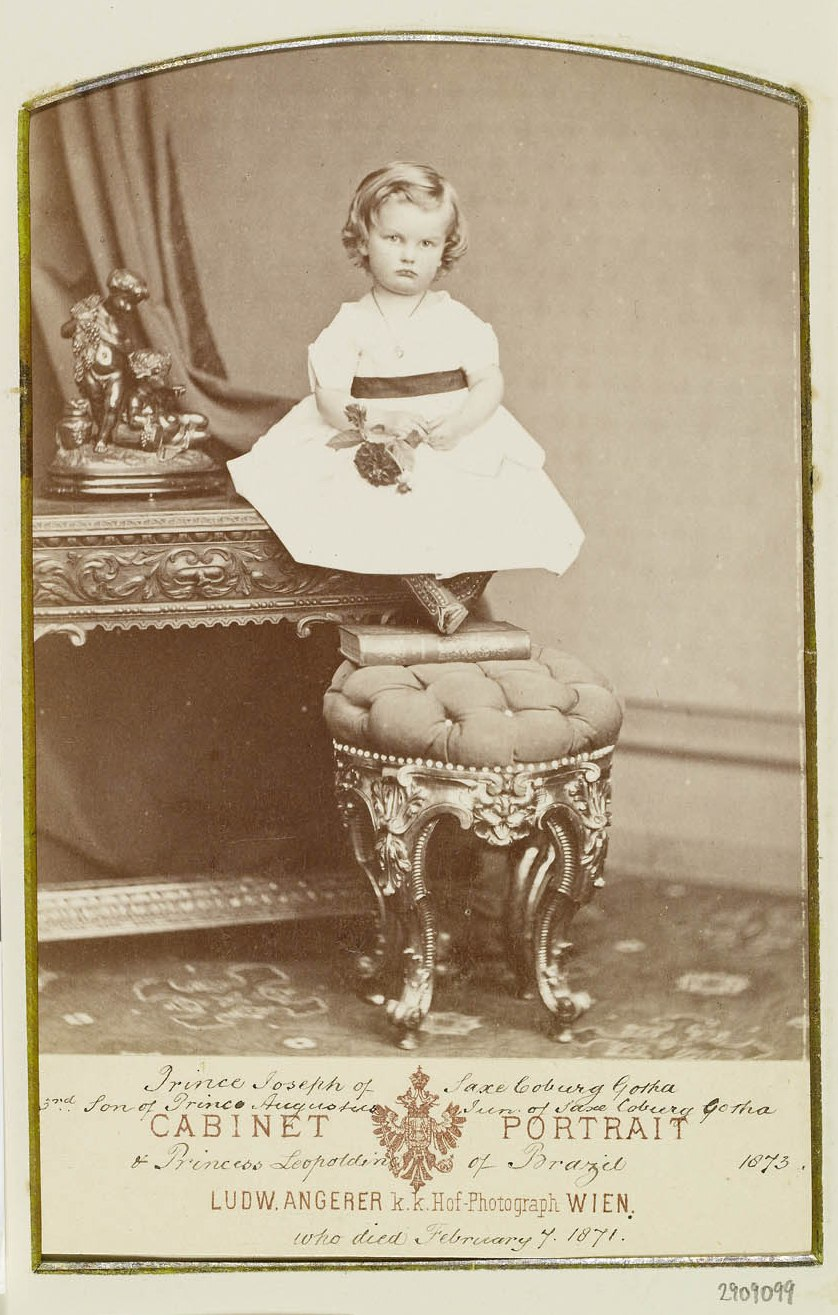
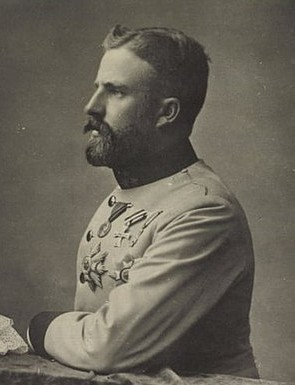
Name	Picture	Birth	Death	Notes
Peter		19 March 1866	6 July 1934	Prince of Brazil and of Saxe-Coburg and Gotha. Showed first signs of mental disorder soon after the Imperial Family's banishment following the Proclamation of the Republic on 15 November 1889. He died in an asylum on the outskirts of Vienna.
August		6 December 1867	11 October 1922	Prince of Brazil and of Saxe-Coburg and Gotha. He married (1894) Karoline Marie of Austria. They had eight children.
Joseph		21 May 1869	13 August 1888	Prince of Saxe-Coburg and Gotha. Never married.
Ludwig		15 September 1870	23 January 1942	Prince of Saxe-Coburg and Gotha. He married firstly (1900) Mathilde of Bavaria; they had two children. He married secondly (1907) Countess Anna of Trauttmansdorff-Weinsberg; they had one daughter.

== Ancestry ==
Ancestors of Princess Leopoldina of Brazil

8. João VI of Portugal and Brazil
4. Pedro I of Brazil and IV of Portugal
9. Carlota Joaquina of Spain
2. Pedro II of Brazil
10. Francis II, Holy Roman Emperor
5. Maria Leopoldina of Austria
11. Maria Theresa of Naples and Sicily
1. Princess Leopoldina of Brazil
12. Ferdinand I of the Two Sicilies
6. Francis I of the Two Sicilies
13. Maria Carolina of Austria
3. Teresa Cristina of the Two Sicilies
14. Charles IV of Spain
7. Maria Isabella of Spain
15. Maria Luisa of Parma

== Bibliography ==
- Almanak Administrativo, Mercantil e Industrial da Corte e Província do Rio de Janeiro para o Anno de 1870 – Vigésimo-sétimo anno (Segunda série XX)
- Barman, Roderick J. Princess Isabel of Brazil: Gender and Power in the Nineteenth Century, U.S., Scholarly Resources Inc., 2002 (ISBN 0842028463)
- Bragança, Dom Carlos Tasso de Saxe-Coburgo e. A Princesa Leopoldina, in Revista do Instituto Histórico e Geográfico Brasileiro, vol. 243, 1959, p. 70-93 (ISSN 0101-4366)
- Bragança, Dom Carlos Tasso de Saxe-Coburgo e. Palácio Leopoldina, in Revista do Instituto Histórico e Geográfico Brasileiro, vol. 438, 2008, p. 281-303 (ISSN 0101-4366)
- Bragança, Dom Carlos Tasso de Saxe-Coburgo e. As confidências do Visconde de Itaúna a Dom Pedro II, in Revista do Instituto Histórico e Geográfico Brasileiro, vol. 424, 2004, p. 89-161 (ISSN 0101-4366)
- Defrance, Olivier. La Médicis des Cobourg, Clémentine d’Orléans, Bruxelles, Racine, 2007 (ISBN 2873864869)
- Del Priore, Mary. O Príncipe Maldito, Rio de Janeiro, Objetiva, 2007 (ISBN 857302867X)
- Filgueiras, Carlos A.L. A química na educação da Princesa Isabel, in Revista Química Nova, vol. 27, n° 2, São Paulo, março/abril 2004 (ISSN 0100-4042)
- Lessa, Clado Ribeiro de. O Segundo Ramo da Casa Imperial e a nossa Marinha de Guerra, in Revista do Instituto Histórico e Geográfico Brasileiro, vol. 211, 1951, p. 118-133 (ISSN 0101-4366)
- Wehrs, Carlos. A Princesa Leopoldina de Bragança e Bourbon e a Casa Ducal de Saxe-Coburg, in Revista do Instituto Histórico e Geográfico Brasileiro, vol. 437, 2007, p. 275-288 (ISSN 0101-4366)
