= Prince Ludwig August of Saxe-Coburg and Gotha =

German prince

Prince Ludwig August
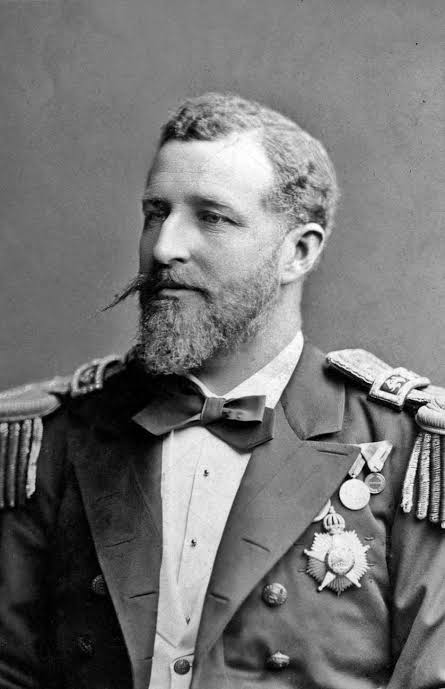
- Ludwig August in Imperial Brazilian Navy admiral uniform, c. 1880
- Born: Prinz Ludwig August von Sachsen-Coburg und Gotha; 8 August 1845; Château d'Eu, Eu, France
- Died: 14 September 1907 (aged 62); Karlsbad, Bohemia, Austria-Hungary
- Burial: St. Augustin, Coburg, Germany
- Spouse: Princess Leopoldina of Brazil (m. 1864; died 1871)
- Issue Detail: Prince Peter; Prince August Leopold; Prince Joseph; Prince Ludwig
Names
- Ludwig August Maria Eudes
- House: Saxe-Coburg and Gotha-Koháry
- Father: Prince August of Saxe-Coburg and Gotha
- Mother: Clémentine of Orléans

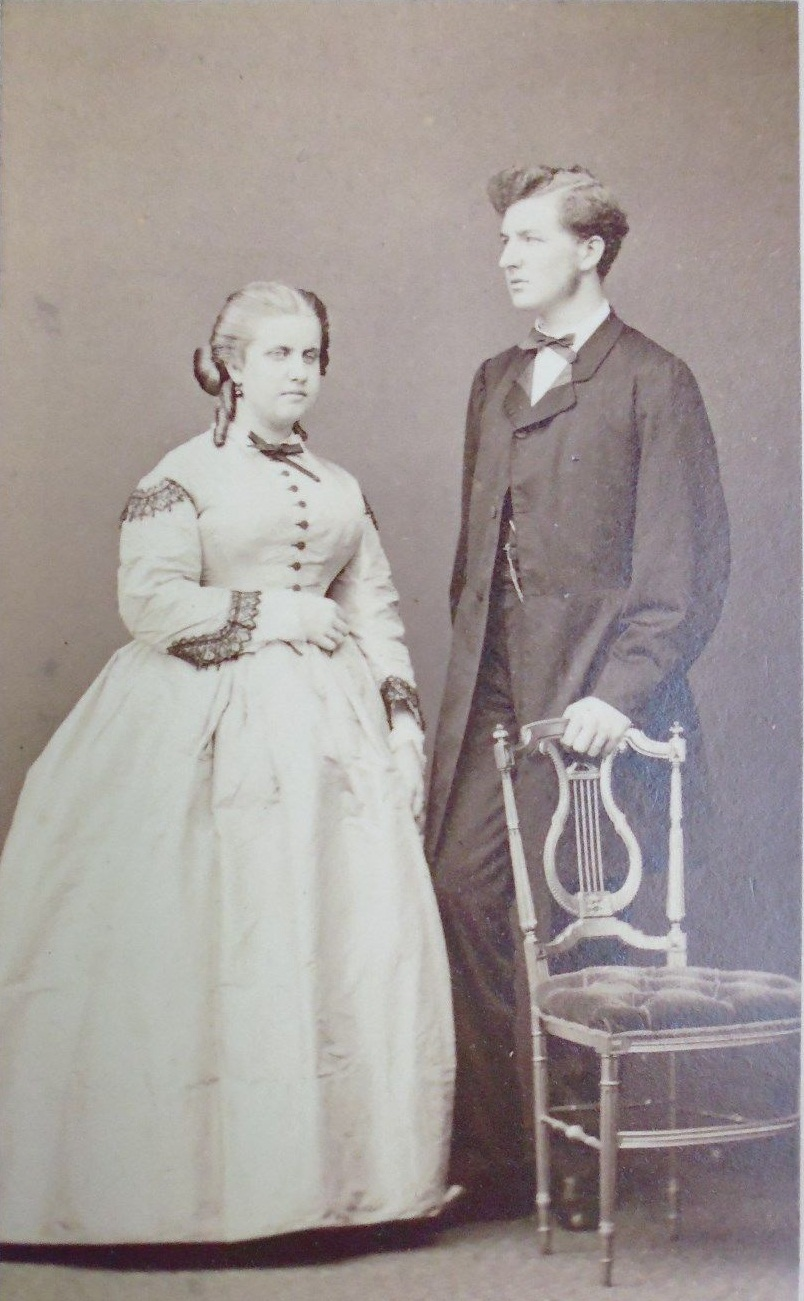
Prince Ludwig August and his wife (1864)

Prince Ludwig August of Saxe-Coburg and Gotha (Ludwig August Maria Eudes; 8 August 1845 – 14 September 1907), known in Brazil as Dom Luís Augusto, was a German prince of the House of Saxe-Coburg and Gotha-Koháry and an Admiral in the Imperial Brazilian Navy.

== Early life ==
He was born at the Château d'Eu in France, the second son of Prince August of Saxe-Coburg and Gotha and his wife, Princess Clémentine of Orléans. His father was a first cousin of Victoria of the United Kingdom and her consort, Prince Albert of Saxe-Coburg and Gotha. Through his mother he was a grandson of Louis-Philippe I, the last reigning king of France.

== Marriage and family ==
Ludwig August and his double first cousin, the French Prince Gaston, comte d'Eu (son of Victoire, sister of August's father; and prince Louis, the brother of August's mother) were imported to Brazil in order to marry the two daughters of the Emperor Pedro II of Brazil: Isabel, the elder, and Leopoldina, the younger. The original plan was for August to marry Isabel and Gaston to Leopoldina, but the girls decided otherwise and the Emperor, having himself experienced the unhappinesses of an arranged dynastic marriage, agreed to their wishes.

Ludwig August and Leopoldina married in Rio de Janeiro on 15 December 1864, two months after the wedding of Isabel and Gaston. They had four sons:

1. Peter August Ludwig Maria Michael Gabriel Raphael Gonzaga (Rio de Janeiro, 19 May 1866 – Tulln an der Donau, Austria, 6 July 1934); successor of his father in 1907. Peter died unmarried and was succeeded by his nephew Rainer.
2. August Leopold Philipp Maria Michael Gabriel Raphael Gonzaga (Rio de Janeiro, 6 December 1867 – Schladming, 11 October 1922).
3. Joseph Ferdinand Maria Michael Gabriel Raphael Gonzaga (Petrópolis, 21 May 1869 – Vienna, 13 August 1888).
4. Ludwig Gaston Klemens Maria Michael Gabriel Raphael Gonzaga (Ebenthal, 15 September 1870 – Innsbruck, 23 January 1942); married Princess Mathilde of Bavaria (1877–1906). After the death of his first wife, he married Countess Anna von und zu Trauttmansdorff-Weinsberg (1873–1948).

== Death ==
Prince Ludwig August died on 14 September 1907 in Karlsbad, Bohemia, aged 62. His body was buried in St. Augustine's Church, Coburg

His wife, Princess Leopoldine of Brazil, died young, on 7 February 1871 in Vienna, at the age of 23. Her body remains are buried next to her husband in Coburg, Germany.

== Honours ==
- Empire of Brazil:
  - Grand Cross of the Order of the Southern Cross
  - Grand Cross of the Order of Pedro I
  - Grand Cross of the Order of the Rose
  - Grand Cross of the Imperial Order of Our Lord Jesus Christ
  - Grand Cross of the Imperial Order of Saint Benedict of Aviz
  - Grand Cross of the Imperial Order of St. James of the Sword
  - Uruguay Campaign Medal
- (Saxe-Coburg and Gotha) (Duchy of Saxe-Altenburg) (Saxe-Meiningen) Ernestine duchies: Grand Cross of the Order of Ernest the Pious, June 1863
- Russian Empire: Knight of the Order of St. Andrew the Apostle the First-called, 1865
