= Princess Clémentine of Orléans =

French princess; third daughter of Louis-Philippe I (1817-1907)

Princess Clémentine
- Princess August of Saxe-Coburg and Gotha
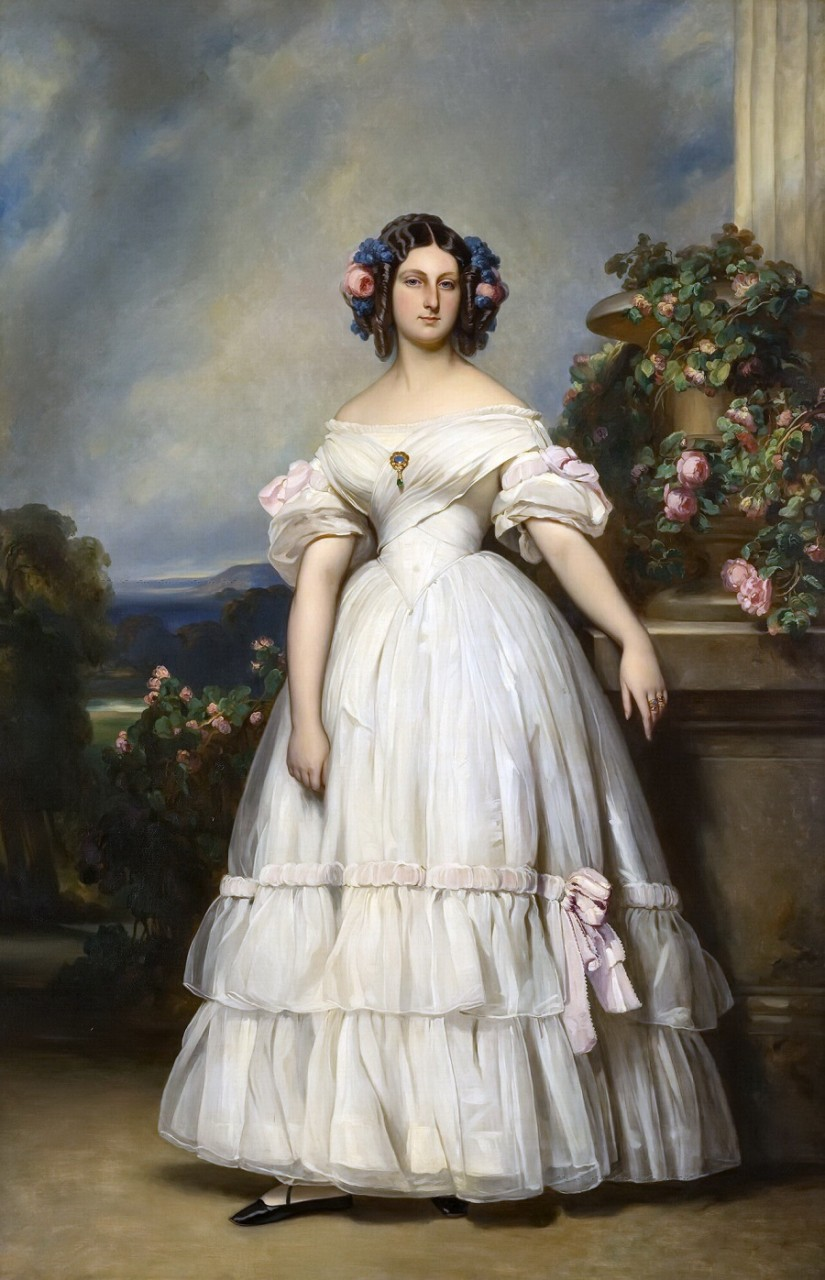
- Portrait of Clementine by Franz Xaver Winterhalter, 1846
- Born: 3 June 1817; Château de Neuilly, Kingdom of France
- Died: 16 February 1907 (aged 89); Vienna, Austria-Hungary
- Burial: St. Augustin, Coburg
- Spouse: Prince August of Saxe-Coburg and Gotha (m. 1843; died 1881)
- Issue: Prince Philipp of Saxe-Coburg and Gotha; Prince Ludwig August; Clotilde, Archduchess of Austria; Amalie, Duchess in Bavaria; Ferdinand I of Bulgaria
Names
- Marie Clémentine Léopoldine Caroline Clotilde d'Orléans
- House: Orléans (by birth); Saxe-Coburg-Gotha (by marriage)
- Father: Louis Philippe I
- Mother: Princess Maria Amalia of the Two Sicilies

Princess Clémentine of Orléans (French: Marie Clémentine Léopoldine Caroline Clotilde d'Orléans; 3 June 1817 – 16 February 1907) was the sixth child and youngest daughter of Louis-Philippe I, King of the French and Maria Amalia of the Two Sicilies. She was the mother of Ferdinand I, Tsar of Bulgaria.

== Early life ==
Marie Clémentine Léopoldine Caroline Clotilde of Orléans, styled Mademoiselle de Beaujolais, was born on 3 June 1817 at the Château de Neuilly, in Neuilly-sur-Seine, France, soon after the Bourbon Restoration. She became a royal princess, Princess of Orléans, following her father's ascension to the French throne in 1830.

As a young woman, it was written that she "is represented to possess great beauty and accomplishments." Clémentine was taught history by the radical historian Jules Michelet, who would spend lessons glorifying the French Revolution to his young student.

== Marriage ==
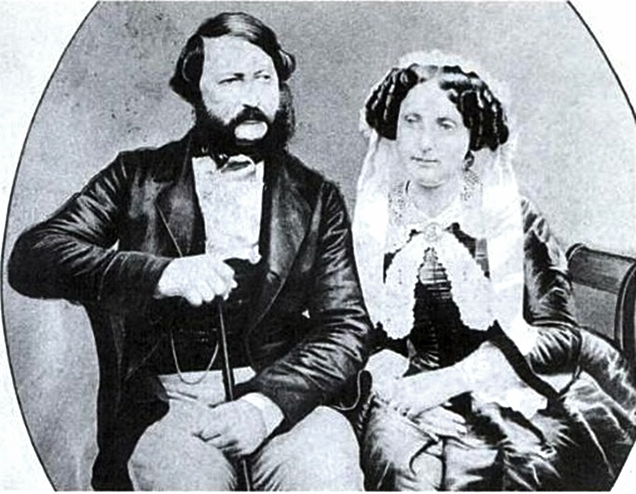
Prince August of Saxe-Coburg and Gotha with Princess Clémentine

As a princess, Clémentine was sought after as a bride by royal families throughout Europe. In 1836, it was rumoured that Clémentine would marry her cousin, Ferdinand II of the Two Sicilies, when the period of his widowhood expired.

King Leopold I of Belgium organised the marriage of Clémentine and Prince August of Saxe-Coburg and Gotha, who was closely connected to the royal houses of the United Kingdom, Portugal, Spain, Belgium, Brazil, Mexico and Austria-Hungary. August's cousin Albert married August's other cousin Queen Victoria and was Prince Consort in the United Kingdom.

The contract of marriage between Clémentine and August was signed in Vienna on 24 February 1843 by the French Ambassador Charles Joseph, Comte de Flahaut, representing Clémentine and the Belgian Ambassador Baron O'Sullivan, representing August.

Prior to the wedding, the couple sought to reside in Austria, and an application was made to Prince Metternich, to know on what footing the husband of Princess Clémentine would be received at the Court of Vienna. The answer was that Princess Clémentine would be received as Princess of the Royal Family of the Bourbons but the Austrian Court would not recognise August as a Royal Highness. In consequence, it was decided that Prince Augustus would reside in France, and that he would quit the Austrian service and enter that of France, although he was an Austrian subject.

On 20 April 1843, Princess Clémentine married Prince August at the Château de Saint-Cloud, with much "of European royalty in attendance." The couple had five children. Queen Victoria wrote to her uncle Leopold (who was married to Clémentine's sister): "I cannot say much for poor Gusti. Though I love him, but he is really too odd and inanimate. Clem seems very happy and writes that she is happiest when tête a tête with Gusti, which I should not fancy."

== Children ==
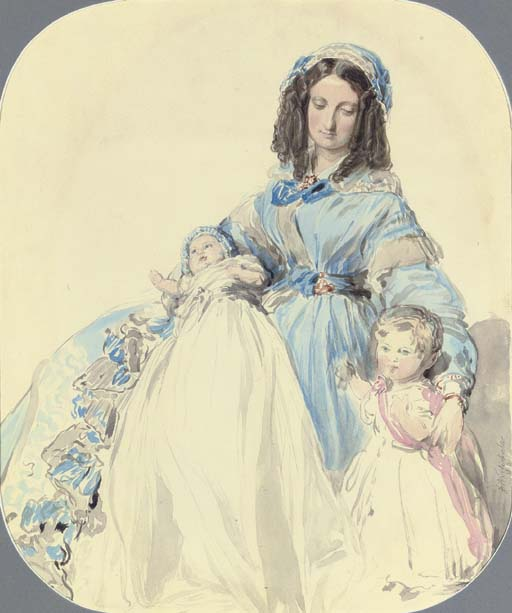
Princess Clémentine, with her two eldest sons, Philip and Augustus, 1845

Described as "a woman of formidable character and ambition... Clémentine dominated her husband and spoilt her children. Having herself married no more than a wealthy but undistinguished prince, she sought thrones for her sons." In her political ambition, and high expectation of her children, she resembled her grandmother Maria Carolina, and her great-grandmother Maria Theresa.

Name	Birth	Death	Notes
Philipp of Saxe-Coburg and Gotha	28 March 1844	3 July 1921	married his cousin, Princess Louise of Belgium, eldest daughter of King Leopold II of Belgium, on 4 February 1875; had issue
Ludwig August of Saxe-Coburg and Gotha	8 August 1845	14 September 1907	married Princess Leopoldina of Brazil, younger daughter of Emperor Pedro II of Brazil, on 15 December 1864; had issue
Clotilde of Saxe-Coburg and Gotha	8 July 1846	3 June 1927	married Archduke Joseph Karl of Austria, Palatine of Hungary, and became the foremother of the so-called Hungarian branch of the Habsburg dynasty, on 12 May 1864; had issue
Amalie of Saxe-Coburg and Gotha	23 October 1848	6 May 1894	married Duke Maximilian Emanuel in Bavaria, the youngest brother of Empress Elisabeth of Austria, on 20 September 1875; had issue
Ferdinand, Tsar of Bulgaria	26 February 1861	10 September 1948	married Princess Maria Luisa of Parma, eldest daughter of Robert I of Parma, on 20 April 1893; had issue

== 1848 and aftermath ==
The Revolutions of 1848 in France led to the end of her father's reign, forcing Clémentine and her family to flee France, although Clémentine and Auguste, after ensuring their children were safely away, mingled with the crowd on the Place de la Concorde during the abdication before leisurely travelling to Versailles by train. She then accompanied her father to the French Embassy in London before heading to Coburg, and then onto Vienna, where her husband was an officer with the Austro-Hungarian army.

Clémentine campaigned to regain the assets taken by decree from the Orléans by Louis Napoleon, seeking the return of the ancestral inheritance by, amongst other things, a letter writing campaign to the French media. She publicly refused the offer from Emperor Napoleon III of 200,000 francs, demanding instead the heritage of her father.

While staying with Queen Victoria in July 1851, Clémentine had to cut short her visit to return to Spain when news arrived that her sons' tutor "had gone off his head". Victoria fretted that she would share Clémentine's fate and revolution would end the British monarchy, and feared what would happen to her children.

August died in 1881. Clémentine did not remarry, living almost to the age of 90.

== Clémentine and the election to the Bulgarian throne ==
Realising that she would never be queen, Clémentine turned her efforts to instilling in Ferdinand, her favorite child, the idea that, as a descendant not only of Louis-Philippe but of the Sun King, he deserved to be a king, of which country was not an important matter.

Clémentine ensured that Ferdinand was widely educated; fluent in several languages, Ferdinand also gained a great interest in the natural sciences and nature, all of which, Clémentine believed, would make Ferdinand an excellent king.

As it turned out, that country was Bulgaria and Clémentine actively lobbied for Ferdinand's election as Prince of Bulgaria.

Clémentine then worked to ensure European recognition of Ferdinand, lobbying other heads of state, including Kaiser Wilhelm II and Ferdinand's suzerain, Sultan Abdul Hamid II of the Ottoman Empire. She was said to "cast a beneficent and civilizing glow around [Ferdinand], smoothing away many difficulties by her womanly tact and philanthropic activity."

Clémentine also found time to design a royal crown for Ferdinand, which included a "requisite number of jewels from her own dressing case". Unfortunately, Ferdinand made a number of alterations to the design but decided not to pay the painter for painting a portrait of the new crown, leading him to be sued by the painter in a Munich court.

== Clémentine in Bulgaria ==
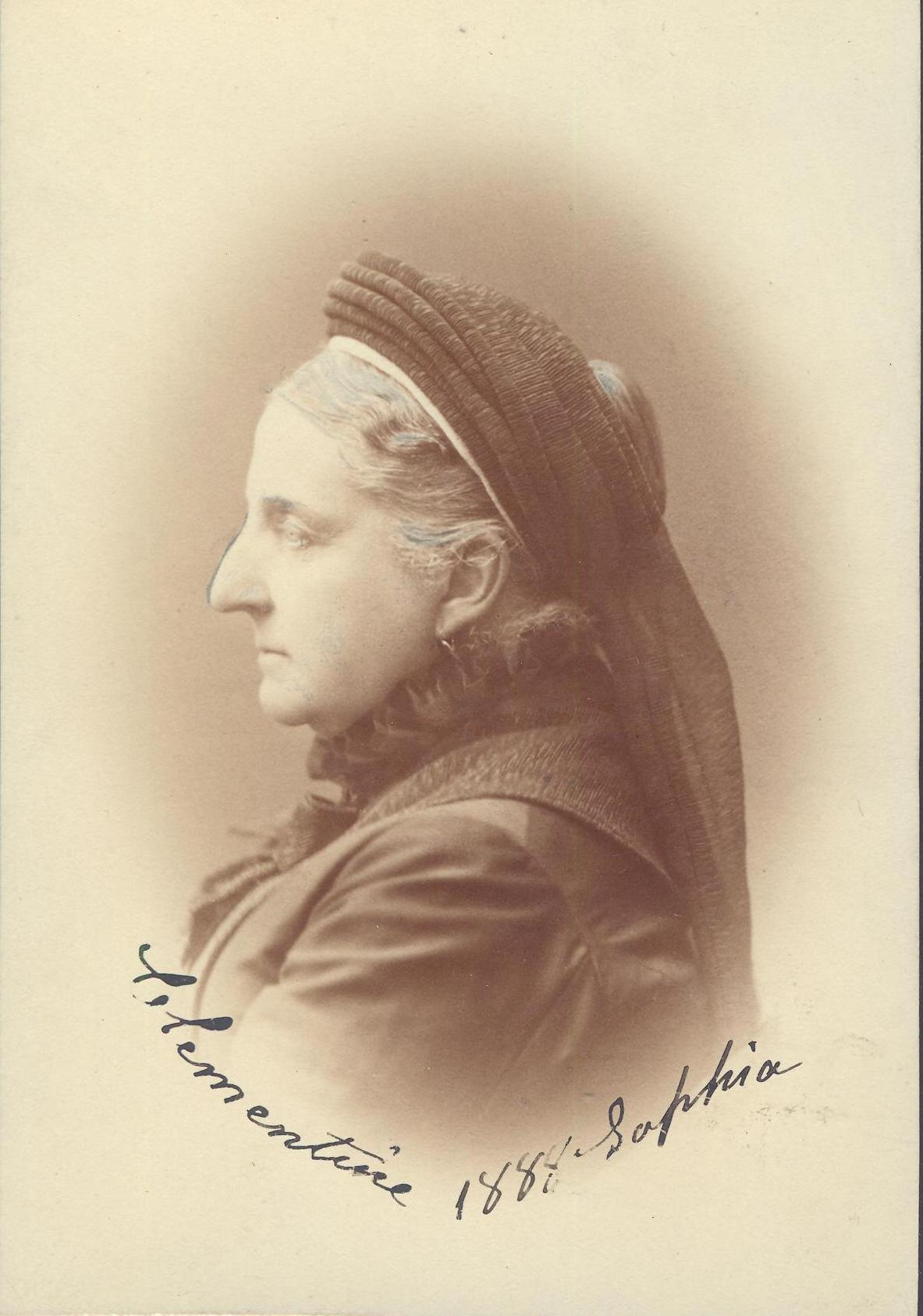
Princess Clémentine of Orléans

Clémentine followed her son to Bulgaria, where she became an important person as the mother of the sovereign. Extremely wealthy, Clémentine made herself popular in her adopted homeland by showering money on Bulgaria, including a donation of four million francs towards the completion of a railway line linking Bulgaria to Europe's rail network. She is considered to have had a positive impact on Bulgarian society, and created good will for Ferdinand among the Bulgarian public by large donation to charitable and public causes: she financed the construction of several buildings and institutions, such as a school for the Blind and the Klimentinskata Hospital, and she was also one of the founders of the Bulgarian Red Cross.

Clémentine also gained a reputation for haughtiness and disdain for anyone not of royal blood, although she surprised many observers with her charm and good humour at times. At official dinners, it is said she "smiled at the small incongruities committed during these meals by the uncouth Bulgarian notabilities of those days, and she contrived somehow by her tact, and without ever wounding any one among them, to teach them that peas are not to be eaten with one's knife, and that it is not altogether the thing to drink from the finger-bowl."

A friend of Queen Victoria, Clémentine would lunch with Victoria, particularly at Coburg when Victoria would visit her German relatives.

Said to be "one of the cleverest royal ladies in Europe", Clémentine was known for her "shrewd mind and a remarkable understanding of European politics and diplomacy", and was often sent by Ferdinand as his representative on diplomatic missions around Europe.

Clémentine also sought a suitable bride for Ferdinand and was said to be "anxious" to arrange a marriage between Ferdinand and Princess Hélène of Orléans, the Comte de Paris's daughter, but Princess Hélène demurred.

In February 1896, Clémentine was reported to have "broken off relations" with Ferdinand following Ferdinand's consent to have his son Boris baptised into the Bulgarian Orthodox Church. They reconciled, however, and one of the highlights of her life was seeing Prince Ferdinand hailed as a recognized head of state during an official visit to Paris later that year. This was particularly poignant, as it recalled her father's forced abdication and flight from Paris in 1848.

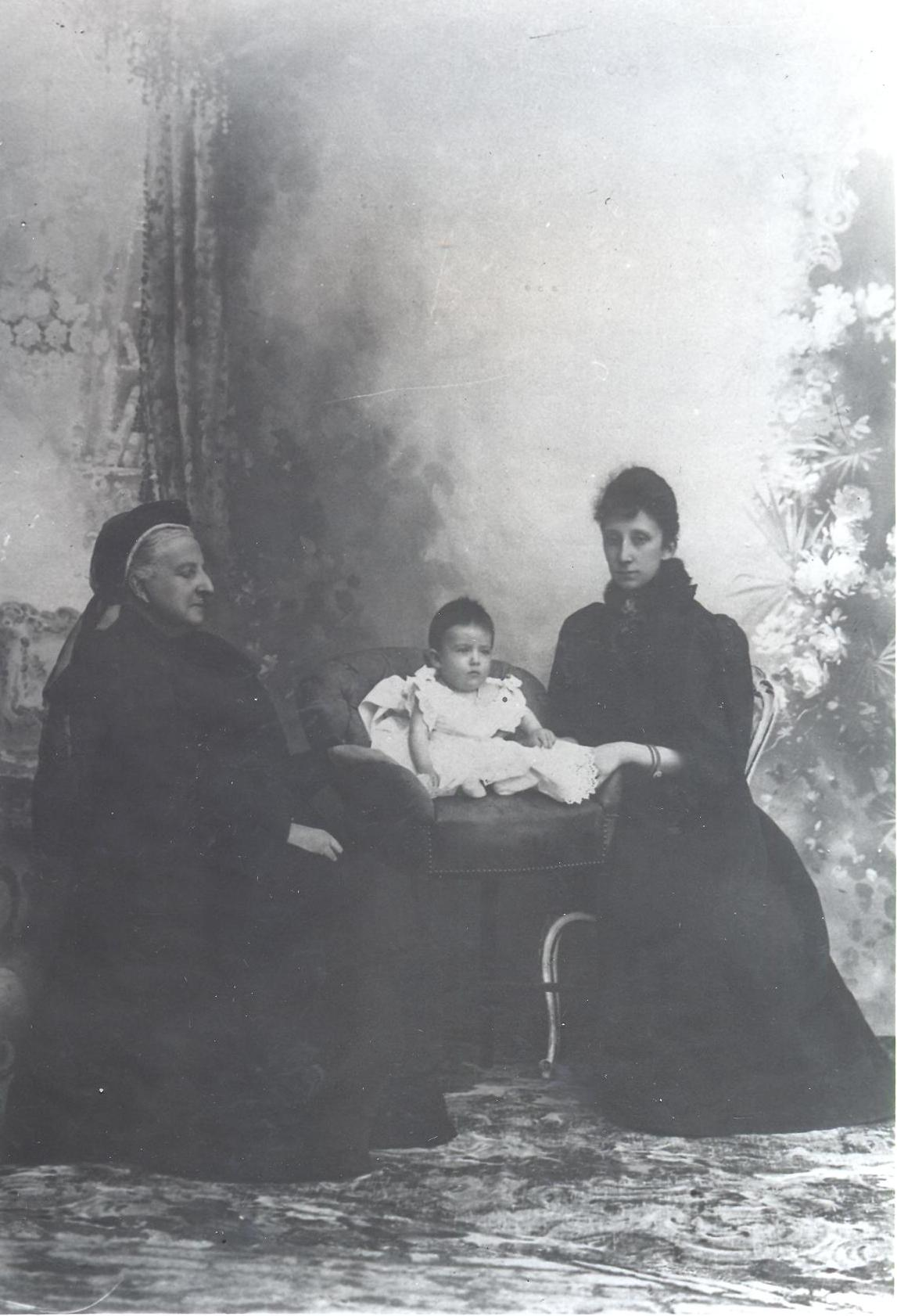
Princess Clémentine with her daughter-in-law Marie Louise and her son, the future Tsar Boris III of Bulgaria

In 1899, her daughter-in-law Marie Louise of Bourbon-Parma died following complications from the birth of daughter Nadezhda (who was given the middle name Clémentine in honour of her grandmother) and Clémentine assumed responsibility for the education of the children.

Following the Ilinden–Preobrazhenie Uprising of 1903 and the resultant increase in refugees, Clémentine co-ordinated the humanitarian response, gathering donations throughout Europe, including 2000 Francs from Kaiser Wilhelm II.

In October 1903, Clémentine, along with Prince Boris, was on the Orient Express when it collided with a goods train near the Serbian border. Although shaken, they were not hurt.

Increasingly deaf as she aged, Clémentine became dependent on an enormous ear trumpet and on people obligingly raising their voices for her. It became an occupational hazard of the Bulgarian court to be caught in long, loud conversations with Clémentine that she was reluctant to end. However, even well into her eighties, Clémentine often traveled to Paris to study the latest fashions.

Styles of Princess Clémentine of Saxe-Coburg and Gotha
- Reference style: Her Royal Highness
- Spoken style: Your Royal Highness

== Death and legacy ==
Although she saw Ferdinand recognized internationally as Prince of Bulgaria (albeit under the nominal suzerainty of the Ottoman Sultan), Clémentine died the year before the dream of seeing her son installed as an independent monarch was realized.

Clémentine suffered from inflammation of the right lung in February 1898 and, while there were fears for her health, she was able to recover satisfactorily.

In early February 1907, Clémentine was struck with a bout of influenza, which, considering her age, was feared to be terminal. Clémentine was reported to have recovered from this bout "so that all danger has passed" but remained weak.

Clémentine died in Vienna on 16 February 1907, at the age of eighty-nine. Her influence on Ferdinand was so pronounced that people began to predict his downfall. She was buried in Coburg, with an inscription on her memorial, composed by Ferdinand after his installation as tsar in 1908, reading "King's daughter, no Queen herself, yet King's mother.". She was the last surviving child of Louis-Philippe.

In 1911, she was described in the memoirs of Archduchess Louise of Austria, granddaughter of her cousin Leopold II:

The Princess was short and fat, but withal not inelegant, and very much grande dame. She had piercing blue eyes, a prominent nose, and the brains and judgment of an exceptionally clever man. Unfortunately, Aunt Clémentine was extremely deaf and used a large ear-trumpet which we irreverently called "The Coffee Mill"; indeed, in our family she was known as "Aunt Coffee-Mill," and as she possessed an exceptionally mauvaise langue, my brothers declared that she groined the reputations of others to powder in her coffee Mill.

== Ancestry ==
Ancestors of Princess Clémentine of Orléans

8. Louis Philippe I, Duke of Orléans
4. Louis Philippe II, Duke of Orléans
9. Louise Henriette de Bourbon
2. Louis Philippe I of France
10. Louis Jean Marie, Duke of Penthièvre
5. Louise Marie Adélaïde de Bourbon
11. Maria Teresa Felicitas d'Este
1. Princess Clémentine of Orléans
12. Charles III of Spain
6. Ferdinand I of the Two Sicilies
13. Maria Amalia of Saxony
3. Maria Amalia of Naples and Sicily
14. Francis I, Holy Roman Emperor
7. Maria Carolina of Austria
15. Maria Theresa of Austria

== Sources ==
- Aronson, T. (1986) Crowns in conflict: the triumph and the tragedy of European monarchy, 1910–1918, J. Murray, London. ISBN 0-7195-4279-0.
- Barman, R. (2002) Citizen Emperor: Pedro II and the Making of Brazil, 1825–1891, Stanford University Press. ISBN 0-8047-4400-9.
- Constant, S. (1979) Foxy Ferdinand, 1861–1948, Tsar of Bulgaria, Sidgwick and Jackson, London. ISBN 0-283-98515-1.
- de Saint-Amand, I. (1895) The Revolution of 1848, Charles Scribner's Sons, New York.
- Ilchev, I., Kolev, V. & Yanchev, V. (2005) Bulgarian parliament and Bulgarian statehood, St. Kliment Ohridski University Press, ISBN 954-07-2197-0.
- Jobson, D. (1848) Career of Louis-Philippe: with a full account of the late revolution, E. Churton.
- Longford, E. (1987) Victoria R.I., George Weidenfeld & Nicolson Ltd, London. ISBN 0-297-17001-5.
- Mansel, P. (2001) Paris Between Empires, Phoenix, London. ISBN 1-84212-656-3.
- Princess Catherine Radziwill (1916, reprinted 2010) Sovereigns and Statesmen of Europe, Get Books, ISBN 1-4455-6810-1.
