= Prince August of Saxe-Coburg and Gotha =

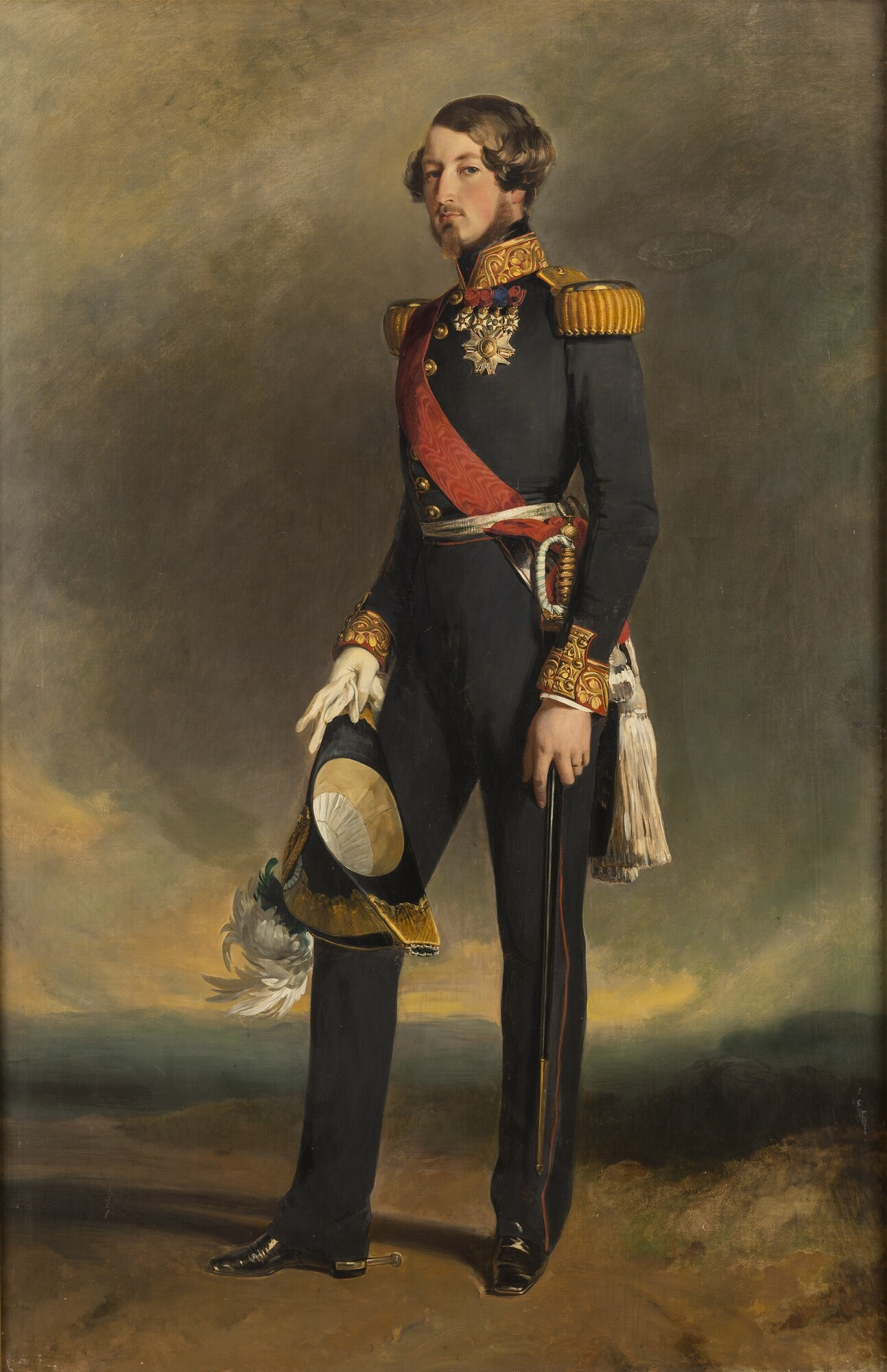
- Portrait, c. 1845

Head of the House of Saxe-Coburg and Gotha-Koháry
- Tenure: 27 August 1851 – 26 July 1881
- Predecessor: Prince Ferdinand
- Successor: Prince Philipp
- Born: Prinz August von Sachsen-Coburg-Saalfeld; 13 June 1818; Vienna, Austrian Empire
- Died: 26 July 1881 (aged 63); Ebenthal Castle, Ebenthal
- Burial: St. Augustin Cathedral, Coburg
- Spouse: Princess Clémentine of Orléans (m. 1843)
- Issue: Prince Philipp; Prince Ludwig August; Archduchess Clotilde of Austria; Amalie, Duchess in Bavaria; Ferdinand I of Bulgaria
Names
- August Ludwig Viktor
- House: Saxe-Coburg and Gotha-Koháry
- Father: Prince Ferdinand of Saxe-Coburg and Gotha
- Mother: Princess Mária Antónia Koháry de Csábrág et Szitnya

August Victor Louis of Saxe-Coburg and Gotha (German: August Viktor Ludwig; 13 June 1818 – 26 July 1881), was a German prince of the Catholic House of Saxe-Coburg and Gotha-Koháry. He was a General Major in the Royal Saxon Army and the owner of Čábráď and Štiavnica, both in modern-day Slovakia.

== Life ==
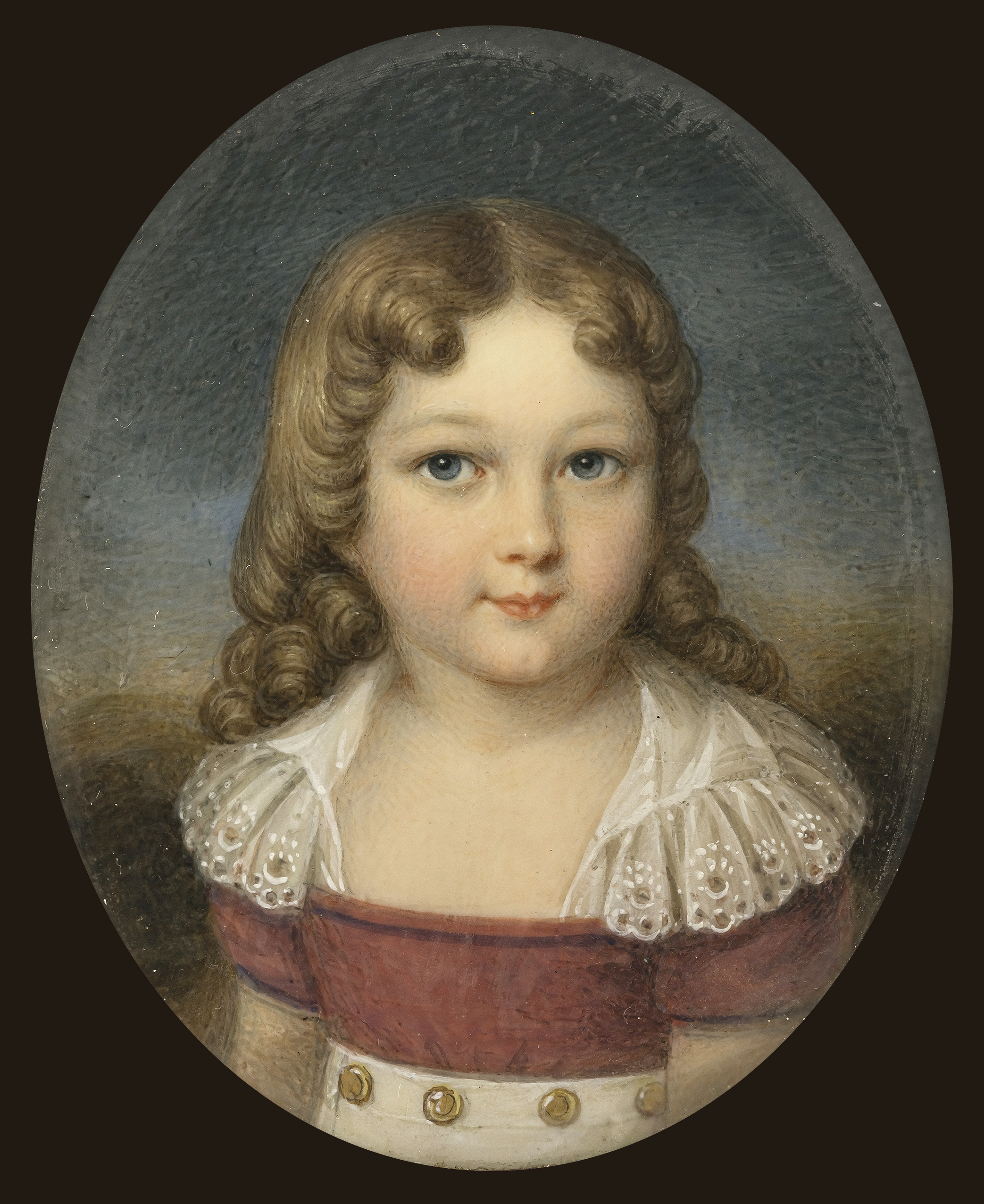
Portrait of Prince August as a child, 1820s

Born Prince August Viktor Ludwig of Saxe-Coburg-Saalfeld, he was the second son of Prince Ferdinand of Saxe-Coburg-Saalfeld. He was born in Vienna on 13 June 1818 and baptised at St. Stephan Cathedral on the 16th of that month. His godparents were his paternal grandmother, Countess Augusta Reuss of Ebersdorf, his aunts, Victoria, Duchess of Kent and Louise, Duchess of Saxe Coburg. Following the 1826 re-distribution in the House of Wettin of the Ernestine duchies, his dynastic suffix became "of Saxe-Coburg and Gotha". His mother was Princess Mária Antónia Koháry de Csábrág et Szitnya, the daughter and heiress of Ferenc József, Prince Koháry de Csábrág et Szitnya. When Antonia's father died in 1826, she inherited his estates in Slovakia and Hungary. Prince August was a younger brother of King-Consort Ferdinand II of Portugal, a nephew of Leopold I of Belgium, and a first cousin of Britain's Queen Victoria, and her husband, Prince Albert.

In Saint-Cloud on 20 April 1843 August married Princess Clémentine of Orléans, daughter of Louis Philippe, King of the French, and of his wife, Princess Maria Amalia of the Two Sicilies. The couple lived in Palais Coburg in Vienna. He also owned Bürglaß Castle in Coburg. When his mother died in 1862, he inherited her extensive landholdings in Hungary and became one of the largest landowners in the country. He was an honorary member of the Hungarian Geological Society.

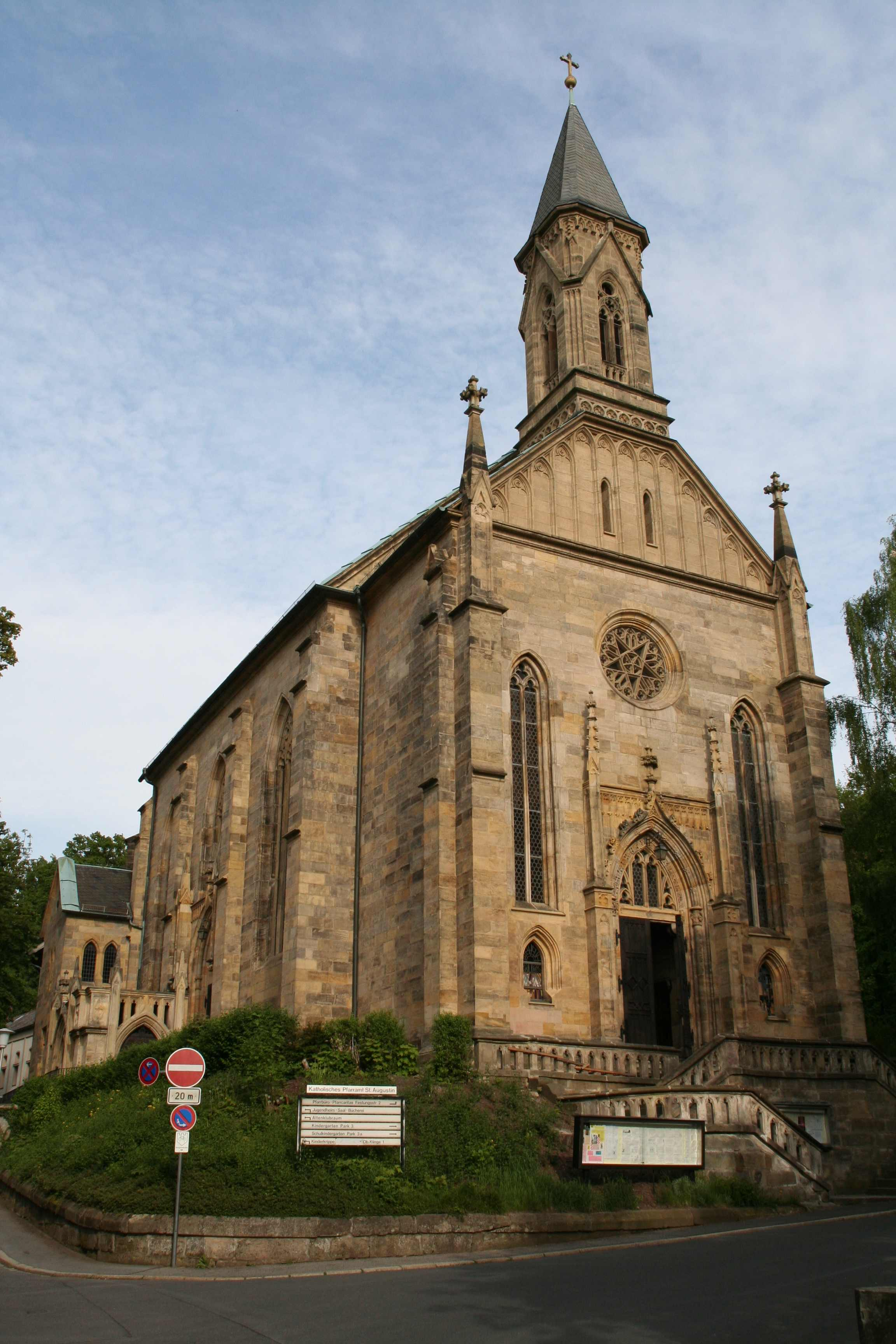
St. Augustin in Coburg

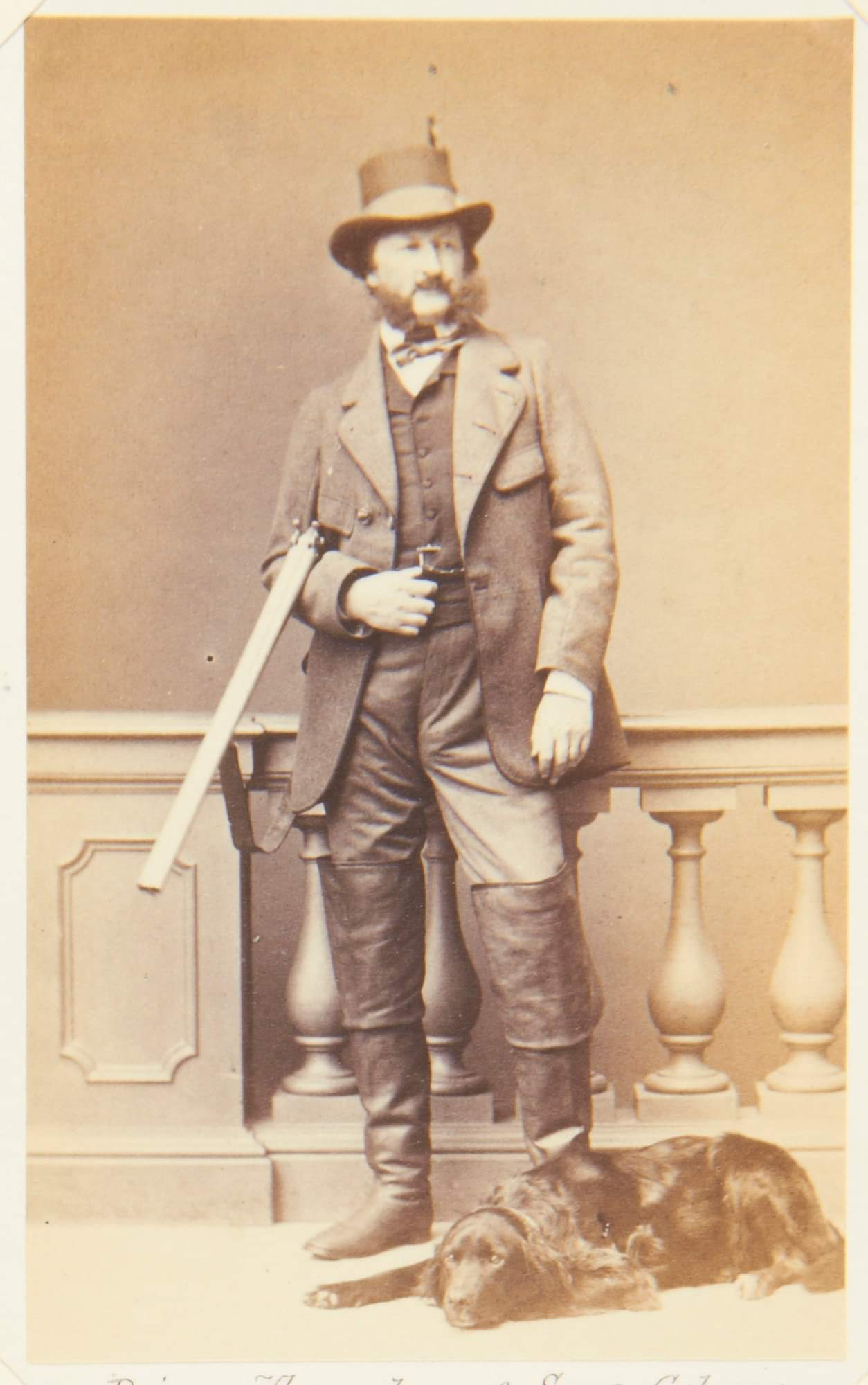
Photograph of August, undated

Prince August built a Catholic church in Coburg. It was consecrated in 1860 and was named St. Augustin. He was later buried in the crypt below this church, as were his wife, his three sons, his daughter-in-law Leopoldina and her four sons.

August was a recipient of the Grand Cross of the Saxe-Ernestine House Order, the Portuguese royal Order of the Tower and Sword, the French Legion of Honour and the Belgian royal Order of Leopold. Furthermore, he was a knight of honour and devotion in the Sovereign Military Order of Malta.

== Memorial ==
In 1885, the Austrian sculptor Viktor Tilgner was commissioned to create a memorial for the late Prince August. The sculpture still stands on private land in Ebenthal owned by the Saxe-Coburg ducal family. The base of the sculpture contains a Latin inscription and a text in French: Auguste Louis Victor Duc de Saxe Prince de Saxe Cobourg Gotha. À mon mari bien-aimé. 1843 - 1881. Clémentine. ("August Louis Victor, Duke of Saxony, Prince of Saxe-Coburg-Gotha. To my beloved husband." – 1843 is not the year August was born (he was born in 1818), but rather the year he married Clémentine).

== Marriage and issue ==
In Saint-Cloud on 20 April 1843, August married Princess Clémentine of Orléans, daughter of Louis Philippe, King of the French. They had five children:

1. Ferdinand Philipp Maria August Raphael (b. Paris, 28 March 1844 - d. Coburg, 3 July 1921), married on 4 February 1875 to Princess Louise of Belgium. They had two children. They divorced on 15 January 1906.
2. Ludwig August Maria Eudes (b. Château d'Eu, 8 August 1845 - d. Karlsbad, 14 September 1907), married on 15 December 1864 to Princess Leopoldina of Brazil. They had four sons.
3. Marie Adelaide Amalie Clotilde (b. Neuilly, 8 July 1846 - d. Alcsút, Hungary, 3 June 1927), married on 12 May 1864 to Archduke Joseph Karl of Austria. They had seven children.
4. Marie Luise Franziska Amalie (b. Coburg, 23 October 1848 - d. Schloß Biederstein, 6 May 1894), married on 20 September 1875 to Duke Maximilian Emanuel in Bavaria. They had three sons.
5. Ferdinand Maximilian Karl Leopold Maria (b. Vienna, 26 February 1861 - d. Coburg, 10 September 1948), installed as Prince of Bulgaria on 7 July 1887; raised to Tsar of Bulgaria on 22 September [O.S. 9 September] 1908. He married Princess Marie Louise of Bourbon-Parma on 20 April 1893. They had four children, including Boris III of Bulgaria. He married secondly Eleonore Reuss of Köstritz on 28 February 1908. He married thirdly Alžbeta Brezáková on 12 August 1947.

On 2 May 1881, Emperor Franz Joseph I of Austria bestowed upon August and his descendants the style of Hoheit ("Highness"), a higher style in Germany than Durchlaucht ("Serene Highness"), which Ernestine princes were usually entitled to. The reason for the grant was that eight days later Princess Stéphanie of Belgium (younger sister of August's daughter-in-law Louise) was to marry Franz Joseph's son Crown Prince Rudolf; Franz Joseph considered it appropriate that his son's in-laws have a higher rank at the Austrian court.

== Honours ==
He received the following awards:

- Austrian Empire: Knight of the Golden Fleece, 1862
- Belgium: Grand Cordon of the Order of Leopold, 3 June 1844
- Empire of Brazil: Grand Cross of the Southern Cross
- (Saxe-Coburg and Gotha) (Duchy of Saxe-Altenburg) (Saxe-Meiningen) Ernestine duchies: Grand Cross of the Saxe-Ernestine House Order, February 1836
- Kingdom of France: Grand Cross of the Legion of Honour, May 1840
- Sovereign Military Order of Malta: Bailiff Grand Cross of Honour and Devotion
- Kingdom of Portugal: Grand Cross of the Tower and Sword, 23 April 1836
- Kingdom of Saxony: Knight of the Rue Crown, 1848

== Ancestry ==
Ancestors of Prince August of Saxe-Coburg and Gotha

8. Ernest Frederick, Duke of Saxe-Coburg-Saalfeld
4. Francis, Duke of Saxe-Coburg-Saalfeld
9. Duchess Sophie Antoinette of Brunswick-Wolfenbüttel
2. Prince Ferdinand of Saxe-Coburg and Gotha
10. Heinrich XXIV, Count Reuss of Ebersdorf
5. Countess Augusta Reuss of Ebersdorf
11. Countess Karoline Ernestine of Erbach-Schönberg
1. Prince August of Saxe-Coburg and Gotha
12. Ignác József, Count Koháry de Csábrág et Szitnya
6. Ferenc József, Prince Koháry de Csábrág et Szitnya
13. Countess Maria Gabriella Cavriani
3. Princess Mária Antónia Koháry de Csábrág et Szitnya
14. Count Georg Christian von Waldstein zu Wartenberg
7. Countess Maria Antonia von Waldstein zu Wartenberg
15. Countess Elisabeth Ulfeldt
