= Nos Tempos do Imperador =

2020 Brazilian telenovela

- Genre: Telenovela
- Created by: Thereza Falcão; Alessandro Marson
- Written by: Duba Elia; Júlio Fischer; Lalo Homrich; Mônica Sanches; Wendell Bendelack
- Directed by: João Paulo Jabur; Vinícius Coimbra
- Starring: Selton Mello; Mariana Ximenes; Gabriela Medvedovsky; Michel Gomes; Alexandre Nero; Letícia Sabatella; Heslaine Vieira; Daphne Bozaski; João Pedro Zappa
- Theme music composer: Ronaldo Bastos; Milton Nascimento
- Opening theme: "Cais" by Milton Nascimento
- Country of origin: Brazil
- Original language: Portuguese
- No. of seasons: 1
- No. of episodes: 154

Production
- Camera setup: Multi-camera

Original release
- Network: TV Globo
- Release: 9 August 2021 – 4 February 2022

Related
- Novo Mundo

Nos Tempos do Imperador (In the Emperor's Times) is a Brazilian telenovela produced and broadcast by TV Globo. It aired from 9 August 2021 to 4 February 2022. The telenovela is written by Thereza Falcão and Alessandro Marson, with the collaboration of Duba Elia, Júlio Fischer, Lalo Homrich, Mônica Sanches and Wendell Bendelack.

It stars Selton Mello, Mariana Ximenes, Gabriela Medvedovsky, Michel Gomes, Alexandre Nero, Heslaine Vieira, Daphne Bozaski and Letícia Sabatella in the main roles.

The telenovela storyline addresses the late years of Dom Pedro II reign as Brazilian Emperor. Despite being received with mixed reviews in Brazil for its pro-monarchy remarks and racism scandals during the shootings, the show was nominated for the International Emmy Award for Best Telenovela.

== Plot ==
In 1856, the emperor Dom Pedro II (Selton Mello) lives a marriage of appearances with Teresa Cristina (Letícia Sabatella), with whom he was forced to marry at a young age by their parents' political alliance, having with her two daughters: Isabel (Giulia Gayoso) and Leopoldina (Bruna Griphao). Dom Pedro is in love with Countess Luísa (Mariana Ximenes), an educated woman, who fights for the abolitionist cause and for the rights of women, married to Eugênio (Thierry Tremouroux), the emperor's cousin. At the same time there are sisters Pilar (Gabriela Medvedovsky) and Dolores (Daphne Bozaski): the first went to a convent after her mother's death in childhood, growing up among books and dreaming of studying medicine, while the second stayed at home to take care of her father, Colonel Eudoro (José Dumont), growing repressed and illiterate.

Upon returning home and discovering that she was promised in marriage to Tonico (Alexandre Nero), a bad-tempered politician and twice her age, Pilar flees and, on her way, falls in love with the fugitive slave Jorge (Michel Gomes), who doesn't even imagine being the illegitimate son of Colonel Ambrósio (Roberto Bonfim) and Tonico's half brother. With the escape, Dolores is given in marriage to Tonico in the place of Pilar, suffering several mistreatments for being considered "ugly" by him, who does not give up obsessively pursuing Pilar and punishing Samuel, in addition to plotting a coup d'état against Dom Pedro II in a dirty political game. Pilar and Samuel still have as an obstacle Zayla (Heslaine Vieira), who also likes Samuel and is willing to do anything to harm her rival, being the daughter of Cândida (Dani Ornellas) and Olu (Hoji Fortuna), who founded the Little Africa neighborhood, which welcomes freed blacks to give it the opportunity for growth.

The coffee growers Lota (Paula Cohen) and Batista (Luís Melo) dream of moving up in life and to achieve this they use their sons: the ambitious Nélio (João Pedro Zappa), who is Tonico's henchman and gets advantages from it, and the sweet Bernardo (Gabriel Fuentes), whose parents want to force to seduce Isabel or Leopoldina to enter royalty, although he loves Lupita (Roberta Rodrigues), without imagining that she is his father's lover.

== Cast ==
- Selton Mello as Dom Pedro II, Emperor of Brazil
- Mariana Ximenes as Luísa Margarida de Barros Portugal, Countess of Barral
- Gabriela Medvedovsky as Maria do Pilar Cavalcanti Mendes
- Michel Gomes as Jorge de Sá / Samuel Rocha
- Alexandre Nero as Antônio "Tonico" Rocha
- Heslaine Vieira as Zayla Maquemba
- Daphne Bozaski as Dolores Cavalcanti Mendes
- Letícia Sabatella as Teresa Cristina de Bragança, Empress of Brazil
- Thierry Tremouroux as Eugênio de Barros, Conde de Barral
- João Pedro Zappa as Nélio Pindaíba
- Vivianne Pasmanter as Germana Ferreira
- Guilherme Piva as Licurgo Ferreira
- José Dumont as Coronel Eudoro Villar
- Paula Cohen as Carlota "Lota" Maria Pindaíba
- Ernani Moraes as João Batista Pindaíba "Batista"
- Roberta Rodrigues as Lupita
- Gabriel Fuentes as Bernardo Pindaíba
- Giulia Gayoso as Isabel, Princess Imperial of Brazil
- Bruna Griphao as Princess Leopoldina of Brazil
- Dani Ornellas as Cândida Maquemba
- Hoji Fortuna as Olu Maquemba
- Maria Clara Gueiros as Vitória Milmann Martinho
- Augusto Madeira as Joaquim Martinho Filho "Quinzinho"
- Dani Barros as Clemência Martinho
- Lu Grimaldi as Lurdes
- Cassio Pandolfi as Nicolau
- Bel Kutner as Celestina
- Jackson Antunes as Luís Alves de Lima e Silva, Duke of Caxias
- Mary Sheila as Abena Nilaja
- Alan Rocha as Balthazar Nilaja
- Cinara Leal as Justina
- Maicon Rodrigues as Guebo Nilaja
- Daniel Dal Farra as Capitão Borges
- Raffaele Casuccio as Nino Sorrento
- Carolina Ferman as Jerusa
- Thor Becker as Dominique de Barros
- Daniel Torres as Gaston, Count of Eu
- Gil Coelho as Prince Ludwig August of Saxe-Coburg and Gotha
- Lana Rhodes as Eliza Lynch
- Ingrid Guimarães as Elvira Matamouros
- Cyria Coentro as Ana Néri
- Alcemar Vieira as José de Alencar

== Production ==
Thereza Falcão and Alessandro Marson started to develop the synopsis of the telenovela in September 2017 while still working on Novo Mundo. In December of that year it was revealed that the new telenovela would be a continuation of the previous plot and that it would continue to be centered in Imperialist Brazil, but taking place 40 years after the closure of Novo Mundo, addressing the period when Dom Pedro II, Emperor of Brazil was in power. The synopsis was approved in May 2018. Initially Nos Tempos do Imperador would debut in September 2019, replacing Órfãos da Terra. In January of that year, however, it was announced that production had switched places with Éramos Seis, who would be its replacement, and would now premiere in the first half of 2020, since production faced difficulties in adapting the historical facts to the plot.

Filming began in January 2020, using Chapada Diamantina, in Bahia, and cities in the interior of Rio de Janeiro, Barra do Piraí, Rio das Flores and Petrópolis, known as "City of Dom Pedro II", because it is one of the cities where the emperor had lived, including the former Imperial Palace. The city scenery was designed by scenographers Paula Salles and Paulo Renato and built in an area of 8,200 square meters, reproducing places in Rio de Janeiro such as Valongo Wharf, Rua do Ouvidor, Passeio Público and the old neighborhood of Pequena África, beyond the interior of the palace and houses. Most sets were reused from Novo Mundo. Among the historical themes chosen to address in the telenovela, the abolitionist struggle, the first acts of women's rights and the causes that led to the Paraguayan War were selected.

On 16 March 2020, it was announced that filming of the telenovela was suspended indefinitely due to the COVID-19 pandemic. The premiere was postponed as well as it was originally scheduled to premiere on 30 March 2020.

=== Casting ===
Emilio Dantas was the first name confirmed as the protagonist Dom Pedro II, but he was replaced by Selton Mello, who accepted the invitation to join the plot, as the network tried to convince him to return to telenovelas after two decades ago. Although he claimed that he would never return to telenovelas and focused on his career in cinema, Selton decided to accept the invitation because he was interested in the imperialist theme, this being his first telenovela in twenty-one years, since Força de um Desejo in 1999. Andreia Horta would play Empress Teresa Cristina, and even went so far as to give details about the character, however, with the postponement of the telenovela, the actress decided to accept the invitation to star in another telenovela and was replaced by Renata Gaspar. Renata, however, was considered very inexperienced in the area of drama after the first readings of the script and the role went to Letícia Sabatella.

As Nos Tempos do Imperador is a continuation of Novo Mundo, the writers chose six characters to bring back from the previous telenovela. Quinzinho and Vitória, who were young children in the first plot, are now portrayed by Augusto Madeira and Maria Clara Gueiros, while the governess of the palace Lurdes, which was played by Bia Guedes, now returns to the age of 60 to be played by Lu Grimaldi. Vivianne Pasmanter, Guilherme Piva and Ingrid Guimarães return with their original characters Germana, Licurgo and Elvira Matamouros, however, now 80 years old. For that to happen, the three received special effects makeup.

== Ratings ==
| Season | Episodes | First aired | | Last aired | | Avg. viewers (points) |
| Season | Episodes | Date | Viewers (points) | Date | Viewers (points) | Avg. viewers (points) |
|---|---|---|---|---|---|---|
| 1 | 154 | 9 August 2021 | 19.1 | 4 February 2022 | 17.6 | 16.9 |

Premiering after more than a year of postponements and following the reruns of three telenovelas, Nos Tempos do Imperador registered a rating of 19.1 points for its pilot episode on 9 August 2021, the worst for the 6 p.m. telenovela time slot (novelas das seis) in eight years.

On 27 November 2021, the 96th episode of Nos Tempos do Imperador saw a rating of only 9.3 points, the lowest rating for the time slot in 37 years since Amor com Amor Se Paga registered a 4.0 points rating on 18 April 1984 because of a massive blackout in the Southeast region of Brazil (the latter telenovela otherwise averaged 40 points, unlike the former which consistently drew ratings below 20 points). The said episode of Nos Tempos do Imperador lost out to the broadcast of the 2021 Copa Libertadores Final on the usually third-ranked channel SBT, which drew a rating of 27.3 points.
