= List of Brazilian royal consorts =

The consorts of Brazil were the spouses of the reigning monarchs, using the titles of Queen of Brazil or Empress of Brazil from the establishment of the United Kingdom of Portugal, Brazil and the Algarves in 1815 to the abolition of the Empire of Brazil in 1889. Brazil had a reigning Queen (Maria I), but was already widowed at the time of her reign and therefore there was never officially a male consort.

== Queen consort of the Kingdom of Brazil ==
=== House of Braganza, 1815–1822 ===
Portrait	Name	Father	Birth	Marriage	Became Queen	Ceased to be Queen	Death	Spouse
	Carlota Joaquina of Spain	Charles IV of Spain (Bourbon)	25 April 1775	8 May 1785	20 March 1816 husband's accession	7 September 1822 independence of Brazil	7 January 1830	John VI

== Empress consort of the Empire of Brazil ==
=== House of Braganza, 1822–1889 ===
Portrait	Name	Father	Birth	Marriage	Became Empress	Ceased to be Empress	Death	Spouse
	Maria Leopoldina of Austria	Francis II, Holy Roman Emperor (Habsburg-Lorraine)	22 January 1797	6 November 1817	12 October 1822 husband's accession	11 December 1826		Pedro I
	Amélie of Leuchtenberg	Eugène de Beauharnais (Beauharnais)	31 July 1812	2 August 1829		7 April 1831 husband's abdication	26 January 1873	Pedro I
	Teresa Cristina of the Two Sicilies	Francis I of the Two Sicilies (Bourbon-Two Sicilies)	14 March 1822	30 May 1843		15 November 1889 husband's exile	28 December 1889	Pedro II

== See also ==
- List of Brazilian monarchs
- List of Portuguese consorts
- Princess of Brazil
