= Michel Gomes =

Brazilian actor (born 1989)

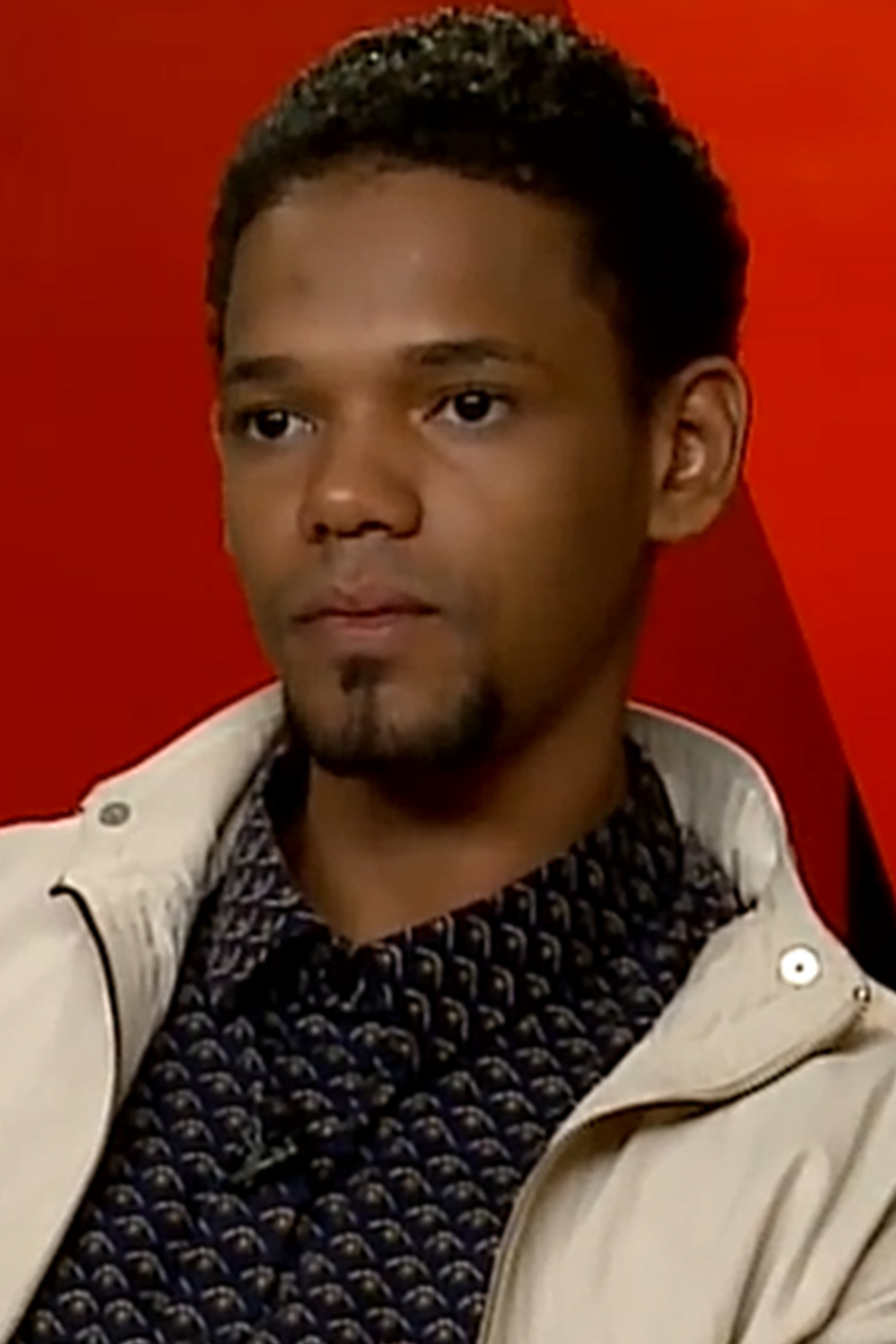
- Gomes in November 2016
- Born: Michel de Souza Gomes; 4 February 1989 (age 37); Rio de Janeiro, Brazil
- Occupation: Actor
- Years active: 2000–present

Michel de Souza Gomes (born 4 February 1989) is a Brazilian actor. He is known for his performances in Brazilian television and cinema, including his role in the telenovela Viver a Vida.

== Biography and career ==
Gomes was born in the Padre Miguel neighborhood, in the West zone of Rio. He had the first contact with the theater at TVV (Talentos da Vila Vintém), a theater company founded almost 14 years ago. "Unfortunately, many people living in communities are invisible to society," Gomes stated, who joined the group at age 10 and is still a member. "The company is my place, that's where it all started".

Gomes made his film debut in the 2002 film Cidade de Deus, playing Bené, crime partner of Dadinho / Zé Pequeno in childhood. However, he only gained recognition when he starred in Bruno Barreto's 2008 film, Última Parada 174, based on the true story of Sandro Barbosa do Nascimento, a street boy from Rio who survived the Candelária Chacina and, in June 2000, stole a bus. The film was chosen to represent the country in the dispute for an Oscar nomination for best foreign film in 2009, and was successful.

In 2009, Gomes appeared in the TV series Força-Tarefa as the character Hulk. In the same year, he would make his official debut on television in the novel of 21h Viver a Vida authored by Manoel Carlos. In the plot, she interpreted Paulo, the brother scholar of the protagonist Helena (Taís Araújo) and that was involved with the cunning Soraya (Nanda Costa).

In 2016, he was cast in the Netflix original series 3% as Fernando Carvalho, a wheelchair using participant in the process, which determines who will be granted access to a paradise-like island.

== Filmography ==
=== Television ===
Year	Work	Role
2007	Cidade dos Homens	Fininho
2009	Força-Tarefa	Hulk
2009	Viver a Vida	Paulo Toledo
2011	Rebelde	João Alves
2013	Joia Rara	Curió
2014	Sexo e as Negas	Pindoba
2016-2018	3%	Fernando Carvalho
2021	Nos Tempos do Imperador	Jorge da Silva / Samuel dos Anjos

=== Film ===
Year	Film	Role
2002	Cidade de Deus	Bené (young)
2009	Última Parada 174	Sandro Barbosa do Nascimento
2009	Salve Geral	Xizão
