= Gabriela Medvedovsky =

Brazilian actress

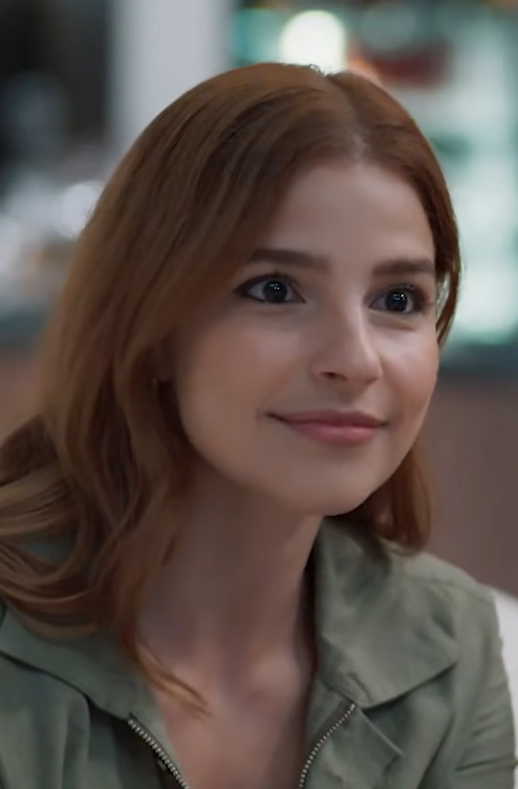
- Medvedovsky in 2026
- Born: Gabriela Andrade Medvedovski; June 29, 1992 (age 34); São Paulo, Brazil
- Occupations: Actress; ballet dancer
- Years active: 2017–present
- Known for: Malhação, As Five, Nos Tempos do Imperador and Três Graças

Gabriela Medvedovsky (born Gabriela Andrade Medvedovski; 29 June 1992) is a Brazilian actress and ballet dancer. She became known for starring in Malhação in 2017, a TV Globo soap opera. She is the protagonist of the series As Five on the Globoplay streaming platform, was in the cast of the soap opera Nos Tempos do Imperador, and starred as Juquinha in the telenovela Três Graças.

== Career ==
In 2014, she was part of the group Teen Broadway, she starred in the productions of The Adventures of Priscilla, Queen of the Desert and Cabaret. In 2015 she played the Crystal Ballerina in the traditional Christmas musical Natal Luz, in Gramado, which celebrated 30 years of performances every end of the year. Between 2016 and 2017 she was part of the cast of the musical Godspell: In Search of Love alongside Leonardo Miggiorin and Beto Sargentelli, playing Robin Lamont. [14] In 2017, he moved to Rio de Janeiro when he passed the tests for Malhação: Viva a Diferença, the twenty-fifth season of youth telenovela, where he won the post of one of the protagonists, Keyla, a teenage mother who suffers prejudice for being above of weight and tries to find the father of her son, an adventure of which she only knows the name. In 2020, she became the protagonist of the series "As Five", Globoplay's original production. In 2021, she was cast to be one of the protagonists of the soap opera Nos Tempos do Imperador. In 2025, Medvedovsky signed a contract with TV Globo to join the cast of the primetime telenovela Três Graças, which aired until May 2026. In the production, she portrayed Eduarda Fragoso, a young police intern popularly known by her nickname "Juquinha". Following the massive international popularity of her on-screen romantic pairing with actress Alanis Guillen, in 2026 TV Globo developed a vertical micro-series spin-off titled Loquinha. Medvedovsky co-starred in the 25-episode vertical project, which was distributed across Globoplay, YouTube, and Globo's official social media platforms.

== Filmography ==
=== Television ===
Year	Title	Role	Notes
2017–2018	Malhação: Viva a Diferença	Keyla Maria Romano	Rede Globo
2020–2024	As Five	Keyla Maria Romano	Globoplay
2021–2022	Nos Tempos do Imperador	Pilar Cavalcanti Mendes	Rede Globo
2025–2026	Três Graças	Eduarda Fragoso "Juquinha"	Rede Globo
2026	Loquinha	Eduarda Fragoso "Juquinha"	Globoplay
2027	Trinta e Tantos	Mirella	Disney+

=== Movies ===
Year	Title	Role
2020	Estação Rock	Catarina
2021	Mais Dançante do Brasil	Eliza Clívia

== Theater ==
Year	Title	Role
2014	Priscila, a Rainha do Deserto	Cyntia
2014	Cabaret	Two Ladies #1
2015	Natal Luz	Crystal Ballerina
2016–17	Godspell: Em Busca do Amor	Robin Lamont
2018–19	Lugar de Escuta - MOTIM	Various characters
2026	Pergunte Alguma Coisa	TBA
