= Imperial Museum of Brazil =

Museum in Petrópolis, Rio de Janeiro, Brazil

Palácio Imperial de Petrópolis
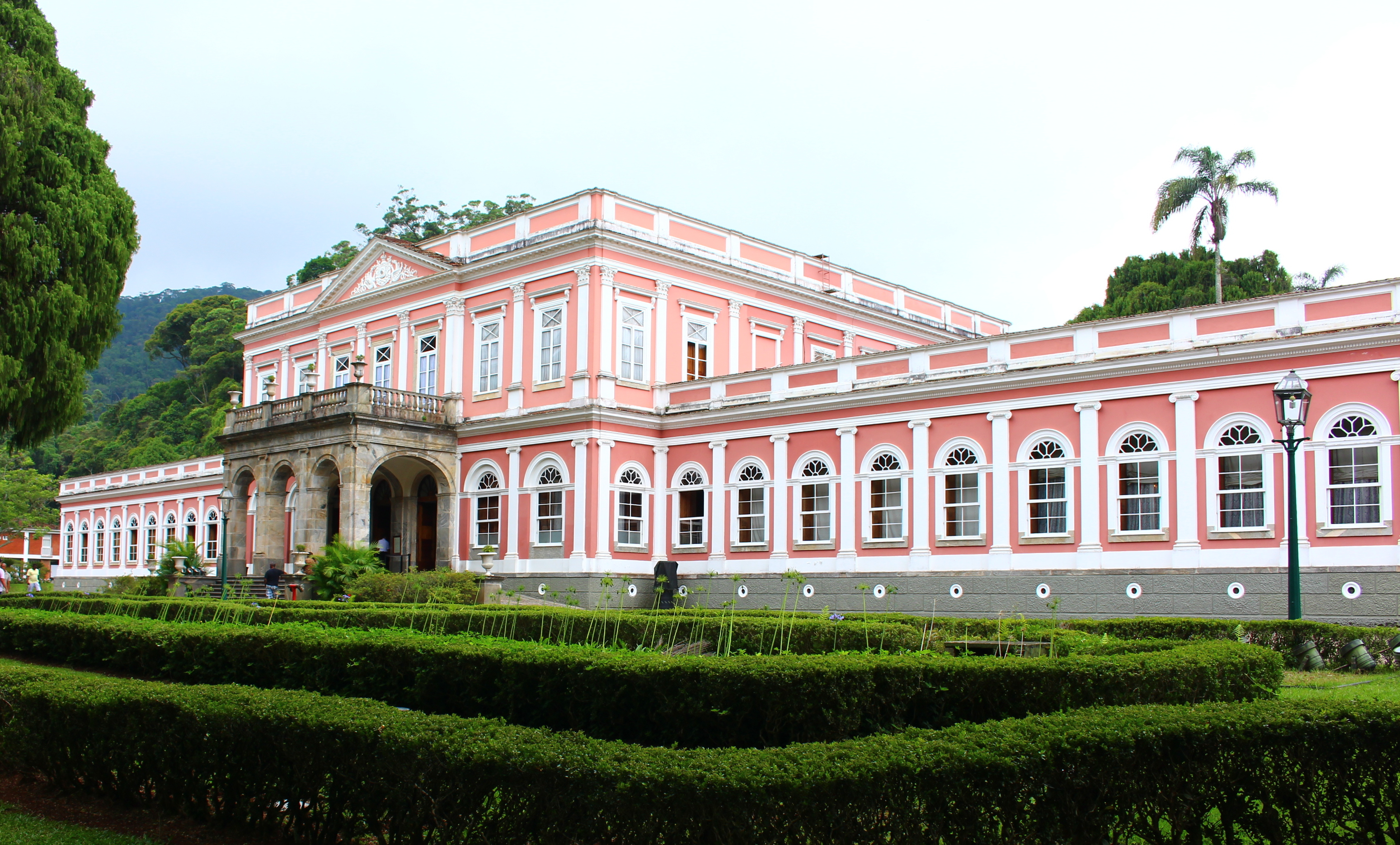
- Petrópolis Imperial Palace
- Interactive fullscreen map

General information
- Architectural style: Neoclassical
- Location: Petrópolis, Brazil
- Coordinates: 22°30′29″S 43°10′31″W
- Current tenants: Imperial Museum of Brazil
- Construction started: 1845
- Completed: 1862
- Client: Pedro II

Technical details
- Floor count: 2

Design and construction
- Architect: Julius Friedrich Koeler

Website
- museuimperial.museus.gov.br

National Historic Heritage of Brazil
- Designated: 166
- Reference no.: 1938

The Museu Imperial de Petrópolis is a museum in the historic center of Petrópolis, Rio de Janeiro, Brazil. It is housed in the Petrópolis Imperial Palace, the former summer residence of Emperor Pedro II (reigned 1831–1889), which was built starting in 1845.

The museum includes the palace itself, pieces of the monarchical past of Brazil, and a temporary exhibition hall dedicated to contemporary art. It is one of the most-visited museums – and was voted the best museum – in the country.

== History ==
=== The building ===
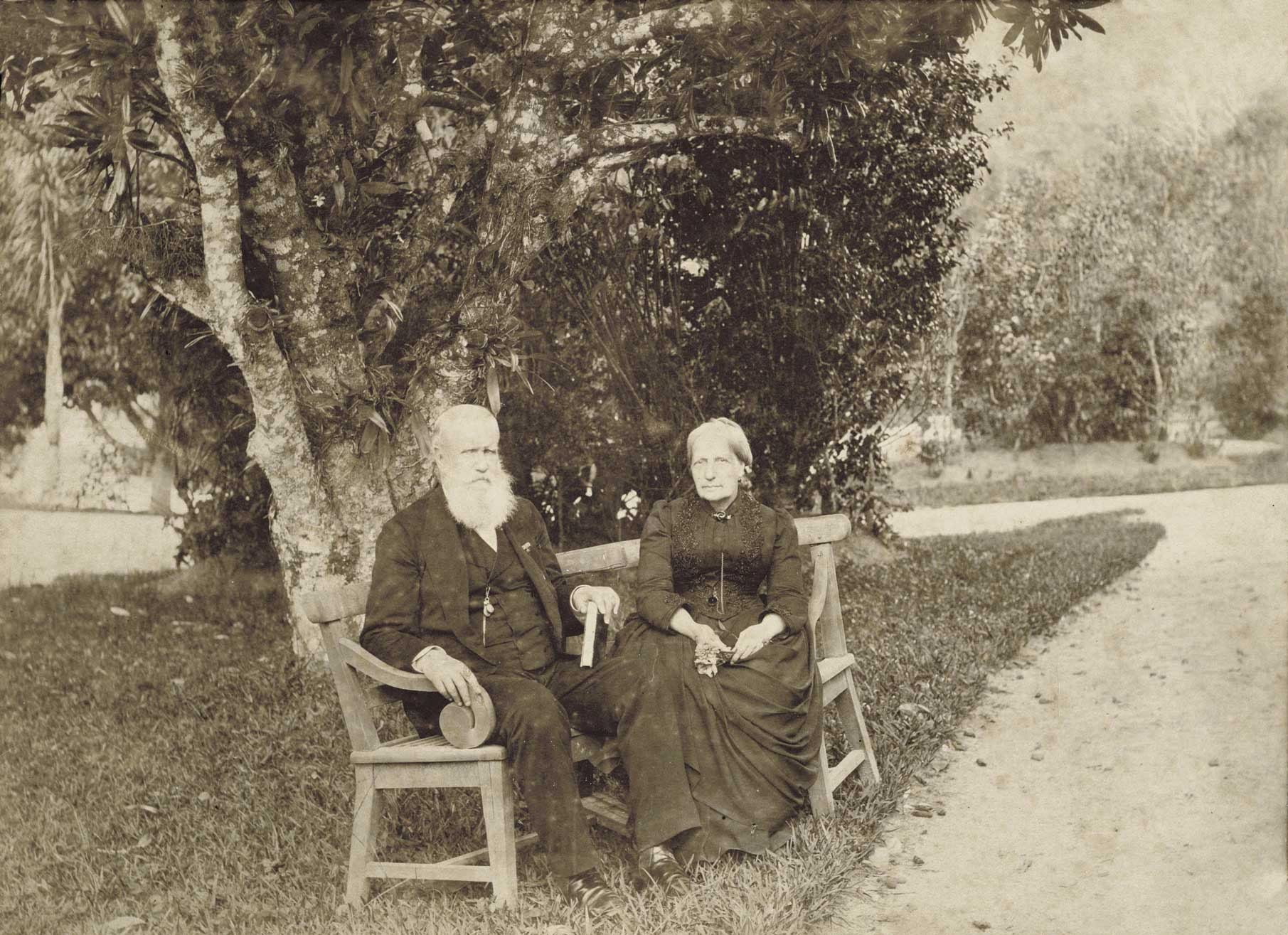
Emperor Pedro II and Empress Teresa Cristina at the Palace's garden in 1888.

In 1822, Emperor Pedro I, traveling to Vila Rica, Minas Gerais, to seek support for the movement of the independence of Brazil, was enchanted with the Atlantic Forest and the mild climate of the mountainous region. He stayed at Padre Correia's estate and even made an offer to buy it. Faced with the owner's refusal, Pedro bought the Córrego Seco estate in 1830, thinking of transforming it one day into the Palace of Concordia.

After his abdication and departure to Portugal, the estate was left as an inheritance for his son, Emperor Pedro II, who would build his favorite summer residence there.

At the behest of Pedro II, the beautiful neoclassical building was constructed beginning in 1845, and it was completed in 1862. To begin construction, Pedro II signed a decree on 16 March 1843, creating the city of Petrópolis. A large contingent of European immigrants, mainly Germans, under the command of the engineer and superintendent of the Imperial Treasury, Major Julius Friedrich Koeler, was commissioned to raise the city, build the palace and colonize the region.

Constructed with resources from the Emperor's personal endowment, the building had the original design elaborated by Koeler himself and, after his death, was modified by Cristoforo Bonini, who added the granite portico to the central body. To conclude the work, important architects linked to the Imperial Academy of Fine Arts were hired: Joaquim Cândido Guillobel and José Maria Jacinto Rebelo, with the collaboration of Manuel de Araújo Porto Alegre in the decoration.

The complex was enriched, still in the 1850s, with the garden planned and executed by the landscaper Jean-Baptiste Binot, under the guidance of the young Emperor. The vestibule floor, in Carrara marble and black marble from Belgium, was laid in 1854, and the floors and frames in hardwoods, such as jacaranda, cedar, pau-satin, rose and vignette, from the various provinces of the Empire.

The stuccoes of the dining rooms, music rooms, visits of the Empress, state and bedroom of their majesties contribute to give grace and beauty to the environments of the Palace, one of the most important architectural monuments in Brazil.

When the foundation stone was laid, there was leveling of the area, which was known as "Morro da Santa Cruz", to start the works, all of which were financed by stewardship of the Imperial House, as Pedro II said, in his private property, one should not use state money.

In the Petrópolis plant, made by Koeler, it is indicated the place of the palace in a quadrilateral between the Emperor Street and the Empress Street. There were still other buildings on the same land, whose identification is impossible to make. The works began in the right wing of the palace, and the foundations came from a nearby quarry. Oxen were used for "Pulling earth, stone and wood". Work was continued on the left wing (which at the beginning was seen to be wider than the right and later was arranged) the Sobrado, where the main entrances to the palace, besides the rooms, were ready. All the rooms were decorated and furnished with beautiful stucco and furniture.

=== The gardens ===
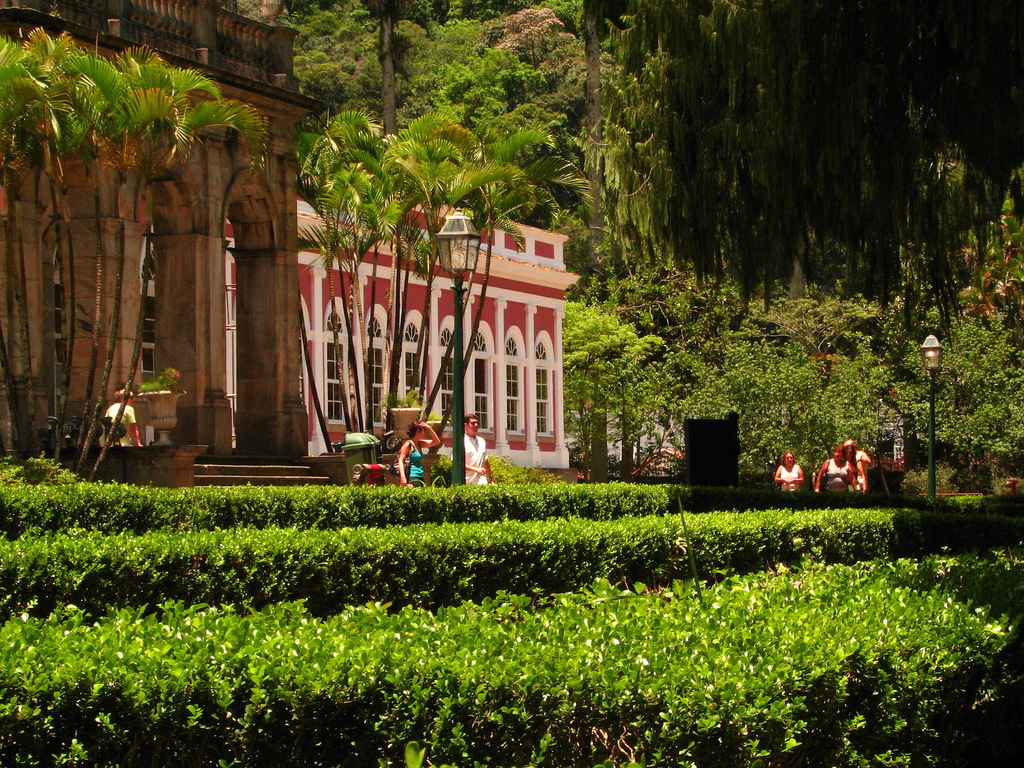
The palace front door garden

It was under the personal guidance of the Emperor that the gardens surrounding the Palace were built by the Parisian landscaper Jean Baptiste Binot in 1854.

With around 100 species of trees and flowers, from more than 15 regions of the world (Mexico, Japan, Argentina, India, Ecuador, China, Australia, Madagascar, among others) and French grass, the gardens still maintain the landscape lines, both in relation to the beds and the arrangement of plant species.

The green belt surrounding the Palace features exotic trees such as Madagascar's banana trees and incense trees, flowers like camellias, jasmins, manacas and emperor flowers. As a complement, granite pedestals where busts of mythological figures were placed, also won three fountains and four fountains. Among them, the Fountain of the Frog, from where the inhabitants drew water, believing that it was of better quality.

The first project presented was from Glaziou, this official landscaper of the Emperor, who designed the gardens of Quinta da Boa Vista and several other parks, but was refused. The gardens were designed by Binot, also French. One can still see the primitive layout of the gardens, from pandals of Africa, palms of Australia, incense trees, among others. The gardens have been modifying and diminishing over time, but they can still be seen and appreciated.

=== Republican era ===
President Getúlio Vargas at the museum's opening, 16 March 1943

With the Republican coup d'état, on 15 November 1889, the Imperial Family was banished and exiled in Europe. In December of the same year, the Empress Teresa Cristina died in Portugal and, two years later, in 1891, Emperor Pedro II died in Paris. Between 1893 and 1908, Isabel, Princess Imperial of Brazil, as sole heiress, rented the Palace of Petrópolis to the Notre Dame de Sion Schoolhouse.

Then between 1909 and 1939, St. Vincent of Paul College functioned in the building. In that period, much of the furniture and other objects were sold or expropriated. President Getúlio Vargas created, on 29 March 1940, by Decree-Law No. 2,096, the Imperial Museum.

From then on, a technical team led by Sodré himself, who would become the first director of the Museum, studied the history of the building and locate pieces belonging to the Imperial Family in different palaces, to illustrate the nineteenth century and day to day of members of the Brazilian House of Braganza. Important national collectors joined the project, donating objects of historical and artistic interest. As a result, the Imperial Museum was inaugurated on March 16, 1943, with a significant collection of pieces related to the Brazilian imperial period, with a ceremony that included members of the Imperial Family. Over the last seven decades, it has accumulated significant documentary collections, bibliographical collections (many from Château d'Eu) and objects thanks to the generous donations of hundreds of citizens, totaling a collection of almost 300,000 items. Much of the interior decoration is still preserved, such as the floors in noble stones, stuccos, chandeliers and furniture, rebuilding the environments.

== Museum ==
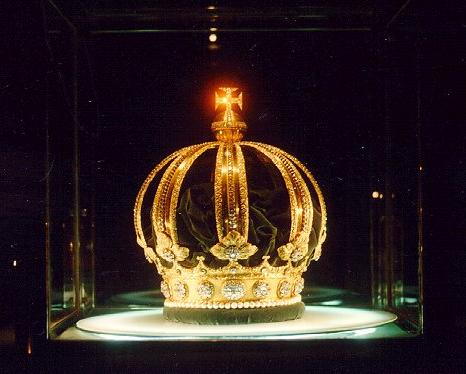
The Imperial Crown of Brazil on display

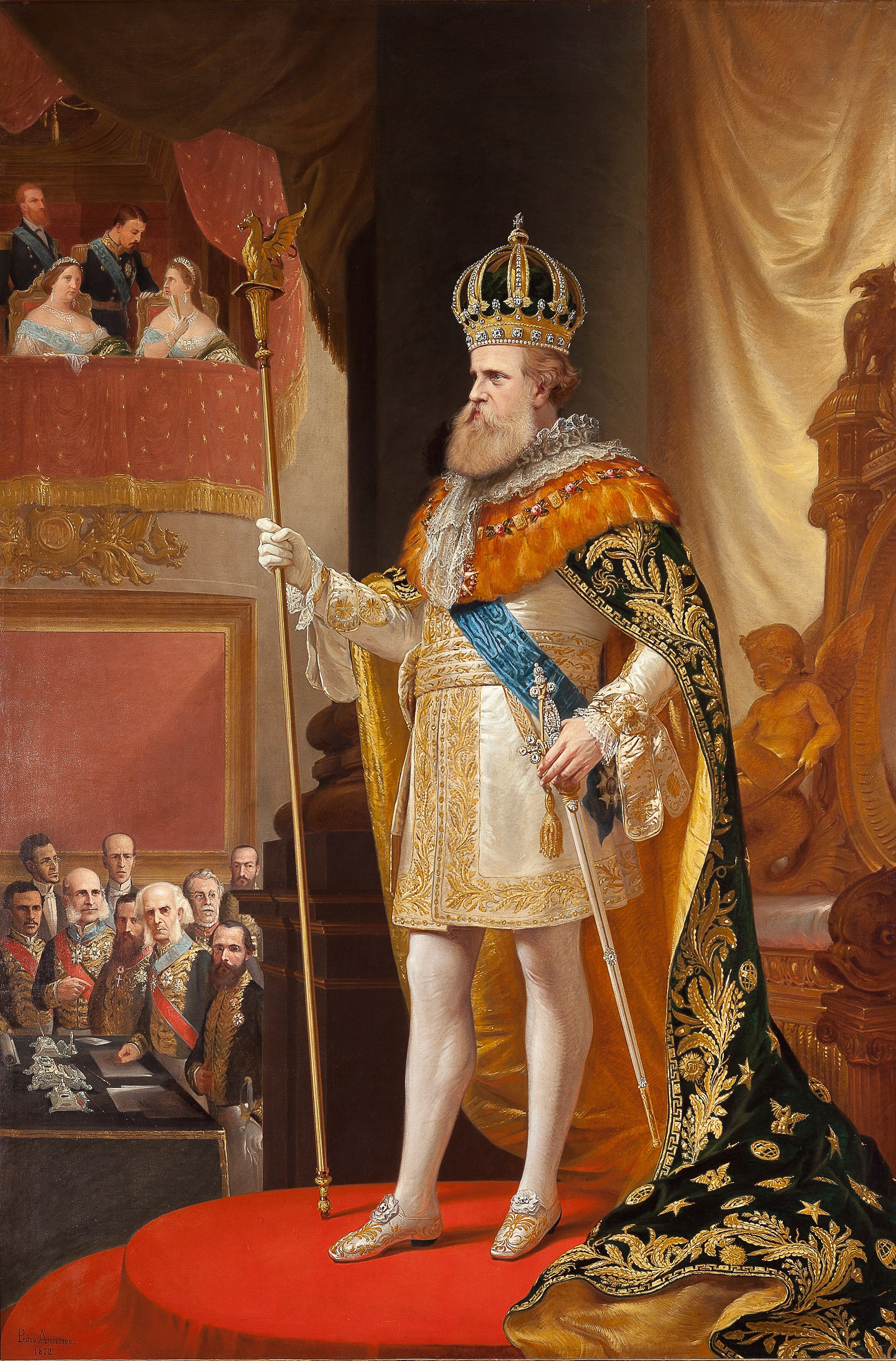
Emperor Pedro II wearing the Imperial Regalia, by Pedro Américo.

The collection of the museum consists of pieces linked to the Brazilian monarchy, including furniture, documents, works of art and personal objects of members of the Imperial Family. In the collection of paintings, we can highlight the "Fala do Trono" by Pedro Américo, representing Emperor Pedro II at the opening of the General Assembly, and the last portrait of Emperor Pedro I, painted by Simplício Rodrigues de Sá.

Particularly important are the imperial jewels, with the crown of Pedro II, created by Carlos Marin especially for the consecration and coronation of the young Emperor, then 15 years old, and the crown of Pedro I, as well as several other rare pieces and precious, such as the gold-bronze and porcelain vault offered by the King of France Louis Philippe I to his son François, Prince of Joinville, on the occasion of his marriage to the Princess Francisca of Brazil; the gold necklace, emeralds and rubies with insignia of the Empire that belonged to the Empress Leopoldina, and the necklace of amethysts of Domitila de Castro, Marchioness of Santos, gift of Pedro I.

The collection is distributed in the following main areas:

- Dining Room, with rich set of furniture signed by F. Léger Jeanselme Père & Fils, and crockery.
- Music Hall, preserving instruments such as a golden harp made by Pleyel Wolff, an eighteenth-century psalter made in Rio de Janeiro and the Broadwood English-made pianoforte, which would, according to tradition, belong to Emperor Pedro I, and the manufactured spinet by Mathias Bosten in 1788, the only one existing in the world of this author. Complete the furniture room tiled in rosewood.
- State Hall, the most important of the palace, where Dom Pedro received official visitors. The throne, originally in the Palace of Quinta da Boa Vista, came only later to the Imperial Museum, along with objects of adornment such as vases, porcelains of Sèvres, consoles and decorated mirrors.
- Emperor Pedro II's Office, where the Emperor spent most of the day amidst scientific instruments and books. There he preserves, among other objects, his lunette, the first telephone of Brazil, which he brought from the United States, his chaise longue and several painted portraits of his family.
- Preserves of the Princesses, preserving the original environments occupied by the Princess Isabel and Princess Leopoldina, with furniture in the style of the King Joseph I of Portugal.
- Living room of the Empress, where Teresa Cristina received her friends privately, for conversations and embroidery sessions, with corresponding furniture.

=== Library ===
The rich library of the Imperial Museum preserves an important bibliographic collection with about 50 thousand volumes, specialized in History (mainly of Brazil in the Imperial period), history of Petrópolis and Arts in general.

The Rare Works section features precious items such as 16th-19th century editions, periodicals, scores, illuminations, manuscripts, ex-libris, reports from Provinces and Ministries, and a collection of Laws of the Empire totaling about 8,000 volumes. Of these pieces, several belonged to the Imperial Family and bring handwritten notes, luxurious bindings and illustrations.

The section of books of foreign travelers that passed through Brazil in the 18th and 19th centuries is also important, documenting several aspects of social life and the Brazilian natural landscape of the time, with works by Jean-Baptiste Debret, Rugendas, Augustin Saint-Hilaire, Maria Graham, Henry Koster, Louis Agassiz, Charles Darwin, Spix and Martius.

=== History archive ===
The museum has a collection of over 250,000 original documents dating from the 13th century and going into the 20th century. Especially interesting is the gathering of photographs documenting the history and evolution of the urban and landscape aspects of the state of Rio de Janeiro and the city of Petrópolis.

Several private collections enrich this section, such as João Lustosa da Cunha Paranaguá, 2nd Marquis of Paranaguá; that of Ambrósio Leitão da Cunha, Baron Mamoré; the Barral-Monteferrat Collection, with the correspondence between Emperos Pedro II and the Countess of Barral; the important Archive of the Brazilian Imperial House, and several others.

=== Projects ===
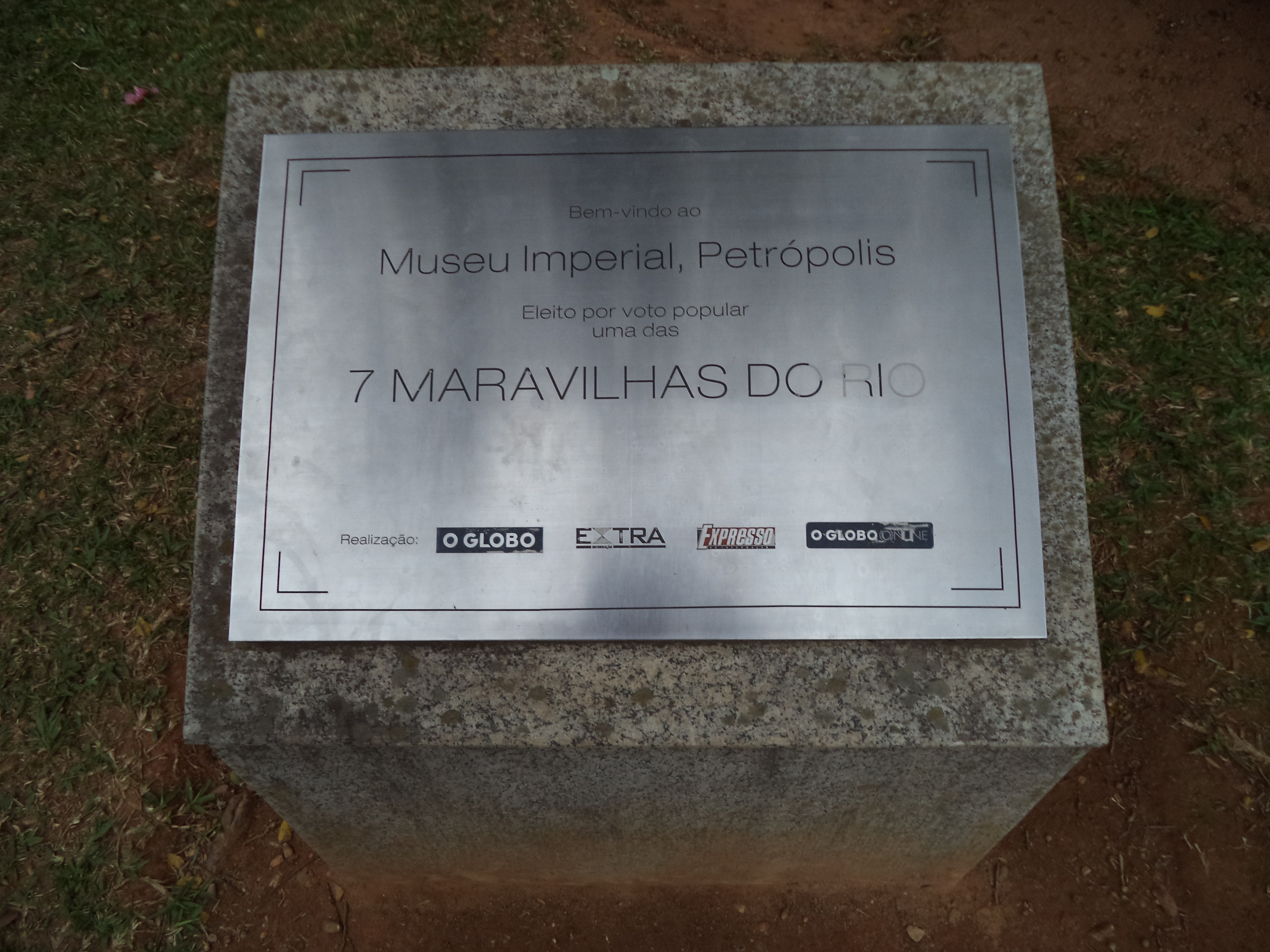
Plate honoring the museum as one of the 7 wonders of Rio de Janeiro

- Visual Arts Program, in partnership with FUNARTE, seeks to hold exhibitions, multidisciplinary seminars, courses and workshops, in order to train professionals, train new audiences and broaden the knowledge of the general public. It also seeks to discuss issues relating to museology, national collections and the evolution of contemporary visual arts.
- Patrimonial Education, a perennial project of the museum, which aims to educate adults and children about the conscious appropriation and critical valuation of their cultural heritage, strengthening the sense of identity and citizenship. Subsidizing this project, the museum conducts guided tours, puppet theater workshops for children, nineteenth-century music recitals reconstituting the spirit of aristocratic serenades, and other educational activities.
- DAMI (Imperial Museum Collection Digitization Project), provides free images of the entire collection of the Imperial Museum on the internet. Books, documents, and objects of all types are scanned and have their information displayed on the project page. There are already thousands of objects and documents available for download.

== Gallery ==
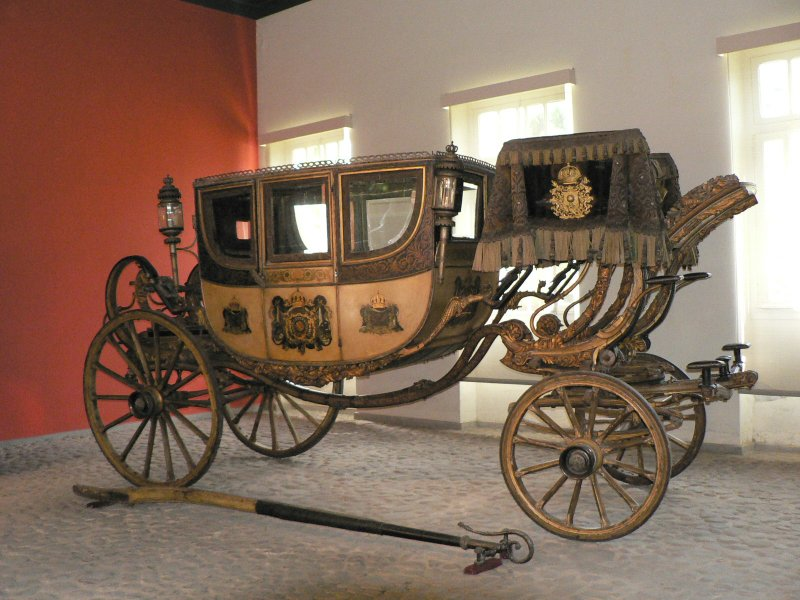
Imperial Carriage of Emperor Pedro II

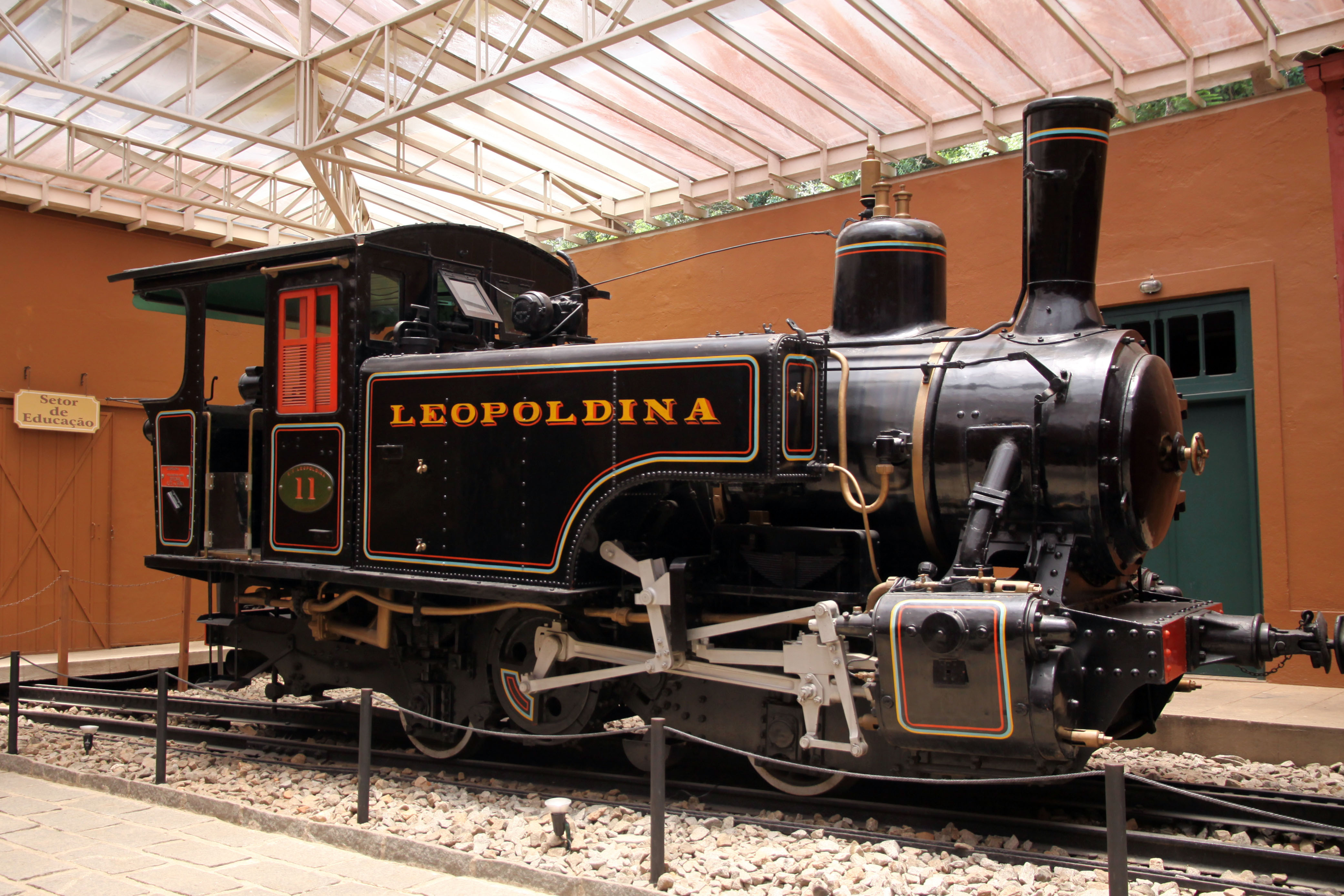
The no. 11 was used on the Leopoldina Railway, which ran between Rio de Janeiro and Petrópolis.

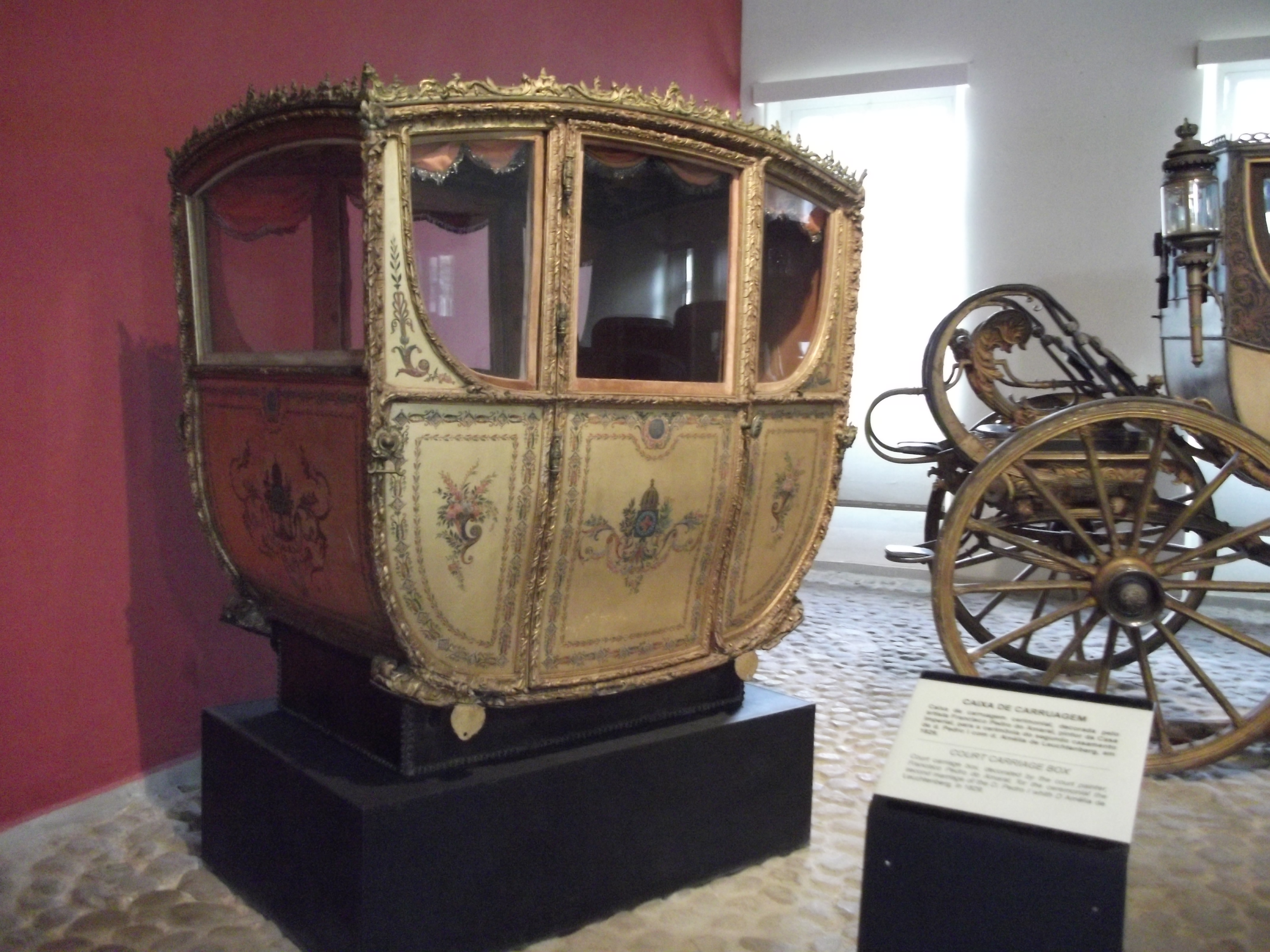
Carriage Box,
decorated by
Francisco Pedro do Amaral

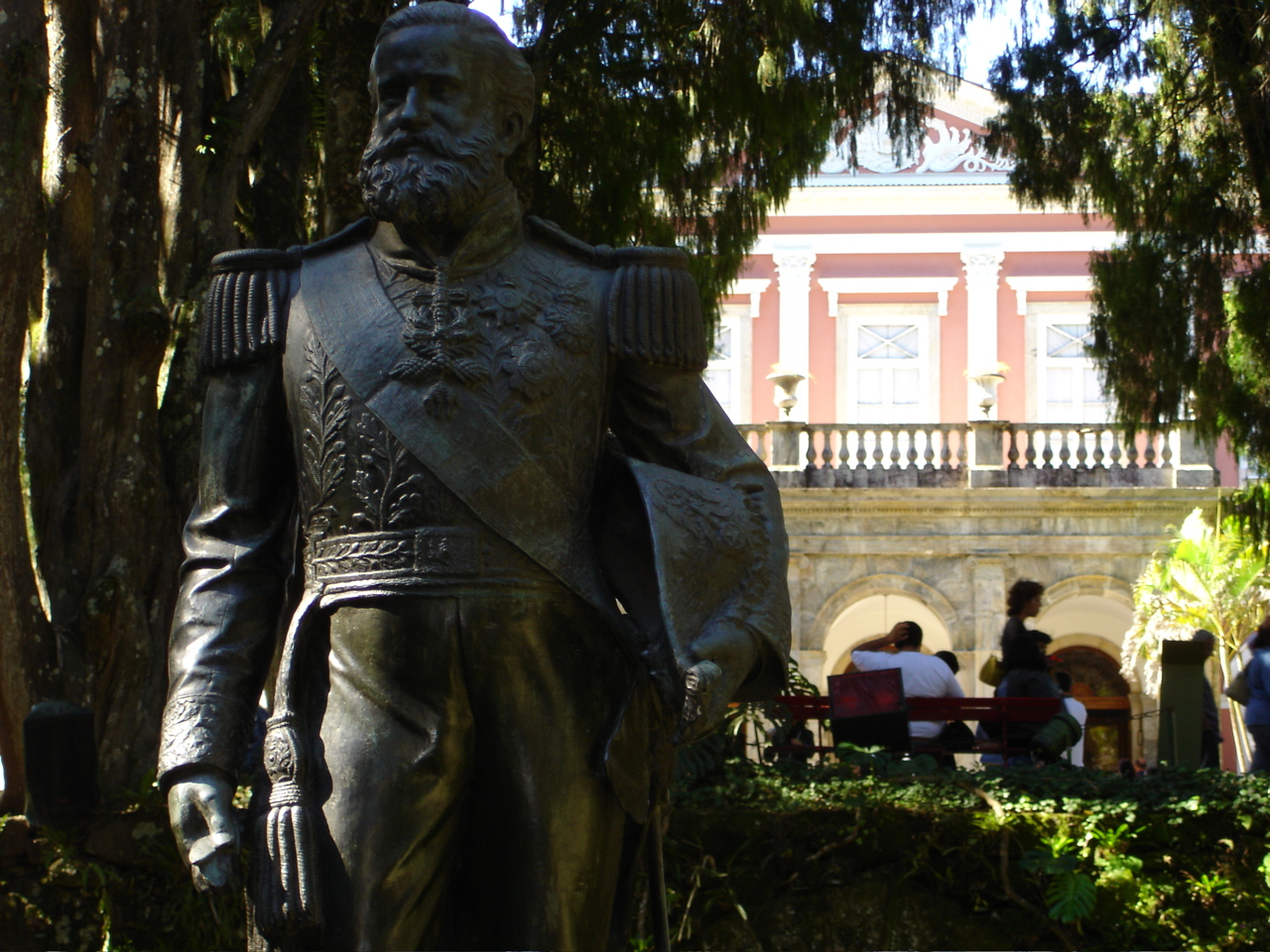
Statue of
Emperor Pedro II

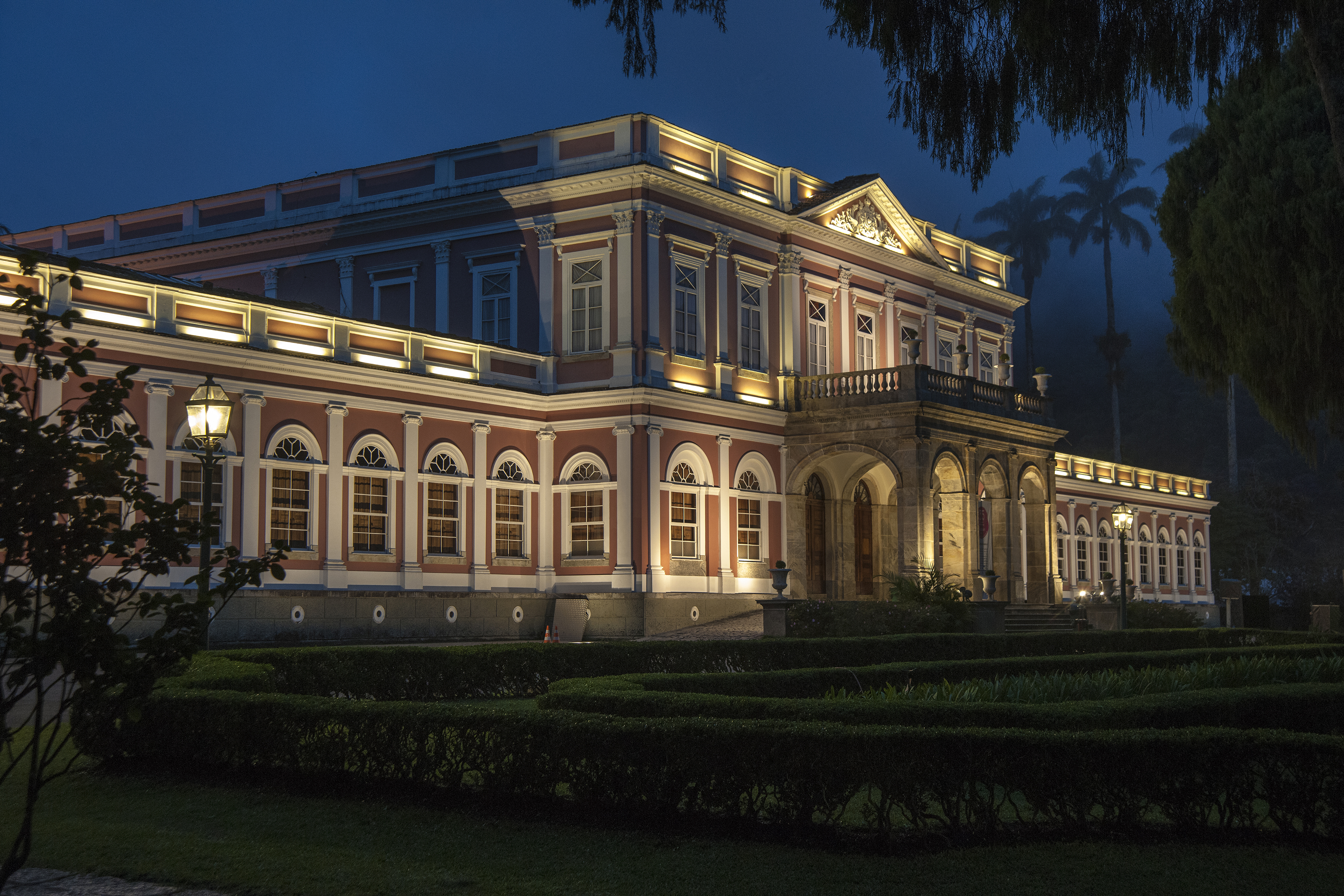
The building at night
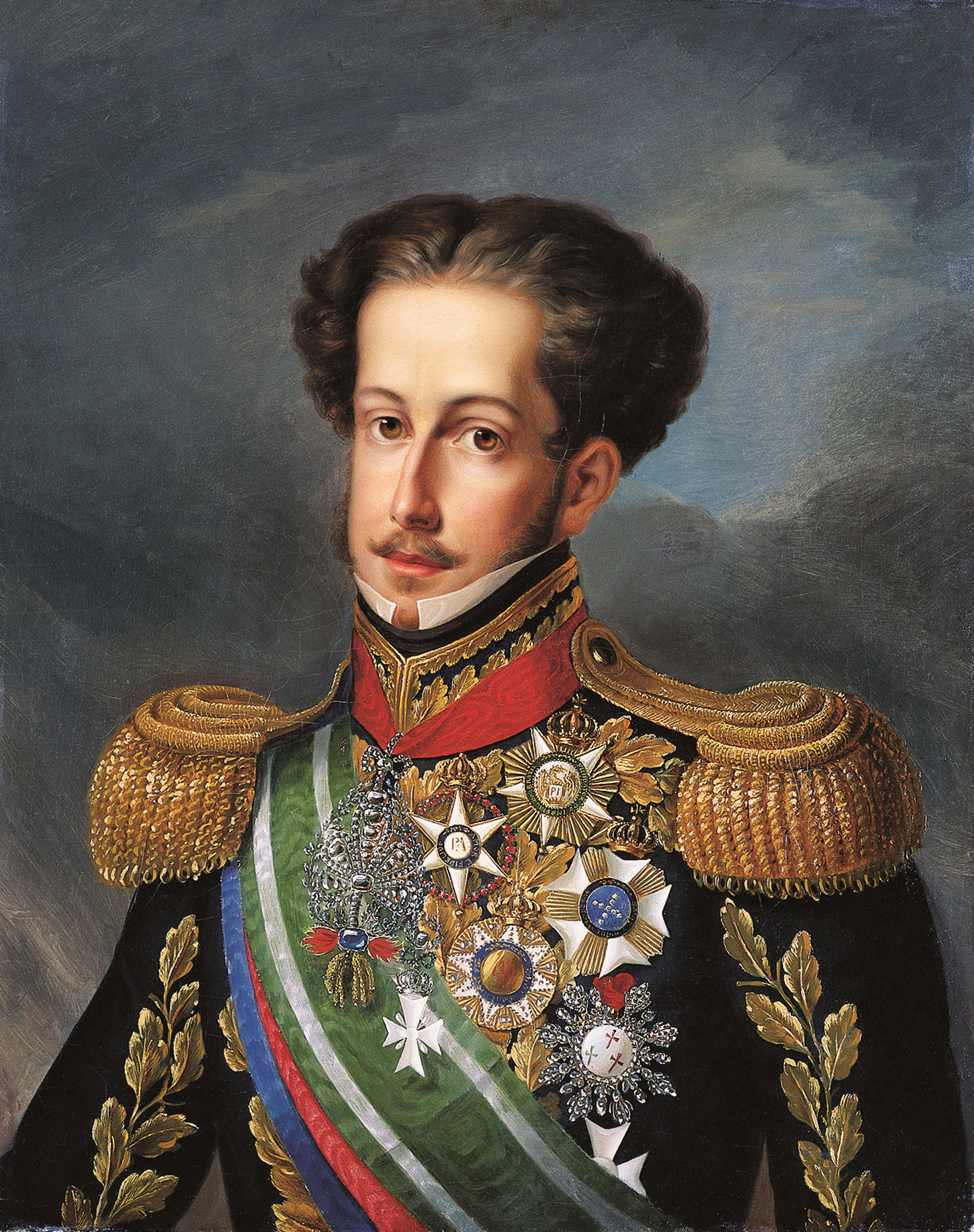
Portrait of Emperor Pedro I by Simplício Rodrigues de Sá

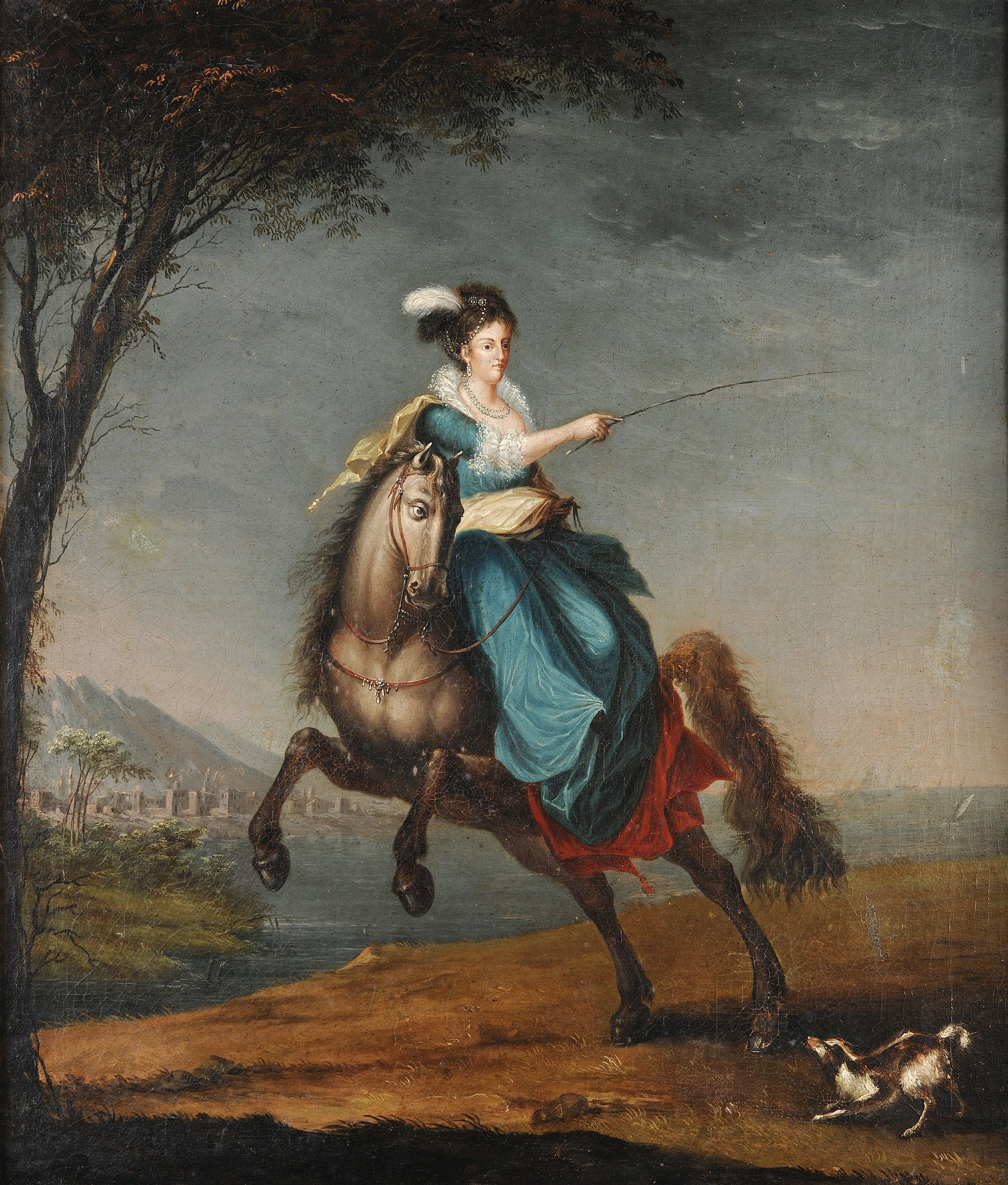
Equestrian portrait of Queen Carlota Joaquina by Domingos Sequeira

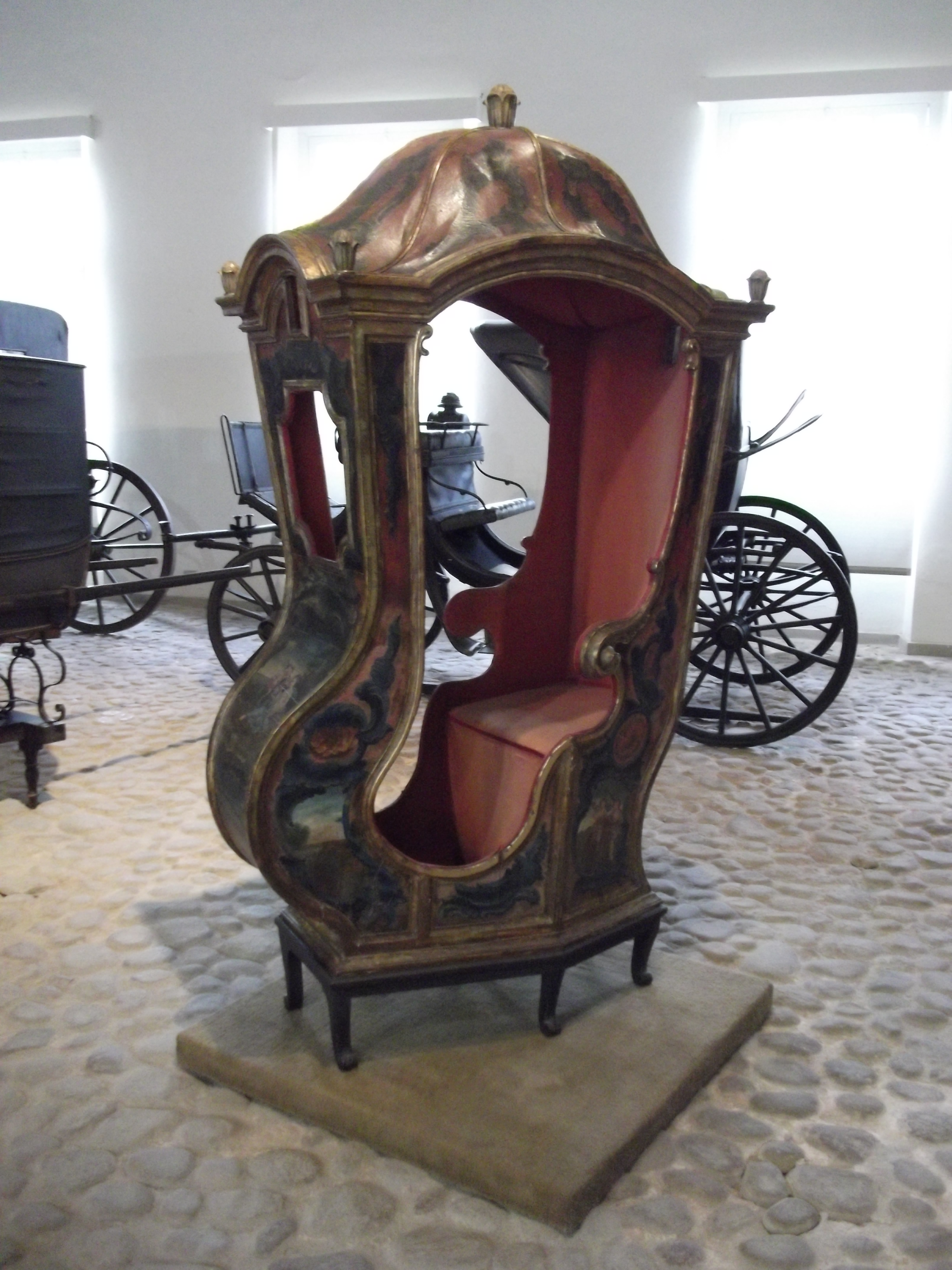
Chair where the slave owners were carried
