= Teresa Cristina of the Two Sicilies =

Empress of Brazil from 1843 to 1889

Teresa Cristina
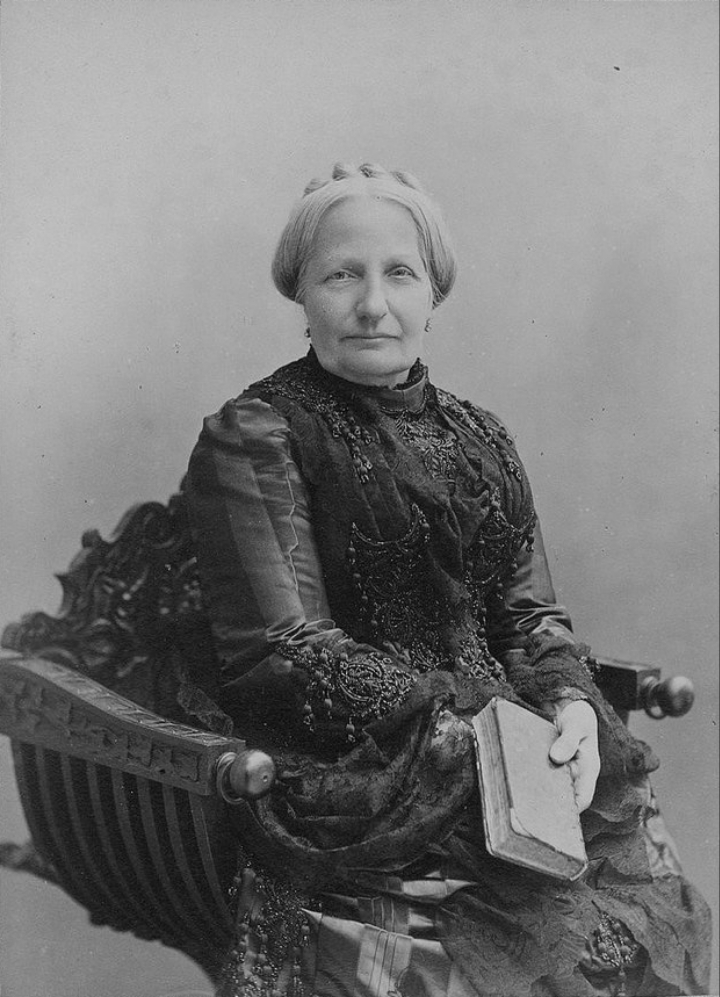
- Portrait c. 1888

Empress consort of Brazil
- Tenure: 30 May 1843 – 15 November 1889
- Born: 14 March 1822; Naples, Two Sicilies
- Died: 28 December 1889 (aged 67); Porto, Portugal
- Burial: 5 December 1939; Cathedral of Petrópolis, Petrópolis, Brazil
- Spouse: Pedro II of Brazil (m. 1843)
- Issue Detail: Afonso, Prince Imperial of Brazil; Isabel, Princess Imperial of Brazil; Leopoldina, Princess Ludwig August of Saxe-Coburg and Gotha; Pedro Afonso, Prince Imperial of Brazil
Names
- Teresa Cristina Maria Giuseppa Gaspare Baltassare Melchiore Gennara Francesca de Padova Donata Bonosa Andrea d'Avelino Rita Luitgarda Geltruda Venancia Taddea Spiridione Rocca Matilde di Borbone delle Due Sicilie
- House: Bourbon-Two Sicilies
- Father: Francis I of the Two Sicilies
- Mother: María Isabella of Spain
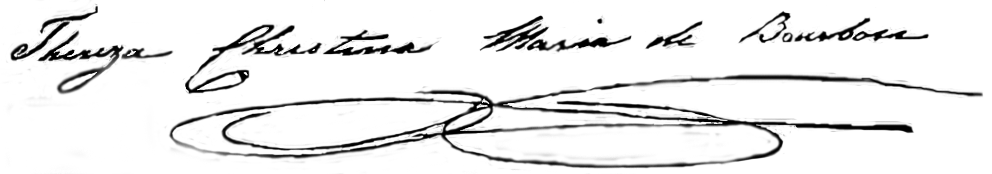
- Signature

Dona Teresa Cristina (14 March 1822 – 28 December 1889), popularly known as "the Mother of the Brazilians", was Empress of Brazil as the wife of Emperor Dom Pedro II, a position she held from her marriage in 1843 until the abolition of the monarchy in 1889. Born a princess of the Kingdom of the Two Sicilies, in present-day southern Italy, she was the daughter of King Francis I of the Italian branch of the House of Bourbon and his wife, Maria Isabella of Spain. Long portrayed by historians as timid and politically passive, modern scholarship has reassessed Teresa Cristina as a more complex figure, recognizing her intellectual curiosity, cultural patronage, and a quiet but consistent assertion of personal independence within the constraints of 19th-century court life.

The Princess was married by proxy to Pedro II in 1843. Her spouse's expectations had been raised when a portrait was presented that depicted Teresa Cristina as an idealized beauty, but he was displeased by his bride's appearance upon their first meeting later that year. Despite a cold beginning on the part of Pedro, the couple's relationship improved as time passed, due primarily to Teresa Cristina's patience, kindness and generosity. These traits also helped her win the hearts of the Brazilian people, and her distance from political controversies shielded her from criticism. She also sponsored archaeological studies in Italy and Italian immigration to Brazil.

The marriage between Teresa Cristina and Pedro II never became passionately romantic, although a bond based upon family, mutual respect and fondness did develop. The Empress was a dutiful spouse and unfailingly supported the Emperor's positions and never interposed with her own views in public. She remained silent on the topic of his suspected extra-marital relationships—including a liaison with her daughters' governess. In turn, she was treated with unfailing respect and her position at court and home was always secure. Of the imperial couple's four children, two boys died in infancy and a daughter died of typhoid fever at the age of 24.

The imperial family was sent into exile after a coup d'état in 1889. Being cast from her beloved adopted land had a devastating effect on Teresa Cristina's spirit and health. Grieving and ill, she died of respiratory failure leading to cardiac arrest a month after the monarchy's collapse. She was greatly loved by her subjects, both during her lifetime and afterwards. She was even respected by the republicans who overthrew the Empire. Despite having had no direct impact on Brazil's political history, Teresa Cristina is well regarded by historians not only for her character and irreproachable behavior, but also for her sponsorship of Brazilian culture.

== Early life ==
=== Birth ===
Teresa Cristina was the daughter of the then-Duke of Calabria, who later became King Don Francesco I (Francis I) of the Two Sicilies. Through her father, she was a member of the House of Bourbon-Two Sicilies, also known as Bourbon-Naples, the Italian branch of the Spanish Bourbons. She was a descendant of France's "Sun King", Louis XIV in the male line through his grandson, Don Felipe V (Philip V) of Spain. Teresa Cristina's mother was the Infanta Doña Maria Isabel (Maria Isabella), daughter of King Don Carlos IV (Charles IV) of Spain, and a younger sister of Doña Carlota Joaquina — who was the wife of King Dom João VI of Portugal and the paternal grandmother of Teresa Cristina's future husband. She was their sixth and youngest daughter and the tenth out of their twelve children.

Born on 14 March 1822 in Naples, Teresa Cristina became an orphan when her father died in 1830. Her mother is said to have neglected her after marrying a young officer in 1839. Historiography has long asserted that she was raised in lonely isolation, in an environment of religious superstition, intolerance and conservatism. It has also described Teresa Cristina as a soft and timid character, unlike her ruthless father or her impulsive mother. She has even been depicted as unassertive, and accustomed to be satisfied in whatever circumstances she found herself.

Some historians have more recently held to a modified view of both the Neapolitan Bourbon court as a reactionary regime and of the extent of Teresa Cristina's passivity. Historian Aniello Angelo Avella states that the maligned interpretation of the Neapolitan Bourbons traces its origin to perspectives generated during the 19th century il Risorgimento (Italian unification) following the 1861 conquest of the Kingdom of the Two Sicilies by the Kingdom of Sardinia. Teresa Cristina is revealed in her personal papers as a strong-headed character. She "was not a submissive woman but instead a person who respected the roles imposed by the ethics and values of her own times."

=== Marriage ===
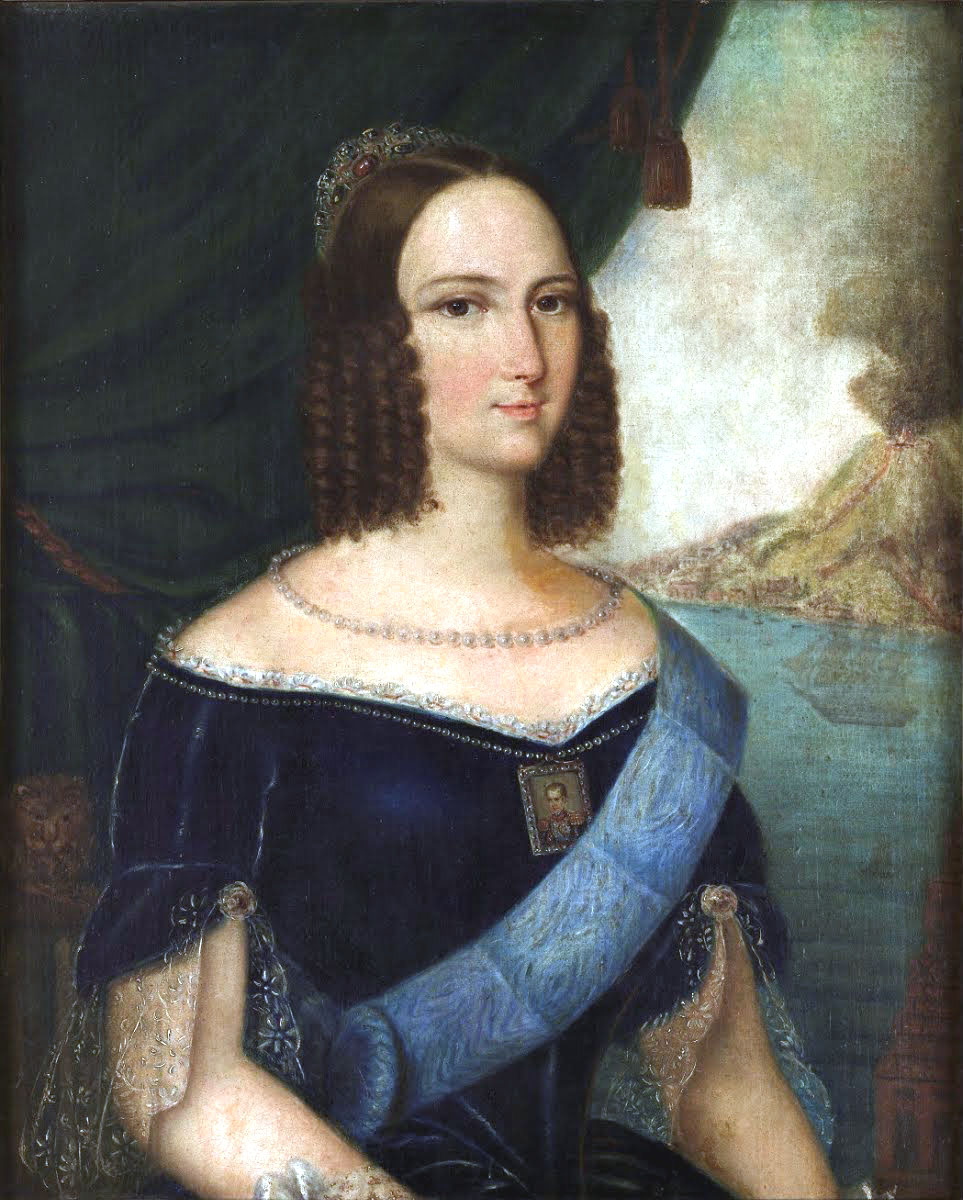
The portrait of Teresa Cristina that enticed Pedro II to accept the marriage proposal

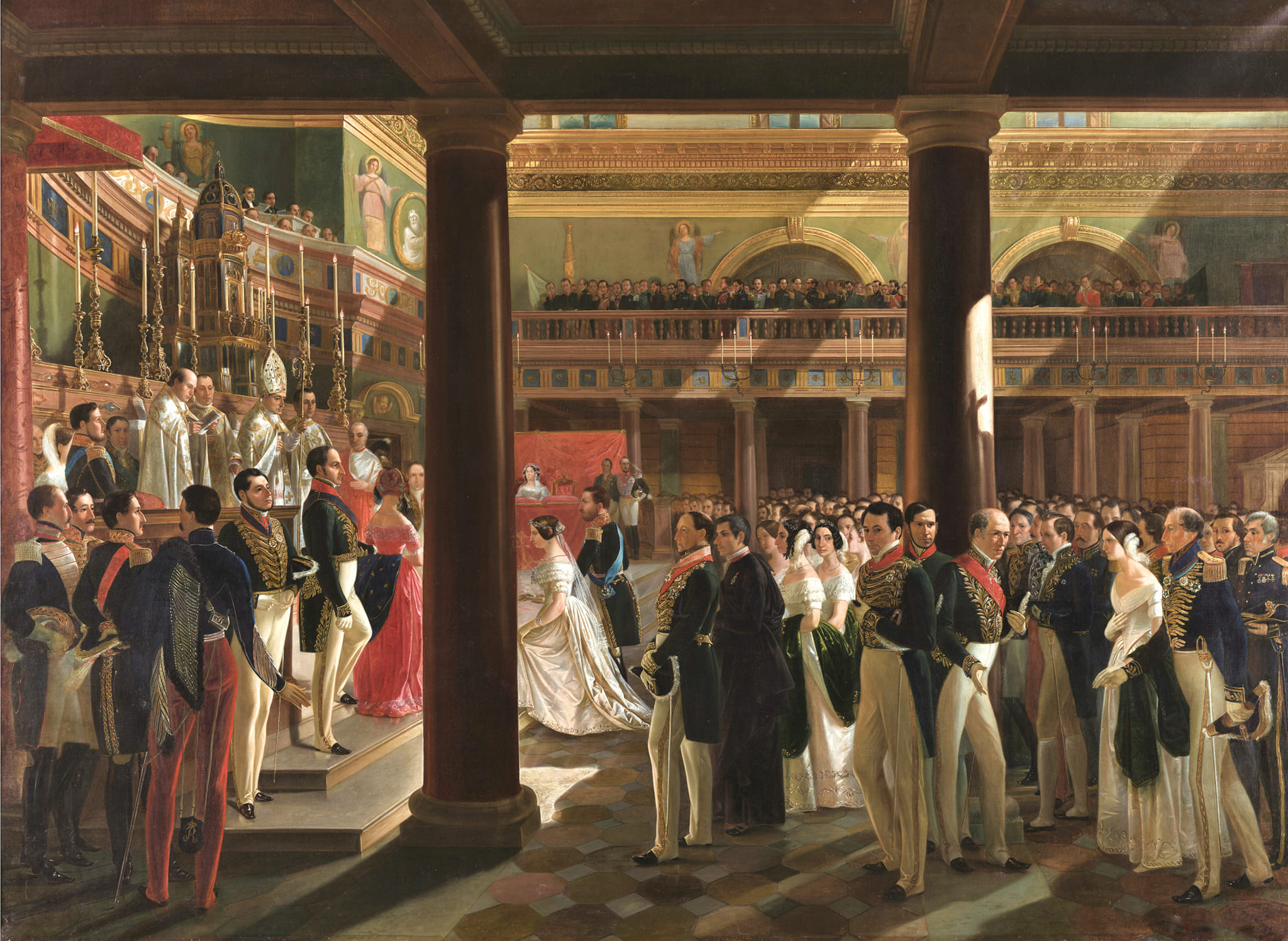
The wedding by proxy of Teresa Cristina to Pedro II, 1846

Upon learning that the young emperor of Brazil, Dom Pedro II, sought a wife, the government of the Two Sicilies offered the hand of Teresa Cristina. It also sent Pedro II a painting that greatly embellished the princess, which prompted him to accept the proposal. A proxy wedding was held on 30 May 1843 in Naples, Pedro II being represented by his fiancée's brother Prince Leopold, Count of Syracuse. A small Brazilian fleet composed of a frigate and two corvettes departed for the Two Sicilies on 3 March 1843 to escort the new Empress of Brazil. She arrived on Rio de Janeiro on 3 September 1843. Pedro II immediately rushed to board the ship and greet his bride. Upon seeing this impetuous gesture, the crowds cheered and guns fired deafening salutes. Teresa Cristina fell in love with her new husband at first sight.

The 17-year-old Pedro II was, for his part, clearly and greatly disappointed. His first impressions were only of her physical flaws—and of how much her appearance differed from the portrait which had been sent to him. Physically, she had dark brown hair and brown eyes, was short, slightly overweight, walked with a pronounced limp and, while not ugly, neither was she pretty. According to historian Pedro Calmon, Teresa Cristina had no true limp, but her odd way of walking was instead the result of bowed legs causing her to lean alternately right and left as she walked. Pedro II's high expectations were crushed, and he allowed his feelings of revulsion and rejection to show. After a short interval, he left the ship. Perceiving his disillusionment, she burst into tears, lamenting that "the emperor did not like me!" Although a proxy marriage had already been performed, an extravagant state wedding was held on 4 September at the Imperial Chapel in Rio de Janeiro.

Although the marriage had been strained from the beginning, Teresa Cristina continued striving to be a good wife. Her constancy toward fulfilling her duty, along with the birth of children, softened Pedro II's attitude. The two discovered shared interests, and their concern for and delight in their children created a sense of family happiness. That they were sexually active and compatible is witnessed by the series of pregnancies which ensued. After the birth of their first son in February 1845, the Empress bore children in July 1846, July 1847, and July 1848—named Afonso, Isabel, Leopoldina and Pedro, respectively.

== Empress consort of Brazil ==
=== Domestic life ===
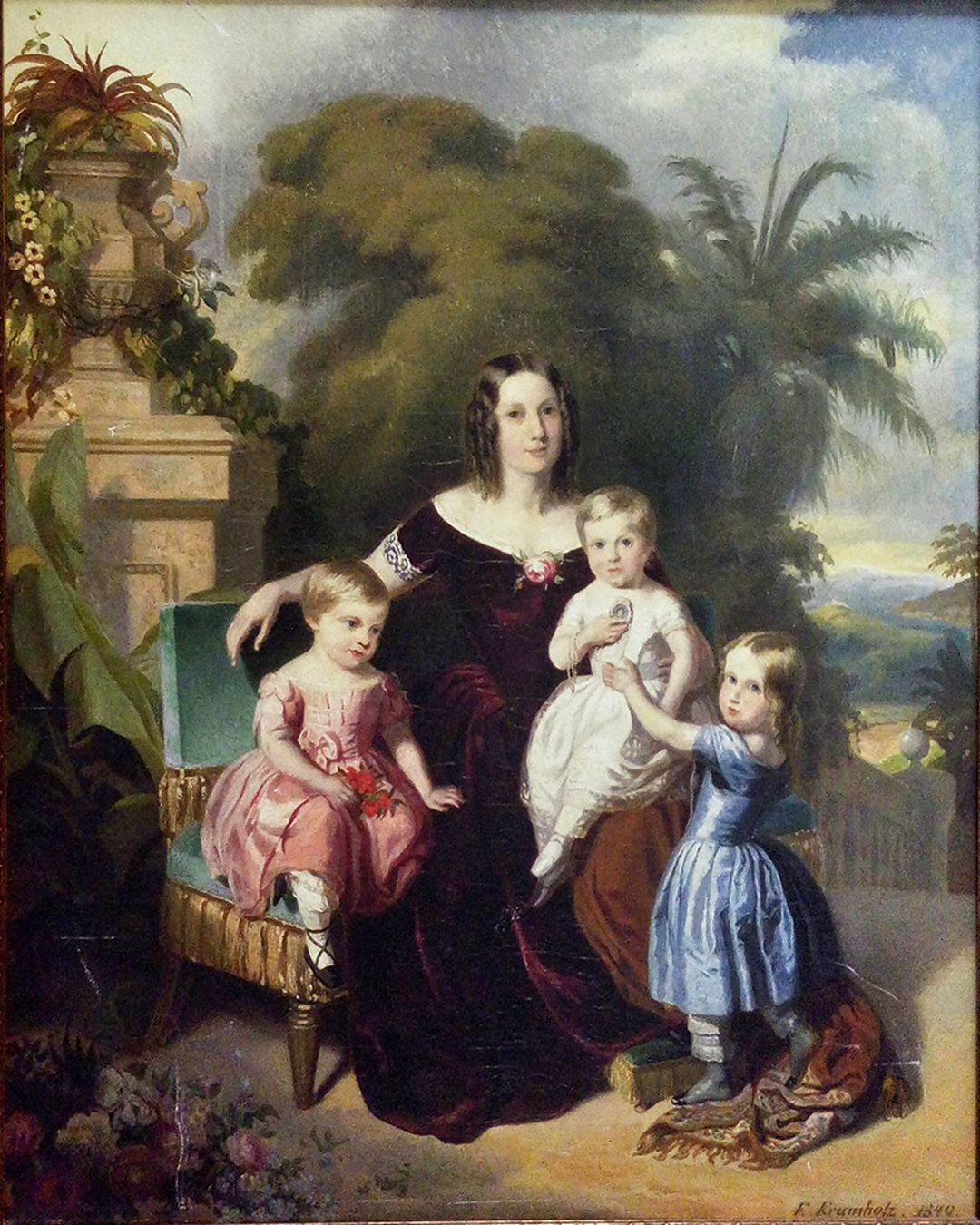
Teresa Cristina, around age 27, with her children, c. 1849

Teresa Cristina had grown to be a vital part of Pedro II's family life and routine. She never filled the roles of romantic lover or intellectual partner, however. Her devotion to the Emperor remained firm, though she feared being supplanted. She continued to appear with the Emperor in public, and he continued to treat her with respect and consideration. She was not rejected or slighted, but the relationship had changed. Pedro II treated her more as a close friend and companion than as a wife.

The long-held view is that the Empress accepted the circumscribed role in which she found herself, and that her life, duty and purpose were tied to her position as the Emperor's wife. However, her personal letters reveal that she could be strongheaded, sometimes at odds with her husband, and had a life of her own—albeit somewhat restricted. In a letter written on 2 May 1845 she stated: "I wait for the moment when we will meet, good Pedro, and seek forgiveness for all that I did to you during these days." In another letter of 24 January 1851, she acknowledged her difficult temperament: "I am not irritated at you [Pedro II] and you should forgive me because this is my character."

Her friendships were limited to her ladies-in-waiting, and in particular Dona Josefina da Fonseca Costa. She was well liked by her attendants, a good judge of the character of visitors and courtiers, unpretentious, generous, kindly and an affectionate mother and grandmother. She dressed and acted modestly, only wearing jewelry for occasions of state, and gave the impression of being somewhat sad. She had no interest in politics and occupied her time writing letters, reading, doing needlework, and attending to religious obligations and charitable projects. She possessed a beautiful voice, and often practiced her singing skills. Her appreciation for music also meant that she enjoyed opera and balls.

Teresa Cristina did not lack intellectual interests, and she had developed passions for the arts, music and—in particular—archaeology. The Empress began assembling a collection of archaeological artifacts from her earliest days in Brazil, and she exchanged hundreds of others with her brother, King Don Ferdinando II (Ferdinand II). She also sponsored archaeological studies in Italy and many of the artifacts—dated from the Etruscan civilization and the Ancient Roman period—found were brought to Brazil. The Empress also aided in recruiting Italian physicians, engineers, professors, pharmacists, nurses, artists, artisans and qualified workers with the goal of improving public education and public health in Brazil.

=== Rivalry with the Countess of Barral ===
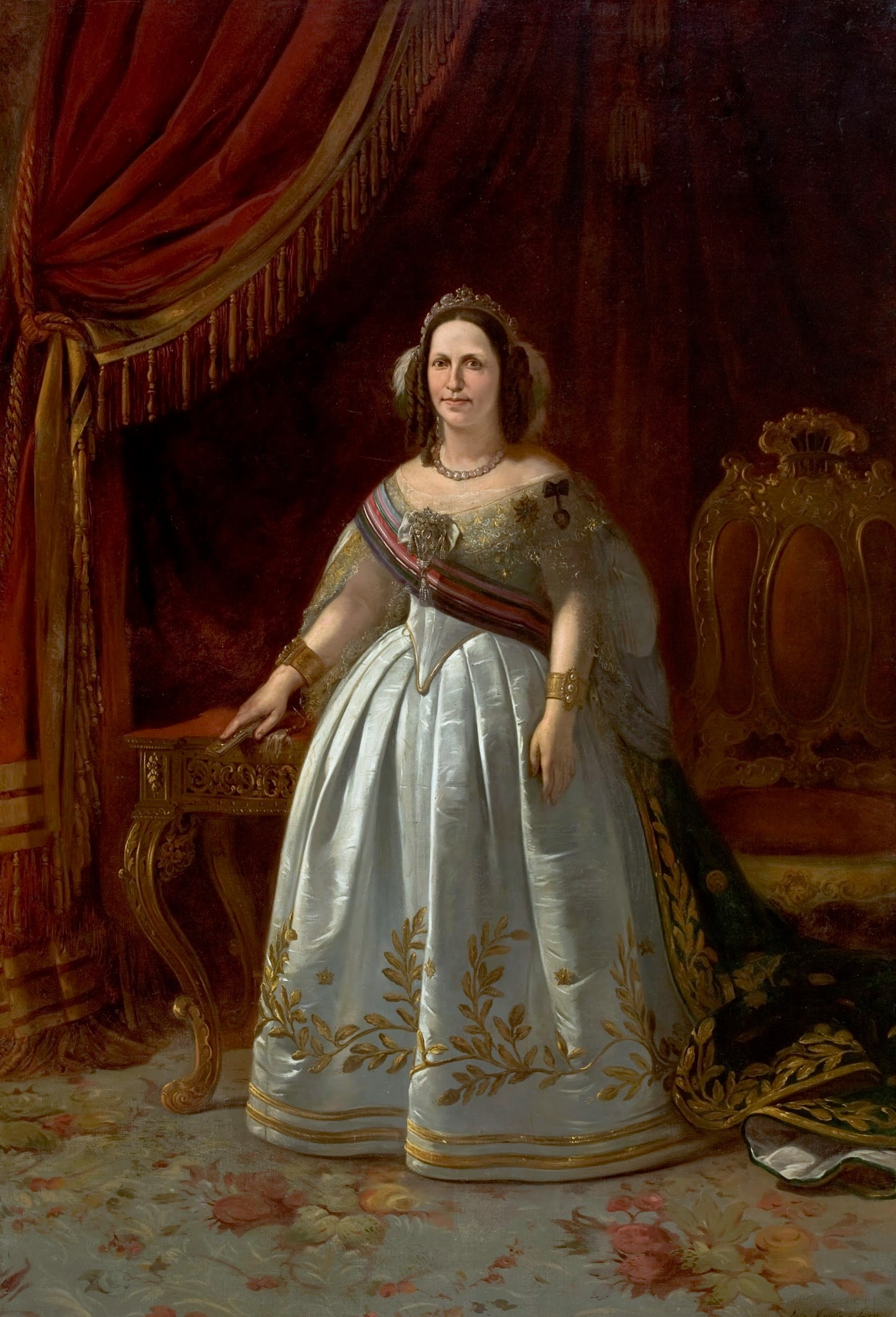
Portrait of Empress Teresa Cristina in court dress, painted by Victor Meirelles, c. 1864

The relationship between Teresa Cristina and Pedro II never became passionately romantic. However, a bond based upon family, mutual respect and fondness did develop. The Empress was a dutiful spouse and unfailingly supported the Emperor's positions. She was silent on the subject of his relationships with other women, suspected or otherwise. In turn, she was treated with utmost respect and there was no question of her position ever being threatened or called into question. No more children were born after July 1848, even after the death of her two sons in infancy. A likely reason for the halt to childbearing is that the Emperor became more attracted to other women who possessed beauty, wit and intelligence which the Empress could not provide.

Teresa Cristina found ignoring her husband's secret infidelities—hidden from the public, though not always from the Empress—more difficult after Pedro II named an aia (governess) for their daughters on 9 November 1856. The person chosen was Luísa de Barros, Countess of Barral, the Brazilian-born wife of a French nobleman. Barral possessed all the traits that Pedro II most admired in a woman: she was charming, vivacious, elegant, sophisticated, educated and confident. Charged with the education and upbringing of the young princesses, Barral soon captured the hearts of both Pedro II and his eldest daughter, Isabel. Leopoldina was not won over and disliked the Countess. Although Barral "may not have escaped Pedro II's embraces", she "certainly avoided his bed."

Nonetheless, the Emperor's infatuation with the Countess sometimes put Teresa Cristina in an awkward position, as when her younger daughter Leopoldina naively asked her why Pedro II kept nudging Barral's foot during their class. The Countess's increasing intimacy with her husband and daughter was painful and vexing to Teresa Cristina. Although she feigned ignorance of the situation, it did not pass unnoticed. She wrote in her diary that Barral "wished to make me tell her that I did not like her, but I did not say either yes or no." Historian Tobias Monteiro wrote that the Empress "could not disguise that she detested Barral."

== Later years ==
=== End of the Empire and banishment ===
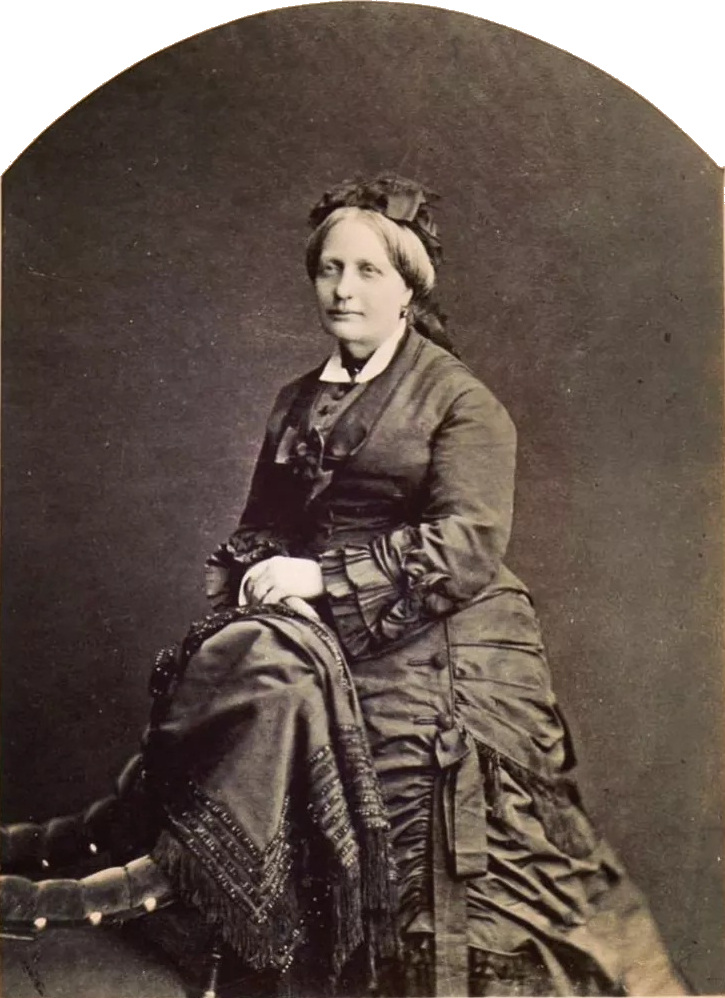
Teresa Cristina at age 55, 29 March 1877

The death of her daughter Leopoldina of typhoid fever on 7 February 1871 devastated the small Imperial Family. Pedro II decided on a trip to Europe that same year to "cheer up" his wife among other reasons (as stated in his own words) and to pay a visit to Leopoldina's four small boys, who had lived in Coburg with their parents since the late 1860s. The Imperial couple would travel abroad again during 1876 and 1887. Teresa Cristina preferred her ordinary life in Brazil, "dedicating herself to her family, religious devotions, and charitable works." In fact, visiting her native land only served to resurrect painful memories. Her family had been dethroned in 1861 and the Kingdom of the Two Sicilies had been annexed to what would later become the unified Kingdom of Italy. Everyone she had known from her youth was gone. As she wrote in 1872: "I do not know how to tell what was the impression I had upon seeing again, after 28 years, my fatherland and not to find anyone for whom I cared."

The Empress remained strong-willed even after years of marriage. Pedro II revealed in a letter written to the Countess of Barral in early 1881 that: "The [container] with the earrings which you mentioned, has been the cause for much recrimination on the part of someone [Teresa Cristina] who thinks that I have been to blame for their disappearance." Her son-in-law, Prince Gaston, Count of Eu, wrote a letter recounting how she had accidentally broken her arm in October 1885: "On Monday 26 when crossing the library on the way to dinner with the emperor who as usual preceded her by a few steps (and with whom, I infer from what she told us, she was arguing as she sometimes does), she caught her foot in a file under a table and fell down flat face forward." Nonetheless, she continued to express undiminished love for her husband.

The tranquil domestic routine ended when an Army faction rebelled and deposed Pedro II on 15 November 1889, ordering the entire Imperial Family to leave Brazil. Upon hearing the order to depart, an officer told the Empress: "Resignation, my lady." She replied to him: "I have it always, but how not to weep having to leave this land forever!" According to historian Roderick J. Barman, the "events of November 15, 1889, broke her emotionally and physically." The Empress "loved Brazil and its inhabitants. She desired nothing more than to end her days there. Aged 66 and plagued by both cardiac asthma and arthritis, she now faced the prospect of accompanying her husband in unceasing movement across the face of Europe, spending her last years virtually alone in alien and uncomfortable lodgings." Having been ill during almost the entire voyage across the Atlantic, Teresa Cristina and her family arrived in Lisbon, Portugal, on 7 December.

=== Death ===
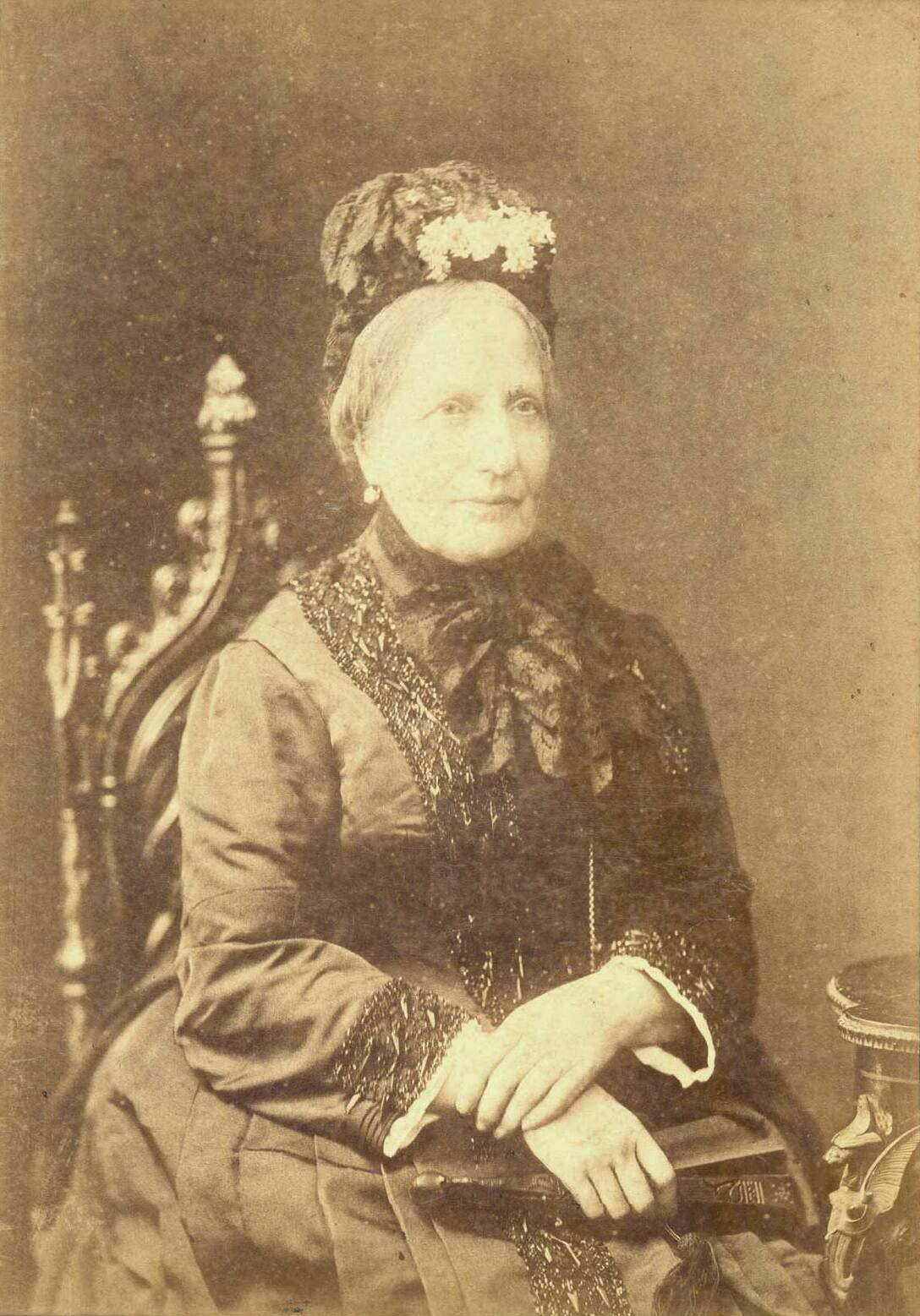
Teresa Cristina around age 65, c. 1887

From Lisbon the Imperial couple went on to Porto. Isabel and her family departed to Spain on a trip. On 24 December, the Imperial Family received official news that they had been banished forever from the country. Up until that point, they had only been requested to leave with no indication as to how long they were to stay away. The "news broke D. Teresa Cristina's will to live." Pedro II wrote in his journal on 28 December 1889: "Hearing the Empress complain I went to see what it was. She is cold with a pain in her sides; but she does not have any fever." As the day passed, Teresa Cristina's breathing became increasingly labored, and the failure of her respiratory system led to cardiac arrest and death at 2:00 pm.

As she lay dying, Teresa Cristina said to Maria Isabel de Andrade Pinto, Baroness of Japurá (sister-in-law of Joaquim Marques Lisboa, Marquis of Tamandaré): "Maria Isabel, I do not die of illness, I die of sorrow and of regret!" Her last words were: "I miss my daughter [Isabel] and my grandchildren. I can not embrace her for the last time. Brazil, beautiful land ... To there I can not return". The streets of Porto were crowded with people gathered to witness her funeral procession. By request of her husband, Teresa Cristina's body was carried to the Church of São Vicente de Fora near Lisbon, where it was interred in the Braganza Pantheon. Her remains, along with Pedro II's, were later repatriated to Brazil in 1921 with much fanfare and pomp. They were given a final resting place in the Cathedral of Petrópolis in 1939.

The news of her death produced sincere mourning in Brazil. The Brazilian poet and journalist Artur Azevedo wrote of the general view toward Teresa Cristina after her death: "I never spoke to her, but also never passed her without respectifuly removing my hat and bowing myself, not to the Empress, but to the sweet and honest figure of a poor, almost humble, bourgeoise. I saw many extremist republicans do the same." He continued: "They called her the mother of the Brazilians, and we all really attributed to her a kind of a filial veneration. That is the truth."

Newspapers in Brazil also reported her death. The Gazeta de Notícias (News Gazette) commented: "Who was this saintly lady, we do not need to repeat it. All Brazil knows that, in this blow which hurt the former Emperor profoundly, it is remembered that she was justly and universally proclaimed the mother of the Brazilians." The Jornal do Commercio (Commercial Journal) wrote: "For forty and six years Dona Teresa Cristina lived in the Brazilian fatherland which she sincerely loved, and during that long time never, anywhere in this vast country, was her name pronounced except in praise and words of regard." It concluded: "Next to her husband, who was for a long time the head of the Brazilian nation, her influence was known to be felt only for the good."

=== Legacy ===
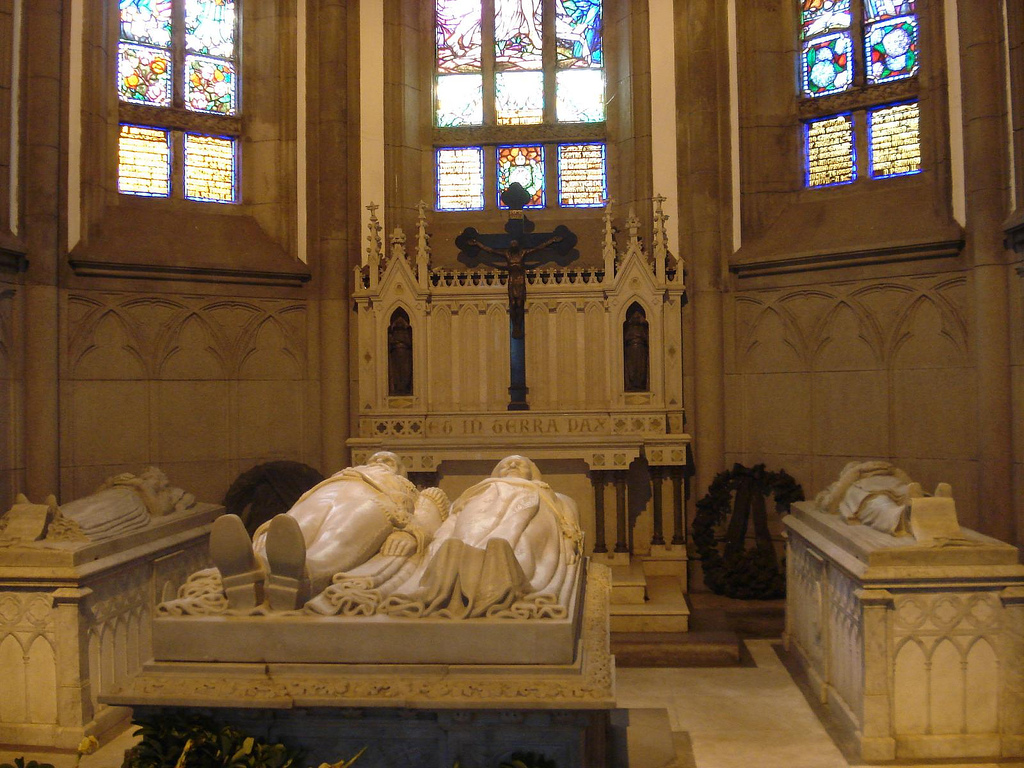
Tomb of Teresa Cristina and Pedro II inside the Cathedral of Petrópolis, Brazil

Teresa Cristina has been given a less than prominent place in Brazil's history. Historian Aniello Angelo Avella said that the Empress, nicknamed "by her contemporaries as 'Mother of the Brazilians'," is "completely unknown in Italy and little studied in Brazil". According to his view, the few existing sources relegate her to having "lived in the shadow of her husband, dedicating herself to her daughters' education, to home affairs, to charity." The resulting image "is of a woman of limited culture, blank, silent, who compensated with kindness and virtues of the heart the lack of physical attributes." And this is the view that has come to be enshrined in history and the popular imagination, despite being not quite a true representation of Teresa Cristina, since she was a well learned and willful woman.

According to historian Eli Behar, Teresa Cristina became notable "for her discretion, which kept her far from being associated with any political movement; and for her tenderness and charity, which earned her the cognomen 'Mother of the Brazilians'." A similar opinion is voiced by Historian Benedito Antunes, who said that she "was beloved by Brazilians, who defined her, for her discretion, as the 'silent empress', and yet regarded her as 'the mother of the Brazilians'." He also praised the Empress for her sponsorship of cultural and scientific development: she "promoted culture in various ways, bringing from Italy artists, intellectuals, scientists, botanists, musicians, thus contributing to the progress and enrichment of the nation's cultural life." This view is shared by historian Eugenia Zerbini, who argued that, thanks to her, Brazil now has the largest classical archaeological collection in Latin America.

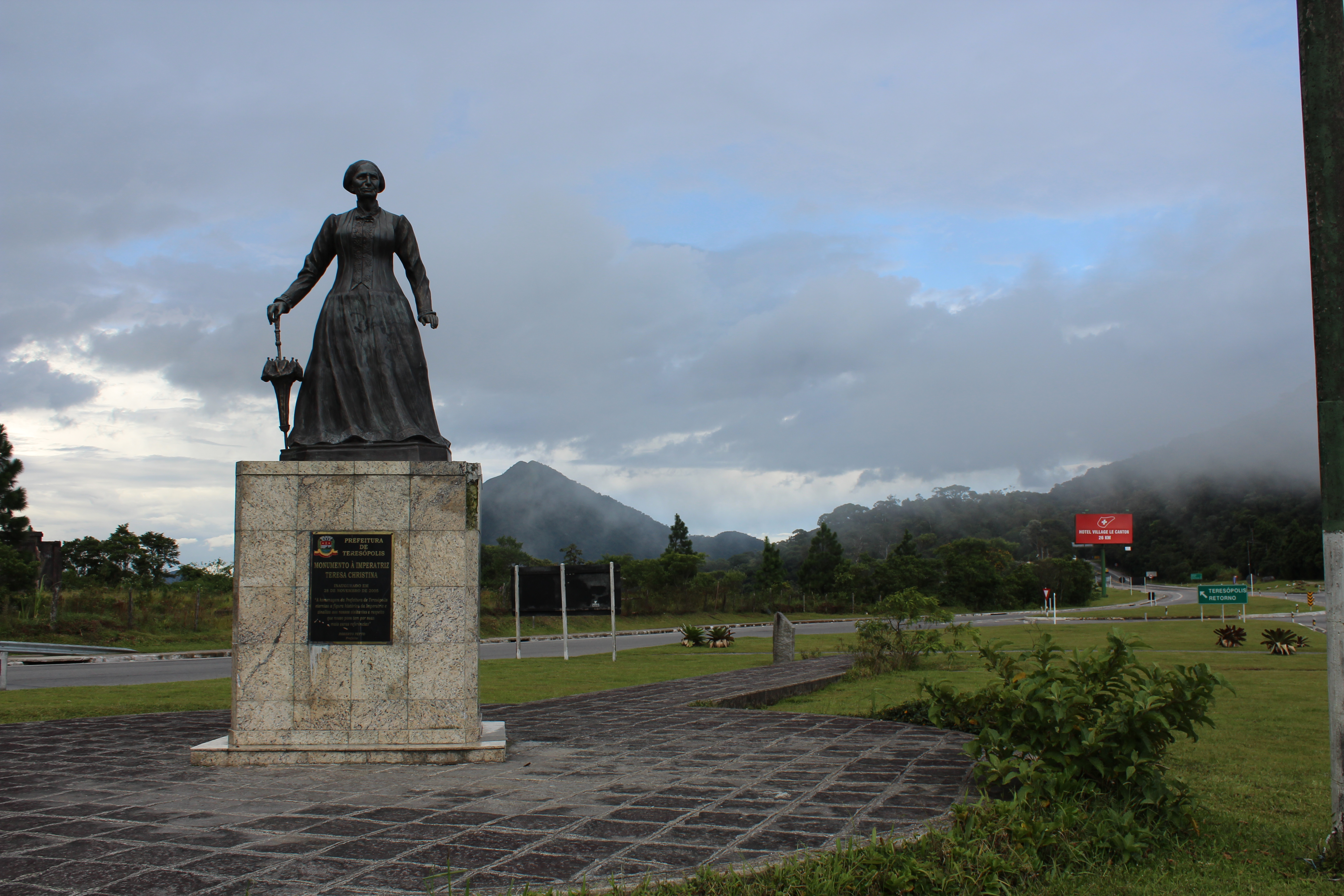
Statue of Teresa Cristina in Teresópolis, near Rio de Janeiro

Just prior to his own death, Pedro II donated most of his possessions to the Brazilian government, which were later divided between the Brazilian National Archives, the Imperial Museum of Brazil, the National Library of Brazil and the Brazilian Historic and Geographic Institute. Pedro II imposed only one condition: that the gift was to be named in honor of his late wife, and so it is known as the "Teresa Cristina Maria Collection". The collection is registered by UNESCO as part of the heritage of humanity in its Memory of the World Programme. Finally, Teresa Cristina is remembered in the names of several Brazilian cities, including Teresópolis (in Rio de Janeiro), Teresina (capital of Piauí), Cristina (in Minas Gerais) and Imperatriz (in Maranhão).

== Titles and honors ==
Styles of Empress Teresa Cristina of Brazil
- Reference style: Her Imperial Majesty
- Spoken style: Your Imperial Majesty
- Alternative style: Madam

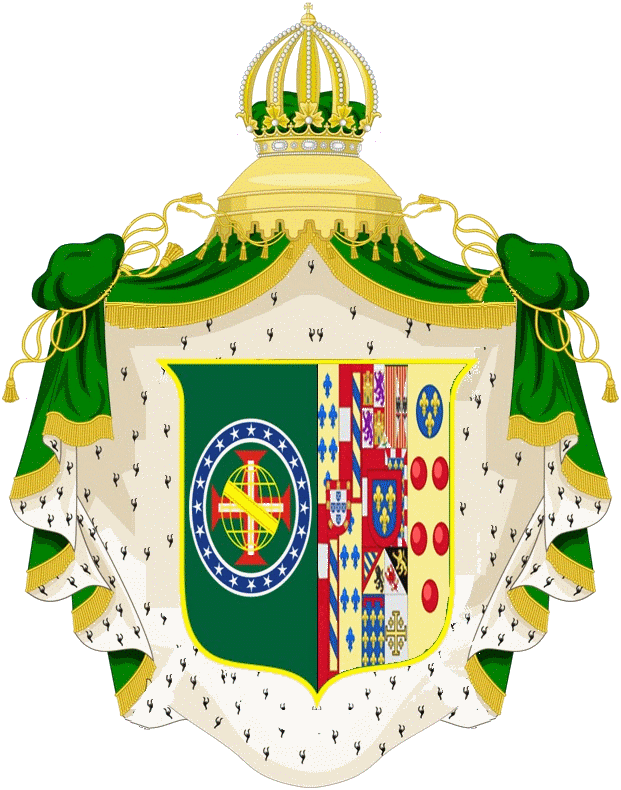
Coat of arms of Teresa Cristina of the Two Sicilies as Empress of Brazil

=== Titles and styles ===
- 14 March 1822 – 30 May 1843: Her Royal Highness Princess Teresa Cristina of the Two Sicilies
- 30 May 1843 – 15 November 1889: Her Imperial Majesty The Empress of Brazil

The Empress's full style and title were "Her Imperial Majesty Dona Teresa Cristina, Empress of Brazil".

=== Foreign honors ===
- Band of the Spanish Order of Queen Maria Luisa.
- Band of the Portuguese Order of Saint Isabel.
- Insignia of the Austrian Order of the Starry Cross.
- Insignia of the Bavarian Order of Saint Elizabeth.
- Grand Cross of the Order of the Holy Sepulchre.
- Grand Dame of Honour and Devotion of the Order of Malta.
- Grand Cross of the Mexican Imperial Order of St. Charles.

== Genealogy ==
=== Ancestry ===
Ancestors of Teresa Cristina of the Two Sicilies

8. Charles III of Spain
4. Ferdinand I of the Two Sicilies
9. Maria Amalia of Saxony
2. Francis I of the Two Sicilies
10. Francis I, Holy Roman Emperor
5. Maria Carolina of Austria
11. Maria Theresa of Austria
1. Teresa Cristina of the Two Sicilies
12. Charles III of Spain (= 8)
6. Charles IV of Spain
13. Maria Amalia of Saxony (= 9)
3. Maria Isabella of Spain
14. Philip, Duke of Parma
7. Maria Luisa of Parma
15. Louise-Élisabeth of France

=== Issue ===
Name	Portrait	Lifespan	Notes
By Pedro II of Brazil (2 December 1825 – 5 December 1891; married by proxy on 30 May 1843)
Afonso, Prince Imperial of Brazil	Oil portrait of the Prince Imperial as a blond-haired child in a white frock with lace at the neck and official blue sash	23 February 1845 – 11 June 1847	Prince Imperial of Brazil from birth to his death.
Isabel, Princess Imperial of Brazil	Three-quarters profile photographic portrait of a young lady with light-colored hair elaborately curled and wearing a high-necked, dark Victorian era velvet dress with dark buttons	29 July 1846 – 14 November 1921	Princess Imperial of Brazil and Countess of Eu due to her marriage to Gaston d'Orléans. She had four children from this marriage. She also acted as Regent of the Empire while her father was traveling abroad.
Princess Leopoldina of Brazil	Photographic portrait of a young lady with light-colored hair swept back and wearing a high-necked, Victorian era striped dress, dark earrings and a dark locket suspended around her neck on a ribbon	13 July 1847 – 7 February 1871	Married Prince Ludwig August of Saxe-Coburg and Gotha with four sons resulting from this marriage.
Pedro, Prince Imperial of Brazil		19 July 1848 – 9 January 1850	Prince Imperial of Brazil from birth to his death.

== Footnotes ==
Teresa Cristina of the Two Sicilies House of Bourbon-Two Sicilies Cadet branch of the House of Bourbon Born: 14 March 1822 Died: 28 December 1889
Brazilian royalty
Vacant Title last held by Amélie of Leuchtenberg	Empress consort of Brazil; 30 May 1843 – 15 November 1889	Monarchy abolished
Titles in pretence
Republic declared	— TITULAR — Imperial consort of Brazil; 15 November 1889 – 28 December 1889	Vacant Title next held by Gaston, Count of Eu
