= Luísa Margarida de Barros Portugal, Countess of Barral =

Luísa Margarida
- Countess of Barral; Marquise of Montferrat
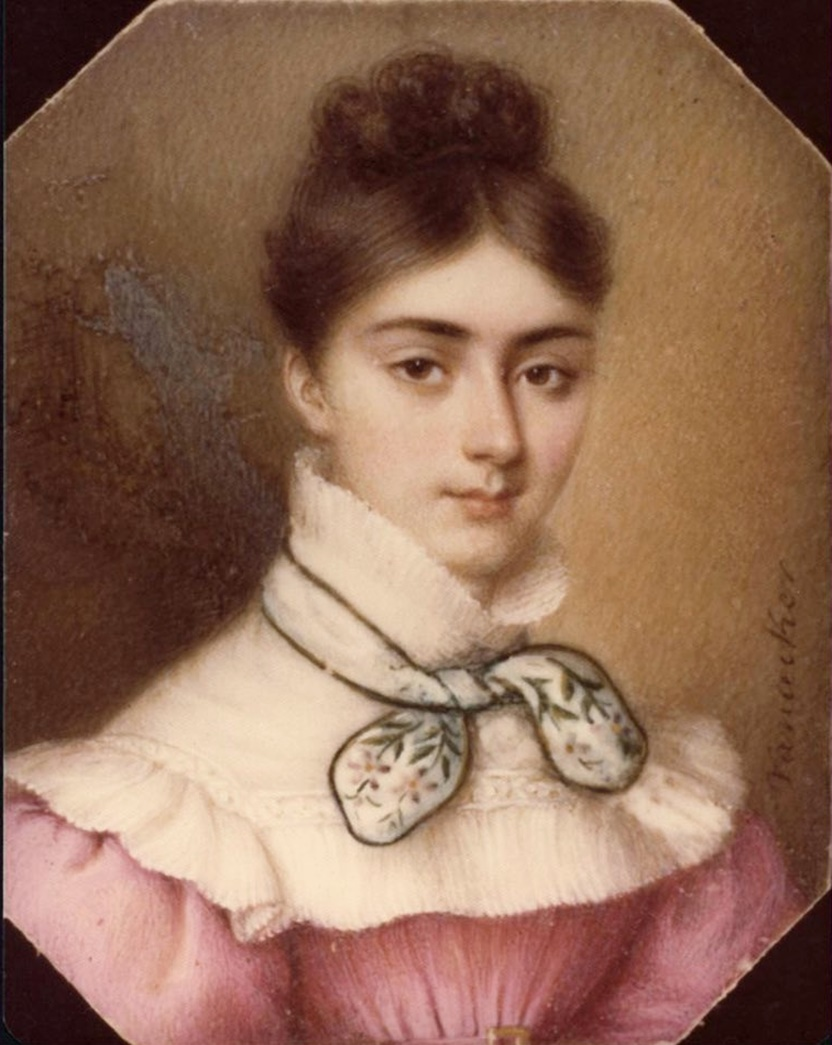
- A young Countess of Barral
- Born: 13 April 1816; Santo Amaro da Purificação, Bahia, United Kingdom of Portugal, Brazil and the Algarves
- Died: 14 January 1891 (aged 74); Paris, Île-de-France, French Third Republic
- Spouse: Eugène de Barral, Count of Barral, 4th Marquess of Montferrat
- Issue: Horace Dominique
Names
- Luísa Margarida de Barros Portugal
- Father: Domingos Borges de Barros
- Mother: Maria do Carmo Gouveia Portugal

Luísa Margarida de Barros Portugal (13 April 1816 – January 1891), later Countess of Barral, was a Brazilian noblewoman and courtier, preceptor of Brazilian princesses Isabel and Leopoldina, rumored to be the major love interest of Pedro II of Brazil and later part of Louis Philippe I of France's court.

== Life ==
=== Early life ===
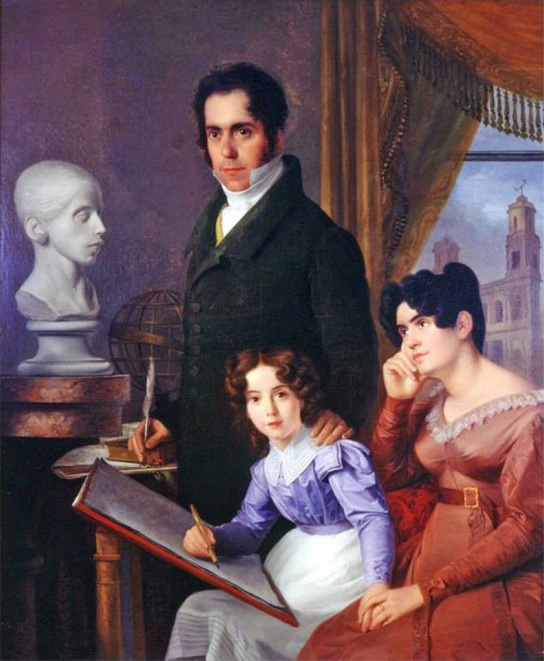
Luísa and her parents.

She was the daughter of the Brazilian diplomat and nobleman Domingos Borges de Barros, the Viscount of Pedra Branca, statesman of the first reign of , and his wife Maria do Carmo Gouveia Portugal, descendant of traditional families of New Christians of Bahia and the last rabbi of Spain before inquisition, Dom Abraham Senior, according to genealogist Francisco Antonio Doria, in the book "Herdeiros do Poder" and the work "The Occult Rabbi - the saga of a family by Jewish origin - by Carmen Nogueira".

She spent her upbringing divided between France and Brazil.

Luísa then married Eugène de Barral, Count of Barral, distant relative of Alexandre de Beauharnais, Viscount de Beauharnais, first husband of Joséphine de Beauharnais, the famous wife of Napoleon Bonaparte. This made him a 5th cousin of the Empress of Brazil the second wife of Pedro I of Brazil, the Empress Amélie of Leuchtenberg, and went to live in the court of the king Louis Philippe I. They had a son, Horace Dominique, who would contract marriage with Maria Francisca de Paranaguá, daughter of the 2nd Marquis of Paranaguá.

=== Life at court ===
With her marriage, she became a friend and lady-in-waiting of princess Francisca of Braganza, the Princess of Joinville, sister of Pedro II of Brazil. When the emperor's stepmother, Amélie of Leuchtenberg, refused the task of being governess to her two daughters, Francisca appointed Luísa Margarida de Barros Portugal to the emperor.

After much negotiation and certification of her powers, Luísa accepted the post. Momentarily estranged from her husband, Eugène, and accompanied by her son, she moved to Rio de Janeiro.

The countess took up residence in a rented house, since, having a family, she could not be content with an apartment in imperial palace. She was also named lady-in-waiting to Teresa Cristina in September 1855, although the real companion of the empress was Josefina da Fonseca Costa.

Luísa Margarida immediately set about establishing her authority in the palace, a place where power was hotly contested, and for that reason caused the fury of many of the more self-serving officials. She had an exuberant personality, assertive air, intelligence and, at the same time, contradictory Catholic mentality, as well as physical beauty. Endowed with solid culture and friendly to intellectuals and celebrities of the time, such as Franz Liszt and Count of Gobineau, the countess served as an intermediary between the emperor and many intellectuals, with whom D Pedro II exchanged extensive correspondence.

Emperor Pedro II was attracted to types similar to that of his stepmother Amélie. The countess thus became a close friend of the emperor and, according to most contemporary historians, his mistress. Immediately, a conflict arose between the Empress Teresa Cristina and the Countess of Barral. However, it soon became clear that the Countess would try to rival the Empress and there is no conclusive evidence that she consummated her affair with the Emperor. The few remaining correspondences between them lead to doubt whether their relationship was not purely platonic. After all, despite being modern and liberal, Luísa Margarida appeared to be a strict Catholic.

=== Last years ===
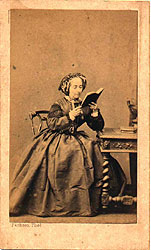
The countess already in old age.

The relationship, a colorful friendship along the lines of those that existed in France during the romantic period, would last until the year of their death. For a long period, it remained only through epistolary. The Emperor met his friend on the two trips he undertook to Europe, in 1870 and 1887, and in the last months of his life, when, a widower and exiled, he spent some time at the Countess's residence in Cannes.

D.Pedro II would also have had romances with other women, such as the Countess of Villeneuve, Madame de La Tour and Eponina Octaviano. The first two were personal friends of hers and would have been introduced to the emperor as a way of "entertaining" their lover. The countess of Barral would die a few months before the emperor.

=== The letters ===
In the 1940s, the Count of Barral, his grandson, donated to the Imperial Museum of Petrópolis the letters exchanged between his grandmother and the Emperor of Brazil, which show the relationship between them. The agreement between the countess and the emperor said that both should burn letters received from each other immediately after they were read. Although D. Pedro II followed the rules, Luísa Margarida disobeyed them sporadically and kept some letters. Thus, the only surviving letters were received by the Countess, but none sent by her to the Emperor.

== Gallery ==
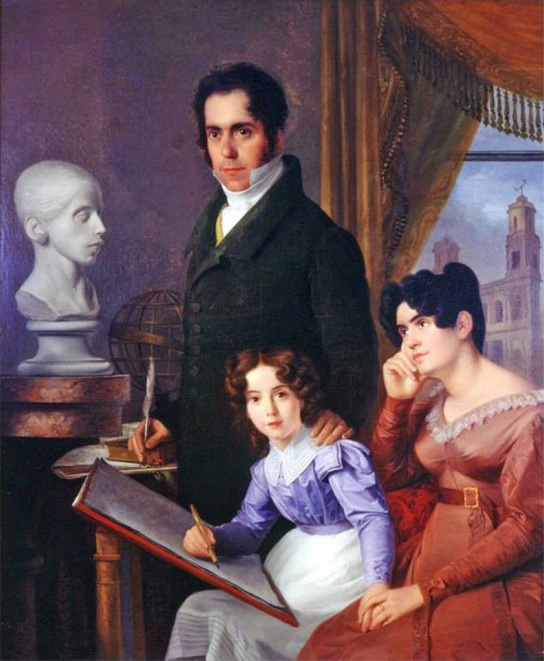

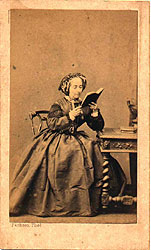

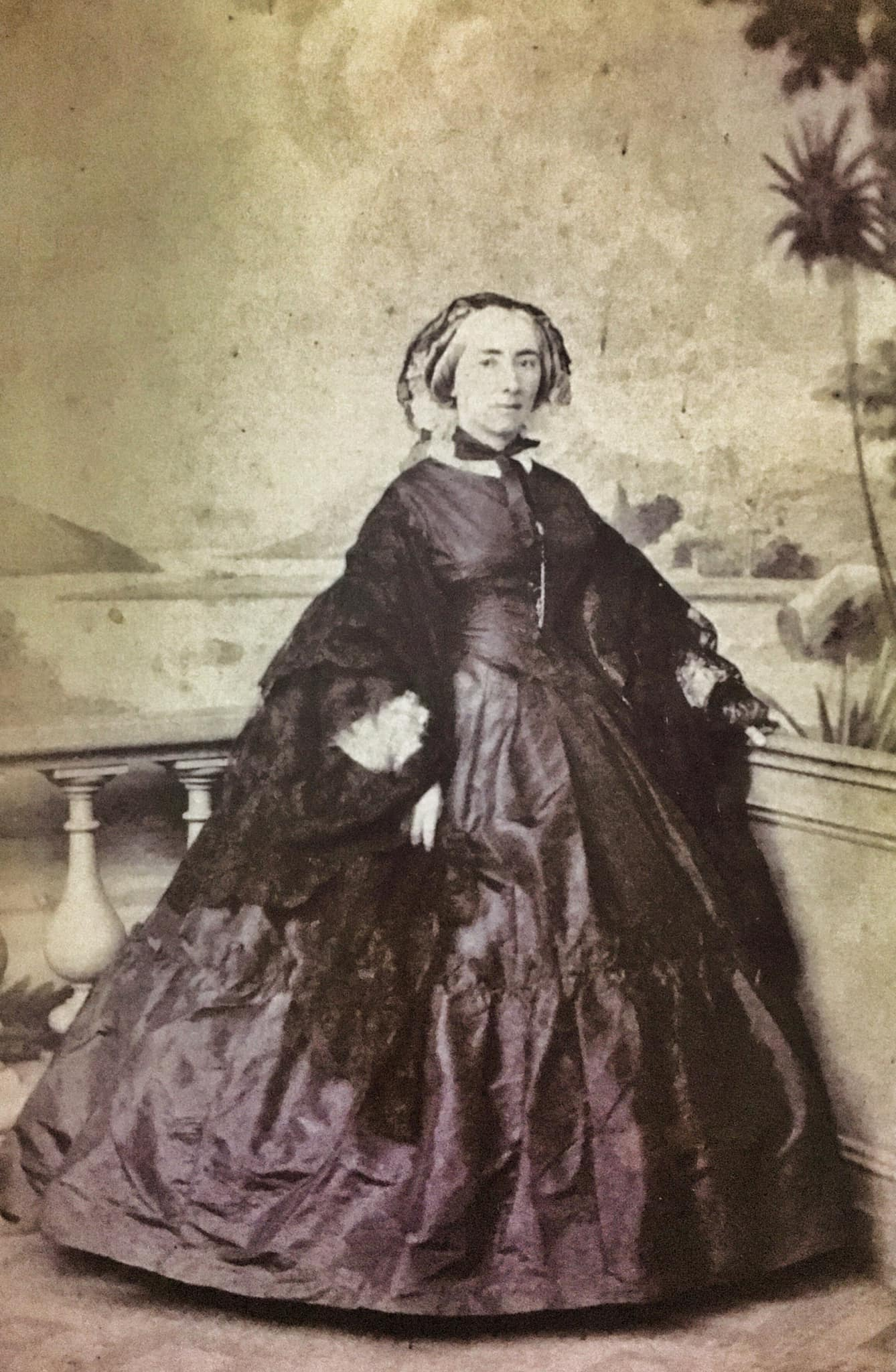
