= Saxe-Coburg and Braganza branch =

Brazilian imperial house

Saxe-Coburg and Braganza branch Ramo de Saxe-Coburgo e Bragança Haus Sachsen-Coburg und Braganza
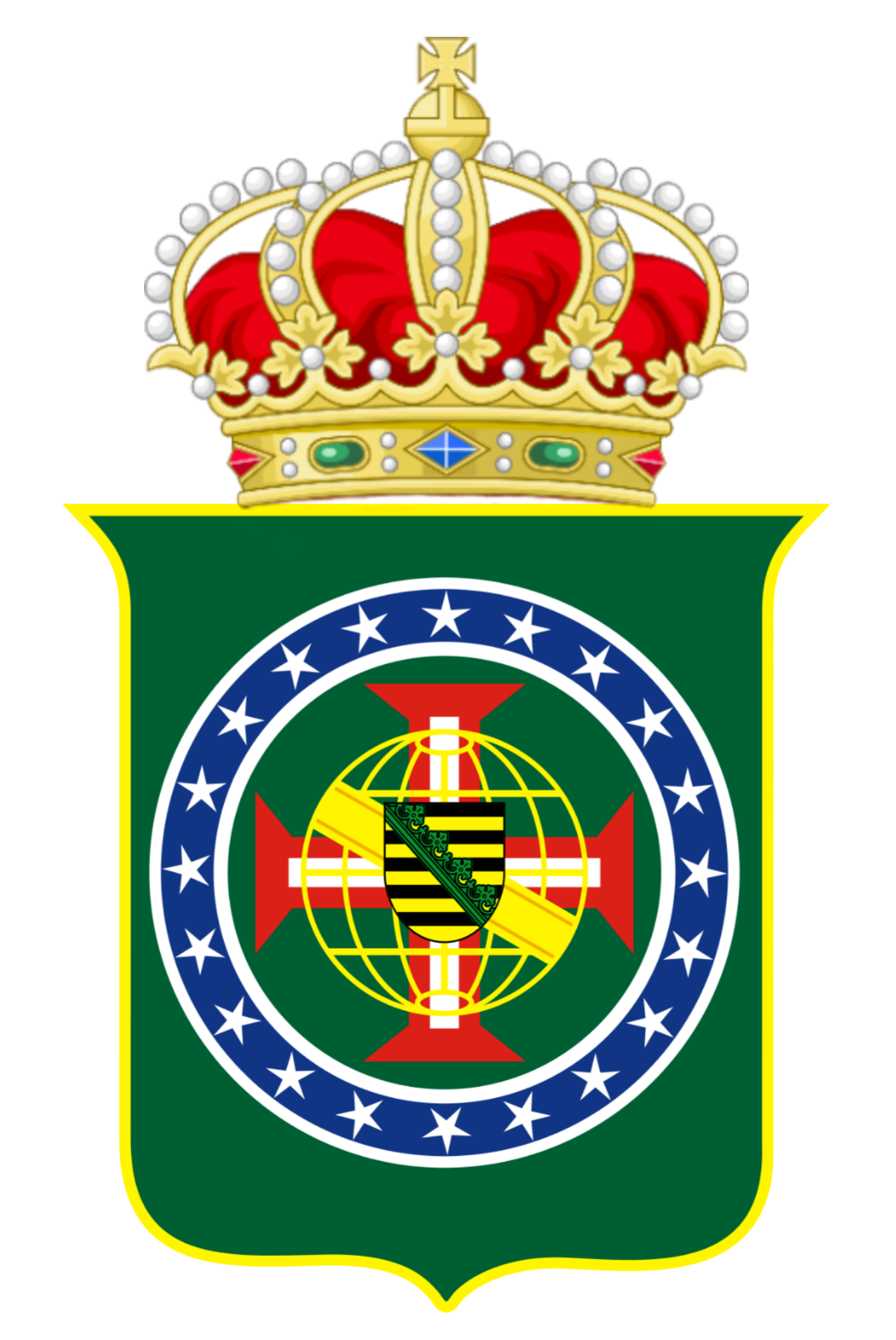
- Parent house: House of Saxe-Coburg and Gotha-Koháry; Brazilian imperial family (House of Braganza)
- Country: Austrian Empire; Empire of Brazil
- Founded: 1864; 162 years ago
- Founder: Princess Leopoldina of Brazil and Prince Ludwig August of Saxe-Coburg and Gotha
- Current head: Carlos Tasso of Saxe-Coburgo and Braganza
- Titles: Prince of Brazil; Prince of Saxe-Coburg and Gotha; Duke of Saxony
- Estate: Brazil

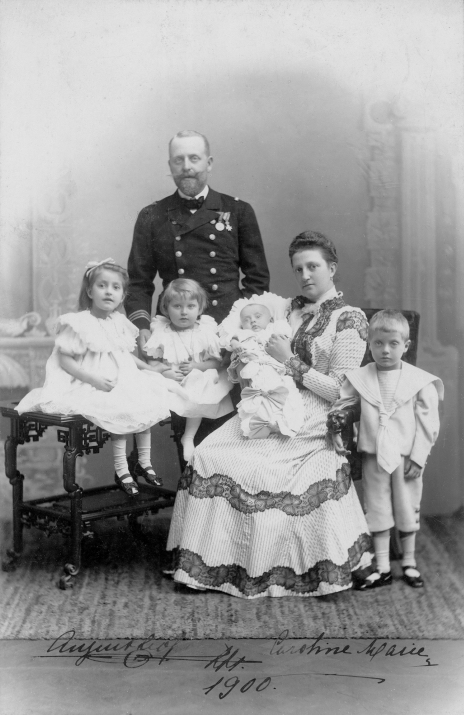
Saxe-Coburg and Braganza family in 1900

The Saxe-Coburg and Bragança Branch (Portuguese: Ramo de Saxe-Coburgo e Bragança, German: Haus Sachsen-Coburg und Braganza) is a cadet branch of the Imperial House of Brazil and of the House of Saxe-Coburg and Gotha-Koháry, itself a branch of the House of Saxe-Coburg and Gotha. The house was founded with the marriage of Princess Leopoldina of Brazil to Prince Ludwig August of Saxe-Coburg and Gotha in 1864. Two of the first four princes of the house were recognized as Princes of Brazil due to the apparent infertility of the Princess Imperial, their aunt, which placed them as heirs presumptive to the throne and made their offspring a junior branch of the Imperial House of Brazil, behind the senior branch which is the House of Orléans-Braganza.

== History ==
The branch originated with the wedding of the princess Leopoldina of Brazil, daughter of Pedro II of Brazil with the prince Ludwig August of Saxe-Coburg and Gotha, celebrated on 15 December 1864. A Brazil with the lineage of Saxe-Coburg and Gotha was part of the diplomatic strategy of the Duchess of Kent to gain the British Empire political influence in Brazil. From this union four children were born; however, only the two oldest, Peter August and August Leopold, remained with Brazilian nationality. Peter August had no descendants and passed the headship of the branch to the descendants of his brother, who had already died when Peter August died.

August Leopold, exiled in Vienna, Austro-Hungarian Empire, married in 1894 the Archduchess Karoline Marie of Austria, granddaughter of the Grand Duke Leopold II of Tuscany. From this union, eight children were born, of which Princess Teresa Cristina (born in 1902) was the only one who remained with Brazilian nationality, as well as her children.

Teresa Cristina married in Salzburg; the Baron Lamoral Taxis of Bordogna and Valnigra, based in Italy, and who belonged to the princely family of Thurn and Taxis. The baron allowed his children to be registered as Brazilians, so that they could remain in the line of succession of the Brazilian Braganzas. This couple left as heir of their names and traditions Carlos Tasso of Saxe-Coburg and Braganza.

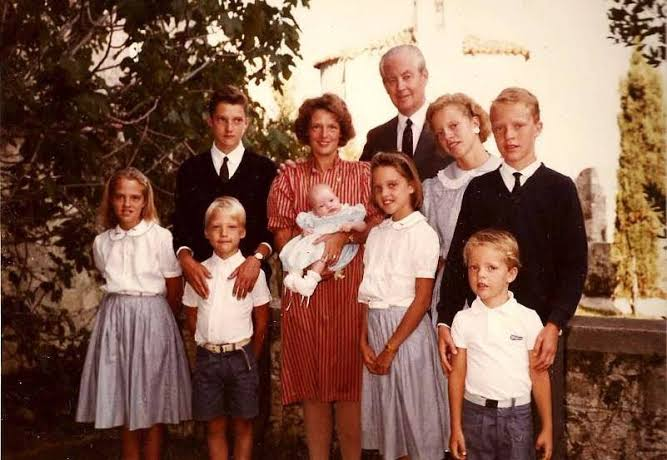
Saxe-Coburg and Braganza family in 1985

The members of this branch would not normally be eligible for the dignity of Dom; since titles of nobility is not transmitted through the mother by the nobility rules of Brazil given that their claim to that dignity came from Princess Leopoldina.

However, after the death of Princess Leopoldina, her first two sons; Peter Augusto and August Leopold, were taken to Brazil to be raised as heirs to the Brazilian imperial throne, given the difficulty of their aunt Imperial Princess Isabel, to conceive children. Princes Pedro Augusto August and August Leopold began to receive the treatment of Highness and Dom, being for all intents and purposes, Princes of Brazil. However, this condition weakened with the birth of Pedro de Alcântara, first male of Princess Isabel and Count of Eu, and his brothers.

== Heads of the Saxe-Coburg and Braganza branch ==
1. Leopoldina of Brazil (1847–1871). Daughter of the Emperor Pedro II and the Empress Teresa Cristina.
2. Prince Peter August (1871–1934). Eldest son of Leopoldine and Prince Ludwig August.
3. Princess Teresa Cristina (1934–1990). Daughter of August Leopold and the Archduchess Karoline Marie of Austria-Tuscany.
4. Carlos Tasso of Saxe-Coburg and Braganza (1990–). Son of Teresa Cristina and Baron Lamoral Taxis de Bordogna and Valnigra.

== List of notable members ==
- Prince August Leopold
- Carlos Tasso of Saxe-Coburg and Braganza
- Princess Leopoldina of Brazil
- Prince Ludwig August
- Prince Philipp
- Prince Ludwig Gaston
- Prince Peter August
- Prince Joseph Ferdinand
- Prince Rainer Maria
- Princess Teresa Cristina
- Princess Maria Karoline

== See also ==
- Brazilian Imperial Family
- House of Saxe-Coburg and Gotha-Koháry
