= Prince Rainer of Saxe-Coburg and Gotha =

Prince Rainer
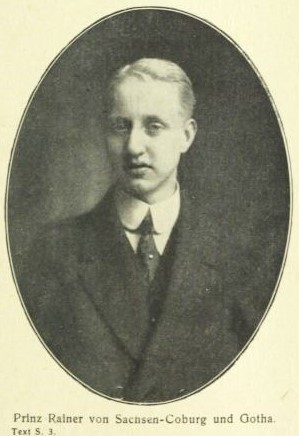
- Rainer in 1919

Head of the House of Saxe-Coburg and Gotha-Koháry
- Tenure: 6 July 1934 – 7 January 1945
- Predecessor: Prince Peter August
- Successor: Prince Johannes Heinrich
- Born: 4 May 1900; Pula, Austria-Hungary
- Died: after 7 January 1945 (aged 44); Budapest, Kingdom of Hungary
- Spouse: Johanna Károlyi de Károly-Patty et Vasvár (m. 1930; div. 1935) Edith de Kózol (m. 1940)
- Issue: Prince Johannes Heinrich
Names
- Rainer Maria Joseph Florian Ignatius Michael Gabriel Raphael Gonzaga
- House: Saxe-Coburg and Gotha-Koháry
- Father: Prince August Leopold of Saxe-Coburg and Gotha
- Mother: Archduchess Karoline Marie of Austria
- Religion: Roman Catholicism

Prince Rainer Maria Joseph Florian Ignatius Michael Gabriel Raphael Gonzaga of Saxe-Coburg and Gotha, in German: Rainer Maria Joseph Florian Ignatius Michael Gabriel Raphael Gonzaga, Prinz von Sachsen-Coburg und Gotha (4 May 1900, in Pola – after 7 January 1945). Cadet of a reigning German dynasty, Prince Rainer was the head of the House of Saxe-Coburg and Gotha-Koháry branch of the House of Wettin, heir in the female line of one of the oldest and wealthiest families of the Hungarian nobility.

He disappeared during the siege of Budapest, and was believed to have been kidnapped by Russians or killed by retreating German troops in 1945.

== Family ==
He was the second son of Prince August Leopold of Saxe-Coburg and Gotha and his wife Archduchess Karoline Marie of Austria. At the time of his birth the House of Wettin ruled the Kingdom of Saxony and the Ernestine duchies in Germany, as well as the kingdoms of Belgium, Portugal, Bulgaria and the United Kingdom.

The deaths of his older brother August (1908) and his father (1922), made him the fourth in the Roman Catholic line of Saxe-Coburg-Gotha princes to inherit the legacy of the House of Koháry.

He had four sisters and two younger brothers, Prince Philipp (married with issue) and Prince Ernst (married without issue).

== Significance ==
In addition to being in the line of succession to the Coburg throne, he possessed one of the largest fortunes in Hungary, one of the constituent realms within the Habsburg Empire, whose reign, however, he saw come to an end, along with that of the Dukes of Saxe-Coburg and Gotha, in 1918. Even after the fall of the German and Austro-Hungarian monarchies, he retained ownership of most of the vast Koháry domains, which continued to generate a princely income. He also owned the Csábrág and Szitnya castles, both in modern-day Slovakia, among other lands in Central Europe.

== Marriage and issue ==
In Munich on 15 December 1930 Prince Rainer married, firstly, Johanna Károlyi de Károly-Patty (17 September 1906 – 17 November 1992). They had one son:

1. Johann Heinrich Frederick Werner Konrad Rainer Maria, Prinz von Sachsen-Coburg und Gotha Koháry (Innsbruck 1931–2010).
  - He married firstly to Baroness Marie-Gabrielle von Fürstenberg (october 24, 1957 and dissolved in 1968).
    - Princess Felicitas (b. 1958), married Sergei Sergejewitsch Trotzky
  - And secondly to Princess Mathilde of Saxony (b.1936–d.2018) (1968 and divorced in 1993)
    - Prince Johannes, who was born in 1969, was killed in a climbing accident in 1987. The young prince had been named as heir to his maternal uncle, the Margrave of Meissen.

Rainer and Johanna were divorced in 1935.

In Budapest, on 13 February 1940, Rainer married, secondly, Edith de Kózol, by whom he had no children.

== Ancestry ==
Ancestors of Prince Rainer of Saxe-Coburg and Gotha

8. Prince August of Saxe-Coburg and Gotha
4. Prince Ludwig August of Saxe-Coburg and Gotha
9. Princess Clémentine of Orléans
2. Prince August Leopold of Saxe-Coburg and Gotha
10. Pedro II of Brazil
5. Princess Leopoldina of Brazil
11. Princess Teresa Cristina of the Two Sicilies
1. Prince Rainer of Saxe-Coburg and Gotha
12. Leopold II, Grand Duke of Tuscany
6. Archduke Karl Salvator of Austria
13. Princess Maria Antonia of the Two Sicilies
3. Archduchess Karoline Marie of Austria
14. Ferdinand II of the Two Sicilies
7. Princess Maria Immacolata of Bourbon-Two Sicilies
15. Archduchess Maria Theresa of Austria
