= Princess Maria Karoline of Saxe-Coburg and Gotha =

German princess (1899–1941)

Princess Maria Karoline
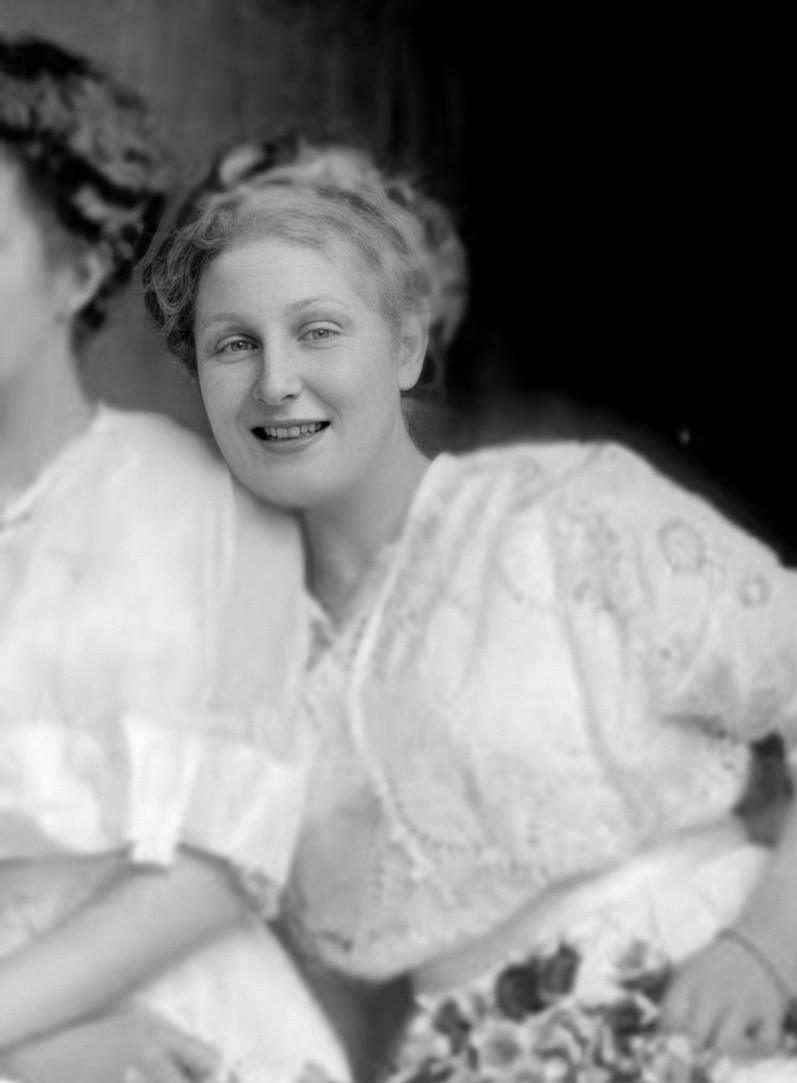
- Born: 10 January 1899; Pula, Austria-Hungary
- Died: 6 June 1941 (aged 42); Hartheim killing centre, Alkoven, Reichsgau Oberdonau
- Burial: St Augustin's Church, Coburg
Names
- German: Maria Karoline Philomena Ignatia Pauline Josepha Michaela Gabriela Raphaela Gonzaga
- House: Saxe-Coburg and Gotha-Koháry
- Father: Prince August Leopold of Saxe-Coburg and Gotha
- Mother: Archduchess Karoline Marie of Austria

Princess Maria Karoline of Saxe-Coburg and Gotha (German: Maria Karoline Philomena Ignatia Pauline Josepha Michaela Gabriela Raphaela Gonzaga Prinzessin von Sachsen-Coburg und Gotha; 10 January 1899 – 6 June 1941) was a German princess from the Brazilian branch of the House of Saxe-Coburg and Gotha-Koháry. She was killed at the Hartheim killing centre as part of the Nazi Aktion T4 program.

== Early life and family ==
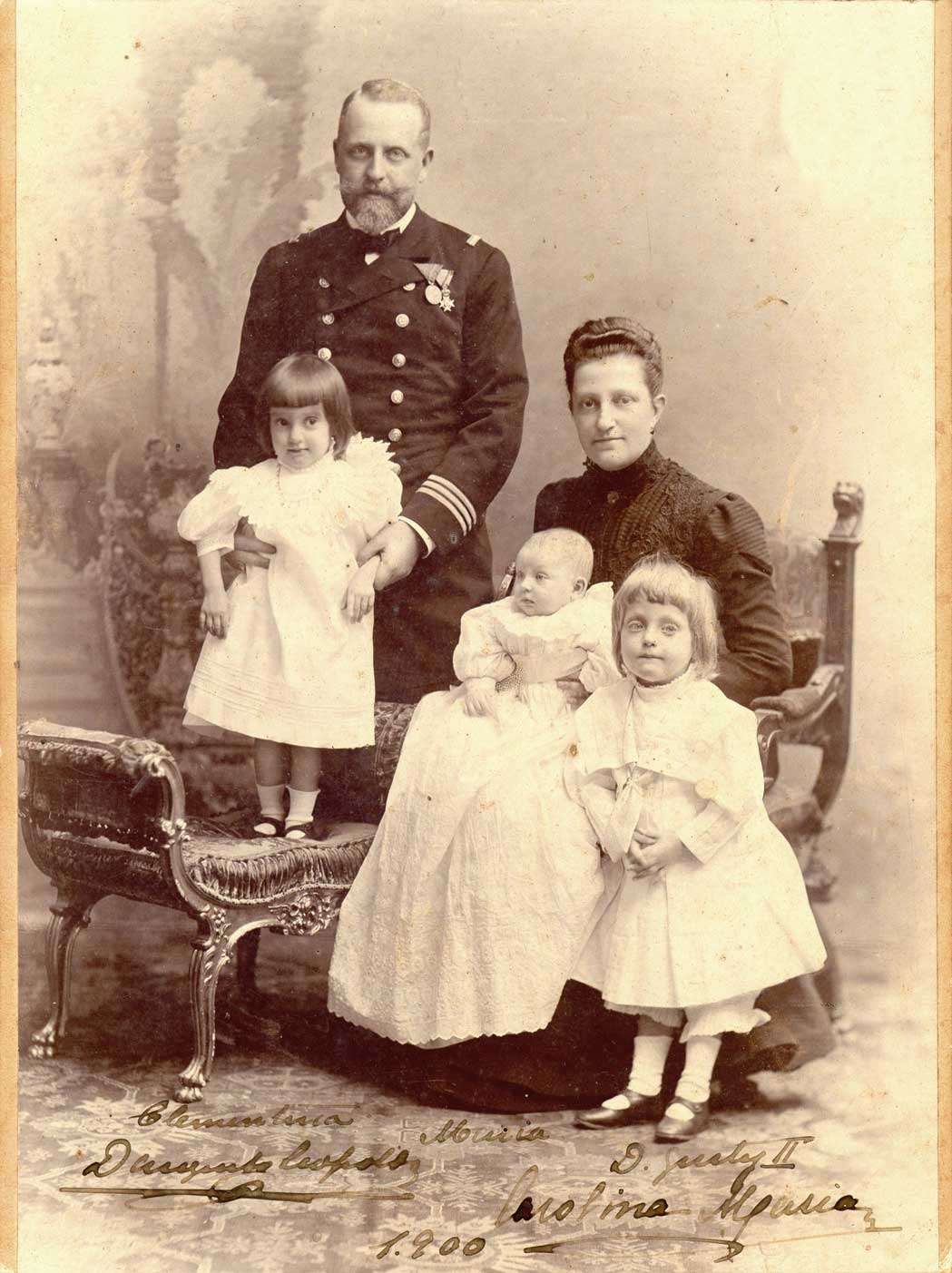
Princess Maria Karoline in her mother's arms, with her father, brother Prince August (left) and sister Princess Klementine (right), c. 1900

Princess Maria Karoline was born on 10 January 1899 in Pula, Austria-Hungary (modern day Croatia), a popular vacation site for the Austro-Hungarian imperial and royal family. She was the second daughter of Prince August Leopold of Saxe-Coburg and Gotha and Archduchess Karoline Marie of Austria. She was a great-granddaughter of Emperor Pedro II of Brazil and a fourth cousin of King George VI of the United Kingdom. Her family formed what was known as the Brazilian line of the House of Saxe-Coburg and Gotha-Koháry.

After the collapse of the Austro-Hungarian and German Empires, the family was able to retain some of their wealth thanks to the Koháry estates. They resided throughout Hungary and in Schladming, Austria.

== Hartheim ==
Maria Karoline had learning difficulties. In 1938, her family placed her in a religious institution. In 1941, she was forcibly removed from the institution by the Nazis and taken to the killing centre at Hartheim Castle where she was killed as part of the Aktion T4 program.

There are questions about whether her relatives, including her brother Prince Rainer of Saxe-Coburg and Gotha and head of the family, Charles Edward, Duke of Saxe-Coburg and Gotha, did anything to protect her. Charles Edward did not intervene because "he had not been concerned that anything would happen to her". He received a letter of condolence claiming that she had died of natural causes, which he did not believe. Unusually for a man who rarely missed family events, he did not attend the funeral.

Her ashes were returned to her family and interred in the crypt of St Augustine's Church in Coburg.

== Bibliography ==
- Alan R. Rushton Charles Edward of Saxe-Coburg : The German Red Cross and the Plan to Kill “Unfit” Citizens 1933-1945, Cambridge, Cambridge Scholars Publishing, 2018, 225 p. (ISBN 978-1-5275-1340-2).
- Olivier Defrance and Joseph van Loon, The Last Kohary - The life of Philipp Josias of Saxe-Coburg and Gotha, Royalty Digest Quarterly, no 4, 2017, p. 1-12 (ISSN 1653-5219)
