= Bordogna =

Bordogna may refer to:

== People ==
- Joseph Bordogna (1933–2019), American scientist and engineer
- Paolo Bordogna (1972–), Italian operatic baritone and bass

== Other uses ==
- Bordogna Plateau, plateau in the Shackleton Coast, Antarctica
- Taxis-Bordogna-Valnigra, old Austro-Italian noble family

== See also ==
- Borgogna (disambiguation)
