= Teresa Cristina =

Teresa Cristina may refer to:

- Teresa Cristina of the Two Sicilies (1822–1889), Portuguese-Brazilian noblewoman
- Princess Teresa Cristina of Saxe-Coburg and Gotha (1902–1990), German-Brazilian noblewoman
- Teresa Cristina (singer) (born 1968), Brazilian singer

== See also ==
- Tereza Cristina (born 1954), Brazilian entrepreneur, agronomic engineer and politician
