= Princess Teresa Cristina of Saxe-Coburg and Gotha =

Princess Teresa Cristina
- Baroness Taxis di Bordogna e Valnigra
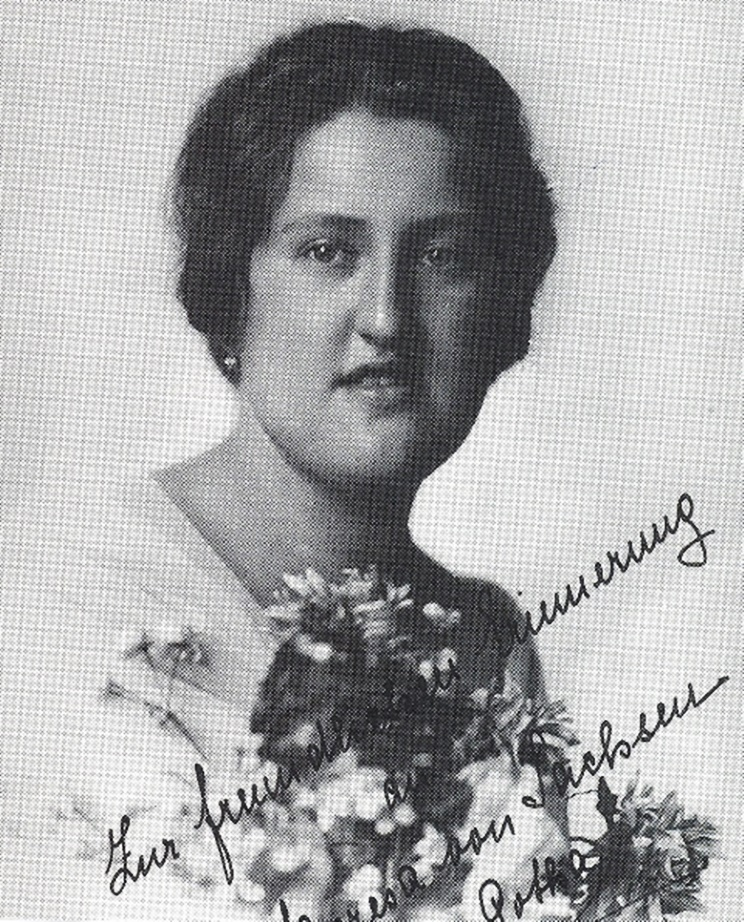
- Born: 23 August 1902; Austria-Hungary
- Died: 24 January 1990 (aged 87); Villach, Austria
- Spouse: Lamoral, Baron Taxis di Bordogna e Valnigra (m. 1930; died 1966)
- Issue Detail: Prince Carlos, Baron Taxis di Bordogna e Valnigra; Princess Alice, Countess di Tolmino e Biglia; Prince Felipe; Princess Maria Cristina, Mrs. Dettori
Names
- (Portuguese: Teresa Cristina Maria Josefa Inácia Benicia Micaela Gabriela Rafaela Gonzaga) (German: Theresia Christiane Maria Josepha Ignatia Benizia Michaela Gabriele Raphaele Gonzaga)
- House: House of Saxe-Coburg-Gotha-Koháry
- Father: Prince August Leopold of Saxe-Coburg and Gotha
- Mother: Archduchess Karoline Marie of Austria

Princess Teresa Cristina of Saxe-Coburg and Gotha (23 August 1902 – 24 January 1990), was a German-Brazilian princess of the House of Saxe-Coburg and Gotha.

== Early life ==
She was born Princess Theresia Christiane Maria Josepha Ignatia Benizia Michaela Gabriele Raphaele Gonzaga of Saxe-Coburg and Gotha at the Thüringen in Austria-Hungary, the sixth child of Prince August Leopold of Saxe-Coburg and Gotha and Archduchess Karoline Marie of Austria.

Her father was the son of Princess Leopoldina of Brazil, daughter of Emperor Pedro II of Brazil and Teresa Cristina of the Two Sicilies, her namesake. Through her mother she was also a great-granddaughter of Leopold II, the last Grand Duke of Tuscany.

Teresa Cristina was the only grandchild of Leopoldina to retain Brazilian nationality.

== Marriage and family ==
Teresa Cristina married in Salzburg on 6 October 1930 to Lamoral, Baron Taxis di Bordogna e Valnigra (1900-1966), the son of Omodeo, Freiherr Taxis Bordogna und Valnigra (1872-1948) and his wife, Franziska "Fanny" von Ottenhaler zu Ottenthal (1877–1955). Their descendants assumed the surname Tasso de Saxe-Coburgo e Bragança. They had four children:

1. Carlos Tasso de Saxe-Coburg e Bragança (born 16 July 1931); married firstly Denise Pais de Almeida and secondly Archduchess Walburga of Austria (born 23 July 1942).
2. Alice Tasso de Saxe-Coburg e Bragança (7 June 1936 – 29 August 2013); married Michele Formentini, Count di Tolmino e Biglia.
3. Felipe Tasso de Saxe-Coburg e Bragança (born 3 January 1939); married Anna Maria Duarte Nunes.
4. Maria Cristina Tasso de Saxe-Coburg e Bragança (born 31 January 1945); married Raimondo Dettori.

== Death ==
She died on 24 January 1990 in Villach, Austria, aged 87.

== Ancestry ==
Ancestors of Princess Teresa Cristina of Saxe-Coburg and Gotha

8. Prince August of Saxe-Coburg and Gotha
4. Prince Ludwig August of Saxe-Coburg and Gotha
9. Princess Clémentine of Orléans
2. Prince August Leopold of Saxe-Coburg and Gotha
10. Pedro II of Brazil
5. Princess Leopoldina of Brazil
11. Princess Teresa Cristina of the Two Sicilies
1. Princess Teresa Cristina of Saxe-Coburg and Gotha
12. Leopold II, Grand Duke of Tuscany
6. Archduke Karl Salvator of Austria
13. Princess Maria Antonia of the Two Sicilies
3. Archduchess Karoline Marie of Austria
14. Ferdinand II of the Two Sicilies
7. Princess Maria Immacolata of Bourbon-Two Sicilies
15. Archduchess Maria Theresa of Austria
