= Borgogna =

Borgogna may refer to:

- Trevisana nera, red Italian wine grape known as Borgogna in Castelucco
- Pinot blanc, white wine grape previously known as Borgogna Bianco
- Adelaide di Borgogna, opera composed by Gioachino Rossini
- Carlo di Borgogna, Italian operas composed by Giovanni Pacini
- Enrico di Borgogna, opera eroica composed by Gaetano Donizetti
- Museo Francesco Borgogna, museum in Vercelli, Italy

== See also ==
- Braquet
- Bordogna (disambiguation)
