= Salvator Dormus pistol =

Salvator-Dormus
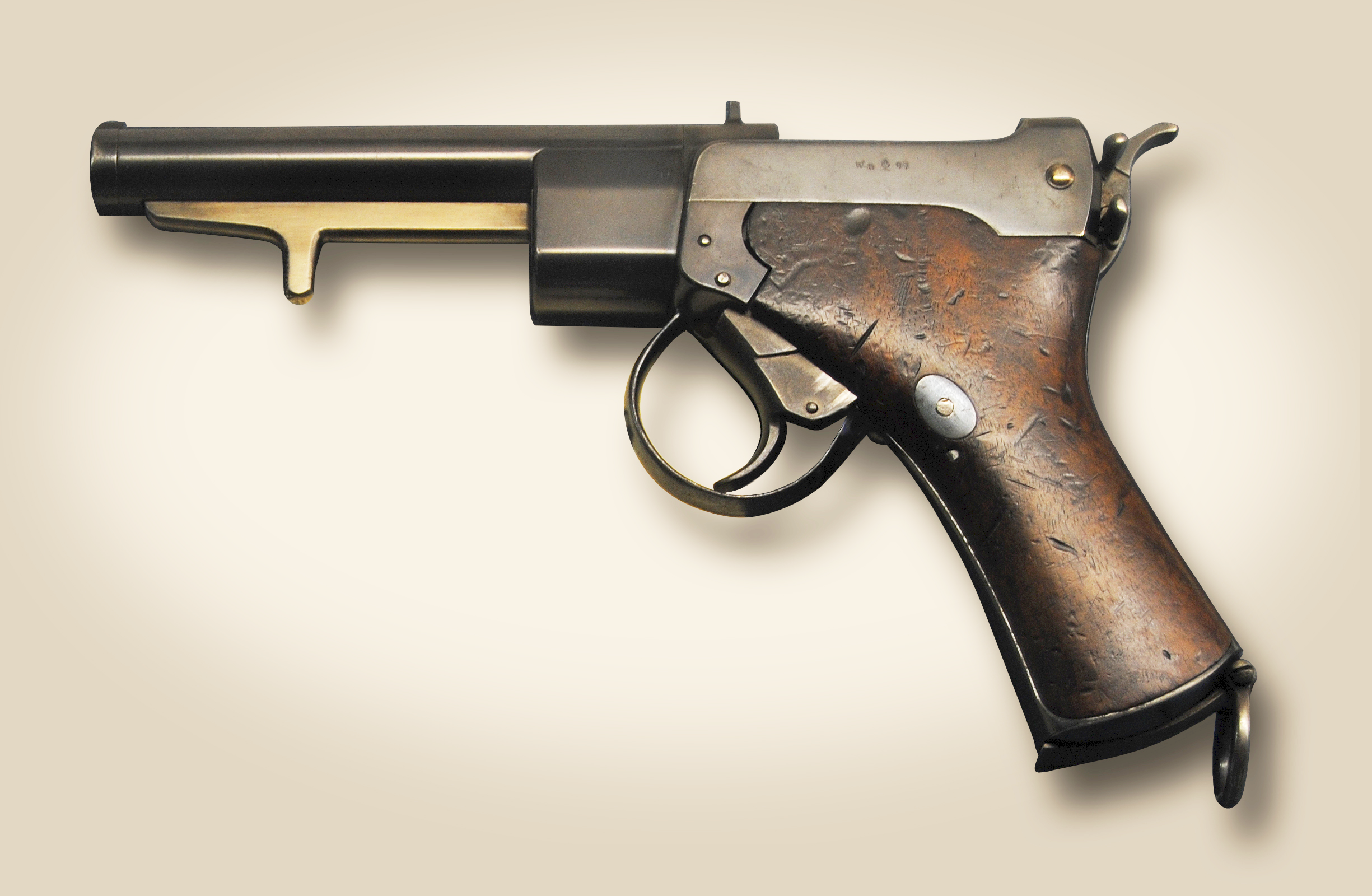
- Type: Semi-automatic pistol
- Place of origin: Austria-Hungary

Production history
- Designer: Archduke Karl Salvator of Austria; Georg von Dormus
- Designed: 1891
- Manufacturer: Œ.W.G.
- Produced: 1895
- No. built: about 50

Specifications
- Cartridge: 8mm Dormus
- Action: Delayed blowback
- Maximum firing range: 40m
- Feed system: 5-round magazine
- Sights: Iron sights

The Salvator-Dormus pistol is the earliest-patented semi-automatic pistol. It was patented on 11 July 1891, by Archduke Karl Salvator of Austria and Count Georg von Dormus. As the first of its kind, it was designed without the benefit of experience with earlier models. Various modifications were made with approximately twenty prototypes before thirty pistols of a workable design were submitted for Austrian military trials in 1896. This 8 mm delayed blowback pistol loads through the top and has a hinged magazine door on the butt. The pistol has a separate bolt release and safety. The production delay between patent and military trials allowed comparisons with other self-loading pistols, and the Salvator Dormus was considered inferior to its competition. The designers abandoned this project; and few pistols survive. The Bundeswehr Museum of German Defense Technology in Koblenz has one of these specimens in its collection.

== Overview ==
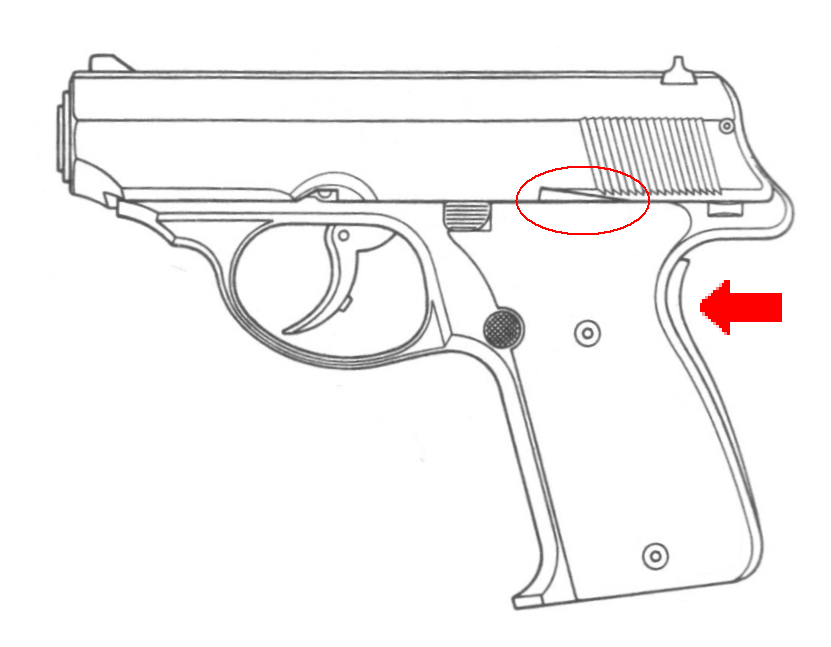
The A.J. Ordnance Thomas .45 uses a similar delayed blowback operation that delays the slide when fully gripped.

The Salvator Dormus pistol uses an unusual grip delayed blowback operation actuated by the trigger pull, when fully pulled back delays the slide otherwise would be a simple blowback operation. This type of operation actuated with a rear grip panel was later used in the A.J. Ordnance Thomas .45 pistol.

== See also ==
- List of delayed blowback firearms
