= Traunsee =

Lake in Upper Austria

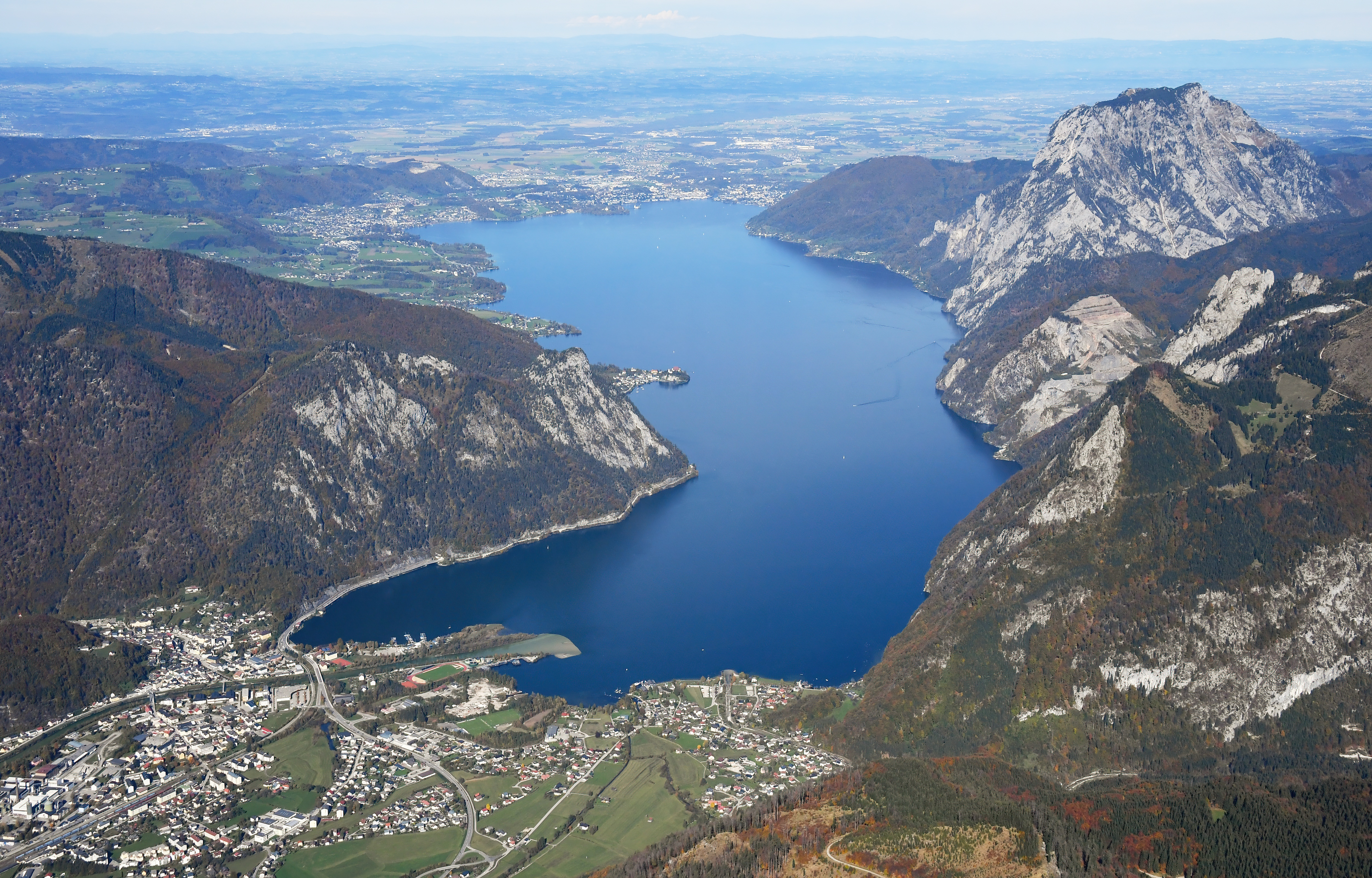
- Aerial view of the Traunsee from the south

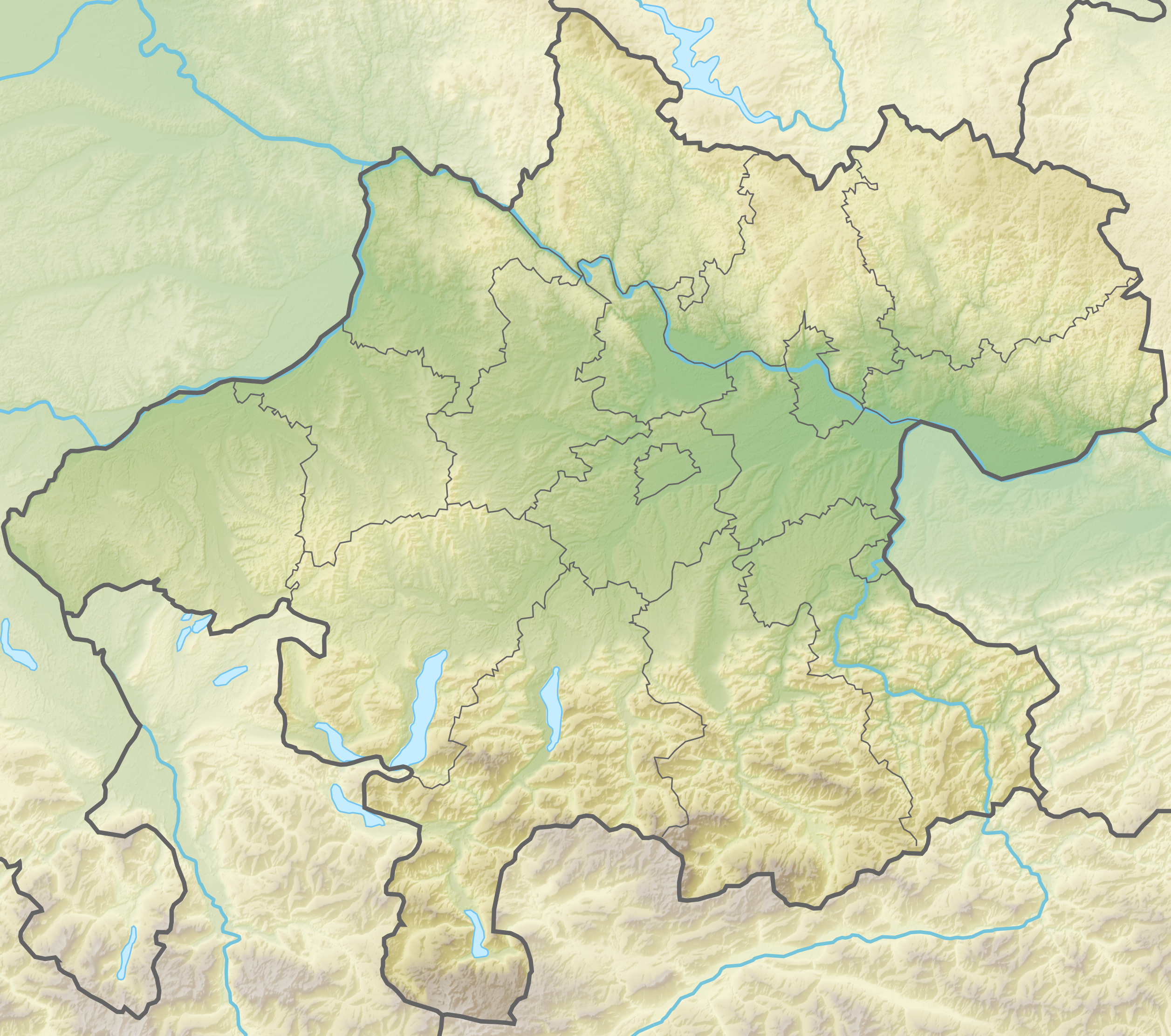
- Location within Austria Location within Upper Austria
- Location: Salzkammergut
- Coordinates: 47°52′N 13°48′E
- Primary inflows: Traun River
- Primary outflows: Traun River
- Basin countries: Austria
- Max. length: 12 km (7.5 mi)
- Max. width: 3 km (1.9 mi)
- Surface area: 24.5 km^{2} (9.5 sq mi)
- Max. depth: 191 m (627 ft)
- Surface elevation: 423 m (1,388 ft)
- Settlements: Gmunden, Ebensee, Altmunster, Traunkirchen

Traunsee (German: [ˈtʁaʊnˌzeː], Austrian German: [ˈtʁaʊnˌseː]) is a lake in the Salzkammergut, Upper Austria, Austria. Its surface is approximately 24.5 km^{2} and its maximum depth of 191 metres makes it the deepest and by volume largest lake located entirely within Austrian territory; only Lake Constance on the border is deeper and bigger. It is a popular tourist destination, and its attractions include Schloss Ort, a medieval castle.

At the North end of the lake is Gmunden, at the south end is Ebensee. The lake is surrounded by mountains, including the Traunstein, and a number of other towns and villages surround the lake, including Altmünster and Traunkirchen.

There is a local legend that speaks of a waterhorse that lives in the lake. Records mention a mermaid riding on the back of a creature who lives in the waters. Locals refer to it as "Lungy" and photographs have been taken of the creature.
