= Taxis-Bordogna-Valnigra =

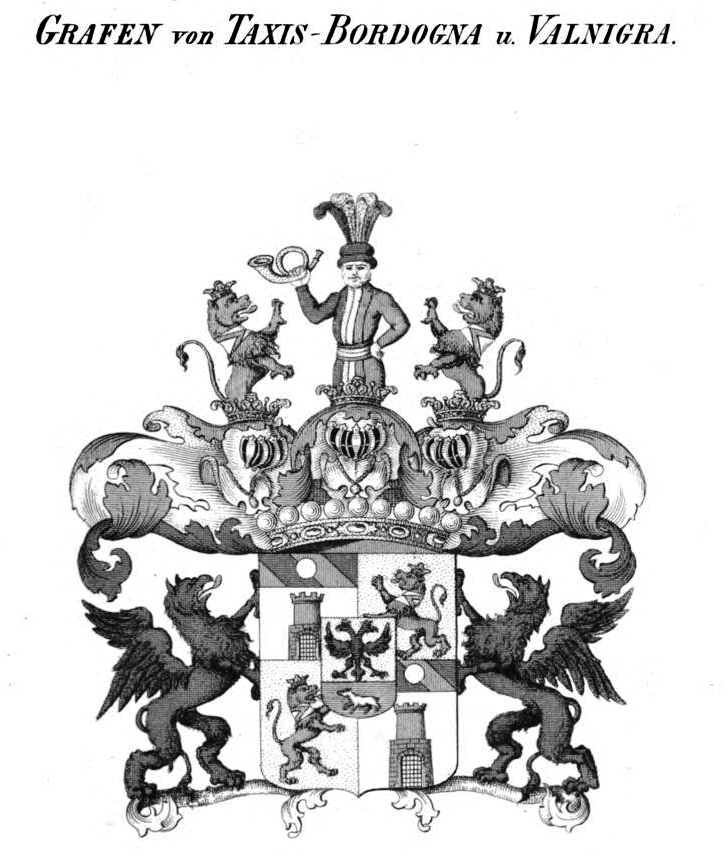
Coat of arms of Counts von Taxis-Bordogna und Valnigra

The House of Taxis-Bordogna und Valnigra is the name of an old Austro-Italian noble family whose members held the position of Imperial Hereditary Postmaster. The family was formed by the descendants of Elisabeth von Taxis († 1518) and her husband Bonus von Bordogna. Elisabeth Taxis was a sister of the Brussels Postmaster General Johann Baptista of Taxis (1470–1541), the ancestor of the Princely House of Thurn and Taxis.

== Family history ==
The House of Taxis-Bordogna-Valnigra was first mentioned in documents in 1148 with Angelbertus de Fondra, and goes back to Bonazolus Fondra de Bordogna (c. 1330).

Bonus von Bordogna worked with his in-laws in the Taxis family's postal system and took over the post office in Trento from his brother-in-law David von Taxis. The next iteration of the family's surname was Bordogna von Taxis. Charles VI, Holy Roman Emperor elevated the Bordogna von Taxis family to the rank of barons and then later to counts under the surname Taxis-Bordogna-Valnigra. The baronial branch held the Lieutenant Postmaster General position in Trento and the Adige and the counts held the Lieutenant Postmaster General position in Bolzano.

The descendants of Lamoral, Baron Taxis di Bordogna e Valnigra (1900–1966) from his marriage to Princess Teresa Cristina of Saxe-Coburg and Gotha (1902–1990), daughter of Prince August Leopold of Saxe-Coburg and Gotha and his wife Archduchess Karoline Marie of Austria, are known by the family name Tasso de Saxe-Coburgo e Bragança. In 1976 Don Carlos Tasso de Saxe-Coburgo e Bragança acquired the Castello di Villalta at Fagagna, which had belonged to the Lords and Counts della Torre from 1433 to 1906. Today, it is owned by Countess Marina and Count Sergio Gelmi di Caporiacco.

== Postmasters and Hereditary Postmaster Colonel ==
- Bonus de Bordogna (1482–1560), Imperial Postmaster of Trento
- Lorenz I Bordogna of Taxis (1510–1559), Imperial Postmaster of Trento
- Johann Baptista Bordogna of Taxis (1538–1593), Imperial Postmaster of Trento
- Lorenz II Bordogna of Taxis (1574–1612), Imperial Postmaster of Trento
- Lorenz III Bordogna of Taxis (1612–1651), Imperial Postmaster of Trento

=== Trento line ===
- Peter Paul Bordogna of Taxis (1639–1706), Imperial Postmaster of Trento
- Lorenz Anton, Baron of Taxis-Bordogna-Valnigra (1671–1744), Hereditary Postmaster Colonel (German: Obrist-Erbpostmeister) of Trento
- Johann Franz, Baron of Taxis-Bordogna-Valnigra (1724–1791), Hereditary Postmaster Colonel of Trento
- Alois Lorenz, Baron of Taxis-Bordogna-Valnigra (1750–1805), Hereditary Postmaster Colonel of Trento
- Peter Vigilius, Baron of Taxis-Bordogna-Valnigra (1780–1836), Hereditary Postmaster Colonel of Trento
- Josef Emmanuel, Baron of Taxis-Bordogna-Valnigra (1834–1886), Hereditary Postmaster Colonel of Trento

=== Bolzano line ===
- Lorenz IV Bordogna of Taxis (1651–1723), Imperial Postmaster of Bolzano
- Ferdinand Philipp, Baron of Taxis-Bordogna-Valnigra (1706–1776), Hereditary Postmaster Colonel of Bolzano
- Franz Josef, Baron of Taxis-Bordogna-Valnigra (1733–1797), Hereditary Postmaster Colonel of Bolzano
- Ägid Josef, Count of Taxis-Bordogna-Valnigra (1782–1862), Hereditary Postmaster Colonel of Bolzano, Imperial Chamberlain and Major General
- Johann Nepomuk, Count of Taxis-Bordogna-Valnigra (1833–1889), Hereditary Postmaster Colonel of Bolzano
- Johann Ägid, Count of Taxis-Bordogna-Valnigra (1856–1930), Hereditary Postmaster Colonel of Bolzano

== Literature ==
- Lamoral Freiherr von Taxis-Bordogna, Erhard Riedel: Zur Geschichte der Freiherrn und Grafen Taxis-Bordogna-Valnigra und ihrer Obrist-Erbpostämter zu Bozen, Trient und an der Etsch, Innsbruck 1955
