= Prince Philipp of Saxe-Coburg and Gotha (1901–1985) =

Austrian-born German prince

Prince Philipp
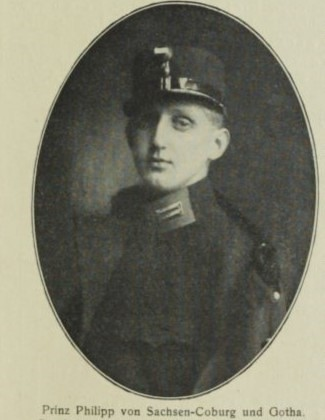
- Philipp in 1919
- Born: 18 August 1901; Walterskirchen, Vienna
- Died: 18 October 1985 (aged 84); Vienna
- Burial: Hietzing Cemetery, Vienna
- Spouse: Sárah Aurelia Hálasz (m. 1944)
- Issue: Prince Philipp August of Saxe-Coburg and Gotha
Names
- Philipp Josias Maria Joseph Ignatius Michael Gabriel Raphael Gonzaga
- House: Saxe-Coburg and Gotha-Koháry
- Father: Prince August Leopold of Saxe-Coburg and Gotha
- Mother: Archduchess Karoline Marie of Austria
- Religion: Catholicism

Prince Philipp of Saxe-Coburg and Gotha (Philipp Josias Maria Joseph Ignatius Michael Gabriel Raphael Gonzaga; 18 August 1901 – 18 October 1985) was a dynast of the House of Wettin, belonging to the House of Saxe-Coburg and Gotha-Koháry. He was the last Fideikommissherr of the branch.

== Life ==
Born in Walterskirchen in Lower Austria, he was the third son of Prince August Leopold of Saxe-Coburg and Gotha and his wife Archduchess Karoline Marie of Austria. At the time of his birth the House of Wettin ruled the Kingdom of Saxony and the Ernestine duchies in Germany, as well as the kingdoms of Belgium, Portugal, Bulgaria and the United Kingdom. He was raised, however, on his family's estates in Austria. After 1933 Prince Philipp supported financially German émigrés and Resistance to Nazism. In 1934, he hired the well-known Christian opponent of the Nazi Party, Eugen Kogon to take over the asset management of the House of Saxe-Coburg-Koháry. After the Anschluss in March 1938 Kogon was arrested and, in September 1939, was deported to Buchenwald.

When he was a teenager all five of the thrones held by his family in Germany were abolished, but his family retained their lands and private property until those located, after World War II, in East Germany and in other Iron Curtain countries were confiscated. Philipp took up residence in Vienna in the Austrian Republic.

== Marriage and issue ==
In Budapest on 23 September 1944 Prince Philipp married, in non-compliance with the dynasty's house laws, Sárah Aurelia Hálasz (Orsova, Romania 8 February 1914-Vienna 31 December 1994), daughter of Imre Hálasz and Aurelia Maximovics Saladuchin, born into an academic family. Six months prior to, and legitimised by, their marriage they had one son, who bore the ducal surname and title but was not recognized as a member of the dynasty:

- Prince Philipp August of Saxe-Coburg and Gotha (1944–2014), who; on his parents' wedding anniversary in 1968, wed Bettina Pfretzschner (1944–1989). They had three children: Upon the death of his first wife, Philipp August remarried Rosemarie Jäger (born 1952) in 1991. A child was born from this second marriage.
  - Isabelle Prinzessin von Sachsen-Coburg und Gotha（born 1969）
  - Maximilian Prinz von Sachsen-Coburg und Gotha (born 1972), who wed Christina Schnell. They have one daughter:
    - Franziska Marie Prinzessin von Sachsen-Coburg und Gotha (born 2009）
  - Alexander Ernst Prinz von Sachsen-Coburg und Gotha (born 1978）
  - Christina Prinzessin von Sachsen-Coburg und Gotha (born 1995）

== Ancestry ==
Ancestors of Prince Philipp of Saxe-Coburg and Gotha (1901–1985)

8. Prince August of Saxe-Coburg and Gotha
4. Prince Ludwig August of Saxe-Coburg and Gotha
9. Princess Clémentine of Orléans
2. Prince August Leopold of Saxe-Coburg and Gotha
10. Pedro II of Brazil
5. Princess Leopoldina of Brazil
11. Princess Teresa Cristina of the Two Sicilies
1. Prince Philipp Josias of Saxe-Coburg and Gotha
12. Leopold II, Grand Duke of Tuscany
6. Archduke Karl Salvator of Austria
13. Princess Maria Antonia of the Two Sicilies
3. Archduchess Karoline Marie of Austria
14. Ferdinand II of the Two Sicilies
7. Princess Maria Immacolata of Bourbon-Two Sicilies
15. Archduchess Maria Theresa of Austria

== Bibliography ==
- Olivier Defrance, Joseph van Loon: Philipp Josias de Saxe-Cobourg et Gotha, un cousin méconnu de nos rois. Museum Dynasticum, Bruxelles, XXX/1 2018.
