= Carlos Tasso of Saxe-Coburgo and Braganza =

Historian

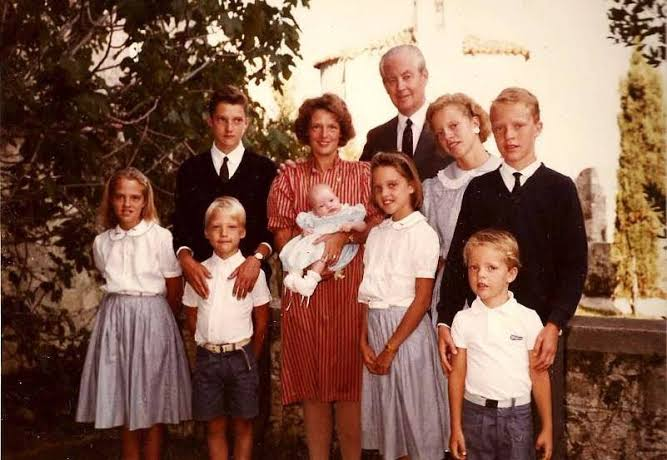
- Carlos Tasso with his second wife and children in 1985.

Head of Saxe-Coburg and Braganza branch
- Tenure: 24 January 1990– present
- Predecessor: Cristina of Saxe-Coburg and Gotha
- Heir apparent: Prince Afonso Carlos Tasso of Saxe-Coburg and Braganza
- Born: Carlos Tasso de Saxe-Coburgo e Braganca; 16 July 1931 (age 95); Gmunden, Austria
- Spouse: Denyse Paes de Almeida (m. 1956, d. 1967); Walburga of Austria-Tuscany (m. 1969)
- Issue: Afonso Carlos Tasso of Saxe-Coburg and Braganza (1970) Tereza-Cristina Tasso of Saxe-Coburg and Braganza (1971); José Tasso of Saxe-Coburg and Braganca (1972); Maria Leopoldina Tasso of Saxe-Coburg and Braganza (1974); Carolina Tasso of Saxe-Coburg and Braganza (1976); Antonio Tasso of Saxe-Coburg and Braganza (1979); Fernando Carlos Tasso of Saxe-Coburg and Braganza (1980-1990) Maria Aparecida Tasso of Saxe-Coburg and Braganca (1985)
- Cadet Branch: Saxe-Coburg and Braganza
- Father: Lamoral Taxis, Baron di Bordogna e Valnigra
- Mother: Cristina of Saxe-Coburg and Gotha
- Religion: Roman Catholic
- Occupation: Historian

Carlos Tasso of Saxe-Coburg and Braganza (Gmunden, 16 July 1931) is a historian and writer. He is a descendant of the Brazilian imperial family and head of the House of Saxe-Coburg and Braganza, a branch of the Imperial House of Brazil. Carlos is the great-grandson of Princess Leopoldina of Brazil, youngest daughter of Emperor Pedro II. He succeeded his mother Teresa Cristina of Saxe-Coburg and Gotha in 1990.

== Biography ==
Born in Austria and registered as a Brazilian at the Brazilian Consulate in Vienna, Carlos Tasso is the eldest son of Princess Teresa Cristina of Saxe-Coburg and Braganza, the third daughter of Augusto Leopoldo, and Baron Lamoral Taxis of Bordogna and Valnigra. He has two sisters, Alice and Maria Cristina, and a younger brother, Filipe, who served as a lieutenant in the Brazilian navy.

On 15 December 1956, he married for the first time the Brazilian Denise Pais de Almeida (b. 1936), from São Paulo, with whom he had no children. On 17 January 1969, Carlos Tasso married Walburga of Austria-Tuscany, Princess of Tuscany and Archduchess of Austria, daughter of Archduke George of Austria-Tuscany and Countess Maria Valeria of Waldburg-Zeil-Hohenems, and great-granddaughter of Grand Duke Ferdinand IV of Tuscany. He and his second wife had eight children, who also retain Brazilian nationality.

His dedication to the study of Brazilian history began at a young age. He studied in Austria, Italy and Brazil, at the traditional Santo Inácio College and the Pontifical Catholic University of Rio de Janeiro, both located in the city of Rio de Janeiro. He has published several works and still carries out historical and economic research on Brazil. Since 1966, he has been a member of the Historical and Geographical Institute of Rio Grande do Sul (IHGRGS), and is also involved in other cultural organisations. He was also president of the Italian Rotary International between 1992 and 1993.

He was a coffee grower in the Brazilian state of Paraná, an activity he no longer practises, worked in Frankfurt as director of Henniger International and owns an agricultural company based in Villalta Castle in northern Italy, a legacy of his paternal ancestors.

He is a member of the Brazilian Historical and Geographical Institute, a corresponding member of the PEN Club of Brazil in Portugal, a member of the Portuguese Academy of History, a member of the Royal Spanish Academy of History, a member of the I.H.G. of Petrópolis.

== Publications ==
- (1961). Vultos do Brasil Imperial na Ordem Ernestina da Saxônia. Anais do Museu Histórico Nacional, 12.
- (1968). O Ramo Brasileiro da Casa de Bragança. Anais do Museu Histórico Nacional, 18.
- (2007). O Imperador e a Atriz” – Dom Pedro II e Adelaide Ristori. Caxias do Sul: Universidade de Caxias do Sul.
- (2009). A Princesa Flor – Dona Maria Amélia, a filha mais linda de D. Pedro I do Brasil e IV do Nome de Portugal. Funchal, Madeira: Edição Direção Regional Assuntos Culturais. (Prêmio 8º Conde dos Arcos da Academia Portuguesa da História, no ano de 2010)
- (2010). Dom Pedro II em Viena 1871-1877. Florianópolis: Insular; I.H.G.S.C.
- (2011). Dona Maria Amélia de Bragança. Aveleda, Portugal: Academia Portuguesa da História; Ed. e Conteudos S.A.
- (2012). “A Intriga” – Retrospecto de Intricados Acontecimentos Históricos e suas Consequências no Brasil Imperial. São Paulo: Senac. ISBN 9788539613373.
- (2014). Dom Pedro II na Alemanha - Uma amizade tradicional. São Paulo: Senac.
- (2018). O mistério do livro perdido. Rio de Janeiro: Viajante do Tempo. ISBN 978-85-63382-80-1.

In 2009, he received the 8th Conde dos Arcos Viceroy of Brazil award from the Portuguese Academy of History,which aims to honour research studies in the field of Luso-Brazilian History, in distinction for the book ‘Princesa Flor - Dona Maria Amélia, a filha mais linda de D. Pedro I do Brasil e IV do Nome de Portugal’.

One of Carlos Tasso's most recent works, A Intriga, from 2012, received a review written by Dr Antonio Alexandre Bispo, Professor at the University of Cologne, Germany, and published in the Revista do Instituto Histórico e Geográfico Brasileiro (R. IHGB, Rio de Janeiro, a. 176 (466):265-266, Jan./Mar. 2015), in which he points out that in A Intriga, ‘in addition to the family archives, the author bases this work on work carried out in a large number of Brazilian and European archives. It is therefore a well-founded work of scientific rigour, which takes into account a vast amount of original documentation, and which cannot be taken as a simple historical novel designed simply to bring to light the international intrigues at the time of the marriage negotiations between Princesses Isabel and Leopoldina, Pedro II's daughters.’
