= Archduke Karl Salvator of Austria =

Archduke of Austria and gun inventor (1839–1892)

Archduke Karl Salvator
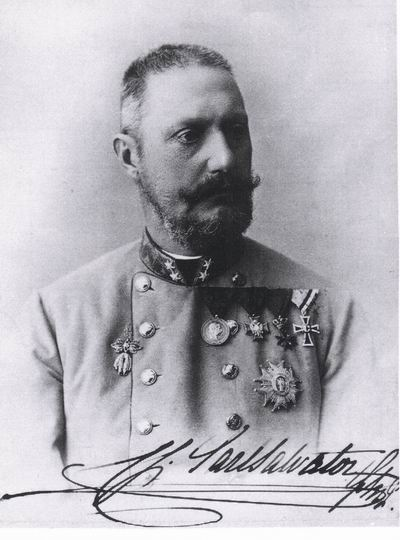
- Karl Salvator c. 1880
- Born: 30 April 1839; Florence, Grand Duchy of Tuscany
- Died: 18 January 1892 (aged 52); Vienna, Austria-Hungary
- Spouse: Princess Maria Immaculata of Bourbon-Two Sicilies (m. 1861)
- Issue: Archduchess Maria Theresia; Archduke Leopold Salvator; Archduke Franz Salvator; Karoline Marie, Princess of Saxe-Coburg and Gotha; Archduke Albrecht Salvator; Archduchess Maria Antonia; Maria Immaculata, Duchess of Württemberg; Archduke Rainier Salvator; Archduchess Henrietta; Archduke Ferdinand Salvator
Names
- German: Karl Salvator Maria Joseph Johann Baptist Phillipp Jacob Januarius Ludwig Gonzaga Rainer; Italian: Carlo Salvatore Maria Giuseppe Giovanni Battista Filippo Jacopo Gennaro Lodovico Gonzaga Raniero
- House: Habsburg-Tuscany
- Father: Leopold II, Grand Duke of Tuscany
- Mother: Princess Maria Antonia of the Two Sicilies

Archduke Karl Salvator of Austria (Italian: Carlo Salvatore Maria Giuseppe Giovanni Battista Filippo Jacopo Gennaro Lodovico Gonzaga Raniero; German: Karl Salvator Maria Joseph Johann Baptist Philipp Jakob Januarius Ludwig Gonzaga Rainer; 30 April 1839 in Florence – 18 January 1892 in Vienna), was a member of the Tuscan branch of the House of Habsburg.

== Early life and career ==
He was an Austrian Archduke, a son of Leopold II, Grand Duke of Tuscany and second wife Maria Antonia, Grand Duchess of Tuscany. He was a Feldmarschall-Leutnant of the Imperial (k.u.k.) Austro-Hungarian Army. He worked with Count George von Dormus as inventor of early self-loading small arms including the Salvator Dormus pistol and the Salvator-Dormus M1893 heavy machine gun.

== Family and children ==
He married in Rome on 19 September 1861 his first cousin Princess Maria Immaculata of Bourbon-Two Sicilies, daughter of his maternal uncle Ferdinand II of the Two Sicilies, and second wife Maria Theresa of Austria.

Their children were:

- Archduchess Maria Theresia (Alt-Bunzlau, 18 September 1862 – 10 May 1933), married in Vienna on 28 February 1886 Archduke Charles Stephen of Austria (1860 – 1933) and had issue.
- Archduke Leopold Salvator (Alt-Bunzlau, Bohemia, 15 October 1863 – Vienna, 4 September 1931), married in Frohsdorf on 24 October 1889 Princess Blanca of Bourbon (1868 – 1949), and had issue
- Archduke Franz Salvator (Altmünster, 21 August 1866 – Vienna, 20 April 1939), married firstly in Ischl on 31 July 1890 Archduchess Marie Valerie of Austria (1868 – 1924), and had issue, and married secondly morganatically in Vienna on 28 April 1934 Melanie Freiin von Riesenfels (1898 – 1984), without issue
- Archduchess Karoline Marie (Altmünster, 5 September 1869 – Budapest, 12 May 1945), married in Vienna on 30 May 1894 Prince August Leopold of Saxe-Coburg and Gotha (1867 – 1922) and had issue.
- Archduke Albrecht Salvator (Alt-Bunzlau, 22 November 1871 – Bolzano, 27 February 1896), unmarried and without issue
- Archduchess Maria Antonia (Vienna, 18 April 1874 – Arco, 14 January 1891)
- Archduchess Maria Immaculata (Baden bei Wien, 3 September 1878 – Schloss Altshausen, 25 November 1968), married in Vienna on 29 October 1900 Duke Robert of Württemberg (1873 – 1947) without issue
- Archduke Rainer Salvator (Vienna, 27 February 1880 – Arco, 4 May 1889)
- Archduchess Henrietta Maria (Vienna, 20 February 1884 – Traunkirchen, 13 August 1886)
- Archduke Ferdinand Salvator (Baden bei Wien, 2 June 1888 – Traunkirchen, 28 July 1891)

== Ancestry ==
Ancestors of Archduke Karl Salvator of Austria

8. Leopold II, Holy Roman Emperor
4. Ferdinand III, Grand Duke of Tuscany
9. Infanta Maria Louise of Spain
2. Leopold II, Grand Duke of Tuscany
10. Ferdinand I of the Two Sicilies
5. Princess Luisa of Naples and Sicily
11. Archduchess Maria Carolina of Austria
1. Archduke Karl Salvator of Austria
12. Ferdinand I of the Two Sicilies (= 10)
6. Francis I of the Two Sicilies
13. Archduchess Maria Carolina of Austria (= 11)
3. Princess Maria Antonia of the Two Sicilies
14. Charles IV of Spain
7. Infanta Maria Isabella of Spain
15. Infanta Maria Luisa of Parma
