= Prince August Leopold of Saxe-Coburg and Gotha =

Brazilian and German prince

Prince August Leopold
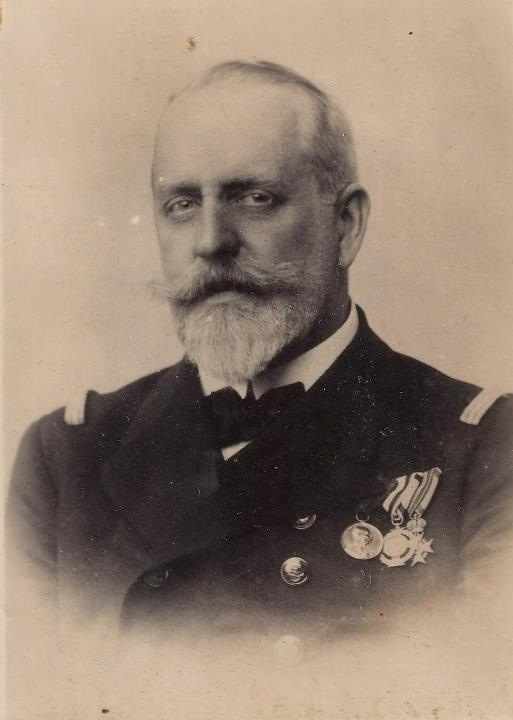
- August Leopold c. 1918
- Born: Prinz August Leopold von Sachsen-Coburg und Gotha und Braganza, Herzog von Sachsen, Prinz von Brasilien; 6 December 1867; Rio de Janeiro, Empire of Brazil
- Died: 11 October 1922 (aged 54); Schladming, Austria
- Burial: St. Augustin, Coburg
- Spouse: Archduchess Karoline Marie of Austria (m. 1894)
- Issue: Princess Klementine; Princess Maria Karoline; Prince Rainer; Prince Philipp; Princess Theresia Christiane; Princess Leopoldine; Prince Franz
Names
- August Leopold Philipp Maria Michael Gabriel Raphael Gonzaga
- House: Saxe-Coburg and Gotha-Koháry
- Father: Prince Ludwig August of Saxe-Coburg and Gotha
- Mother: Princess Leopoldina of Brazil

Prince August Leopold of Saxe-Coburg and Gotha and Braganza (6 December 1867 – 11 October 1922), known in Brazil as Dom Augusto Leopoldo, was a prince of the Empire of Brazil and of the House of Saxe-Coburg and Gotha-Koháry. He was the second of four sons born to German Prince Ludwig August of Saxe-Coburg and Gotha and Princess Leopoldina of Brazil.

The second grandson of the Emperor Pedro II, the prince was, for some years included among the presumptive heirs to the Imperial Crown of Brazil. Their descendants would form the Saxe-Coburg and Gotha branch of the Imperial House of Brazil.

== Biography ==
=== Early life ===
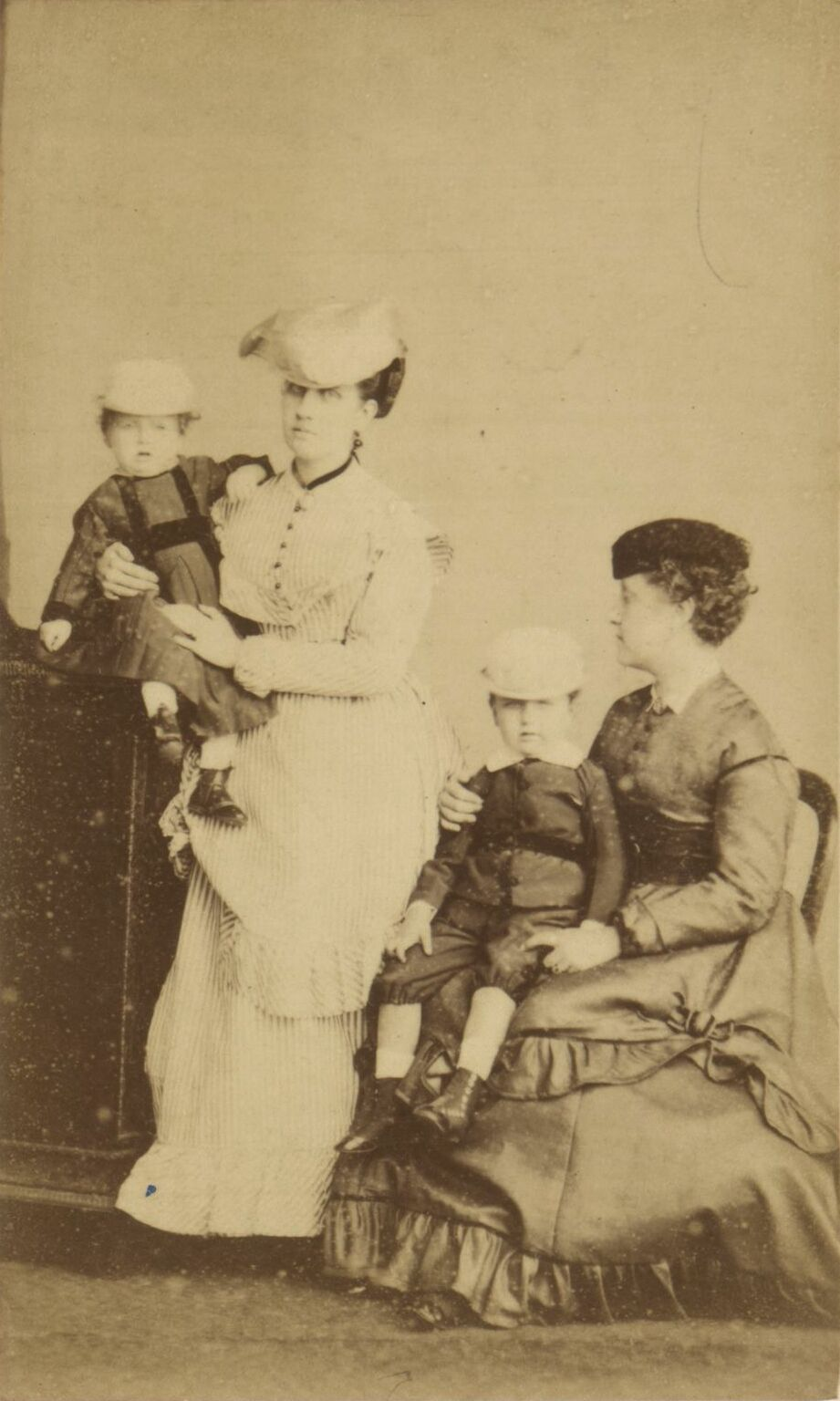
August's mother (standing), holding him, and aunt Isabel (seated), holding his brother Peter August (Rio de Janeiro, 1866)

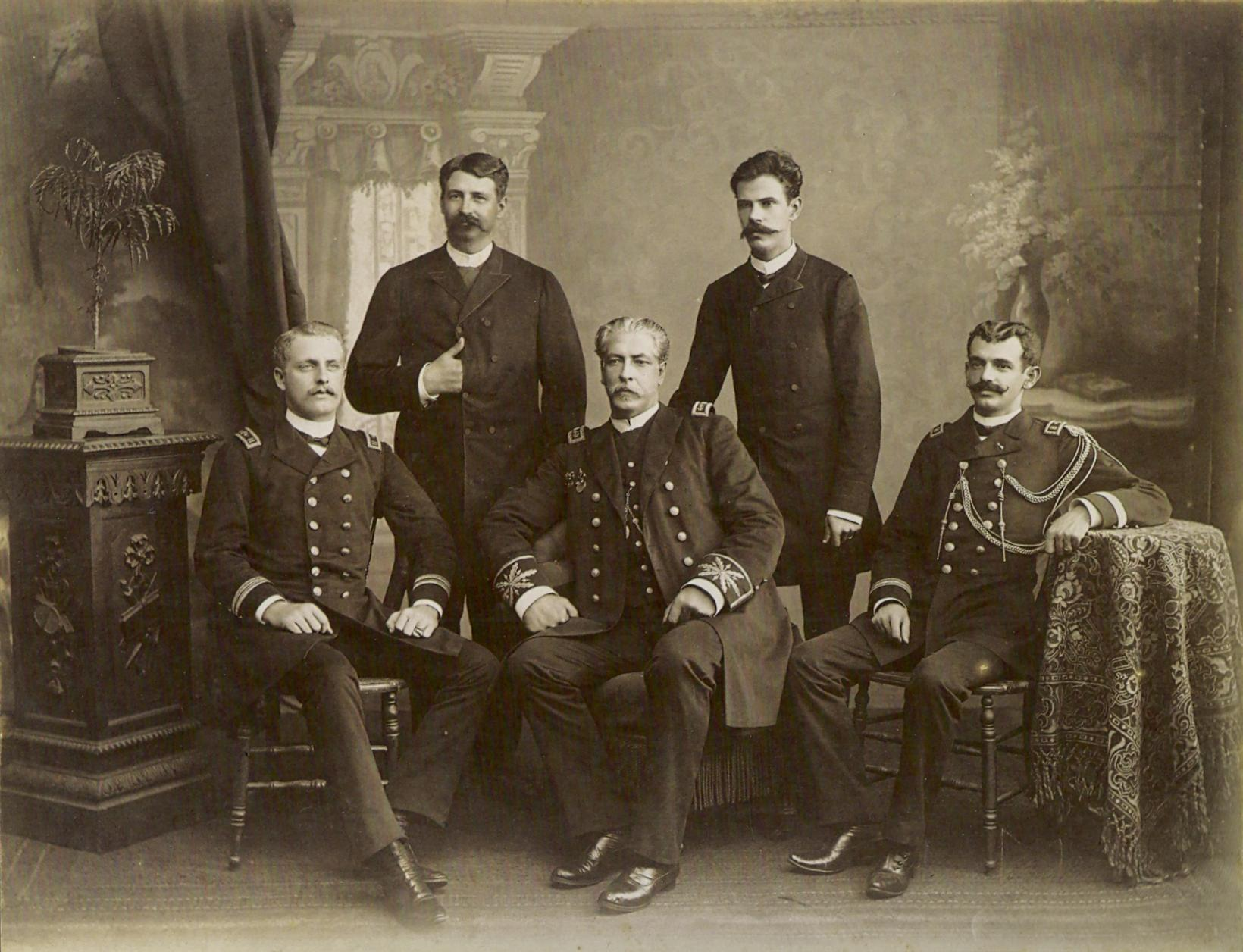
Prince Augusto (seated on the left) as Admiral Wandenkolk's helper in the center

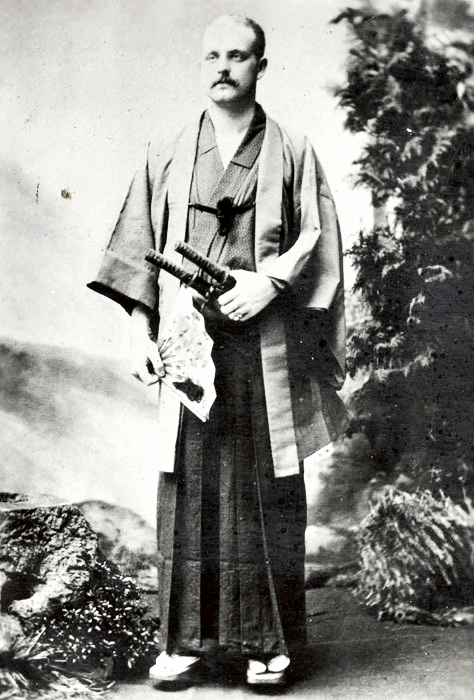
The Prince in typical Japanese costumes during the Almirante Barroso Cruiser scale in Japan in 1889

Born Prince August Leopold Philipp Maria Michael Gabriel Raphael Gonzaga of Saxe-Coburg-Gotha, Duke in Saxony, in Rio de Janeiro, Brazil, he was the second son of Prince Ludwig August of Saxe-Coburg and Gotha and Leopoldina of Braganza, Princess of Brazil. His paternal grandparents were Prince August of Saxe-Coburg and Gotha and Princess Clémentine of Orléans (daughter of King Louis Philippe I of France) and his maternal grandparents were Emperor Pedro II of Brazil and Empress Teresa Cristina (daughter of King Francis I of the Two Sicilies). His elder brother was Prince Pedro Augusto of Saxe-Coburg and Gotha; his two younger brothers were Prince Joseph and Ludwig Gaston.

His birth was announced by the Emperor to the nation in the speech from the throne of 9 May 1868:

I am pleased to announce to you that my beloved daughter, Princess Leopoldina, having returned from Europe with the Duke of Saxony, my very dear son-in-law, gave birth on December 6 of last year to a prince, who was given the name of Augusto.

Back in Europe, Princess Leopoldina reported from her youngest sister. The prince, however, had little contact with his mother, who died on 7 February 1871 when he was a little over three years old. His father decided to settle definitively in Austria-Hungary, where his children were in the care of their paternal grandmother. Isabel, Princess Imperial of Brazil had not yet had any children at the time of her sister's death and the lack of heirs had already caused concern among the Brazilians. In a letter dated 4 March 1871 the Brazilian ambassador to Vienna, Francisco Adolfo de Varnhagen (future Viscount of Porto Seguro), said to the Emperor:

If the august grandchildren of HIM, Sr, will one day be princes of the Empire, all Brazilians will desire that they be brought up and educated in Brazil, whereas nothing will lose any of them with such education, if luck will call it to another destination in Europe, and it is less likely that it seems that the succession may fall to their kin, can not conceive in this respect anything impossible if anyone remembers that (in the history of Portugal itself) to reach To compel the throne to the fortunate Dom Manuel, he had to take charge of taking before him, as I recall, some kin who had first right to the throne of Dom João II.

In his first trip to Europe, still in 1871, Emperor Pedro II decided to bring his grandchildren to Brazil, to create them as eventual heirs to the throne. A family council determined that Princess Leopoldina's two eldest children would be cared for by their maternal grandparents, being raised and educated in Brazil. Thus, on 1 April 1872, Dom Pedro Augusto and Dom Augusto Leopoldo, accompanied by the imperial couple, arrived in Rio de Janeiro, where they were received with great enthusiasm.

The re-acclimatization to the native homeland was difficult for the brothers. Accustomed to the luxury of the palaces of Vienna and Styria, they began to live in the modest and old-fashioned Palace of São Cristóvão, where they played little because of the rigid routine of studies imposed by their grandfather. They had as preceptor the then rector of the Externato Dom Pedro II, Joaquim Pacheco da Silva (future Baron of Pacheco), and they spent the days training mount and studying French classics, rhetoric, history, geography, languages and music.

Although his older brother enjoyed the status of Pedro II's favorite grandson, due to their affinity for studies, other chroniclers noted that Augusto's temper, completely opposite to that of his grandfather, made him the monarch's favorite.

=== Career ===
Having inherited from his father and grandfather's love for the Navy, he entered as an aspirant at the Naval Academy in December 1882, at the age of fifteen. With a school curriculum described as brilliant, Augusto formed a marine guard in 1886.

In the Imperial Brazilian Navy, Prince Augusto arrived at the post of second lieutenant (equivalent, now the first lieutenant), serving on board the Niterói Corvette, the battleship Riachuelo and the cruiser Almirante Barroso, in addition to being the helper of orders of Admiral Eduardo Wandenkolk, future republican leader.

=== Republic and exile ===
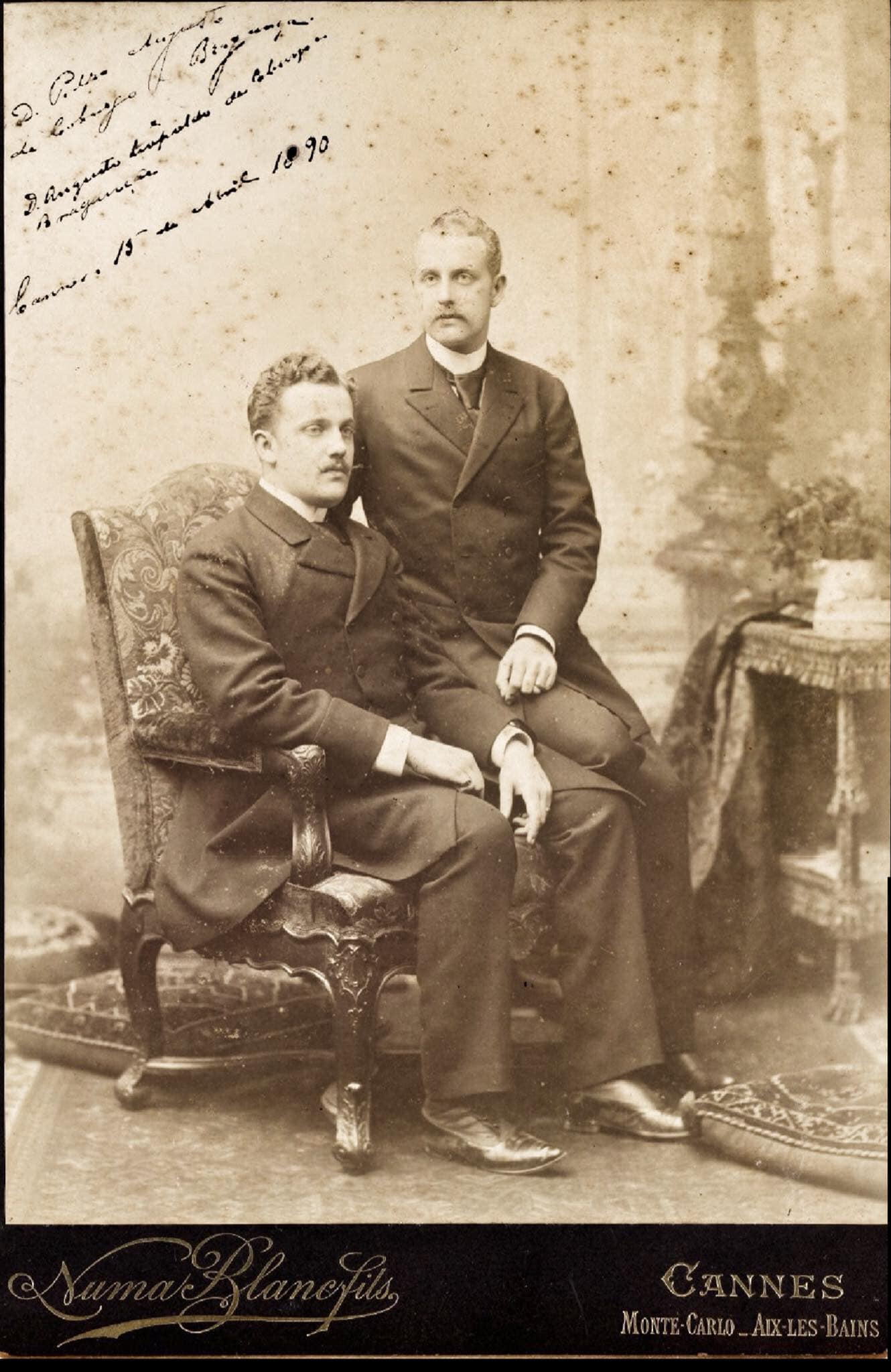
Prince Augusto (right) and his older brother in Cannes during the exile of the Brazilian imperial family, 1890

On 15 November 1889 the prince was in the East, on board Almirante Barroso (who was on his first circumnavigation trip), when a coup d'état ended the monarchical regime in Brazil. Communication difficulties prevented the crew from learning about what happened before December. Telegrams of Admiral Wandenkolk - now Minister of the Navy of the provisional government - instructed the commander of the cruiser to replace the imperial insignia of the flags and to induce Augusto to resign. After consulting his grandfather and his uncle, the Count d'Eu, the prince decided not to resign, but to request a license of two months. In telegram, the minister responded to the request: "Prince resignation service, I grant leave. Wandenkolk."

Dom Augusto disembarked in Colombo, Ceylon, where the crew offered him a farewell dinner. Excited, the prince distributed his belongings among his companions.

After a few months, he joined his family and remained with Emperor Pedro II until his death on 5 December 1891. After that, he settled in Vienna, where he obtained, through his father, the special permission of Emperor Franz Joseph I of Austria to join the Austro-Hungarian Navy. Having conducted the entrance examinations, Prince Augusto was admitted to the Austrian naval reserve without prejudice to his status as a Brazilian citizen, as he explained in a letter dated 6 May 1893 to Baron of Estrela, his attorney in Brazil:

As I wrote to Antonio, I decided to enter the service of Austria, since the Emperor welcomed me as a Brazilian prince, without my having to lose my Brazilian rights...

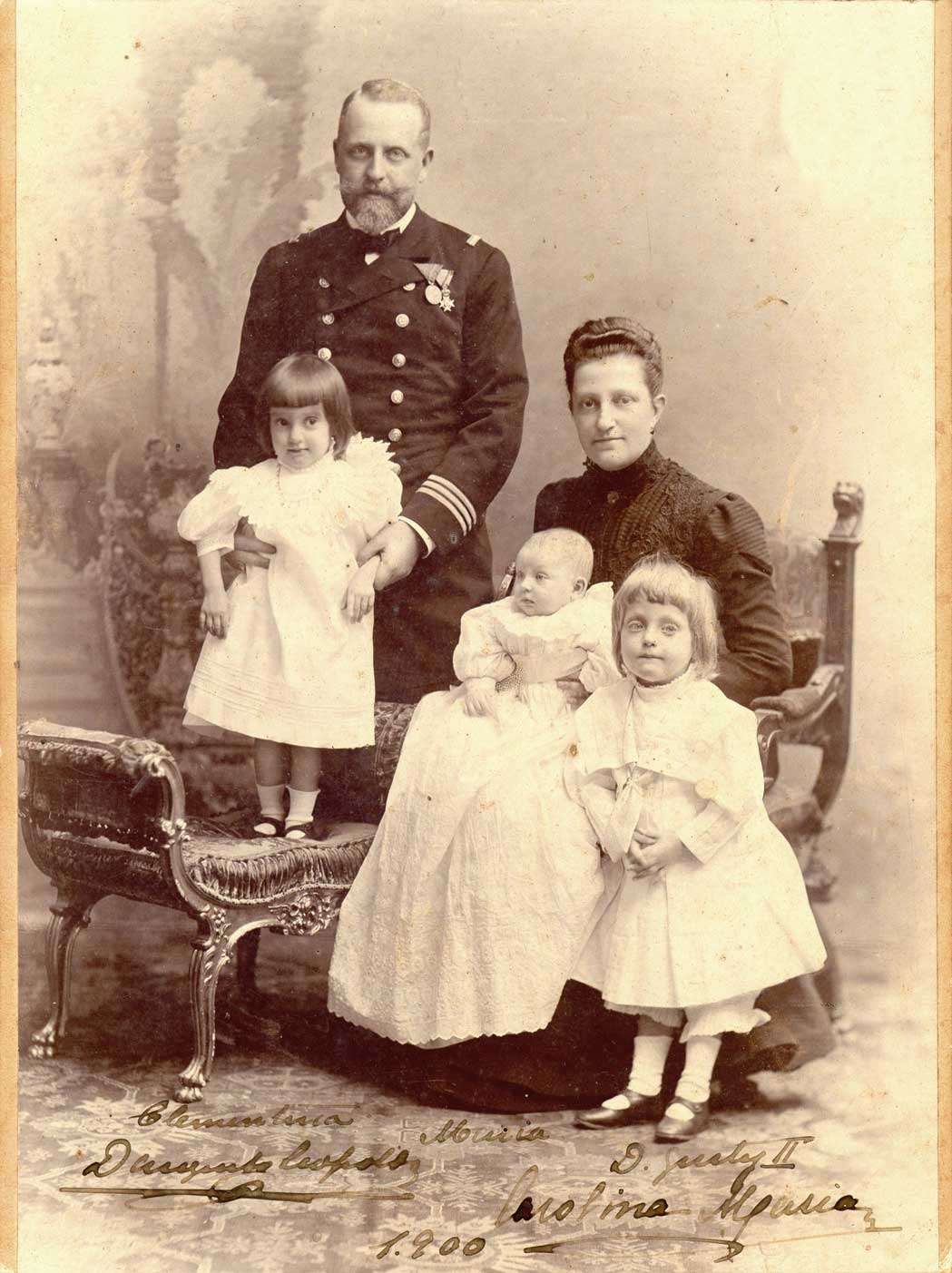
Prince Augusto Leopoldo of Saxe-Coburg and Braganza with his wife, the Archduchess Carolina Maria of Austria-Tuscany, and three of his children (from left): Princess Clementina, Princess Maria and Prince Augustus, c. 1900

In the service of the Austrian Navy (where he obtained the patent of Kapitän zur See, equivalent to sea-captain), Augusto had the opportunity to visit other countries, where he continued to be received with the deference reserved for members of ruling houses. In 1897, on board the coast defence ship SMS Wien, he visited Portugal, where he was received by King Carlos I, and the United Kingdom, where he was received more than once by Queen Victoria.

With the aggravation of his brother's psychiatric problems, the prince came to be contemplated by the Brazilian monarchists to assume the throne of Brazil during the frustrated plans of restoration of the regime. He even participated in a restoration attempt by which he returned to Brazil in 1893, but was prevented from landing on national territory.

=== Marriage and issue ===
On 30 May 1894, August Leopold married Archduchess Karoline Marie of Austria, in Vienna. His bride was the fourth child and second daughter of Archduke Karl Salvator of Austria, Prince of Tuscany, and his wife Princess Maria Immaculata of Bourbon-Two Sicilies. The ceremony was officiated by Anton Josef Gruscha, cardinal-archbishop of Vienna, and was attended by Emperor Franz Joseph I, Empress Elisabeth (widely known as Sissi) and other princes and sovereigns. The couple were the godfathers of King Ferdinand II of the Two Sicilies and Ferdinand IV of Tuscany. The couple had eight children:

- August Clemens Karl Joseph Maria Michael Gabriel Raphael Gonzaga (27 October 1895, Pula – 22 September 1908, Gerasdorf)
- Klementine Maria Teresa Josepha Leopoldine Viktoria Raphaele Gabriele Gonzaga (23 March 1897, Pula – 7 January 1975, Lausanne), married Eduard von Heller on 17 November 1925.
- Maria Karoline Philomena Ignatia Pauline Josepha Michaela Gabriela Raphaela Gonzaga (10 January 1899, Pula – 6 June 1941, Hartheim bei Linz), had been living in an institution for the mentally disabled in Schladming; in 1941, under the Nazi Action T4 euthanasia policy, the patients were removed to the concentration camp of Schloss Hartheim and gassed.
- Rainer Maria Joseph Florian Ignatius Michael Gabriel Raphael Gonzaga (4 May 1900, Pula – after 7 January 1945), believed to have been killed in action at Budapest.
- Philipp Josias Maria Joseph Ignatius Michael Gabriel Raphael Gonzaga (18 August 1901, Walterskirchen – Vienna，18 October 1985), married morganatically on 23 April 1944 to Sarah Aurelia Halasz; their only son and four grandchildren were barred from the succession of the House of Saxe-Coburg-Gotha-Koháry.
- Theresia Christiane Maria Josepha Ignatia Benizia Michaela Gabriele Raphaele Gonzaga (23 August 1902, Walterskirchen – 24 January 1990, Villach), married on 6 October 1930 to Lamoral, Freiherr von Taxis-Bordogna und Valnigra; their descendants assumed the surname Tasso de Saxe-Coburgo e Bragança.
- Leopoldine Blanka Maria Josepha Ignatia Pankrazia Michaela Gabriele Raphaele Gonzaga (13 May 1905, Schloß Gerasdorf – 24 December 1978, Hungary)
- Ernst Franz Maria Joseph Ignatius Thaddeus Felix Michael Gabriel Raphael Gonzaga (25 February 1907, Gerasdorf – 9 June 1978, Gröbming, Styria), married morganatically on 4 September 1939 to Irmgard Röll. This marriage was childless.

=== Last years ===
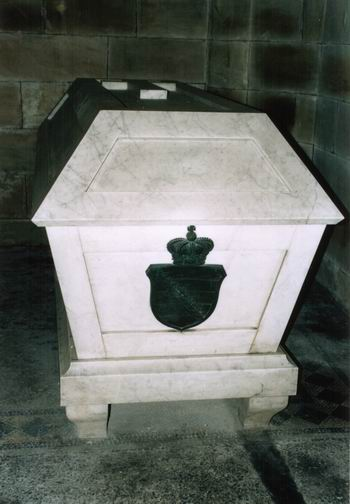
Tomb of Prince Augusto Leopoldo in Coburg

In his last years, Dom Augusto acquired his paternal family's soft spot for art collections, happening to collect works done in ivory. He never fully adapted to life in Europe, continuing to maintain close relationships with other Brazilians. Gerasdorf Castle, his residence on the outskirts of Vienna, was decorated with objects and photos of Brazil.

The repeal of the Law of Banishment, which prevented the landing of any member of the old ruling family in Brazil, brought to the prince great joy and hope to revisit the native land. He was preparing to return to the country with the whole family for the celebrations of the centenary of the Independence of Brazil in 1922, but fell seriously ill and could not make the dream trip.

Dom Augusto Leopoldo died in Schladming, Austria on 11 October 1922, at the age of 54. His body was buried in the crypt of St. Augustinkirche, in Coburg.

== Titles and honors ==
Styles of Prince Augusto Leopoldo
- Reference style: His Highness
- Spoken style: Your Highness

=== Titles and styles ===
- 6 December 1867 – 11 October 1922: His Highness Prince Augusto Leopoldo of Brazil, Prince of Saxe-Coburg and Gotha, Duke of Saxony

=== Honors ===
Prince Augusto Leopoldo was a recipient of the following orders:

Brazilian honours

- Grand Cross of the Order of the Southern Cross
- Grand Cross of the Order of Pedro I
- Grand Cross of the Order of the Rose

Foreign honours

- Grand Cross of the Order of the Tower and Sword, 5 February 1903
- Grand Cross of the Order of Leopold
- Grand Cross of the Saxe-Ernestine House Order
- Grand Cross of the Legion of Honour
- Grand Cross of the Order of St. Alexander

== Ancestry ==
Ancestors of Prince August Leopold of Saxe-Coburg and Gotha

8. Prince Ferdinand of Saxe-Coburg and Gotha
4. Prince August of Saxe-Coburg and Gotha
9. Princess Maria Antonia Koháry of Csábrág and Szitnya
2. Prince Ludwig August of Saxe-Coburg and Gotha
10. Louis Philippe I of France
5. Princess Clémentine of Orléans
11. Princess Maria Amalia of Naples and Sicily
1. Prince August Leopold of Saxe-Coburg and Gotha
12. Pedro I of Brazil and IV of Portugal
6. Pedro II of Brazil
13. Archduchess Leopoldina of Austria
3. Princess Leopoldina of Brazil
14. Francis I of the Two Sicilies
7. Princess Teresa Cristina of the Two Sicilies
15. Infanta Maria Isabella of Spain

== Sources ==
- Defrance O., "These Princes who came from Brazil" in Royalty Digest Quarterly n°2 - 2012, pp. 1–13.
- Almanak Administrativo, Mercantil e Industrial do Império do Brazil para 1889 - 46º Anno
- Bragança, Dom Carlos Tasso de Saxe-Coburgo e. A Princesa Leopoldina, in Revista do Instituto Historico e Geografico Brasileiro, vol. 243, 1959, pp. 70–93 (ISSN 0101-4366)
- Bragança, Dom Carlos Tasso de Saxe-Coburgo e. Vultos do Brasil Imperial na Ordem Ernestina da Saxônia, in Anais do Museu Histórico Nacional, volume XII, 1951, p. 88
- Bragança, Dom Carlos Tasso de Saxe-Coburgo e. Palácio Leopoldina, in Revista do Instituto Histórico e Geográfico Brasileiro, vol. 438, 2008, pp. 281–303 (ISSN 0101-4366)
- Defrance, Olivier. La Médicis des Cobourg, Clémentine d’Orléans, Bruxelles, Racine, 2007 (ISBN 2873864869)
- Defrance O., "These Princes who came from Brazil" in Royalty Digest Quarterly n°2 - 2012, pp. 1–13.
- Del Priore, Mary. O Príncipe Maldito, Rio de Janeiro, Objetiva, 2007 (ISBN 857302867X)
- Lessa, Clado Ribeiro de. O Segundo Ramo da Casa Imperial e a nossa Marinha de Guerra, in Revista do Instituto Historico e Geografico Brasileiro, vol. 211, 1951, pp. 118–133 (ISSN 0101-4366)
- Lyra, Heitor. História de Dom Pedro II - Declínio (1880-1891), Belo Horizonte, Itatiaia; São Paulo, Ed. da Universidade de São Paulo, 1977, p. 37, 145, 173 (ISBN 9788531903571)
- Sessão Imperial da abertura da 2ª sessão da 13ª legislatura, in Annaes do Senado do Império do Brasil, Segunda Sessão em 1868 da 13ª Legislatura, de 27 de abril a 30 de maio, volume I, pp. 28–30
- Vinholes, L.C. Intercâmbio Cultural e Artístico nas relações Brasil-Japão - Centenário do Tratado de Amizade, de Comércio e Navegação 05.11.1895 - 05.11.1995. in Revista Iberoamericana nº 33, Vol. XVII, nº 2, Instituto Iberoamericano da Universidade Sofia, Tóquio, 1995, pp. 17–36
- Wehrs, Carlos. A Princesa Leopoldina de Bragança e Bourbon e a Casa Ducal de Saxe-Coburg, in Revista do Instituto Historico e Geografico Brasileiro, vol. 437, 2007, pp. 275–289 (ISSN 0101-4366)
