= Princess Maria Immacolata of the Two Sicilies =

Archduchess Karl Salvator of Austria (1844–1899)

Archduchess Maria Immaculata
- Archduchess Karl Salvator of Austria
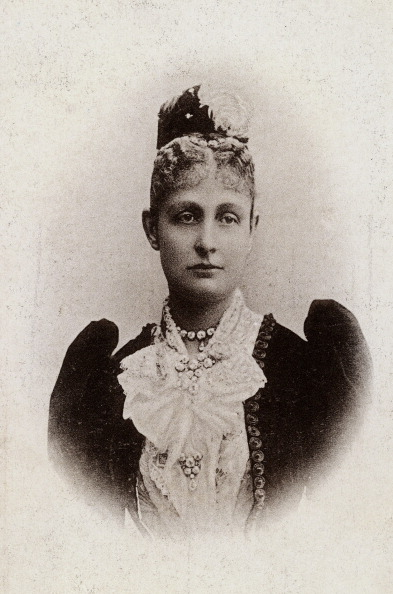
- Maria Immaculata in the 1880s
- Born: 14 April 1844; Naples, Kingdom of the Two Sicilies
- Died: 18 February 1899 (aged 54); Vienna, Empire of Austria
- Burial: Ferdinand's Vault, Imperial Crypt, Capuchin Church, Vienna, Austria
- Spouse: Archduke Karl Salvator of Austria (m. 1861; died 1892)
- Issue: Archduchess Maria Theresa; Archduke Leopold Salvator; Archduke Franz Salvator; Karoline Marie, Princess of Saxe-Coburg and Gotha; Archduke Albrecht Salvator; Archduchess Maria Antonia; Maria Immaculata, Duchess of Württemberg; Archduke Rainier Salvator; Archduchess Henrietta Maria; Archduke Ferdinand Salvator
Names
- Italian: Maria Immacolata Clementina
- House: Bourbon-Two Sicilies
- Father: King Ferdinand II of the Two Sicilies
- Mother: Archduchess Maria Theresa of Austria

Princess Maria Immaculata of the Two Sicilies (Full Italian name: Maria Immaculata Clementina, Principessa di Borbone delle Due Sicilie) (14 April 1844, Naples, Kingdom of the Two Sicilies – 18 February 1899, Vienna, Austria) was the fifth child and second-eldest daughter of Ferdinand II of the Two Sicilies and Maria Theresa of Austria. Through her marriage to Archduke Karl Salvator of Austria, Maria Immaculata became an Austrian archduchess.

== Early life ==
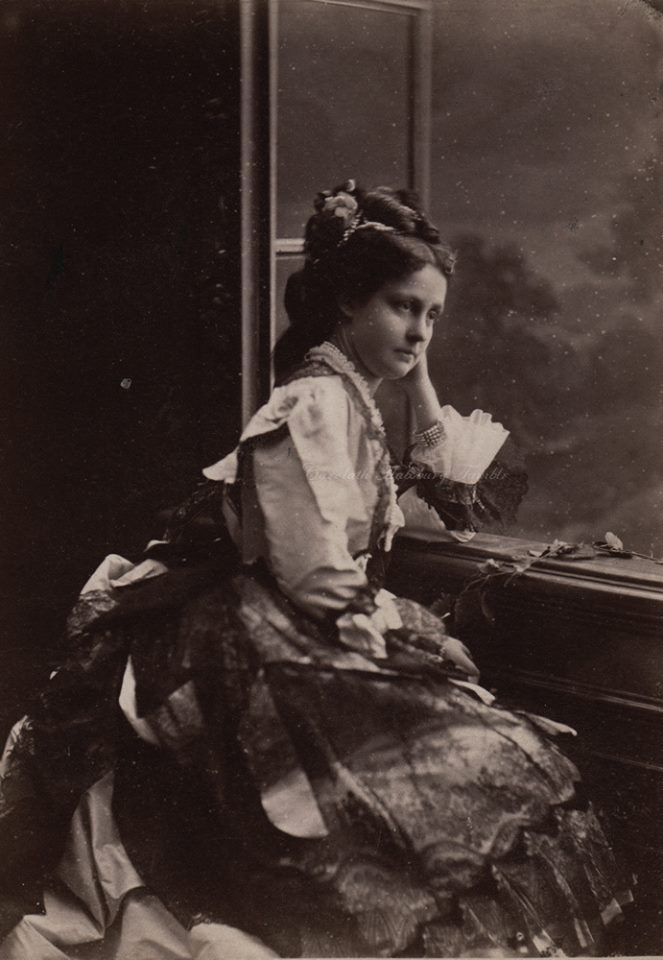
Archduchess Maria Immaculata of Austria-Tuscany, 1874.

Maria Immaculata was modest and reserved growing up and was jokingly called by her father "Petitta." Her mother, Maria Theresa, detested parties and court life and instead, she devoted herself to the care of her children and sewing.

After the fall of the Kingdom of the Two Sicilies during the Expedition of the Thousand, the royal family fled to Rome where they resided at the Quirinal Palace at the invitation of the Pope Pius IX.

== Marriage and family ==
Maria Immaculata married Archduke Karl Salvator of Austria, fifth child and second-eldest son of Leopold II, Grand Duke of Tuscany and his wife Princess Maria Antonia of the Two Sicilies, on 19 September 1861 in Rome.

The family spent two or three summers in Baden, so that Karl Salvator could go to the sulfur baths. Both Maria and Karl Salvator became popular with local citizens. In late September 1878, after Maria gave birth to a daughter in Baden, Emperor Ferdinand himself visited to attend the christening of Maria Immaculata Raineria; the archduchess was congratulated with a torchlight procession and presented a large bouquet of flowers by mayor of Baden Count Christalnigg.

== Issue ==
Maria Immaculata and Karl Salvator had ten children:

- Archduchess Maria Theresia (Alt-Bunzlau, 18 September 1862 – Saybusch, 10 May 1933), married in Vienna on 28 February 1886 Archduke Charles Stephen of Austria (Gross-Seelowitz, 5 September 1860 – Saybusch, 7 April 1933)
- Archduke Leopold Salvator (Alt-Bunzlau, Bohemia, 15 October 1863 – Vienna, 4 September 1931), married in Frohsdorf on 24 October 1889 Princess Blanca of Bourbon (Graz, 7 September 1868 – Viareggio, 25 October 1949), and had issue
- Archduke Franz Salvator (Alt-Münster, 21 August 1866 – Vienna, 20 April 1939), married firstly in Ischl on 31 July 1890 Archduchess Marie Valerie of Austria (Ofen, 22 April 1868 – Schloss Wallsee, 6 September 1924), and had issue, and married secondly morganatically in Vienna on 28 April 1934 Melanie Freiin von Riesenfels (Seisenegg, Lower Austria, 20 September 1898 – Amstetten, 10 November 1984), without issue
- Archduchess Karoline Marie (Alt-Münster, 5 September 1869 – Budapest, 12 May 1945), married in Vienna on 30 May 1894 Prince August Leopold of Saxe-Coburg and Gotha (Rio de Janeiro, Rio de Janeiro, 6 December 1867 – Schladming, 11 October 1922)
- Archduke Albrecht Salvator (Alt-Bunzlau, 22 November 1871 – Bolzano, 27 February 1896), unmarried and without issue
- Archduchess Maria Antonia (Vienna, 18 April 1874 – Arco, 14 January 1891)
- Archduchess Maria Immaculata (Baden bei Wien, 3 September 1878 – Schloss Altshausen, 25 November 1968), married in Vienna on 29 October 1900 Duke Robert of Württemberg (Meran, 14 January 1873 – Schloss Altshausen, 12 April 1947)
- Archduke Rainer Salvator (Vienna, 27 February 1880 – Arco, 4 May 1889)
- Archduchess Henrietta Maria (Vienna, 20 February 1884 – Traunkirchen, 13 August 1886)
- Archduke Ferdinand Salvator (Baden bei Wien, 2 June 1888 – Traunkirchen, 28 July 1891)

== Later life ==
Maria Immaculata was known for her beauty. She was included in Empress Elisabeth of Austria's photo album of beautiful women. Because Maria Immaculata's husband gave her a pearl necklace each time she bore another child, Empress Elisabeth mockingly nicknamed the family "The Pearl Divers". Eventually, Empress Elisabeth's youngest daughter Archduchess Marie Valerie married Maria Immaculata's son Franz Salvator.

== Ancestry ==
Ancestors of Princess Maria Immacolata of the Two Sicilies

8. Ferdinand I of the Two Sicilies
4. Francis I of the Two Sicilies
9. Archduchess Maria Carolina of Austria
2. Ferdinand II of the Two Sicilies
10. Charles IV of Spain
5. Infanta Maria Isabella of Spain
11. Princess Maria Luisa of Parma
1. Princess Maria Immaculata of Bourbon-Two Sicilies
12. Leopold II, Holy Roman Emperor
6. Archduke Charles, Duke of Teschen
13. Infanta Maria Louisa of Spain
3. Archduchess Maria Theresa of Austria
14. Frederick William, Prince of Nassau-Weilburg
7. Princess Henrietta of Nassau-Weilburg
15. Burgravine Louise Isabelle of Kirchberg
