= Traunkirchen =

- Municipality
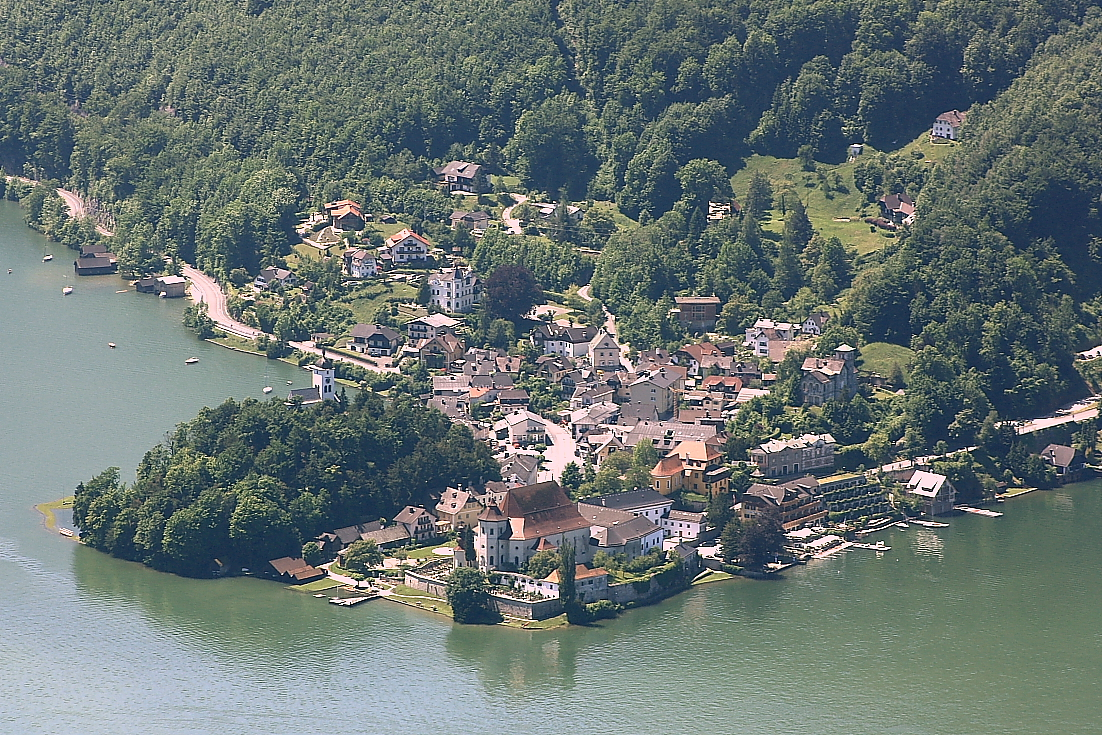

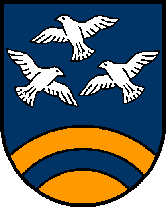
- Coat of arms

- Location within Austria
- Coordinates: 47°50′45″N 13°47′39″E
- Country: Austria
- State: Upper Austria
- District: Gmunden

Government
  - Mayor: Christoph Schragl (ÖVP)

Area
  - Total: 18.36 km^{2} (7.09 sq mi)
- Elevation: 422 m (1,385 ft)

Population (2018-01-01)
  - Total: 1,624
  - Density: 88.45/km^{2} (229.1/sq mi)
- Time zone: UTC+1 (CET)
  - Summer (DST): UTC+2 (CEST)
- Postal code: 4801
- Area code: 07617
- Vehicle registration: GM
- Website: www.traunkirchen.at

Traunkirchen (German: [ˌtʁaʊ̯nˌkiʁçn̩]) is a municipality on the Traunsee in the Austrian state of Upper Austria, Austria.

== Tourism ==
The lake and the mountains provide opportunities for outdoor activities like hiking, sailing, diving, skiing, swimming, and surfing. The village is known for the Fischerkanzel (Fisherman's Pulpit), located in the parish church, which was carved in 1753.

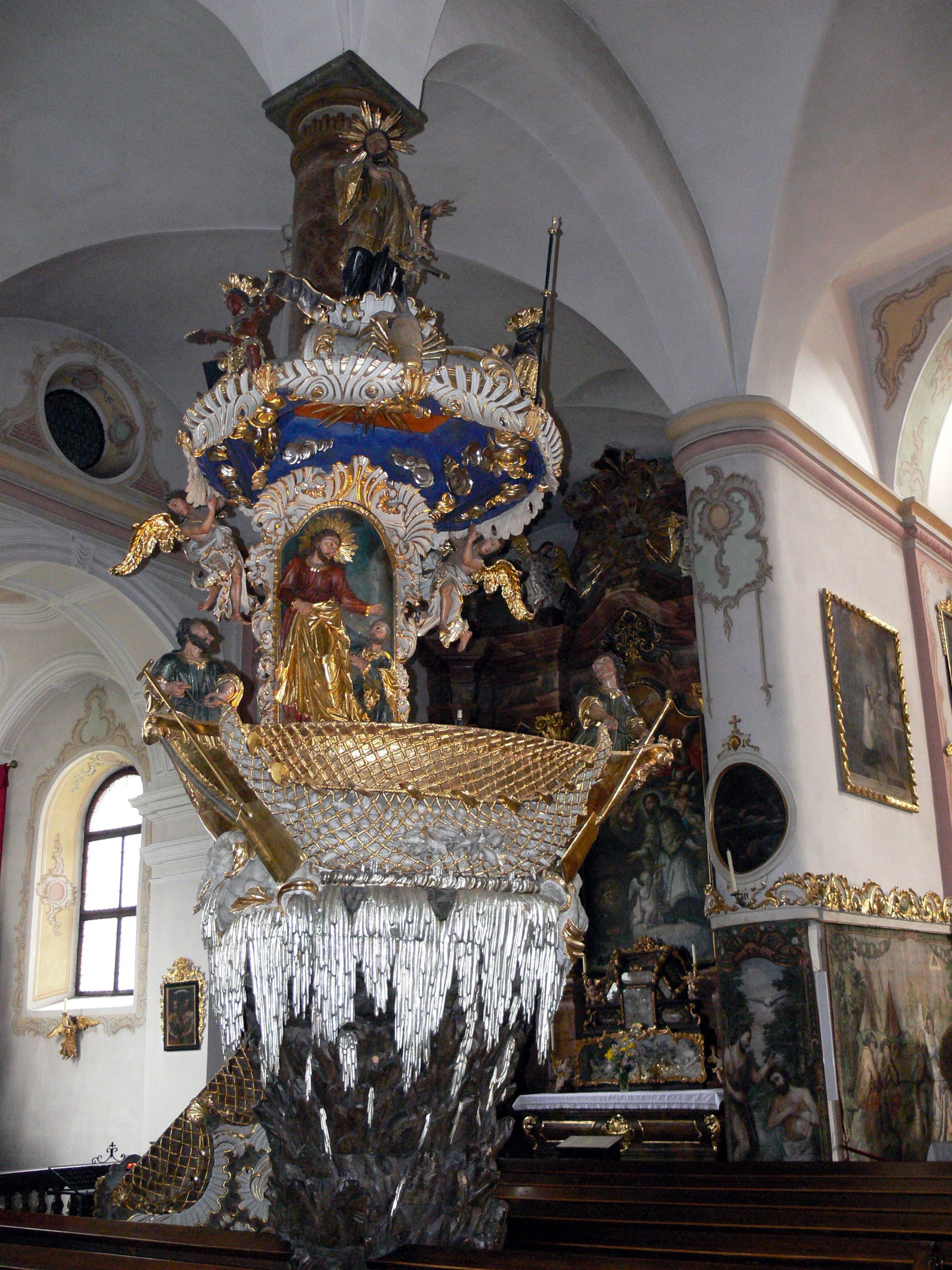
Fischerkanzel

== Population ==
Historical population
Year	Pop.	±%
1991	1,742	—
2001	1,745	+0.2%
2004	1,761	+0.9%
2014	1,621	−8.0%
2016	1,623	+0.1%
