= Archduchess Karoline Marie of Austria =

Austrian archduchess

Archduchess Karoline Marie
- Princess August Leopold of Saxe-Coburg and Gotha
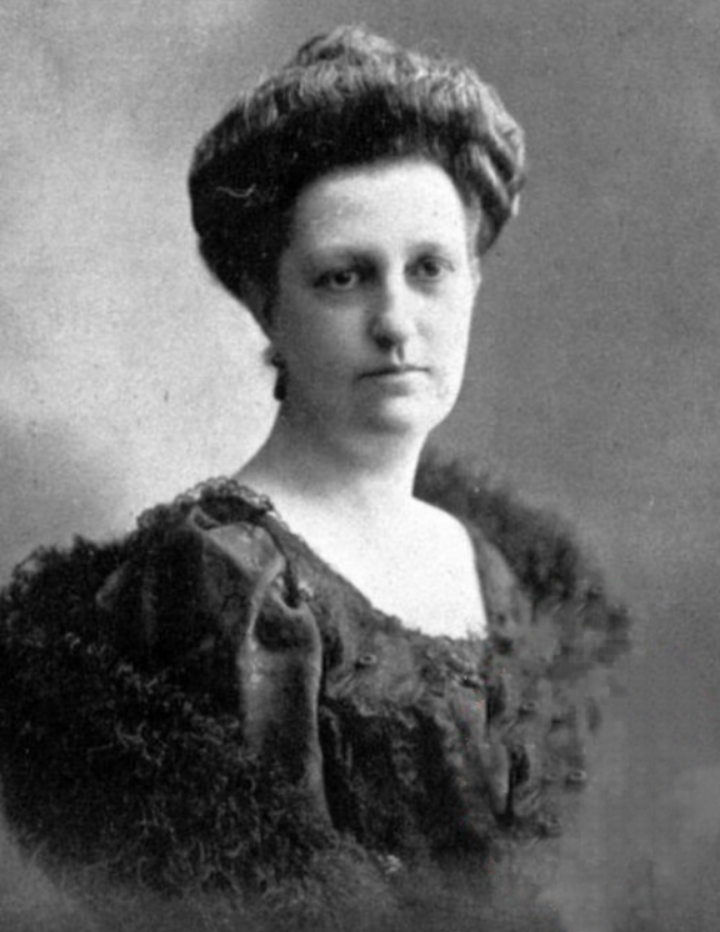
- Karoline Marie c. 1900s
- Born: 5 September 1869; Altmünster, Austria-Hungary
- Died: 12 May 1945 (aged 75); Budapest, Kingdom of Hungary
- Spouse: Prince August Leopold of Saxe-Coburg and Gotha (m. 1894; died 1922)
- Issue: Prince August; Princess Klementine; Princess Maria Karoline; Prince Rainer; Prince Philipp; Princess Theresia; Princess Leopoldine; Prince Franz
Names
- German: Carolina Maria Immakulata Josepha Ferdinanda Therese Leopoldine Antoinette Franziska Isabella Luise Januaria Christine Benedikta Laurencia Justiniana
- House: Habsburg-Tuscany
- Father: Archduke Karl Salvator of Austria
- Mother: Princess Maria Immaculata of Bourbon-Two Sicilies

Archduchess Karoline Marie of Austria (German: Caroline Marie Immakulata Josepha Ferdinanda Therese Leopoldine Antoinette Franziska Isabella Luise Januaria Christine Benedikta Laurencia Justiniana, Erzherzogin von Österreich, Prinzessin von Toskana) (5 September 1869 – 12 May 1945) was a member of the House of Habsburg-Tuscany and Archduchess of Austria, Princess of Tuscany by birth. Through her marriage to Prince August Leopold of Saxe-Coburg and Gotha, Karoline was also a member of the Koháry branch of the House of Saxe-Coburg and Gotha. Karoline was the fourth child and second eldest daughter of Archduke Karl Salvator of Austria and his wife Princess Maria Immaculata of Bourbon-Two Sicilies. She was Princess-Abbess of the Theresian Royal and Imperial Ladies Chapter of the Castle of Prague (1893-1894).

== Marriage and issue ==
Karoline married Prince August Leopold of Saxe-Coburg and Gotha, second eldest son of Prince Ludwig August of Saxe-Coburg and Gotha and his wife Princess Leopoldina of Brazil, on 30 May 1894 in Vienna. Karoline and August had eight children together:

1. August Clemens (b. Pola, 27 October 1895 – d. Gerasdorf, 22 September 1908).
2. Klementine Maria (b. Pola, 23 March 1897 – d. Lausanne, 7 January 1975), married on 17 November 1925 to Eduard von Heller.
3. Maria Karoline (b. Pola, 10 January 1899 – d. Hartheim bei Linz, 6 June 1941). She had been living in an institution for mentally disabled people in Schladming, but was taken away and executed by gassing along with her fellow patients as a result of the Nazi eugenics policy, Action T4, in the concentration camp at Schloss Hartheim. As a great-granddaughter of Emperor Pedro II of Brazil, she is commemorated in the Holocaust memorial at Rio de Janeiro.
4. Rainer (b. Pola, 4 May 1900 – d. after 7 January 1945 {believed to have been killed in action at Budapest}). Married twice and had issue by first marriage.
5. Philipp (b. Walterskirchen, 18 August 1901 – d. 18 October 1985), married morganatically on 23 April 1944 to Sarah Aurelia Hálasz; their only son and their four grandchildren were barred from the succession of the House of Saxe-Coburg-Kohary.
6. Theresia (b. Walterskirchen, 23 August 1902 – d. Villach, 24 January 1990), married on 6 October 1930 to Lamoral, Freiherr von Taxis di Bordogna e Valnigra (Their descendants bore the surname Tasso de Saxe-Coburgo e Bragança).
7. Leopoldine Blanka (b. Schloß Gerasdorf, 13 May 1905 – d. Hungary, 24 December 1978).
8. Ernst Franz (b. Gerasdorf, 25 February 1907 – d. Gröbming, Styria, 9 June 1978), married morganatically on 4 September 1939 to Irmgard Röll. This marriage was childless.

== Ancestry ==
Ancestors of Archduchess Karoline Marie of Austria

8. Ferdinand III, Grand Duke of Tuscany
4. Leopold II, Grand Duke of Tuscany
9. Princess Luisa of Naples and Sicily
2. Archduke Karl Salvator of Austria
10. Francis I of the Two Sicilies
5. Princess Maria Antonia of the Two Sicilies
11. Infanta Maria Isabella of Spain
1. Archduchess Karoline Marie of Austria
12. Francis I of the Two Sicilies (= 10)
6. Ferdinand II of the Two Sicilies
13. Infanta Maria Isabella of Spain (= 11)
3. Princess Maria Immacolata of Bourbon-Two Sicilies
14. Archduke Charles, Duke of Teschen
7. Archduchess Maria Theresa of Austria
15. Princess Henrietta of Nassau-Weilburg
