= Altmünster =

Altmünster Oidmünsta
- Municipality
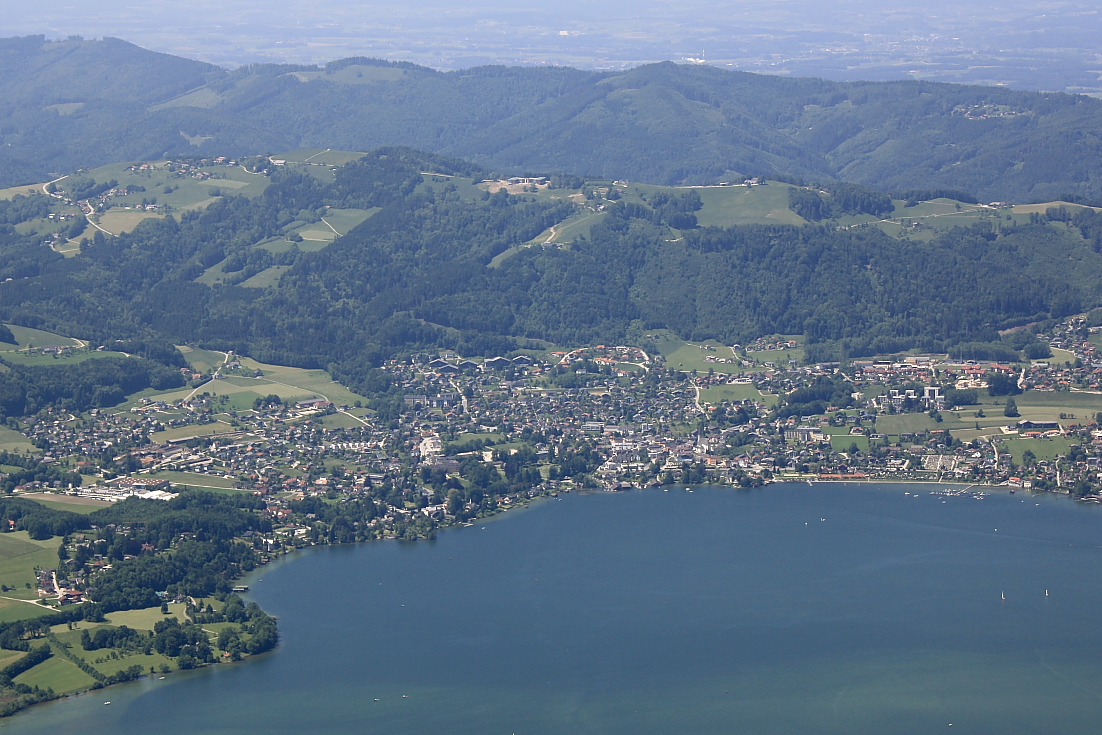

- Coat of arms

- Location within Austria
- Coordinates: 47°54′05″N 13°45′05″E
- Country: Austria
- State: Upper Austria
- District: Gmunden

Government
  - Mayor: Martin Pelzer (ÖVP)

Area
  - Total: 78.93 km^{2} (30.48 sq mi)
- Elevation: 442 m (1,450 ft)

Population (2018-01-01)
  - Total: 9,793
  - Density: 124.1/km^{2} (321.3/sq mi)
- Time zone: UTC+1 (CET)
  - Summer (DST): UTC+2 (CEST)
- Postal code: 4813
- Area code: 07612
- Vehicle registration: GM
- Website: www.altmuenster.at

Altmünster (German pronunciation: [ˈaltˌmʏnstɐ]; In the local dialect: Oidmünsta), also known as Altmünster am Traunsee, is a market town located about 3 kilometres south of Gmunden in the Austrian state of Upper Austria, on the west shore of the Traunsee. Its economic base consists primarily of tourism, light industry, and as a bedroom community for people working in larger communities such as Gmunden and Vöcklabruck.

== Population ==
Historical population
Year	Pop.	±%
1869	4,778	—
1880	4,683	−2.0%
1890	4,742	+1.3%
1900	4,951	+4.4%
1910	5,244	+5.9%
1923	5,329	+1.6%
1934	5,917	+11.0%
1939	6,328	+6.9%
1951	7,383	+16.7%
1961	7,348	−0.5%
1971	7,921	+7.8%
1981	8,556	+8.0%
1991	9,067	+6.0%
2001	9,445	+4.2%
2016	9,785	+3.6%

== International relations ==
=== Twin towns — Sister cities ===
Altmünster is twinned with:

- Düren, Germany
- Hoegaarden, Belgium

== Notable residents ==
- Franz Stangl (1908-1971), Austrian-born Nazi SS concentration camp commandant

=== Aristocracy ===
- Archduke Ferdinand Karl Joseph of Austria-Este (1781–1850), commanded the Austrian army during the Napoleonic Wars, died locally
- Archduke Franz Salvator of Austria (1866–1939), member of the House of Habsburg
- Archduchess Karoline Marie of Austria (1869–1945), member of the House of Habsburg-Tuscany and Archduchess of Austria
