= Princess Louise of Belgium =

Princess Philipp of Saxe-Coburg and Gotha (1858–1924)

Louise of Belgium
- Princess Philipp of Saxe-Coburg and Gotha
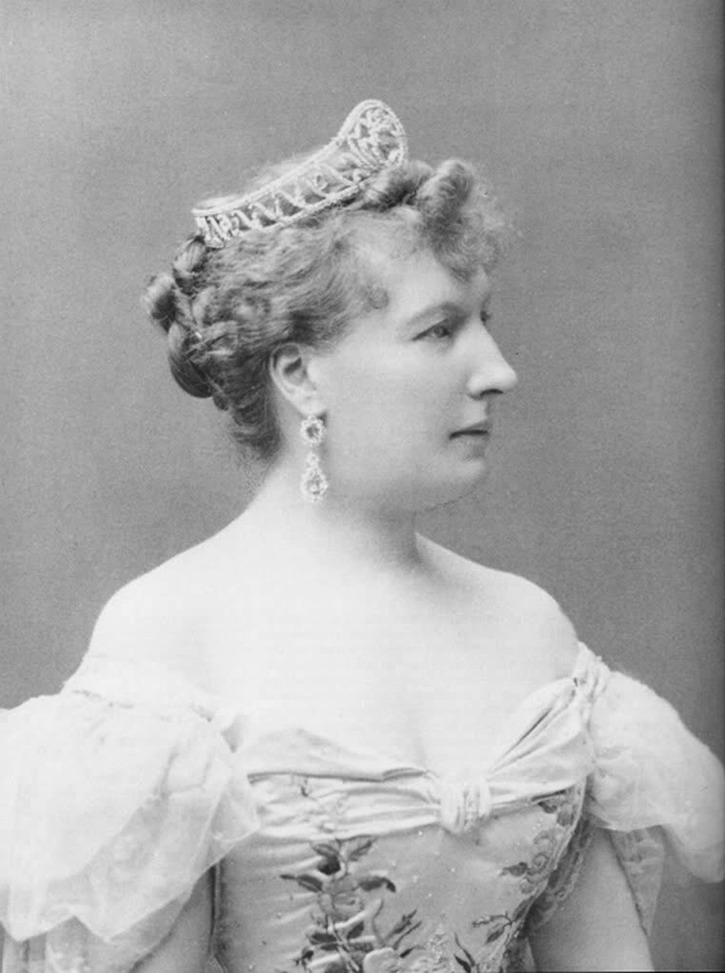
- Princess Louise, ca. 1894
- Born: 18 February 1858; Royal Palace, Brussels, Belgium
- Died: 1 March 1924 (aged 66); Hotel Nassauer Hof, Wiesbaden, Germany
- Burial: South Cemetery Wiesbaden
- Spouse: Prince Philipp of Saxe-Coburg and Gotha (m. 1875; div. 1906)
- Issue: Prince Leopold Clement; Dorothea, Duchess of Schleswig-Holstein
Names
- Louise Marie Amélie
- House: Saxe-Coburg and Gotha
- Father: Leopold II of Belgium
- Mother: Marie Henriette of Austria

Princess Louise Marie Amélie of Belgium (18 February 1858 – 1 March 1924) was the eldest child and daughter of King Leopold II and Queen Marie Henriette of Belgium. She was a member of the House of Saxe-Coburg and Gotha, a branch of the House of Wettin which ruled in the Kingdom of Saxony. By her marriage to her first cousin once removed Prince Philipp of Saxe-Coburg and Gotha, she retained her birth titles of Princess of Saxe-Coburg and Gotha and Duchess in Saxony.

Louise was born during the reign of her paternal grandfather, Leopold I of Belgium, and was named after her paternal grandmother Queen Louise. She married in Brussels on 4 February 1875 her first cousin once removed Prince Philipp. Louise and Philipp settled in Vienna, where they had two children: Leopold Clement, born in 1878, and Dorothea, born in 1881.

Louise's marriage quickly fell apart. Endowed with a strong and whole personality, she refused to submit to a husband who did not suit her, who had been imposed for reasons of state. She reacted by leading a lavish and worldly life as a beauty in the court of Vienna. Louise was quickly preceded by a reputation for scandal to which she gave credit by engaging in several successive affairs before falling in love with Geza Mattachich, an officer and member of the Croatian nobility, whose mother Anna Kuchtich de Oskocz (b. 1847) was married secondly to Count Oskar Keglevich of Buzin (1839-1918), politician and MP of Croatian Sabor. Europe was scandalized when her husband had Louise declared insane and convinced the Emperor Franz Joseph I of Austria to intern her in a psychiatric hospital, while Mattachich was accused of forgery and imprisoned. Released four years later, Mattachich succeeded in helping the princess escape. Both then traveled across Europe. After succeeding in proving her mental balance, Louise divorced amicably in 1906.

Louise began the life of a stateless person. Together with her sister Stéphanie, she filed several lawsuits, which were ultimately unsuccessful, against the Belgian State to recover the inheritance of their father, who had died in 1909. However, in 1914, she managed to receive a part of King Leopold II's fortune. World War I and the German defeat further impoverished Louise, who decided to publish her memoirs under the title Autour des trônes que j'ai vu tomber (Around the thrones that I saw fall) which also constitute a testimony of the life of the European courts. Prince Philippe, her ex-husband, died in 1921. In 1924, at the age of 66, Louise died in poverty, a year after her lover Mattachich. Her only surviving offspring was her daughter Dorothea, whom she no longer saw. The major memory she leaves in Belgium is the Avenue Louise in Brussels, named after her.

== Life ==
=== Early years ===
==== A long-awaited birth ====
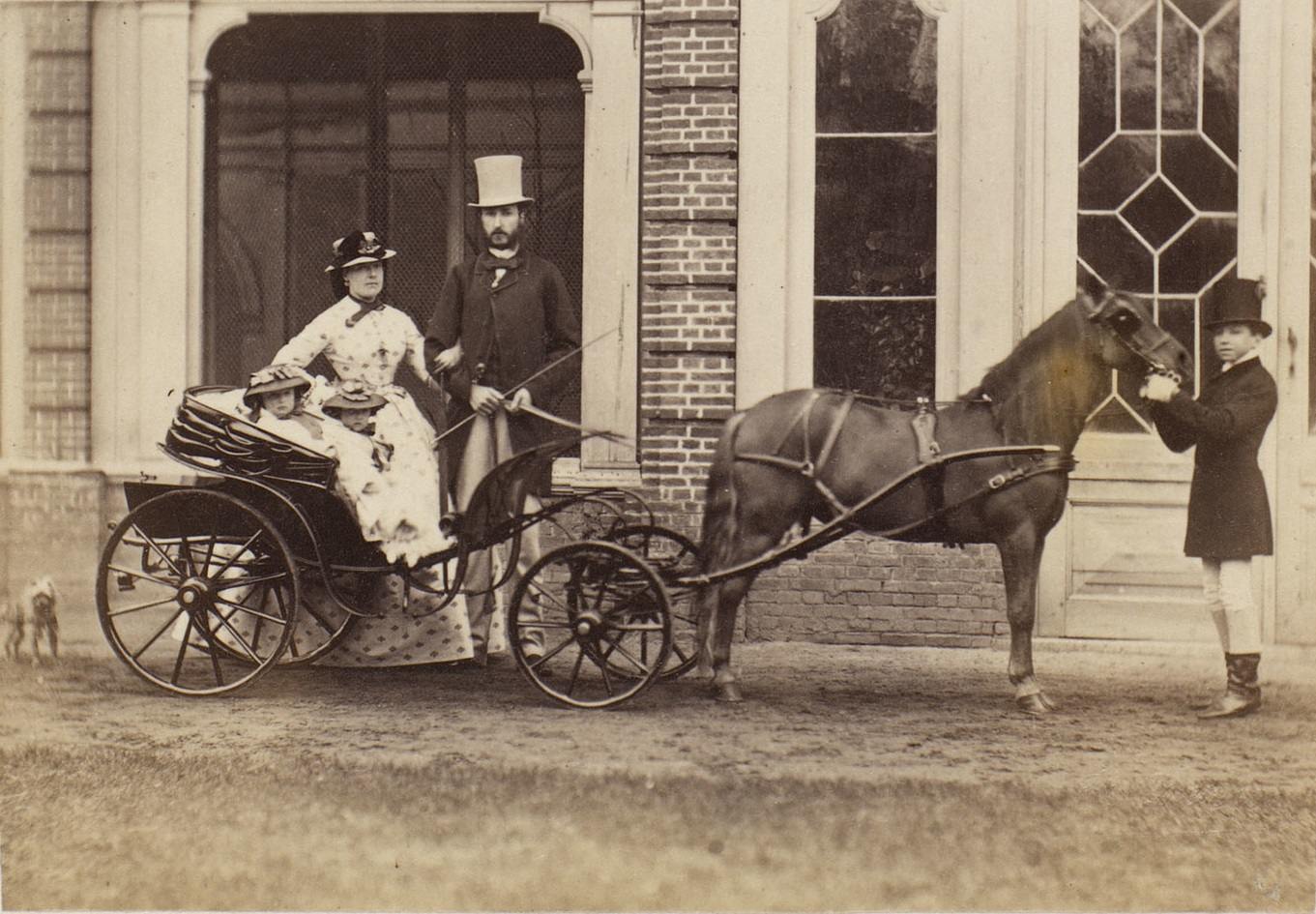
The Duke and Duchess of Brabant and their two older children Louise and Leopold, Count of Hainaut. Photography by François Deron, 1862.

Granddaughter of King Leopold I of Belgium, Princess Louise was the first child of the Duke (future King Leopold II) and Duchess of Brabant (born Archduchess Marie Henriette of Austria), an unhappy and mismatched couple. In 1853, their marriage had been decided with the purpose of cementing alliance with the Kingdom of Belgium by both King Leopold I and the Habsburgs, without consulting the groom and bride, whose interests were almost everything opposite: The Duke of Brabant was hardly attracted by family life and was passionate about the politics and economy of the Kingdom which he was about to reign, while Marie Henriette was a young woman versed in religion and interests limited to horseback riding, dogs and music.

It was only after four years that Marie Henriette became pregnant for the first time; a girl was born on 18 February 1858 at the Royal Palace of Brussels. The parents were disappointed as a daughter could not succeed to the throne, leaving the future of the dynasty not guaranteed.

The princess was baptised as Louise Marie Amélie on 28 March; her godparents were her great-uncle Archduke John of Austria and her great-grandmother, Maria Amalia, Dowager Queen consort of the French, who since the Revolution of 1848 lived in exile in Great Britain. Because she was too old to go to Belgium for the baptism, Maria Amalia expressed the wish that her goddaughter would receive the first name of the first Queen of the Belgians, her eldest and beloved daughter, who had died prematurely.

Louise was described by her father in this way: "[She] is very wise, her face is already white and pink like her mother's. King Leopold I find it very pretty, I hope it will one day, but for now, I note only that it has large dark eyes and alas! a huge nose, worthy of mine in every way". A brother, Leopold, was born on 12 June 1859 and titled Count of Hainaut as the eldest son of the Duke of Brabant, and whose birth seemed to ensure the sustainability of the recently established Belgian royal house. A younger sister, Stéphanie, was born on 21 May 1864.

==== Under the new reign ====
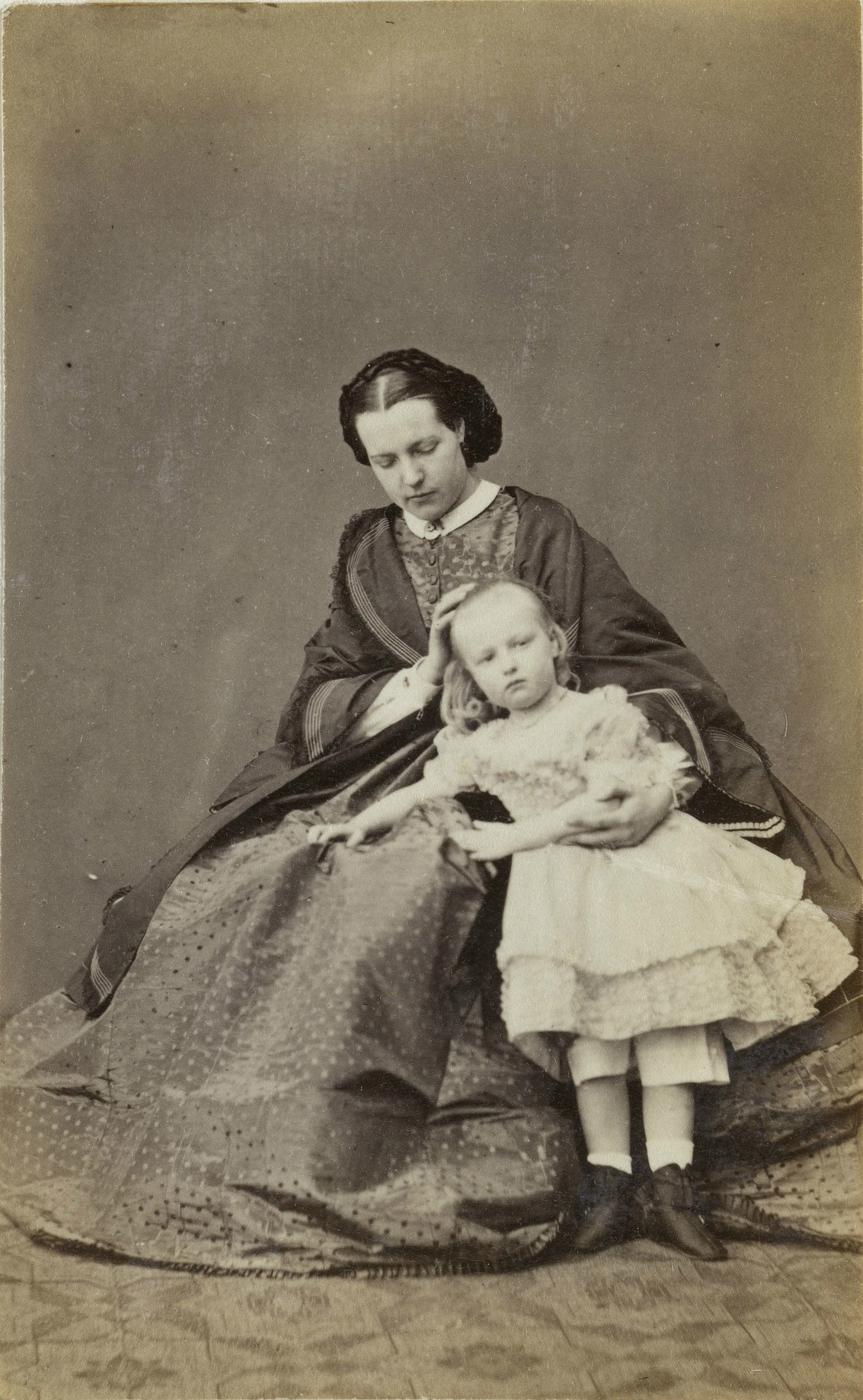
Marie Henriette, Duchess of Brabant and her daughter Louise. Photography by Louis-Joseph Ghémar, 1863.

On 10 December 1865 King Leopold I, founder of the Belgian dynasty, died after a reign of 34 years. His son ascended to the throne under the name of Leopold II. For Louise and Leopold, aged 7 and 6 respectively, this new situation would bring about some changes in their daily life. The Count of Hainaut became the heir to the throne and was raised to the title of Duke of Brabant. Louise and her brother, until now under the direction of a governess, Miss Legrand, were now endowed with a governor: Count Ignace van der Straten-Ponthoz, major of artillery, assisted in his functions by Albert Donny, a young artilleryman. The two men entered the service of the King's children on 4 March 1866. Louise and her brother preferred Donny and nicknamed van der Straten-Ponthoz the "scolding count" (comte grondeur). Louise had a wilful character, even difficult.

Louise befriended some of the cousins of her age who made a few stays at the Laeken estate: Blanche of Orléans (daughter of the Duke of Nemours), Maria Christina of Austria (future Queen of Spain), and even Beatrice of Great Britain (youngest daughter of Queen Victoria). When they were separated, Louise wrote short letters to them, pretexts for her calligraphy exercises.

From the time she was 6 years old, Louise had benefited from home schooling from teachers who provided her with various courses: French, English, German and Italian languages, and lessons in mathematics, horse riding, history, religion and music. However, the level of education of the princesses was not very high: "The programs lacked scope. In the severe decor of the study room, it was usually too rudimentary that we applied ourselves to history, geography, literature, mathematics; a preponderant place being left to the decorative arts: painting, drawing, music, as well as needlework".

If the school programs were incomplete, discipline was held in high esteem, as Louise relates: "Our mother raised us, my sisters and I, in the English way. Our rooms looked more like convent cells than princely apartments [...] The Queen taught me, from a young age, to be able to do without servants". As for Leopold II, she wrote: "The man I see again when I think of the King is always the one whose silence frightened my childhood [...] The King hardly took care of my sisters and me. His caresses were rare and brief. We were, in front of him, always impressed. He seemed to us much more a King than a father".

==== A family and dynastic tragedy ====
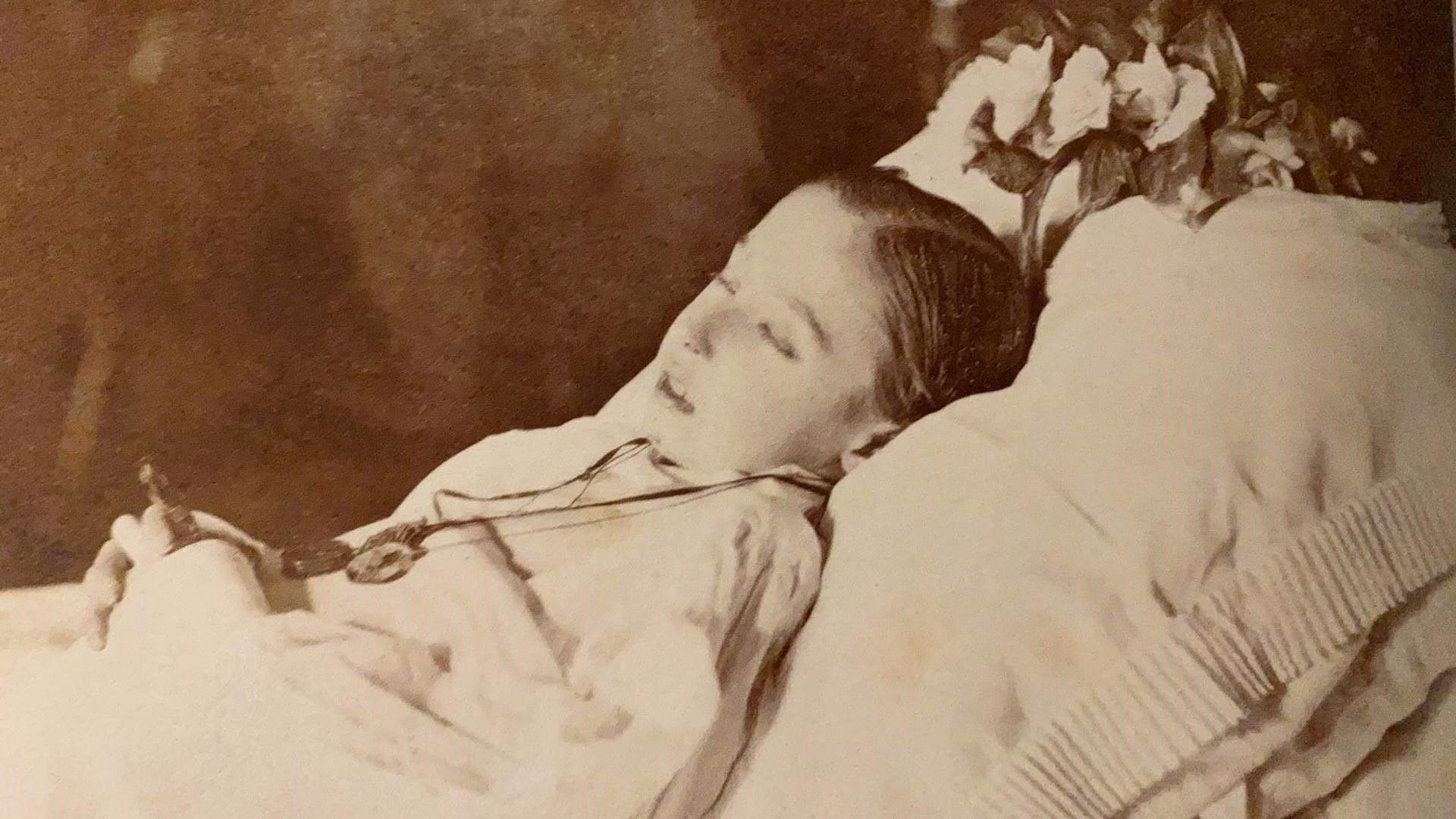
Prince Leopold, Duke of Brabant on his bier, 1869. Collection Ralf De Jonge.

In the spring of 1868, the almost 9-years-old Leopold, Duke of Brabant, suffered from a chill following a fall in the pond in the Park of Laeken. His condition deteriorated rapidly: the doctor diagnosed acute pericarditis. In summer, he seemed to recover, but his cough persisted. The doctor recommended the removal of the uvula and performed this surgery, then his young patient went to Ostend to recover. Queen Marie Henriette isolated herself in Spa to rest, while King Leopold II, held back by affairs of state, and his two daughters remained in Laeken. In August, Leopold, suffering from dropsy, was brought back to Laeken. The Queen thenceforth never left her son's bedside. After having received the last sacraments in September, the little patient looked better, but his condition worsened again until he died on 22 January 1869. During the illness of the Duke of Brabant, Louise was fully aware of the seriousness of her brother's condition, for which she prayed before bidding him farewell.

This first drama in the life of the young princess and of the entire Belgian royal family deeply affected Louise, who wrote in her memoirs: "It was a tear in my being [...]. I dared, I remember, to curse God, to deny him [...]. I could no longer conceive an existence without him". Louise's paternal uncle Prince Philippe, Count of Flanders, became the new heir to the throne, and five months later, on 3 June the same year, the Countess of Flanders gave birth to a boy who received the old national first name of Baudouin. King Leopold II nourished the hope of having a second son and therefore resumed an intimate life with the Queen; but, after a miscarriage in March 1871, a third daughter was born on 30 July 1872: Clémentine, the last child of the royal couple.

=== Wedding in Brussels ===
==== A coveted princess ====
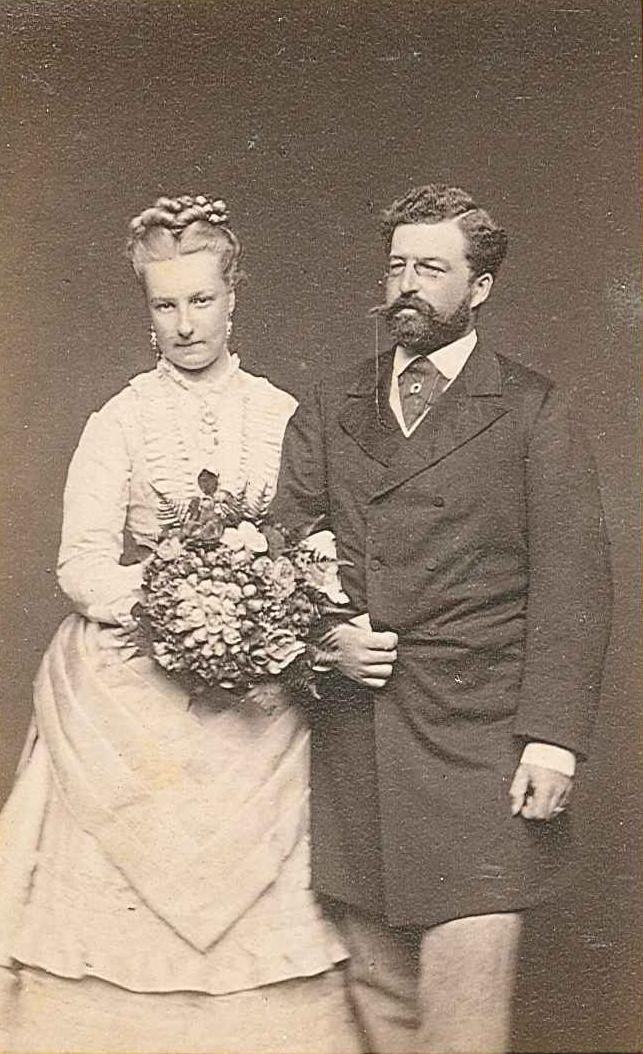
Princess Louise and her husband, Prince Philipp of Saxe-Coburg and Gotha. Photography by Géruzet brothers, 1875.

Louise had just celebrated her 14th birthday when she was actively sought after by several European princes because she had a pleasant exterior and her father was reputed to be wealthy. King Leopold II had long feared having to give her in marriage to the Prince Imperial, son and heir of Napoleon III, because he considered the Bonapartes to be upstarts. After the fall of the Second French Empire and the proclamation of the French Third Republic, this "threat" faded and, very quickly, two candidates asked for the hand of the still-teenaged princess: Prince Frederick of Hohenzollern-Sigmaringen – brother of the Countess of Flanders (sister-in-law of Leopold II) – and a first cousin once removed (Note: Prince Philipp was the son of Prince August of Saxe-Coburg and Gotha, first-cousin of King Leopold II on the paternal side: August's father Prince Ferdinand of Saxe-Coburg and Gotha (by marriage heir of the House of Koháry) and Leopold II's father King Leopold I of Belgium were brothers as sons of Francis, Duke of Saxe-Coburg-Saalfeld.) of King Leopold II, Prince Philipp of Saxe-Coburg and Gotha (Note: Sometimes known as "Philipp of Saxe-Coburg and Gotha-Koháry", this name is not unanimous among historians and many are those who, like Olivier Defrance, consider that the family of Philipp's father August never added the surname name Koháry to that of Saxe-Coburg and Gotha. In fact, the correspondence of the Queen Victoria shows herself doubted that such a change was made to mark the marriage of August's paternal grandparents Prince Ferdinand of Saxe-Coburg and Gotha and Princess Maria Antonia Koháry de Csábrág, sole heiress of her family.) (member of the Koháry branch of the family).

Philipp presented his request for Louise's hand in 1872 and repeated it in the summer of 1873 when, after having toured the world, he went to Ostend accompanied by his mother, Princess Clémentine of Orléans, to make a formal visit to the Belgian sovereigns. Philipp was doubly-related to the Belgian royal family by both his paternal and maternal sides, being a member of the House of Saxe-Coburg and Gotha through his father, Prince August, and also a grandson of Louis Philippe I, King of the French (whose middle name he bore) through his mother, Princess Clémentine, who was the sister of Queen Louise of Belgium thus making Philipp a first cousin of Leopold II through their mothers. This made Philipp and Louise paternal second cousins and maternal first cousins once removed. Residing in Vienna and called to inherit the paternal fortune in the form of a sumptuous Majorat in Hungary, the prince, who was already enjoying the favor of Queen Marie Henriette (nostalgic about her birthplace), ended up also establishing himself as a privileged candidate in the eyes of King Leopold II, who did not want a rapprochement with Prussia so soon after the Franco-Prussian War of 1870.

From a familiar and political point of view, Philip was also allied with several European courts. His late paternal aunt, Princess Victoria of Saxe-Coburg and Gotha, married an Orléans prince, Louis, Duke of Nemours, second son of King Louis Philippe I. Their two sons were brilliantly married: the eldest, Gaston, Count of Eu, with Isabel, Princess Imperial of Brazil, and the second, Ferdinand, Duke of Alençon, with Duchess Sophie Charlotte in Bavaria, sister of Empress Elisabeth of Austria, "Sissi", thus becoming a brother-in-law of Emperor Franz Joseph I. Finally, Philip's paternal uncle, Prince Ferdinand of Saxe-Coburg and Gotha, became King consort of Portugal and the Algarves by his marriage to Queen Maria II da Gloria. As for Philip's sister, Princess Clotilde of Saxe-Coburg and Gotha, she was happily married with the brother of Queen Marie-Henriette, Archduke Joseph Karl of Austria, titular Palatine of Hungary.

==== Failed nuptials ====
Louise had been kept away from the matrimonial negotiations about her. However, once informed of her imminent engagement, she remembered favorably her future husband, fourteen years her senior, glimpsed during his visits to Brussels and that if they had said insignificant things to each other, she had the impression of "knowing him well, and always have". She was looking forward to getting married. The betrothal, celebrated on 25 March 1874, lasted for a year because Louise was not of marriageable age, and, as both bride and groom were closely related, a papal dispensation was required. After financial negotiations (King Leopold II wished to spend as little as possible), the couple were married at the Royal Palace of Brussels on 4 February 1875.

Louise recalled in her memoirs: "Marrying me had become an obsession with him. What kind of love inspired him? Was he enamored of the grace of my chaste youth, or did the precise notion of the King's situation and the future of his undertakings inflame with a positive fire the heart of a man in love with the realities of down here?". She adds: "Healthy and pure, brought up in a beautiful balance of physical and moral health by the care of an incomparable mother, deprived by my rank, of more or less awake friends who make confidences, I gave myself all the energy of an ethereal confidence in the upcoming marriage, without realizing exactly what it could be".

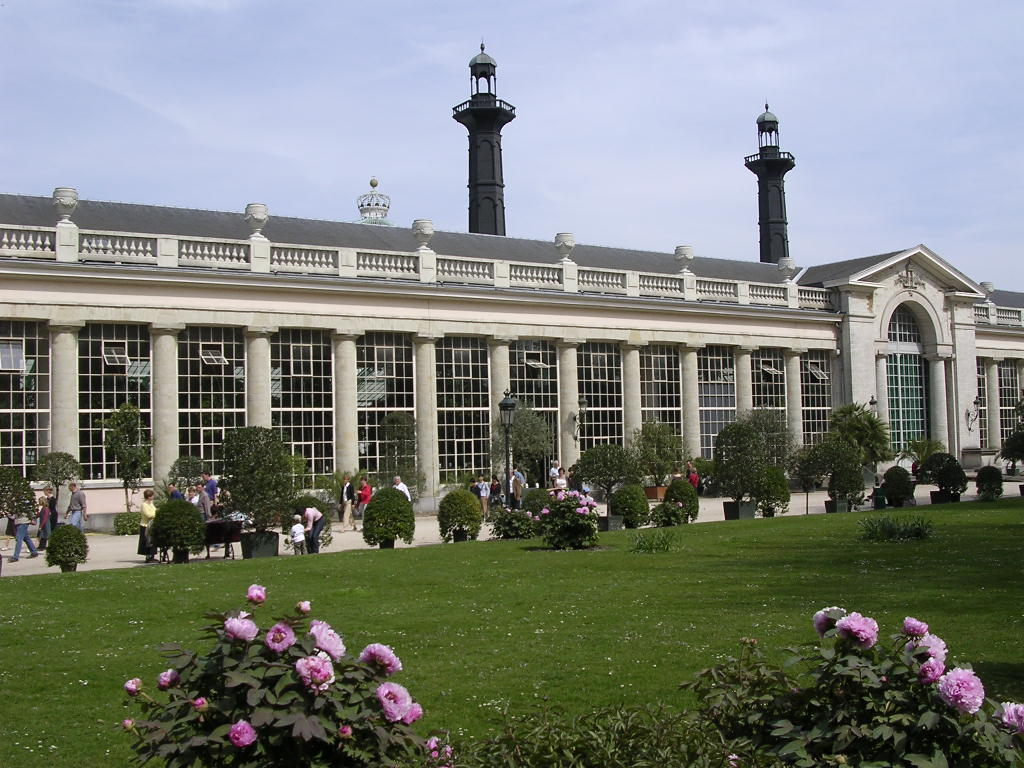
The orangerie of the Royal Greenhouses of Laeken in Brussels, where Louise took refuge on her wedding night.

After the ball given for the wedding, bride and groom left Brussels for the Palace of Laeken, where the wedding night turned out to be a fiasco. Louise describes her setbacks in her memoirs: "I am not the first who, victim of an excessive reserve based, perhaps, on the hope that the delicacy of the husband and the maternal nature will agree to arrange everything, learns nothing of a mother, of what to hear when the hour of the shepherd strikes. Still, having come at the end of the wedding evening at the Château de Laeken, and while all of Brussels danced to the interior and exterior lights of national joys, I fell from the sky on a bed of rocks lined with thorns. Psyche, more guilty, was better treated. The day was hardly going to appear when, taking advantage of a moment when I was alone in the bridal chamber, I fled through the park [...] and I was going to hide my shame in the orangerie. A sentry had seen [me]. He ran to the castle [...]. The Queen was not long in appearing. My mother stood beside me for a long time. She was as maternal as she could be. There is no pain which in his arms and in his voice, would not have calmed down. I listened to her scolding me, cuddling me, telling me about the duty I should understand".

Before returning to their main residence, the Palais Coburg in Vienna, where Louise would have liked to take one of her faithful chambermaids, which was not allowed, the bride and groom paid a few visits to the courts of Gotha and Dresden. Each evening Philipp made his young wife serve abundant heady wines before subjecting her to his erotic readings. Louise then discovered Prague and Budapest.

=== A disastrous union ===
==== In the Palais Coburg ====
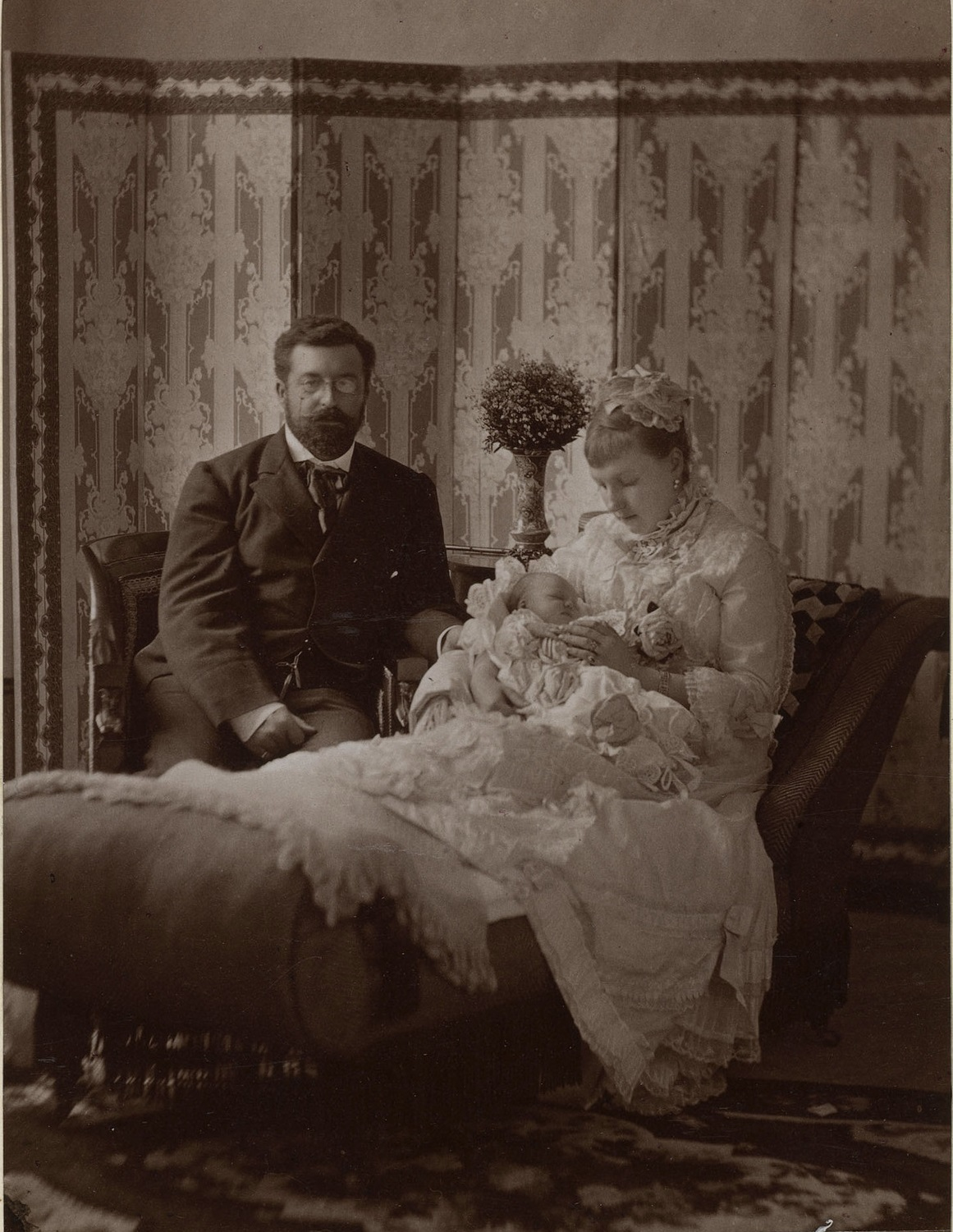
Louise with her husband Prince Philipp of Saxe-Coburg and Gotha and their son Leopold Clement. Photography by Josef Gutkaiss, 1878.

On 15 March 1875, Louise discovered her new residence and was deeply disappointed by it: "I was cold when I entered it. Looks great on the outside. It is gloomy inside [...]. My room terrified me. Imagine a moderately large room, furnished halfway up the wall with small dark wood wardrobes, closed with blue curtained panes behind which I never wanted to look! [...] In the middle of this paradise, an immense display case full of the prince's travel memories: stuffed birds with long beaks, weapons, bronzes, ivories, Buddhas, pagodas. My heart was lifted!". In this setting that she didn't like, Philipp and his mother Clémentine decided everything. Louise did not adapt to this new life: If her father-in-law was a self-effacing man, Princess Clémentine was a woman of character and a possessive mother who bluntly imposed her lifestyle on her 17-year-old daughter-in-law.

The young couple argued regularly. Philipp wanted to transform his wife, who he saw as his property, and tried to introduce the young woman to a sexuality that she disapproved of by giving her daring books to read or by making her discover his erotic collection brought back from Japan. Louise took her revenge by leading the lavish life of a spendthrift socialite, where her beauty attracted and her attitude shocked the court of Vienna. She had a very keen sense of observation, a talent for imitating, and a biting satire that liked to highlight the faults of her fellows. Viennese society quickly assigned her several love affairs.

When Louise and her husband stayed in Brussels with the sovereigns in the summer of 1876, King Leopold II ignored his daughter. No doubt he learned of the marital disputes and heard of Louise's reputation in Vienna. The couple, disunited in their marriage, nevertheless had two children: a son, Leopold Clement (born 19 July 1878) and a daughter, Dorothea (born 30 April 1881); in addition, Louise suffered two miscarriages in 1886 and 1888. These two births, however, did not bring the couple, who quarreled frequently, close. Louise became more and more hostile, multiplying the tantrums towards her husband and not enjoying her role as mother. From 1887, her children were brought up separately in order to receive an adapted program: Leopold Clement came under the authority of a tutor, while Dorothea was entrusted to a governess.

Louise became a friend of Rudolf, Crown Prince of Austria, who was her age, due to her nonconformism and her beauty; she encouraged him to marry her younger sister Stéphanie. The wedding took place in Vienna on 10 May 1881. When Stéphanie settled down at the Austrian court, her mother Marie Henriette warned her: "Avoid Louise, and if you see her, reason with her, show her a good example [...] Louise is not true. She is very frivolous". His marriage brought the Crown Prince even closer to the Coburgs, but if he held Louise in esteem, he nonetheless shared Philipp's debauchery. In addition, Rudolf had few interests in common with his young wife, who gave him a daughter. Affected by a venereal disease, he infected his wife, who became sterile. Disappointed in both his emotional and political life, Rudolf led a life of debauchery until the Mayerling incident in 1889.

==== First adulteries ====
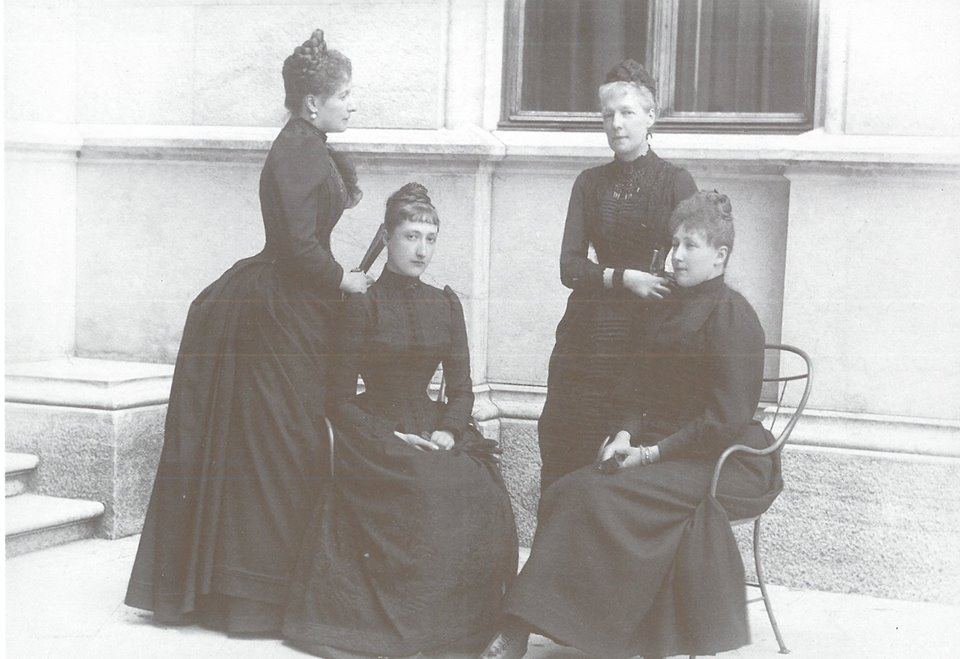
Queen Marie Henriette of Belgium standing on the right, and her 3 daughters. From left to right: Louise, Clémentine and Stéphanie, 1889.

In 1883, Louise began a liaison with Baron Daniël d'Ablaing de Giessenburg, her husband's military attaché. Queen Marie Henriette tried to convince her daughter to break up with the officer. Relations between Louise and her mother remained unstable, but the Queen was delighted to see her two daughters and her sons-in-law again during the festivities given in Brussels in honor of the fiftieth year of King Leopold II's reign in April 1885.

When Baron d'Ablaing died unexpectedly in 1888, Philipp replaced him with a young Hungarian aristocrat, Baron Nicolas Döry de Jobahàza, a distinguished horseman and hunting enthusiast. Louise quickly experienced passionate feelings for Döry, whom she saw a lot because his role as aide-de-camp required a daily presence with the Coburg couple. Döry even accompanied them during the stays abroad of Louise and Philipp, who frequently traveled to Germany and Italy. In February 1890, during a journey that took the trio from Paris to Algeria via Spain, Louise saw with pleasure her cousin Maria Christina of Austria, who had become Regent of the Kingdom of Spain on behalf of her underage son Alfonso XIII.

While Philipp still had feelings for Louise, the latter took advantage of her husband's absence to spend as much time as possible with Nicolas Döry. Simple flirtation had become an affair that Philipp tried to end with the help of his mother-in-law Marie Henriette. In August 1890, she received Döry alone, in Ostend, but the interview did not stop the course of the liaison, which continued until Döry's marriage in October 1893.

In 1894 Louise and her husband made a long journey to Egypt. She did not immediately appreciate the charms of the country where everything indisposed her: the noise, the crowd, the gloomy weather. She suffered from loneliness, but gradually, she began to enjoy herself, as evidenced by this letter to Stéphanie: "Now I like life here [...] The pyramids have greatly disappointed me, not the landscape which is strange, but the very thing. I didn't go up there, it was too tiring, while Philipp was up, I got on a camel, which amused me a lot".

The historian Olivier Defrance analyzed the "Döry affair" as having exacerbated all the Coburg couple's problems: "Louise's inexorable estrangement from her husband, the excessive interference of the family in the couple, mainly of the Queen of the Belgians and the depressed state of the princess". At the end of 1894, difficulties appeared lessened, and Louise approached her children.

=== A new life ===
==== A European scandal ====
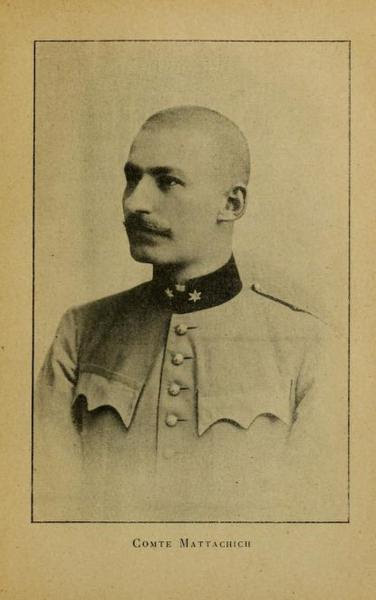
Count Geza Mattachich, Louise's lover.

In May 1895, Louise met, at the Prater in Vienna, a Croatian officer, Count Geza Mattachich, nine years her junior, who became her great love and benefactor. From this first meeting, Louise fell under Mattachich's spell. She went daily to the Prater where she hoped to see him again, as well as to the Opera. The following year, Mattachich, recently promoted to First Lieutenant in the Imperial and Royal Uhlan Regiment, traveled to Opatija in the Austrian Riviera where he heard about Louise's presence and presented himself to her at a ball. Also in love, Louise offered him the management of her stables and wanted him to give her riding lessons. In the spring of 1896, Mattachich became director of Louise's stables, who also mandated him to manage her finances. Their connection quickly became known, and the Emperor Franz Joseph I summoned Louise on this subject. He reminded her that she had a husband and advised her to travel and to abstain from appearing at the next court ball. From that day on, she was, in Mattachich's words, "just a fallen woman, without any support".

Louise's affair became known all over Europe. Queen Marie Henriette and King Leopold II forbade Stéphanie to see her older sister, who was no longer received in Belgium. On 18 February 1898, Louise's birthday, Prince Philipp challenged Geza Mattachich to a duel to maintain his honor as a scorned husband, but lost to his opponent. At the end of the duel, Mattachich joined Louise in Nice, where she was with her daughter. Philipp succeeded in separating Dorothea from her mother by sending the young girl and her fiancé Ernst Günther of Schleswig-Holstein-Sonderburg-Augustenburg to Dresden. Philipp then tried to settle his wife's heavy debts, but he failed to fully meet the demands of the creditors. He addressed his father-in-law, King Leopold II, who refused to contribute anything. Finally, Emperor Franz Joseph I himself settled the debts from personal finances, causing the breakdown of relations between the King of the Belgians and the Emperor of Austria.

==== Deprived of liberty ====
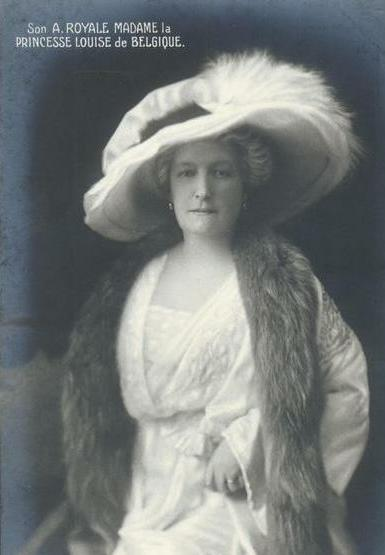
Princess Louise, ca. 1900.

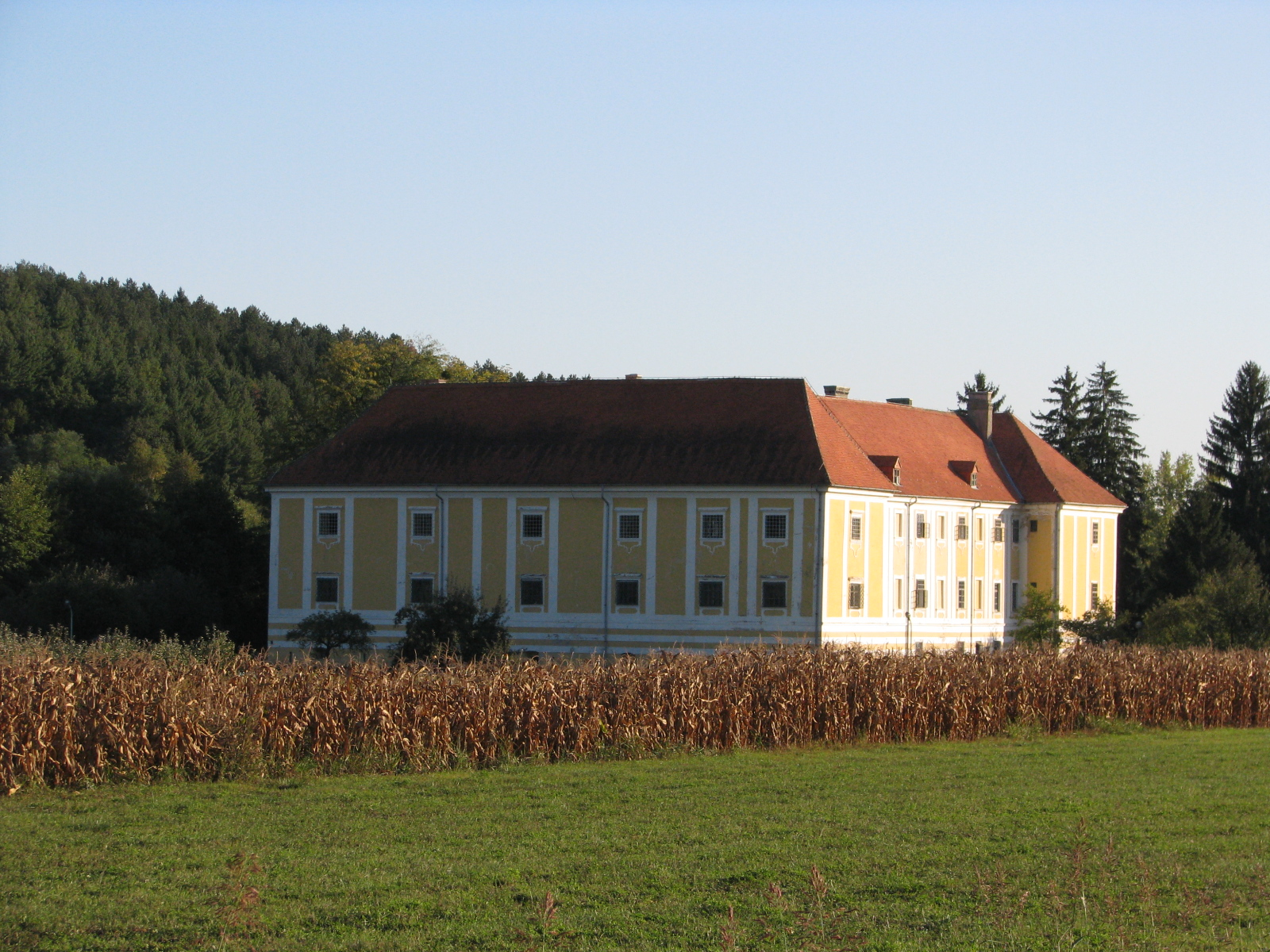
Loborgrad castle in Lobor, Zagorje, Croatia, owned by Geza's step-father, where Louise and Geza lived with his mother and step-father during their exile in 1898

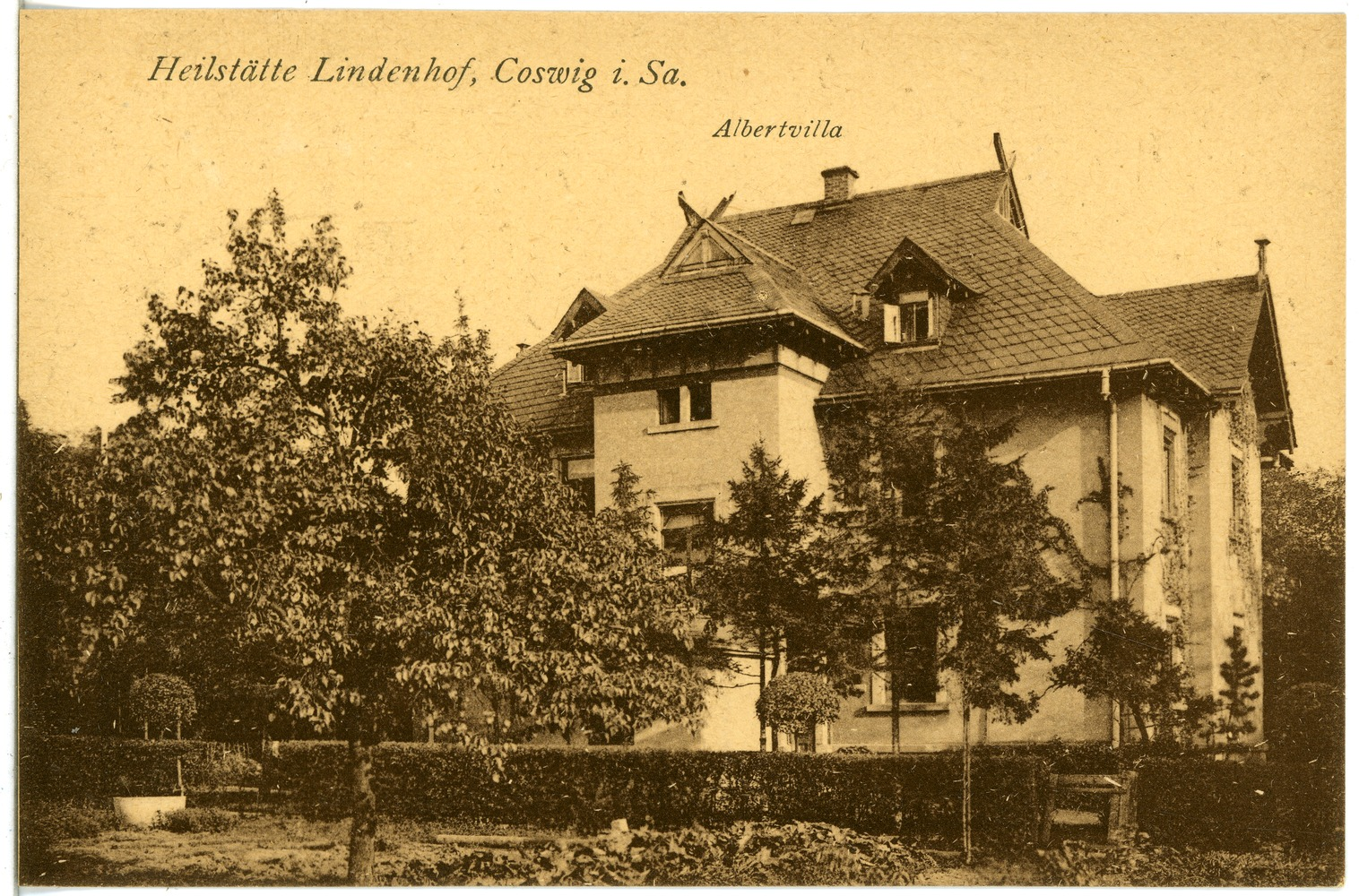
Villa Albert, one of the pavilions of the Lindenhof Sanatorium, Coswig, where Louise was held from 1899 to 1904.

In 1898, a few weeks after the duel, Philipp and the Emperor of Austria were determined to bring Louise back to Austria and remove her from Mattachich's influence. Supported in his designs by the Belgian sovereigns, Philipp then had his wife declared insane and convinced Emperor Franz Joseph I to have her locked up in a psychiatric hospital. Louise had the choice between returning to the Palais Coburg or internment in a nursing home. She opted for the second solution: the nursing home in Döbling, near Vienna, where she was installed in a special pavilion, isolated from other residents because of her rank.

Entering Döbling in May 1898, Louise was observed by various doctors, while Count Geza Mattachich was accused of forging drafts signed with the names of Louise and Stéphanie, and imprisoned in the military prison of Zagreb. (Note: The judgment rendered by the Imperial and Royal court of Zagreb was notified to Geza Mattachich on 31 December 1898 and stated that the accused was convinced of having forged the signatures of [Stéphanie] and [Louise] on four bills of exchange dated from Presbourg on 15 June 1897, amounting to a total of 475,000 guilders and on two other bills of exchange, dated Budapest on 25 September 1897, one for 100,000, the other for 150,000 florins. Mattachich was convicted of fraud and [...] of having gone abroad without authorization [...]. He was stripped of the nobiliary title attached to his person, removed from his officer rank, and sentenced to six years of solitary confinement, aggravated by one day of fasting on the 15th of each month and one day in camp bed on the 25th of each month and in absolute isolation the first and seventh months of each year that his sentence would last.) In January 1899 Geza was sentenced to the military prison of Möllersdorf, south of Vienna.

In November 1898, Louise was transferred to a sanatorium in Purkersdorf, also near Vienna, where she received more favorable treatment than in Döbling. Following the publication of several articles in the Austrian press favorable to his wife, Philipp believed that his own situation in Austria could become delicate. He therefore decided to have Louise installed outside the Empire. On 17 June 1899, Louise therefore was transferred to another medical institution, this time located in Saxony, the Lindenhof Sanatorium in Coswig, where she enjoyed a villa in the park at her service and where she resided with her lady-in-waiting Anna von Gebauer and a maid, Olga Börner. During her years of internment, apart from her daughter Dorothea, whom she wanted to see again in February 1903, Louise did not receive any other visit from her relatives, not even Stéphanie.

While in detention near Vienna, Geza met Maria Stöger, (Note: Maria Stöger née Bog, was born in Dubrovnik in 1876 as the daughter of a Czech soldier and a Croatian woman. Thanks to her father's various military assignments, she became multilingual. Married to Karl Stöger, she had a son, Oskar, born in 1897. After having been Geza Mattachich's mistress, in 1900 she gave birth to a second son, Alfred, who was in all likelihood Mattachich's son. Often in the wake of the Geza-Louise couple, Maria Stöger stayed with them for long periods. Having maintained correspondence with Louise until her death, she moved to Baden, near Vienna where she died in 1960.) a 23-year-old married woman, who, having heard from the press of the affair with Louise, decided to work as a cantinière (lunch lady) in the Möllersdorf penitentiary where Geza was being held. She joined him in June 1899, managed to gain his trust, and became his mistress. To obtain her lover's release, she activated effectively with legal advisers before being retired from prison in June 1901. However, she lived near the prison and promoted the publication of press articles in favor of her lover. On 27 August 1902, Geza was pardoned and released. Geza was interviewed in January 1903 by the French journalist and publisher Henri de Noussanne, who became his friend and with whom he discussed his plans to free Louise. In exchange for exclusive rights to the story of the adventure planned for his daily newspaper Le Journal, he paid a monthly pension of 4,000 francs to Mattachich for one year.

==== Between divorce and trial ====
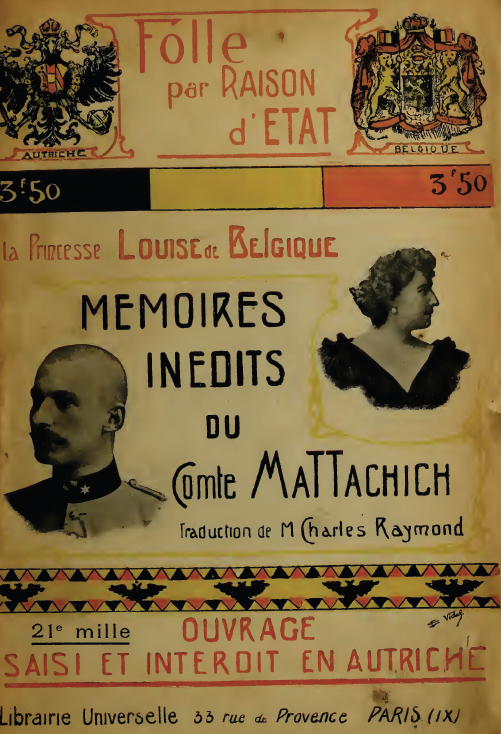
Memoirs of Count Geza Mattachich (1904).

Geza Mattachich published in January 1904, first in Leipzig, his memoirs entitled "Mad by Reason of State" (Folle par raison d'État), a real plea in favor of Louise's release. Mattachich related the circumstances of Louise's internment, her unhappy childhood between disunited parents, and the marriage which was imposed on her, placing her in an ambiguous situation at the court of Vienna, obliged to comply with the ceremonial, but where she had become "victim of the intrigues of the court". The work, also translated into French, met with little success in Europe and was seized and banned in the Austro-Hungarian Empire.

Then Geza brought his plan to fruition and succeeded, on 31 August 1904, in freeing the princess then in thermal cure in Bad Elster, in Saxony, where the surveillance was somewhat relaxed. After a long journey, Louise, Geza, and Maria Stöger (who had just told the princess the true nature of her relationship with Mattachich) arrived in France, where they stayed at the Westminster hotel in the Rue de la Paix, Paris. The reactions of the Belgian royal family were lively: the Countess of Flanders (Louise's aunt), wrote to her daughter Henriette that this kidnapping was an incredible thing and that her niece was unaware of her fate. Henriette answered him: "Louise Coburg's fugue is a dismal tragicomedy. This 46-year-old woman, faded and stamped, kidnapped in a car paid for by a French journalist, what will we see soon?".

In 1905, Louise was declared "sane" during a medical examination carried out by the judicial authorities in Paris. Prince Philipp proposed an amicable separation with a comfortable monthly pension of 7,000 Austro-Hungarian krones. The divorce was finally pronounced at Gotha on 15 January 1906, but Louise, accustomed to living lavishly, found herself in debt again and traveled with Mattachich across Europe, fleeing her numerous creditors. From 1907, Maria Stöger no longer resided regularly with Louise and Geza, but the latter made Anna von Gebauer, Louise's lady-in-waiting, his new mistress. While she had just signed an acknowledgment of debts amounting to 250,000 marks in Berlin, Louise learned, by November 1907, that her share of the jewelry of late Queen Marie Henriette (who died in 1902), seized by her creditors, had been put on public sale. Then, Louise's wardrobe was dispersed at auction in Vienna.

When King Leopold II died in December 1909, Louise returned to Belgium, but, because of her cohabitation with Mattachich, she was forced to remain in the shadows of the funeral ceremonies. Louise and her sisters discovered that their father had left his chief mistress, the French prostitute Caroline Lacroix as the main beneficiary of his will and a portion of his legacy to the Royal Trust, but also deliberately concealed property that should have been included in his estate in shell companies in Germany and France. His goal was not only to deprive his daughters of it, but also to allow his town-planning projects to continue. Louise was determined to receive her share of the paternal inheritance. The Belgian state offered a financial transaction to the three princesses, who would each receive a sum of 2 million francs. While Stéphanie and Clémentine accepted the proposal, Louise refused it and intended, in December 1910, a first trial against the State and her two sisters. In April 1911, Louise initiated a second lawsuit concerning the French companies created by Léopold II. In 1912, Louise, with the help of her sister Stéphanie, who had become her ally, was defended by Henri Jaspar and Paul-Émile Janson and persevered in her legal actions. The two princesses refused a new amicable agreement with the State, before being dismissed by the Court of Appeal of Brussels in April 1913. However, on 22 January 1914, an agreement was concluded between Louise, the Belgian State and some of her creditors: Similar to her younger sisters, she would receive a little more than 5 million francs from her late father's fortune.

=== Last years ===
==== During World War I ====
When World War I broke out in 1914, Louise and Geza resided in their apartments at the Parkhotel in Vienna-Hietzing. Louise wrote: "The war surprised me in Vienna. Until the first hostilities, I could not bring myself to believe it [...] I was, from the first day of the war, "enemy subject" for the court of Vienna, too happy to find an opportunity of still stand out in my regard. I was invited to leave the territory of the double monarchy as quickly as possible. The President of Police came, in person, to notify me of this judgment [...] I left for Belgium. Events stopped me in Munich. The German army blocked the road and my homeland was to experience the horrors for which Prussia was initially responsible". Up to August 1916, Louise and Geza lived in Munich with Maria Stöger who joined them six months before, without suffering too much deprivation, but then financial resources dwindled. The annual pension of 50,000 francs paid to her by the Belgian state in her capacity as Princess of Belgium was cut, and Louise took out new loans. In April 1916, her son Leopold Clement, who had openly sided with his father and refused all contact with his mother, died in tragic circumstances following a fight with his mistress who, before committing suicide, had thrown him acid in the face and then shot him four times.

On 25 August 1916 Geza was arrested at the instigation of the Austrian government which suspected him, as a Croatian subject, of conspiring against the Empire. He was sent to a camp not far from Budapest. Louise experienced poverty again and had to sell her jewelry in order to ensure her livelihood. In November, she was forced to move to another hotel in the Austrian capital. At the beginning of 1917, her debts amounted to 30 million marks. Declared insolvent, she helplessly attended the auction of all her effects. She was forced to take a room in a small villa in town and survived thanks to a few occasional interventions from her daughter Dorothea and her sister Stéphanie. One day, she received a visit from a messenger from Geza who succeeded in taking her out of Austria and settling her in Budapest. Geza, still imprisoned, however managed to pay her short visits, and contacts with Stéphanie were reborn. In April 1919, Louise returned to Vienna because she had to leave Hungary on the orders of Béla Kun, one of the strongmen of the Hungarian Soviet Republic.

==== The impossible return to Belgium and Death ====
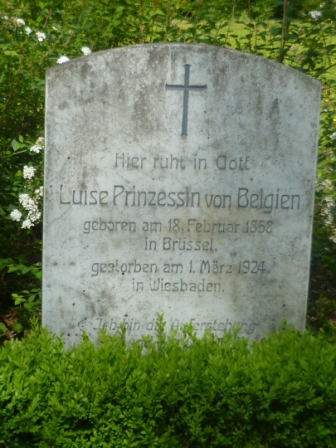
Tombstone of Princess Louise in the South Cemetery of Wiesbaden on which are engraved the words Hier ruht in Gott Luise Prinzessin von Belgien ("Here rests in God Louise Princess of Belgium").

After the Armistice of 11 November 1918 and the liberation of Belgium, Louise's property was sequestered because she was considered to be Hungarian by the Belgian State. She then decided, probably thanks to the assistance of Henri de Noussanne, to write her memoirs, published in Paris in 1921 under the title Autour des trônes que j'ai vu tomber ("Around the thrones that I saw fall"); in it, she settled the score with various people in her life, including her father Leopold II –yet she dedicated the work "to the great man and great King that was her father". On 3 July of the same year, her former husband Prince Philipp died in Coburg; Louise was obviously excluded from any inheritance.

While trying to return to Belgium since 1920, Louise, who had become undesirable in her native country because of her situation as an "enemy subject", was forced to stay outside Belgian borders, so as not to offend public opinion still battered by the war.

During an illegal stay in Paris, Geza Mattachich died on 1 October 1923 following uremia aggravated by cardiac pathology, in the modest hotel where he and Louise were staying. Now completely isolated because no member of the Belgian royal family wanted to help or receive her in Belgium, in December of the same year, the Belgian consul general in Paris offered Louise to settle in Wiesbaden, where she moved to the Hotel Nassauer Hof with a lady-in-waiting and a maid.

In February 1924, Louise suffered from acute circulatory problems suddenly aggravated by a double congestion. In the early afternoon of Saturday 1 March, she received a visit from a friend, Julius Fritz, who noticed that she was dying. Fritz set out to find a priest to administer the last rites to her, but when he returned with the clergyman, the two men could only note Louise's death at 2 p.m. in the afternoon. Three days later, after a very sober funeral ceremony, she was buried in the South Cemetery of Wiesbaden. Absent during the funeral of their relative, the Belgian royal family (who had dispatched their trusted man Baron Auguste Goffinet in their behalf), mourned her for a month.

== Historiography ==
=== Autobiography ===
In her memoirs published in 1921 under the title Autour des trônes que j'ai vu tomber, Louise immediately affirms her Belgian patriotism (always hoping for a return to her native country) then recounts her eventful existence and draws up interesting portraits, obviously subjective, of members of her family and of the European sovereigns she has met during her lifetime. This work offers first-hand testimony to the royal courts, some of which have disappeared by the time the author describes them. She also settles the score there. She describes Emperor Franz Joseph I as "a narrow man, full of false and preconceived ideas [...]. Under the decor of rank and ceremonies, under the vocabulary of receptions, audiences and speeches, there was a being devoid of sensitivity [...]. He looked like an automaton official, dressed as a soldier". But she praises the beauty of Empress Elisabeth, whom she sees as a "martyr".

Louise claims that her brother-in-law, King Ferdinand I of Bulgaria, attracted by occultism, told her during a stay at the court in Sofia in 1898: "You see all that is here, men and things. Well! everything, including my Kingdom, I place with me at your feet". She draws up a severe indictment against German Emperor Wilhelm II: "the emperor of illusion [...] who lulled his people with illusions and lies, and led them to ruin, civil war, dishonor". As for Queen Victoria, she remembers that she liked to gather her parents around her and admits that she sometimes displeased the British sovereign.

=== Biography ===
Olivier Defrance wrote the first biography dedicated to Louise of Belgium, published in 2001. During her lifetime, Louise had already become, writes the author, "a character in a novel, the legend going beyond reality, and that will last a long time...The memoirs that Louise will write [...] will consolidate the myth". Thanks to an investigation in numerous unpublished archives kept at the National Archives of Austria, the Pannonhalma Archabbey in Hungary, Brussels, Baden-Baden, Coburg, the Musée Condé or even Regensburg, the Belgian historian paints the full and nuanced portrait of this controversial figure of the Belgian dynasty. The biography sheds new light on Louise, psychologically unstable, but not devoid of intelligence.

The biography dedicated to Louise also includes an interesting analysis of the neuropsychiatrist Jean-Paul Beine who tries to answer the question: "Was Princess Louise of Belgium mad?". According to him, the psychiatrists who examined Louise played a leading role in the princess's internment. However, apart from the final expertise which made it possible to free the patient, the incomplete nature of their opinions probably constitutes an obstacle to a formal conclusion. Beine sees "an abusive maneuver [by which] the princess is led to give her written consent to this stay in a nursing home, which turns out from the first day to be interned in a mental institution". The last expertise of 1904–1905 concluded that there was no need for internment and guardianship. The reason given in favor of the internment finds its sources in the grievances of her family about her affair with Geza Mattachich and in an obscure case of unpaid drafts against a background of forgery. To conclude, Beine declares: "The lavishness of the princess did not, from the documents provided today, have its origin in a mental disorder such as to justify her internment".

== Aftermath ==
Louise has no living descendants today. Her son Prince Leopold Clement of Saxe-Coburg and Gotha, born in 1878, died unmarried and in the aforementioned tragic circumstances in 1916. As for her daughter Princess Dorothea of Saxe-Coburg and Gotha, born in 1881, married on 2 August 1898 (during the internment of her mother) with Ernst Gunther, Duke of Schleswig-Holstein-Sonderburg-Augustenburg, brother of the German Empress Augusta Victoria. This marriage, which Louise disapproved of, has remained without posterity, but on 11 November 1920 they adopted Prince Johann Georg and his sister Princess Marie Luise, children of a distant cousin, Prince Albrecht of Schleswig-Holstein-Sonderburg-Glücksburg, prematurely widowed. Dorothea had also given up all relationship with her mother, and after her husband's death in 1921 and in economical distress, she left the Neues Schloß in Primkenau for a modest residence in the same city, where she died in 1967.

== Titles and heraldry ==
=== Titles ===
At her birth, as the daughter of King Leopold II, Louise was titled Princess of Saxe-Coburg and Gotha and Duchess in Saxony, with the predicate of Royal Highness, according to the titles of her house, and bears the unofficial title of Princess of Belgium, which will be officially regularized by Royal Decree dated 14 March 1891.

- 18 February 1858 – 4 February 1875: Her Royal Highness Princess Louise of Saxe-Coburg and Gotha, Duchess in Saxony
- 4 February 1875 – 15 January 1906: Her Royal Highness Princess Philipp of Saxe-Coburg and Gotha
- 15 January 1906 – 1 March 1924: Her Royal Highness Princess Louise of Belgium

=== Heraldry ===
Coat of Arms of Louise as Princess of Belgium

== Ancestry ==
Ancestors of Princess Louise of Belgium

16. Ernest Frederick, Duke of Saxe-Coburg-Saalfeld
8. Francis, Duke of Saxe-Coburg-Saalfeld
17. Princess Sophie Antoinette of Brunswick-Wolfenbüttel
4. Leopold I of Belgium
18. Heinrich XXIV, Count Reuss of Ebersdorf
9. Countess Augusta Reuss of Ebersdorf
19. Countess Karoline Ernestine of Erbach-Schönberg
2. Leopold II of Belgium
20. Louis Philippe II, Duke of Orléans
10. Louis Philippe I of France
21. Louise Marie Adélaïde de Bourbon
5. Princess Louise of Orléans
22. Ferdinand I of the Two Sicilies
11. Princess Maria Amalia of Naples and Sicily
23. Archduchess Maria Carolina of Austria
1. Princess Louise of Belgium
24. Francis I, Holy Roman Emperor
12. Leopold II, Holy Roman Emperor
25. Maria Theresa of Austria
6. Archduke Joseph, Palatine of Hungary
26. Charles III of Spain
13. Infanta Maria Louisa of Spain
27. Princess Maria Amalia of Saxony
3. Archduchess Marie Henriette of Austria
28. Frederick II Eugene, Duke of Württemberg
14. Duke Louis of Württemberg
29. Princess Friederike of Brandenburg-Schwedt
7. Duchess Maria Dorothea of Württemberg
30. Charles Christian, Prince of Nassau-Weilburg
15. Princess Henriette of Nassau-Weilburg
31. Princess Carolina of Orange-Nassau

== Bibliography ==
=== Autobiography ===
- de Belgique, Louise (1921). Autour des trônes que j'ai vu tomber (in French). Paris: Albin Michel. ISBN 978-2-87106-192-2.

=== Works ===
- de Belgique, Louise (2003). Autour des trônes que j'ai vu tomber: Mémoires des filles de Léopold II (in French). Brussels: Le Cri – Preface by Georges-Henri Dumont. ISBN 978-2-87106-324-7.
- Defrance, Olivier (2001). Louise de Saxe-Cobourg: Amours, argent, procès (in French). Brussels: Racine. ISBN 978-2-87386-230-5.
- Defrance, Olivier (2007). La Médicis des Cobourg: Clémentine d'Orléans (in French). Brussels: Racine. ISBN 978-2-87386-486-6.
- Defrance, Olivier; van Loon, Joseph (2013). La fortune de Dora: une petite-fille de Léopold II chez les nazis (in French). Brussels: Racine – Preface by Michel Didisheim. ISBN 978-2-87386-817-8.
- Enache, Nicolas (1999). La descendance de Marie-Thérèse de Habsburg (in French). Paris: Éditions L'intermédiaire des chercheurs et curieux. ISBN 978-2-908003-04-8.
- de Golesco, Hélène; de Weisme, Augustine (1944). Marie-Henriette, reine des Belges (in French). Brussels: La Renaissance du livre.
- Kerckvoorde, Mia (2001). Marie-Henriette: une amazone face à un géant (in French). Translated by Marie Hooghe. Brussels: Racine. ISBN 2-87386-261-0.
- Mattachich, Comte Geza (1904). Folle par raison d'État: la princesse Louise de Belgique. Mémoires inédits du comte Mattachich (in French). Paris: Librairie universelle.
- Ouvrage collectif (2003). Louise et Stephanie de Belgique. Brussels: Le Cri. (ISBN 2-87106-324-9).

=== Historical fiction ===
- Dan Jacobson (2005). All for Love. London: Hamish Hamilton. (ISBN 0241142733).
