= Prince Philipp of Saxe-Coburg and Gotha =

Prince Philipp
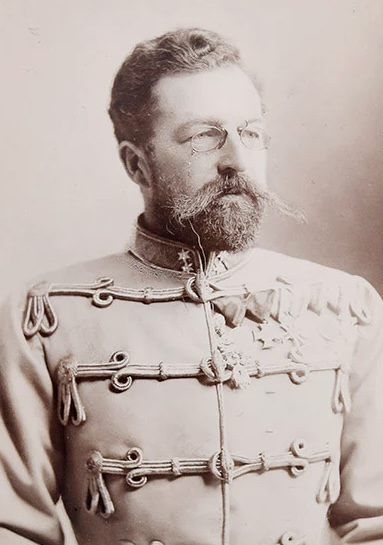
- Photograph, 1894

Head of the House of Saxe-Coburg and Gotha-Koháry
- Tenure: 26 July 1881 – 3 July 1921
- Predecessor: Prince August
- Successor: Prince Peter August
- Born: Prinz Ferdinand Philipp von Sachsen-Coburg und Gotha; 28 March 1844; Paris
- Died: 3 July 1921 (aged 77); Coburg
- Burial: St. Augustin, Coburg
- Spouse: Princess Louise of Belgium (m. 1875; div. 1906)
- Issue: Prince Leopold Clement; Dorothea, Duchess of Schleswig-Holstein
Names
- Ferdinand Philipp Maria August Raphael
- House: Saxe-Coburg and Gotha-Koháry
- Father: Prince August of Saxe-Coburg and Gotha
- Mother: Princess Clémentine of Orléans
- Religion: Roman Catholic

Ferdinand Philipp Maria August Raphael of Saxe-Coburg and Gotha (28 March 1844 – 3 July 1921) was the second prince of Saxe-Coburg and Gotha and lord of Csábrág and Szitnya, both in modern-day Slovakia.

== Life ==
Born in the Tuileries Palace in Paris as Ferdinand Philipp Maria August Raphael of Saxe-Coburg and Gotha on 28 March 1844, he was the eldest son of August, prince of Saxe-Coburg and Gotha. His mother, Clémentine of Orléans, was the daughter of King Louis Philippe I of France. He was a member of the Catholic Koháry line of the Saxe-Coburg and Gotha-Koháry and the elder brother of Ferdinand, tsar of Bulgaria.

In 1870, he became a Major in the Hungarian army. He was a close confidant to his brother-in-law, Crown Prince Rudolf. On the morning of 30 January 1889, he, along with Count Josef Hoyos-Sprinzenstein and valet Johann Loschek, discovered the bodies of Rudolf and his teenage mistress Baroness Mary Vetsera, who had also been shot dead.

Philipp spent his last years at Bürglaß castle in Coburg, where he died on 3 July 1921, aged 77. He was buried in the Koháry crypt in the St. Augustin church in Coburg.

== Marriage and issue ==
In Brussels on 4 February/4 May 1875, Philipp married Louise, princess of Belgium, both his second cousin and first cousin once removed, daughter of Leopold II, king of the Belgians and granddaughter of Leopold I, king of the Belgians, brother of Philipp's grandfather Ferdinand, and Louise of Orléans, sister of Phillip's mother Clémentine.

The marriage of Philip and Louise proved disastrous and she left her husband in 1896. In 1898, she lost parental power over her children and on 15 January 1906, the divorce was pronounced in Gotha. The reason for the separation was her long-standing relationship with Count Géza of Mattachich-Keglevich (1867–1923), with whom Philipp had dueled on the orders of Emperor Franz Josef I. Louise had had other affairs before she met Géza, among others with Philipp's adjutant.

They had two children:

- Leopold Clement Philipp August Maria (19 July 1878, Szent-Antal, Hungary - 27 April 1916, Vienna); he died when a former lover flung acid in his face.
- Dorothea Maria Henriette Auguste Louise (30 April 1881, Vienna - 21 January 1967, Taxis, Württemberg), married on 2 August 1898 to Ernst Günther, duke of Schleswig-Holstein-Sonderburg-Augustenburg.

== Numismatics ==
Prince Philip had an important collection of coins from Saxony, the East and overseas. He published about Oriental numismatics. His coin collection was auctioned in 1928 by the auction house Leo Hamburger in Frankfurt. Several commemorative medals were issued during his lifetime, for example in 1875 on the occasion of his marriage to Louise and in the same year for his honorary membership of the Belgian Numismatic Society.

== Honours ==
- Ernestine duchies: Grand Cross of the Saxe-Ernestine House Order, February 1862
- Belgium: Grand Cordon of the Order of Leopold (military), 16 June 1874 – wedding gift
- Austria-Hungary: Knight of the Golden Fleece, 1881
- Grand Duchy of Hesse: Grand Cross of the Ludwig Order, 27 April 1882
- Kingdom of Bavaria: Knight of St. Hubert, 1882
- Spain: Grand Cross of the Order of Charles III, 10 January 1884
- United Kingdom of Great Britain and Ireland:
  - Honorary Grand Cross of the Bath (civil), 3 August 1885
  - Honorary Grand Cross of the Royal Victorian Order, 9 November 1906
- Kingdom of Bulgaria: Knight of Saints Cyril and Methodius
- Malta: Bailiff Grand Cross of Honour and Devotion
- Monaco: Grand Cross of St. Charles, 21 March 1905
- Kingdom of Portugal: Grand Cross of the Tower and Sword
- Kingdom of Prussia:
  - Knight of the Red Eagle, 1st Class, 22 March 1883
  - Knight of the Black Eagle
- Kingdom of Saxony: Knight of the Rue Crown, 1891

== Ancestry ==
Ancestors of Prince Philipp of Saxe-Coburg and Gotha

8. Francis, Duke of Saxe-Coburg-Saalfeld
4. Prince Ferdinand of Saxe-Coburg and Gotha
9. Countess Augusta Reuss of Ebersdorf
2. Prince August of Saxe-Coburg and Gotha
10. Ferenc József, Prince Koháry de Csábrág et Szitnya
5. Princess Maria Antonia Koháry of Csábrág and Szitnya
11. Countess Maria Antonia von Waldstein
1. Prince Philipp of Saxe-Coburg and Gotha
12. Louis Philippe II, Duke of Orléans
6. Louis Philippe I of France
13. Louise Marie Adélaïde de Bourbon
3. Princess Clémentine of Orléans
14. Ferdinand I of the Two Sicilies
7. Princess Maria Amalia of Naples and Sicily
15. Archduchess Maria Carolina of Austria
