= Ernst Günther II, Duke of Schleswig-Holstein =

Ernst Gunther II
- Duke of Schleswig-Holstein
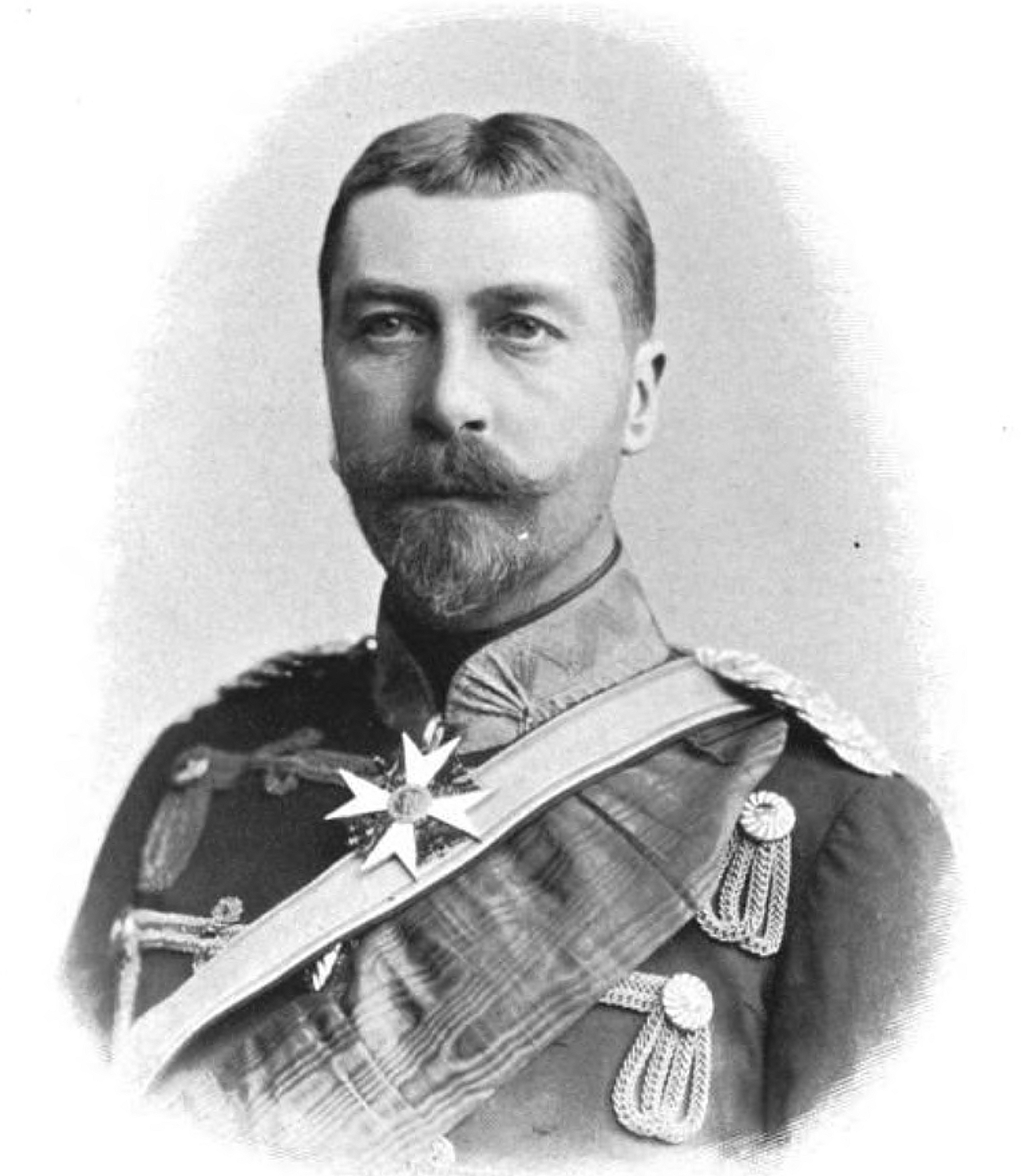
- Ernst Günther II in 1905
- Born: 11 August 1863; Dolzig, Brandenburg, Prussia
- Died: 22 February 1921 (aged 57); Primkenau, Lower Silesia, Prussia
- Spouse: Princess Dorothea of Saxe-Coburg and Gotha (m. 1898)
- House: Schleswig-Holstein-Sonderburg-Augustenburg
- Father: Frederick VIII, Duke of Schleswig-Holstein
- Mother: Princess Adelheid of Hohenlohe-Langenburg
- Religion: Lutheran

Ernst Gunther II, Duke of Schleswig-Holstein (11 August 1863 – 22 February 1921), was a son of Frederick VIII, Duke of Schleswig-Holstein and Princess Adelheid of Hohenlohe-Langenburg. He inherited his father's title as titular third duke of Schleswig-Holstein.

== Marriage ==
On 2 August 1898 in Coburg, Saxe-Coburg and Gotha, he married Princess Dorothea of Saxe-Coburg and Gotha, daughter of Prince Philipp of Saxe-Coburg and Gotha and Princess Louise of Belgium. The grandfather of the bride, King Leopold II, did not attend the wedding but sent the Grand Cordon of the Order of Leopold as wedding gift.

The couple had no children. However, on 11 November 1920, Ernst Gunther adopted Prince Johann Georg and his sister Princess Marie Luise, children of his cousin Prince Albrecht of Schleswig-Holstein-Sonderburg-Glücksburg.

== Honours ==
He received the following orders and decorations:

- Duchy of Anhalt: Grand Cross of Albert the Bear, 1891
- Austria-Hungary:
  - Grand Cross of the Imperial Order of Leopold, 1889
  - Grand Cross of St. Stephen, 1903
- Baden: Knight of the House Order of Fidelity, 1901
- Kingdom of Bavaria: Knight of St. Hubert, February 1901
- Belgium: Grand Cordon of the Order of Leopold (military), 22 July 1898
- Principality of Bulgaria: Grand Cross of St. Alexander
- (Saxe-Coburg and Gotha) (Duchy of Saxe-Altenburg) (Saxe-Meiningen) Ernestine duchies: Grand Cross of the Saxe-Ernestine House Order
- Grand Duchy of Hesse: Grand Cross of the Ludwig Order, 2 August 1898
- Kingdom of Italy: Grand Cross of Saints Maurice and Lazarus
- Netherlands: Grand Cross of the Netherlands Lion
- Kingdom of Prussia:
  - Knight of the Red Eagle, 1st Class, 10 March 1881
  - Knight of the Black Eagle, 22 October 1892; with Collar, 17 January 1893
- Saxe-Weimar-Eisenach: Grand Cross of the White Falcon
- Kingdom of Saxony: Knight of the Rue Crown
- Sweden: Commander Grand Cross of the Order of Vasa, 1890
- Württemberg: Grand Cross of the Württemberg Crown, 1892

== Ancestors ==
Ancestors of Ernst Günther II, Duke of Schleswig-Holstein

8. Frederick Christian II, Duke of Schleswig-Holstein-Sonderburg-Augustenburg
4. Christian Augustus II, Duke of Schleswig-Holstein-Sonderburg-Augustenburg
9. Princess Louise Augusta of Denmark
2. Frederick VIII, Duke of Schleswig-Holstein
10. Count Christian Danneskiold-Samsøe
5. Countess Louise Danneskiold-Samsøe
11. Henriette Kaas
1. Ernst Günther, Duke of Schleswig-Holstein
12. Karl Ludwig, Prince of Hohenlohe-Langenburg
6. Ernst I, Prince of Hohenlohe-Langenburg
13. Countess Amalie Henriette of Solms-Baruth
3. Princess Adelheid of Hohenlohe-Langenburg
14. Emich Carl, Prince of Leiningen
7. Princess Feodora of Leiningen
15. Princess Victoria of Saxe-Coburg-Saalfeld

Ernst Günther II, Duke of Schleswig-Holstein House of Schleswig-Holstein-Sonderburg-Augustenburg Cadet branch of the House of Oldenburg Born: 11 August 1863 Died: 22 February 1921
German nobility
Preceded by Frederick VIII	Duke of Schleswig-Holstein; 14 January 1880–22 February 1921	Succeeded by Albert
