= South Cemetery Wiesbaden =

Cemetery in Germany

Südfriedhof Wiesbaden South Cemetery Wiesbaden
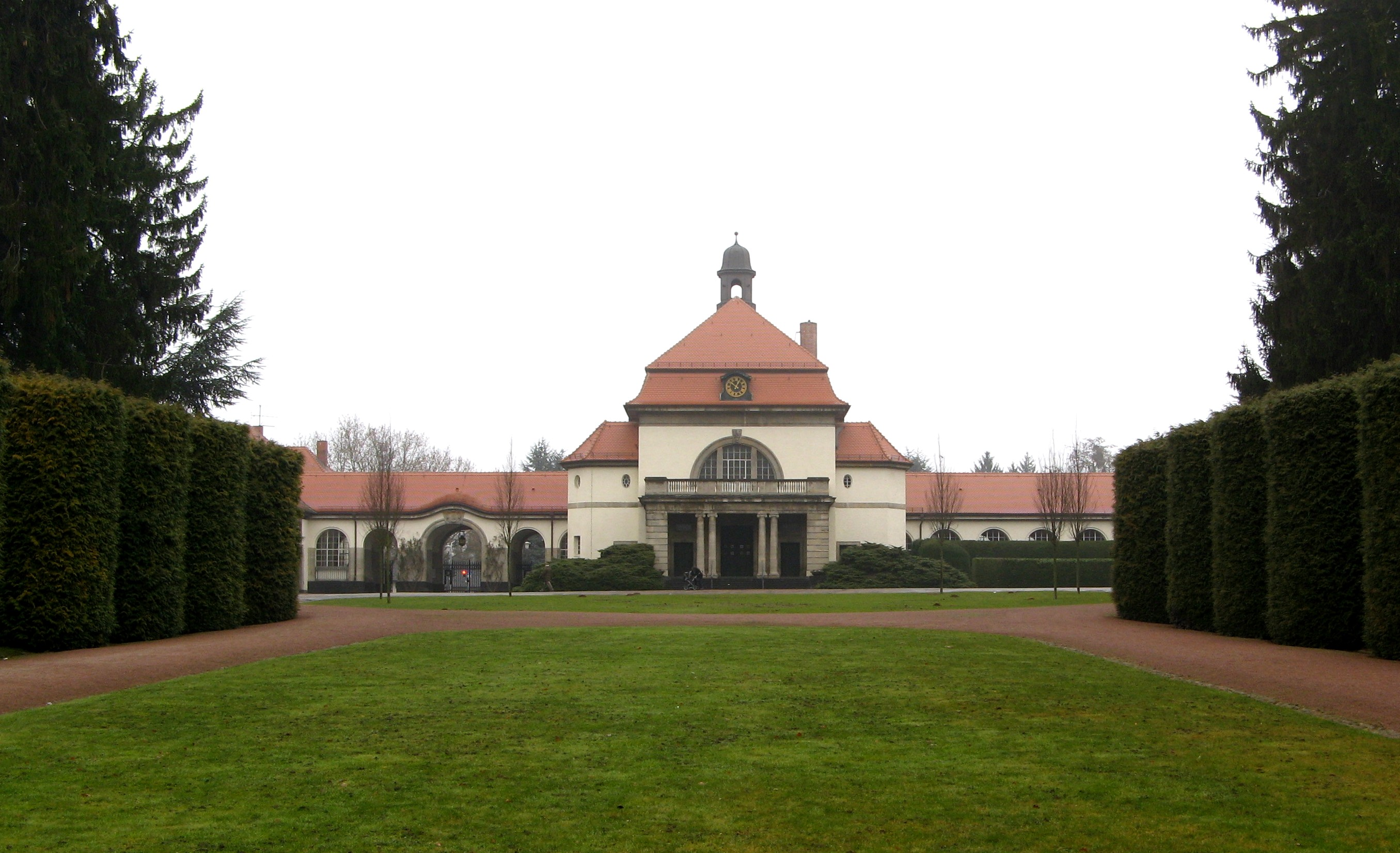

Details
- Established: 1909
- Location: Wiesbaden
- Country: Germany
- Coordinates: 50.0604°N 8.2681°E
- Find a Grave: Südfriedhof Wiesbaden; South Cemetery Wiesbaden

South Cemetery Wiesbaden (German: Südfriedhof Wiesbaden) is a cemetery in Wiesbaden, Germany. It was built according to the plans of Heinrich Zeininger.

== Notable burials ==
- Erich Abraham (1895–1971)
- Wolfgang Grams (1953–1993), member of the Red Army Faction
- Marek Hłasko (1934–1969)
- Princess Louise of Belgium (1858–1924)
- Wilhelm Jacoby (1855–1925)
- First Lieutenant Lothar Siegfried Freiherr von Richthofen (1894–1922)
- Captain Manfred Freiherr von Richthofen (also known as the "Red Baron") (1892–1918 †)
- Erna Sack (1898–1972)
- Ernst-Eberhard Hell (1887–1973)
