= Villa Teresa, Coswig =

Cultural site in Coswig, Saxony, Germany

Villa Teresa
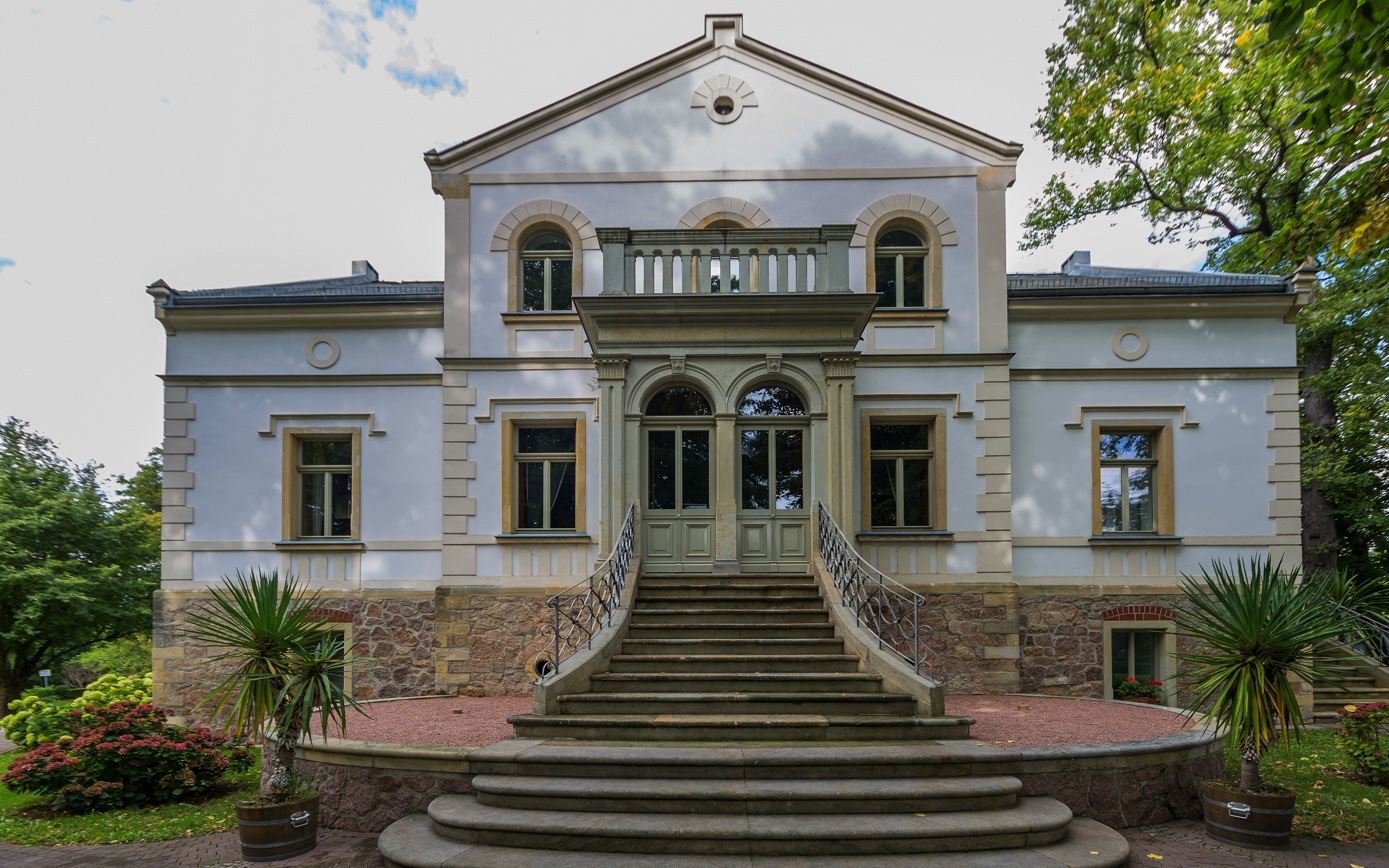

General information
- Architectural style: Neo-Renaissance
- Address: Kötitzer Straße 30, Kötitz, Coswig
- Country: Germany
- Coordinates: 51°7′12.7″N 13°34′25.5″E
- Completed: 1873

Website
- www.coswig.de/en/villa-teresa-702.html

Villa Teresa is a cultural site in Coswig in Saxony, Germany. The pianist, singer, conductor and composer Teresa Carreño and her husband, the pianist and composer Eugen d'Albert, lived here from 1891 to 1895. It is now a museum dedicated to the two musicians, with rooms furnished in the style of the period, and with a concert hall for chamber music concerts.

== History ==
The house was built in 1873, in Neo-Renaissance style. It was the residence of the Prussian field marshal Karl Eberhard Herwarth von Bittenfeld, before it became in 1891 the home of Teresa Carreño and Eugen d'Albert. They married in 1892; it was the second marriage of Eugen d'Albert, and he was Teresa Carreño's third husband; she brought two children from her earlier marriages.

They lived in the villa until 1895. They divorced, and Carreño continued her career in Berlin; d'Albert became court composer in Weimar. The house was sold in 1896. In 1961 it was acquired by the town of Coswig.

In 1995 the Förderverein Villa Teresa ("Association for the promotion of Villa Teresa") was founded. Renovation of the building began in 1999, the façade being restored with the help of old photographs, and was completed in 2002.

== Description ==
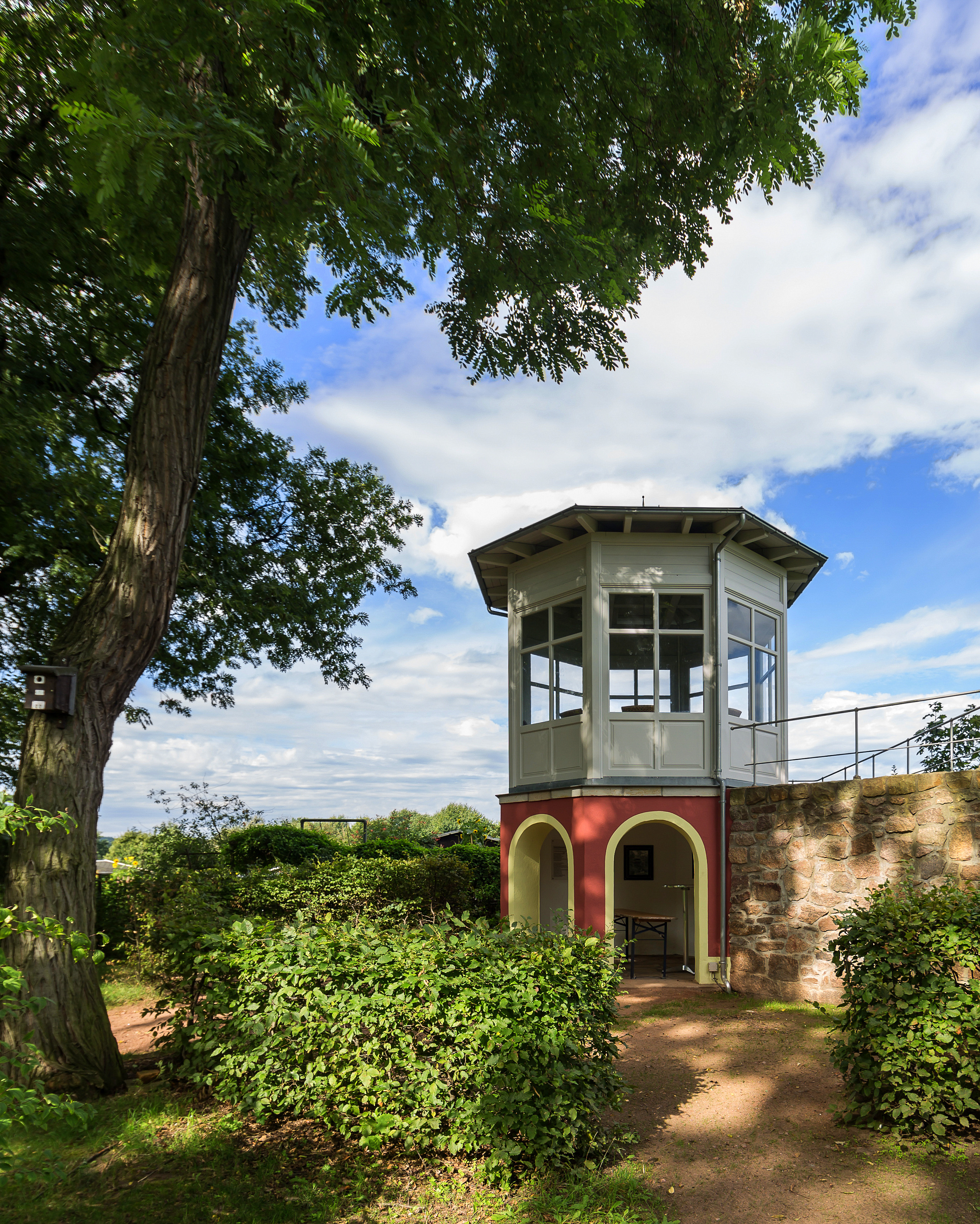
Composer's pavilion, in the grounds of the villa

Rooms are exhibited in a historical setting, with furniture, paintings and other items of the period. There is a museum room dedicated to Teresa Carreño and Eugen d'Albert, and a concert hall seating 100, where chamber music concerts are held.

In the grounds of the villa are a pond, a Japanese teahouse, and a pavilion where music was composed.

== See also ==
- List of music museums
