= Prince Leopold Clement of Saxe-Coburg and Gotha =

Austro-Hungarian officer

Prince Leopold Clement
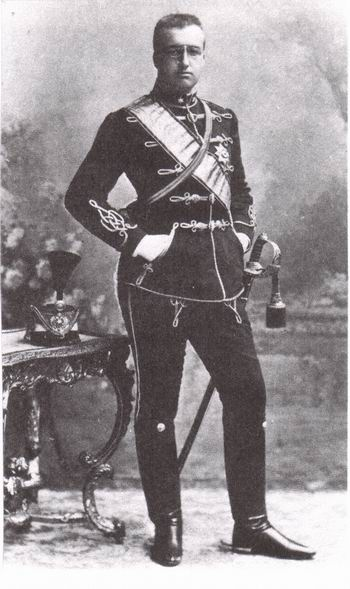
- Born: 19 July 1878; Szentantal, Hungary
- Died: 27 April 1916 (aged 37); Vienna, Archduchy of Austria, Austria-Hungary
- Burial: St. Augustin, Coburg
Names
- Leopold Clement Philipp August Maria
- House: Saxe-Coburg and Gotha-Koháry
- Father: Prince Philipp of Saxe-Coburg and Gotha
- Mother: Princess Louise of Belgium

Prince Leopold Clement Philipp August Maria of Saxe-Coburg and Gotha (19 July 1878 – 27 April 1916) was an Austro-Hungarian officer and the heir apparent to the wealth of the House of Koháry. His death in a murder–suicide shocked the royal courts of Austria and Germany.

== Background ==
Prince Leopold Clement was the elder child and only son born in the troubled marriage of Princess Louise of Belgium and Prince Philipp of Saxe-Coburg and Gotha, both of whom were Roman Catholic members of the House of Saxe-Coburg and Gotha. He shared his name with his maternal grandfather, King Leopold II of Belgium, and a number of other Coburger relatives. Prince Leopold Clement was the sole heir to the wealth his father's family had inherited from their ancestress, Princess Maria Antonia Koháry.

== Fatal affair ==
A Hussar captain in the Austro-Hungarian Army, Prince Leopold Clement met a Viennese girl named Camilla Rybicka (Note: Her name is sometimes given as Lotte, and her surname as Rybika or Rybicska.) at a charity bazaar in 1907. Rybicka was one of the daughters of Court Councillor Rybicki, an officer in the Vienna State Police. Then in her early twenties, she belonged to high society, but was nevertheless a commoner. The two soon started a romantic relationship. Rybicka left the family home, and the two travelled around the Austro-Hungarian Empire before settling down in an apartment in Vienna.

Rybicka, however, was not satisfied with being only the Prince's lover and demanded that he marry her. In Paris on 1 July 1914, Prince Leopold Clement wrote her a letter, promising to marry her within six months, naming her his sole heir, and requesting his father to pay her 2 million Austro-Hungarian krones in the event of his death. After Prince Leopold Clement was called to fight in the First World War, she insisted that he marry her before leaving. Leopold Clement was aware that such a mesalliance would have deprived him of the fortune he stood to inherit because his father had no intention of permitting the union, and that marrying Rybicka would have forced him to resign his officer's commission.

When her pleas, intrigues and threats all failed to secure her marriage to Leopold Clement, she was offered 4 million Austro-Hungarian krones as compensation. On 17 October 1915, the Prince called her to his first-floor flat in Vienna to say goodbye and sign the cheque, but Rybicka did not intend to take the money. Instead, she fired five shots at him at close range and then smashed a bottle of sulfuric acid in his face, before firing the sixth bullet through her own heart. Neighbours testified that they heard him scream in agony. The half-naked Rybicka was lying dead by the bed when the police came, but the Prince was alive on the floor and still screaming. Rybicka was cremated in Jena, Germany in December 1915. Having lost an eye and much of the flesh on his face, Prince Leopold Clement died after six months of suffering. His remains were interred in the vault of St. Augustin in Coburg.

== Aftermath ==
Following the death of his only son, Prince Philipp bequeathed his fortune to his grandnephew, Prince Philipp Josias. The deaths of Prince Leopold Clement and Camilla Rybicka shocked the royal courts of Austria and Germany. They were reminiscent of the 1889 Mayerling incident, a murder–suicide involving Crown Prince Rudolf of Austria, Prince Leopold Clement's maternal uncle, and Rudolf's teenage mistress, Baroness Mary Vetsera.

== Honours ==
- (Saxe-Coburg and Gotha) (Duchy of Saxe-Altenburg) (Saxe-Meiningen) Ernestine duchies: Grand Cross of the Saxe-Ernestine House Order, 1896
- Empire of Japan: Grand Cordon of the Order of the Chrysanthemum, 9 February 1907
- Korean Empire: Grand Cordon of the Order of the Golden Ruler, 27 February 1907

== Ancestry ==
Ancestors of Prince Leopold Clement of Saxe-Coburg and Gotha

8. Prince Ferdinand of Saxe-Coburg and Gotha
4. Prince August of Saxe-Coburg and Gotha
9. Princess Maria Antonia Koháry of Csábrág and Szitnya
2. Prince Philipp of Saxe-Coburg and Gotha
10. Louis Philippe I of France
5. Princess Clémentine of Orléans
11. Princess Maria Amalia of Naples and Sicily
1. Prince Leopold Clement of Saxe-Coburg and Gotha
12. Leopold I of Belgium
6. Leopold II of Belgium
13. Princess Louise of Orléans
3. Princess Louise of Belgium
14. Archduke Joseph, Palatine of Hungary
7. Archduchess Marie Henriette of Austria
15. Duchess Maria Dorothea of Württemberg
