= Princess Dorothea of Saxe-Coburg and Gotha =

Duchess of Schleswig-Holstein from 1898 to 1921

Princess Dorothea
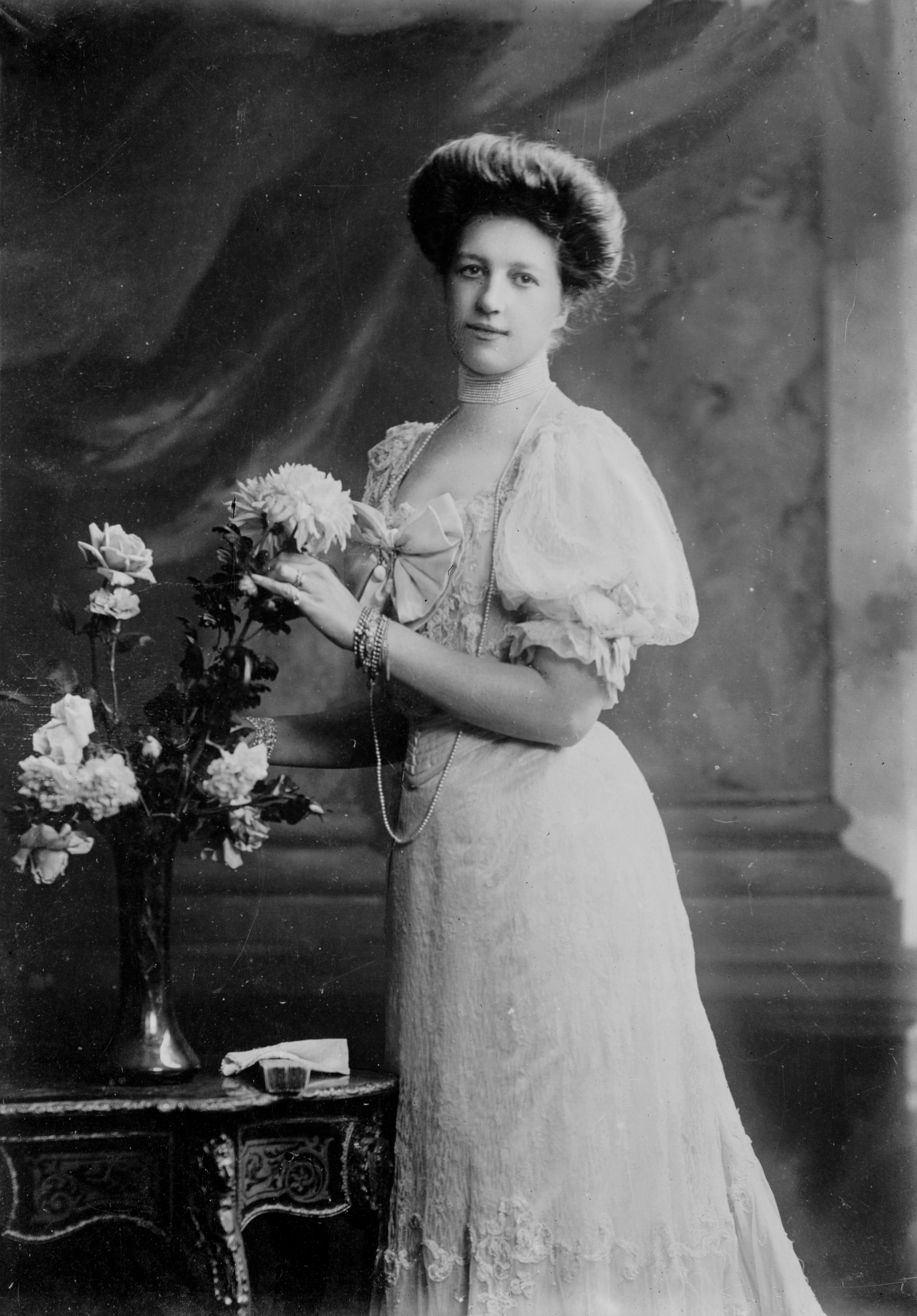
- Dorothea in 1900s

Duchess consort of Schleswig-Holstein
- Tenure: 2 August 1898 – 22 February 1921
- Born: 30 April 1881; Vienna, Austria-Hungary
- Died: 21 January 1967 (aged 85); Schloss Taxis, Dischingen, Baden-Württemberg, West Germany
- Burial: St. Augustin, Coburg
- Spouse: Ernst Gunther, Duke of Schleswig-Holstein (m. 1898; died 1921)
Names
- German: Dorothea Maria Henriette Auguste Louise
- House: Saxe-Coburg and Gotha-Koháry
- Father: Prince Philipp of Saxe-Coburg and Gotha
- Mother: Princess Louise of Belgium

Princess Dorothea Maria Henriette Auguste Louise of Saxe-Coburg and Gotha (30 April 1881 – 21 January 1967) was a princess of Saxe-Coburg and Gotha (German: Prinzessin von Sachsen-Coburg und Gotha) by birth and the duchess of Schleswig-Holstein (German: Herzogin zu Schleswig-Holstein) through her marriage to Ernst Gunther, duke of Schleswig-Holstein. Dorothea was born in Vienna, Austria, the second child and only daughter of Prince Philipp of Saxe-Coburg and Gotha and Princess Louise of Belgium.

== Marriage and children ==
Dorothea married Ernst Gunther, Duke of Schleswig-Holstein, fifth child and third-eldest son of Frederick VIII of Schleswig-Holstein and his wife Princess Adelheid of Hohenlohe-Langenburg, on 2 August 1898 in Coburg, Duchy of Saxe-Coburg and Gotha.

Dorothea and Ernst Gunther had no children. In 1920, they adopted Princess Marie Luise (1908–1969) and Prince Johann Georg of Schleswig-Holstein-Sonderburg-Glücksburg (1911–1941), son and daughter of Prince Albrecht of Schleswig-Holstein-Sonderburg-Glücksburg and his wife Countess Ortrud of Ysenburg und Büdingen. Marie Luise and Johann Georg were grandchildren of Friedrich, Duke of Schleswig-Holstein-Sonderburg-Glücksburg, an older brother of Christian IX of Denmark.

Princess Dorothea died at Schloss Taxis, Dischingen, Baden-Württemberg, Germany, aged 85.

== Ancestry ==
Ancestors of Princess Dorothea of Saxe-Coburg and Gotha

8. Prince Ferdinand of Saxe-Coburg and Gotha
4. Prince August of Saxe-Coburg and Gotha
9. Princess Maria Antonia Koháry of Csábrág and Szitnya
2. Prince Philipp of Saxe-Coburg and Gotha
10. Louis Philippe I of France
5. Princess Clémentine of Orléans
11. Princess Maria Amalia of Naples and Sicily
1. Princess Dorothea of Saxe-Coburg and Gotha
12. Leopold I of Belgium
6. Leopold II of Belgium
13. Princess Louise of Orléans
3. Princess Louise of Belgium
14. Archduke Joseph, Palatine of Hungary
7. Archduchess Marie Henriette of Austria
15. Duchess Maria Dorothea of Württemberg

== Sources ==
- La fortune de Dora. Une petite-fille de Léopold II chez les nazis (Olivier Defrance & Joseph van Loon, Racine, Brussels), 2013

Princess Dorothea of Saxe-Coburg and Gotha House of Saxe-Coburg and Gotha-Koháry Born: 30 April 1881 Died: 21 January 1967
Titles in pretence
Preceded by Princess Adelheid of Hohenlohe-Langenburg	— TITULAR — Duchess consort of Schleswig-Holstein; 2 August 1898 – 22 February 1921; Reason for succession failure: Duchy annexed by Prussia in 1866	Succeeded by Princess Caroline Mathilde of Schleswig-Holstein-Sonderburg-Augustenburg
