= Fachkrankenhaus Coswig =

Hospital in Coswig, Germany

Coordinates: 51.13°N 13.59°E

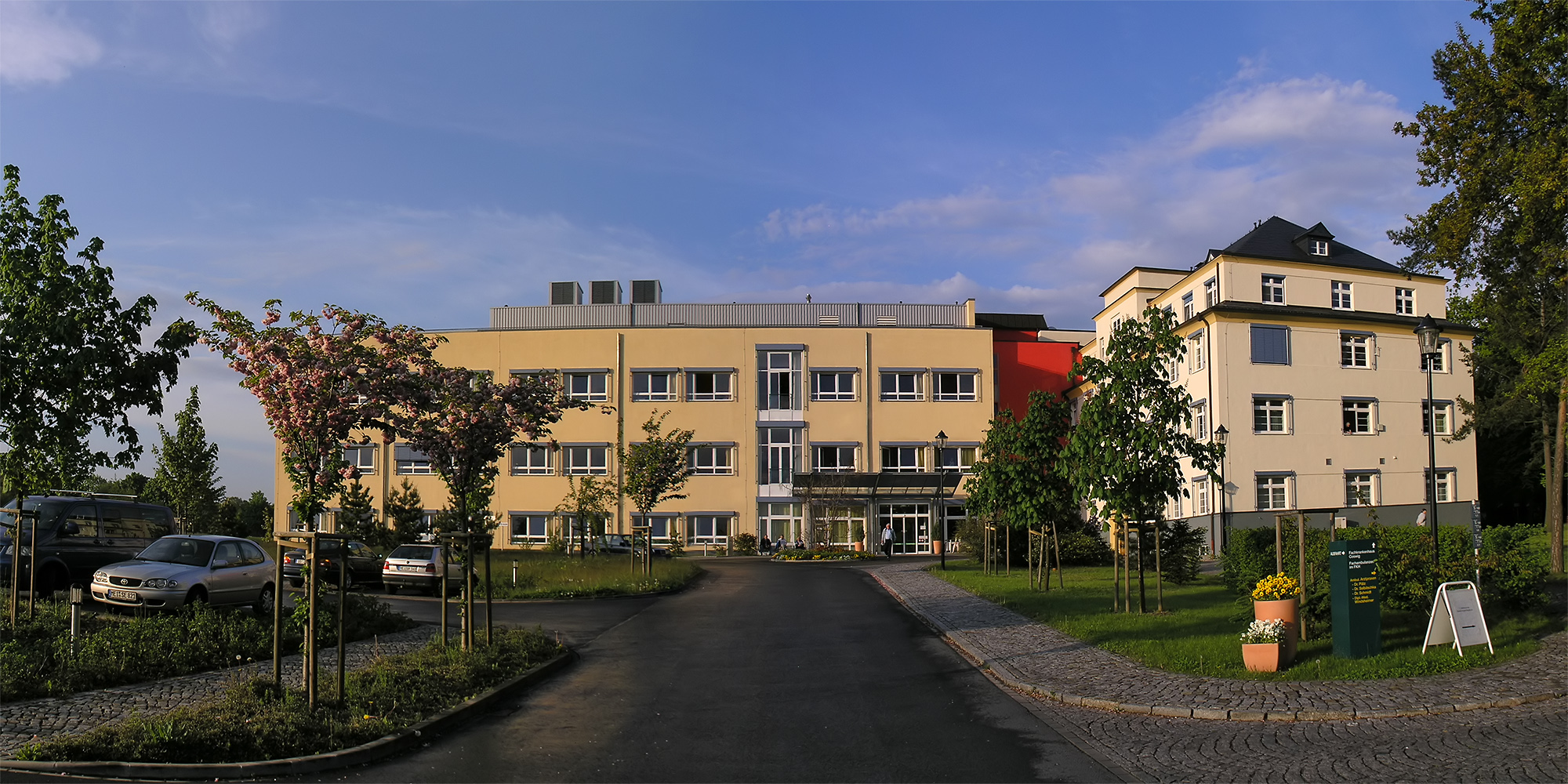
The main building was first built in 1931. A new wing (left) was added in 2004.

The Fachkrankenhaus Coswig (FKC) hospital is a clinic specializing in the treatment of bronchial and pulmonary diseases. In 2018, a total of approx. 8,000 patients were treated in the FKC hospital which has 171 beds.

== Fachkrankenhaus Coswig ==
The property is located at Neucoswiger Straße 21 in the Saxon city of Coswig. The entire historic building, which was built between 1890 and 1896, is officially listed as the historic landmark Heilstätte Lindenhof, i.e. Sanitarium Linden Court. Numerous individually listed structures and monuments are actually located on the premises, including the park which is a protected landscape garden.

== History ==
The Lindenhof, which was first officially mentioned in 1783, was purchased by the neurologist Friedrich Gustav Bräunlich (1800–1875) in 1845 who transformed the vineyard and estate into a psychiatric clinic. He had previously owned a sanitarium for the mentally ill called Wackerbarths Ruh' in the neighboring municipality of Niederlößnitz since 1835, which he closed after having moved to the new facility. On August 1, 1891, his Lindenhof was sold to a new owner, Reginald H. Pierson, who created a park and built patients' villas in the Swiss chalet style, a utility building, and a social center by 1892.
