= Coswig, Saxony =

Town in Saxony, Germany

Coswig
- Town
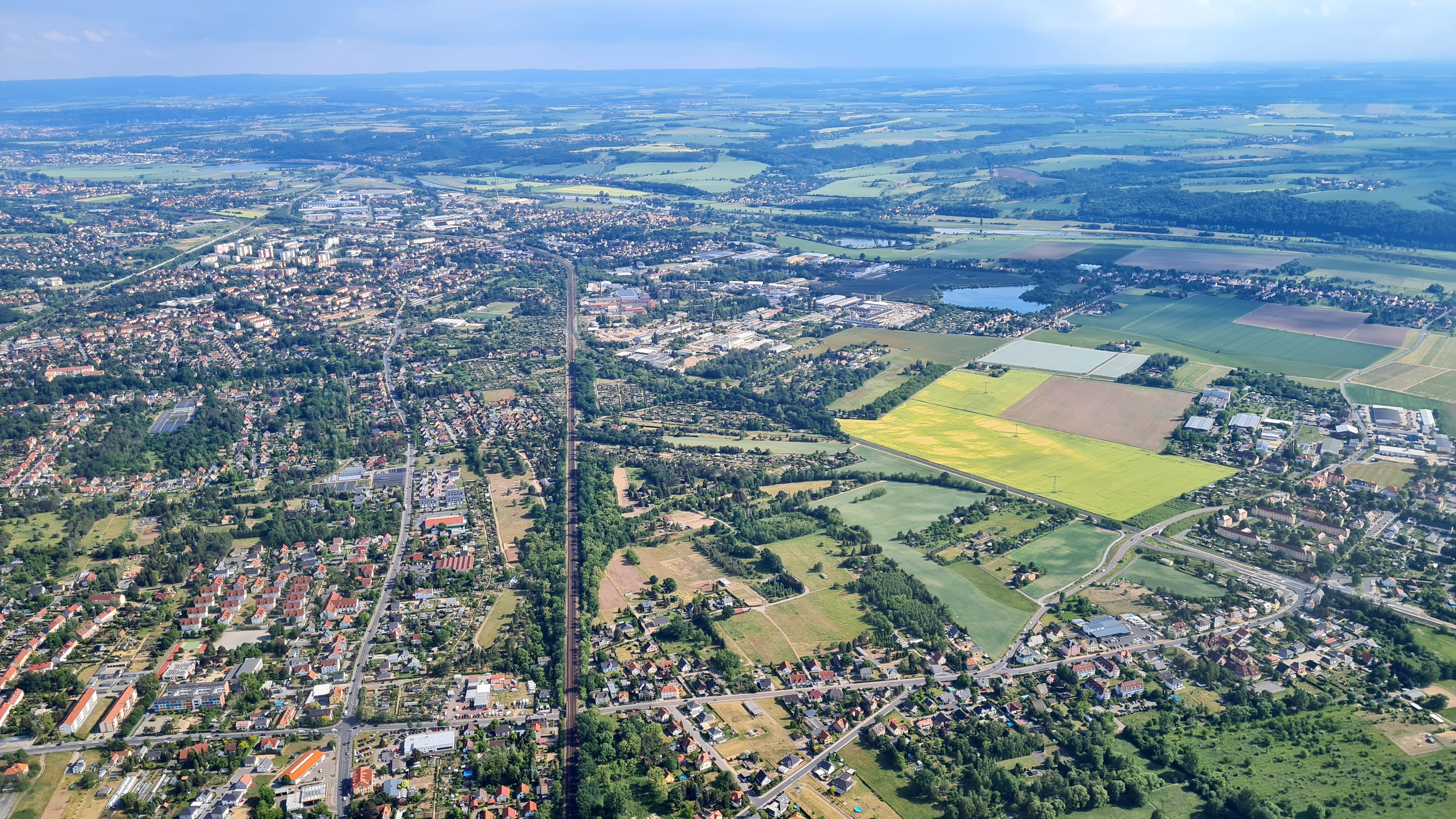

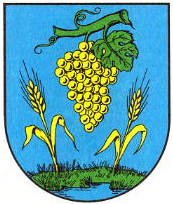
- Coat of arms

- Location of Coswig within Meißen district
- Interactive map of Coswig
- Location within Germany Location within Saxony
- Coordinates: 51°8′N 13°35′E
- Country: Germany
- State: Saxony
- District: Meißen
- Subdivisions: 5

Government
  - Mayor (2019–26): Thomas Schubert

Area
  - Total: 25.88 km^{2} (9.99 sq mi)
- Elevation: 118 m (387 ft)

Population (2025-12-31)
  - Total: 20,479
  - Density: 791.3/km^{2} (2,049/sq mi)
- Time zone: UTC+01:00 (CET)
  - Summer (DST): UTC+02:00 (CEST)
- Postal codes: 01631–01640
- Dialling codes: 03523
- Vehicle registration: MEI, GRH, RG, RIE
- Website: www.coswig.de

Coswig (German pronunciation: [ˈkɔsvɪç]; Upper Sorbian: Kosowiki) is a town in the district of Meißen, in Saxony, Germany. It is situated on the right bank of the Elbe, approximately 9 km southeast of Meißen, and 13 km northwest of Dresden. It is the home of Fachkrankenhaus Coswig, a hospital specializing in thoracic surgery.

The town can be reached from Dresden by Dresdner Verkehrsbetriebe's tram route 4, or from both Dresden and Meißen by Dresden S-Bahn line S1 and further regional railway lines at Coswig's railway station.

== Sights ==
- Villa Teresa, the home of Eugene d'Albert and Teresa Carreño in Coswig, now a museum

== Twin towns – sister cities ==
Coswig is twinned with:

- Lovosice, Czech Republic
- Ravensburg, Germany

== Notable people ==
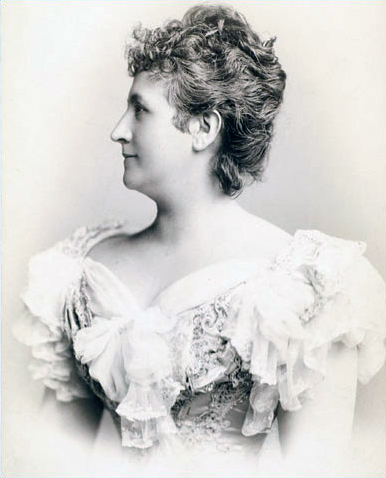
Teresa Carreño

- Monika Mrklas (born 1942), cross-country skier and cyclist
- Hans-Ulrich Thomale (born 1944), footballer and coach
- Heinz Werner (1928–2019), porcelain artist

=== Associated with Coswig ===
- Teresa Carreño (1853–1917), pianist, composer
- Eugene d'Albert (1864–1932), composer
