= Portrait of Edward VII =

Portrait of Edward VII or Portrait of Albert Edward, Prince of Wales may refer to:

- Portrait of Albert Edward, Prince of Wales (Winterhalter, 1846)
- Portrait of Albert Edward, Prince of Wales (Winterhalter, 1864)
- Coronation portrait of Edward VII (1902)
