= The Reception of Louis-Philippe at Windsor Castle =

Painting by Franz Xaver Winterhalter

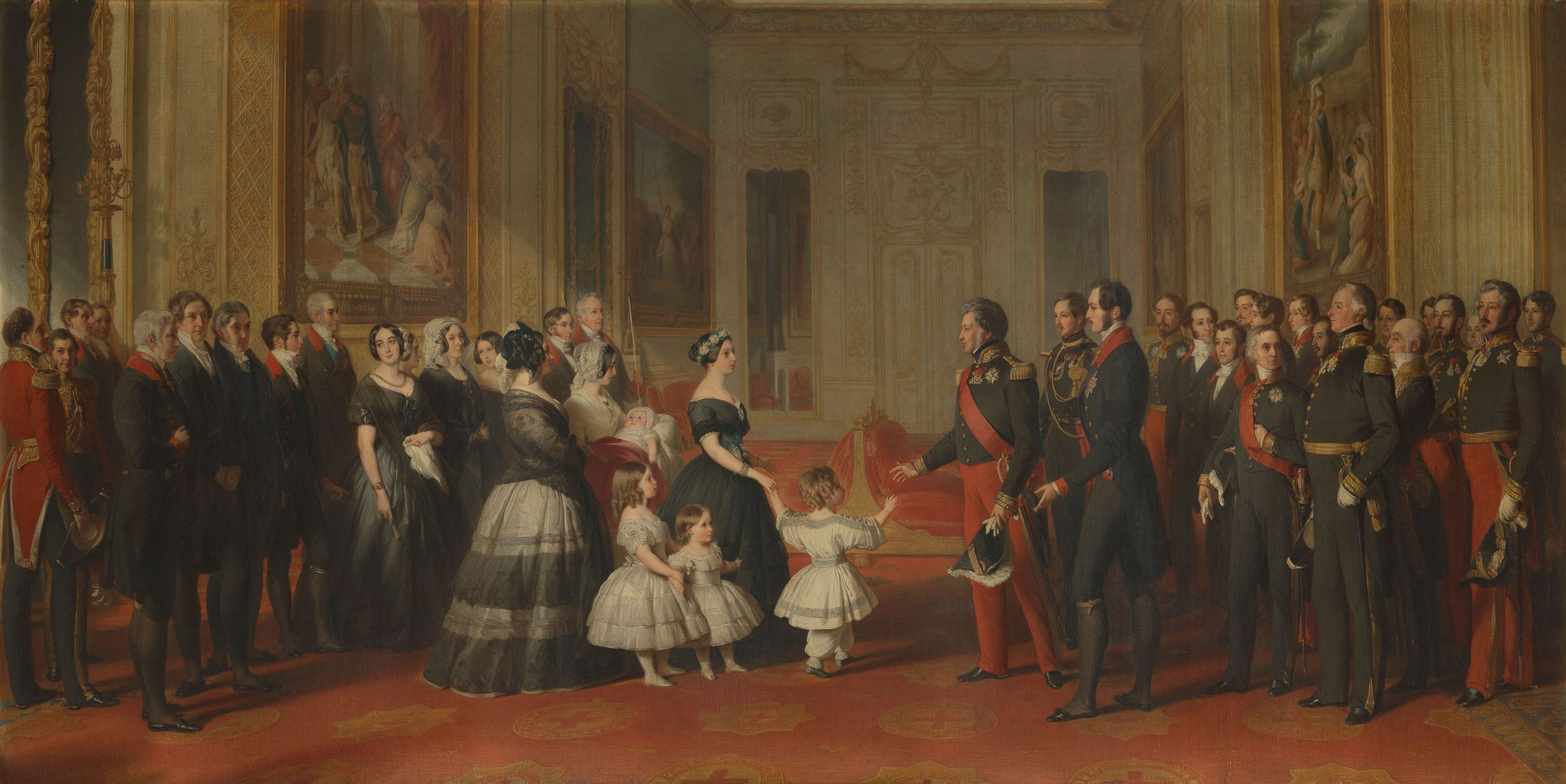
- Artist: Franz Xaver Winterhalter
- Year: 1847
- Type: Oil on canvas, history painting
- Dimensions: 345 cm × 480 cm (136 in × 190 in)
- Location: Palace of Versailles, Versailles

The Reception of Louis-Philippe at Windsor Castle (French: La reine Victoria présente ses enfants au roi Louis-Philippe à Windsor) is a history painting by the German artist Franz Xaver Winterhalter. It depicts the Queen Victoria receiving the French monarch Louis Philippe I at Windsor Castle on 8 October 1844 during his state visit to Britain. This was a major moment in the early Entente Cordiale between the two nations. The Queen is shown surrounded by her four eldest children including, the Princess Royal, the Prince of Wales, Princess Alice and Prince Alfred. Also present are her husband, Prince Albert, and her mother, the Duchess of Kent. Various members of the Tory government are standing behind her including the Prime Minister Robert Peel, Lord Aberdeen and the Duke of Wellington. Louis Philippe is accompanied by his influential Foreign Minister François Guizot.

The painting was commissioned in 1844 for fifteen thousand Francs by Louis-Philippe for the Musée de l'Histoire de France at the Palace of Versailles. It was displayed at the Salon of 1846 at the Louvre in Paris but not fully finished until the following year. A smaller, replica version was produced, likely commissioned by Queen Victoria, and is today in the Royal Collection.

== Bibliography ==
- Allen, Brian. The British Portrait, 1660-1960. Antique Collectors' Club, 1991. ISBN 1851491074.
- Mansel, Phillip. Dressed to Rule: Royal and Court Costume from Louis XIV to Elizabeth II. Yale University Press, 2005. ISBN 0300244509.
