= Portrait of Empress Elisabeth of Austria =

Painting by Franz Xaver Winterhalter

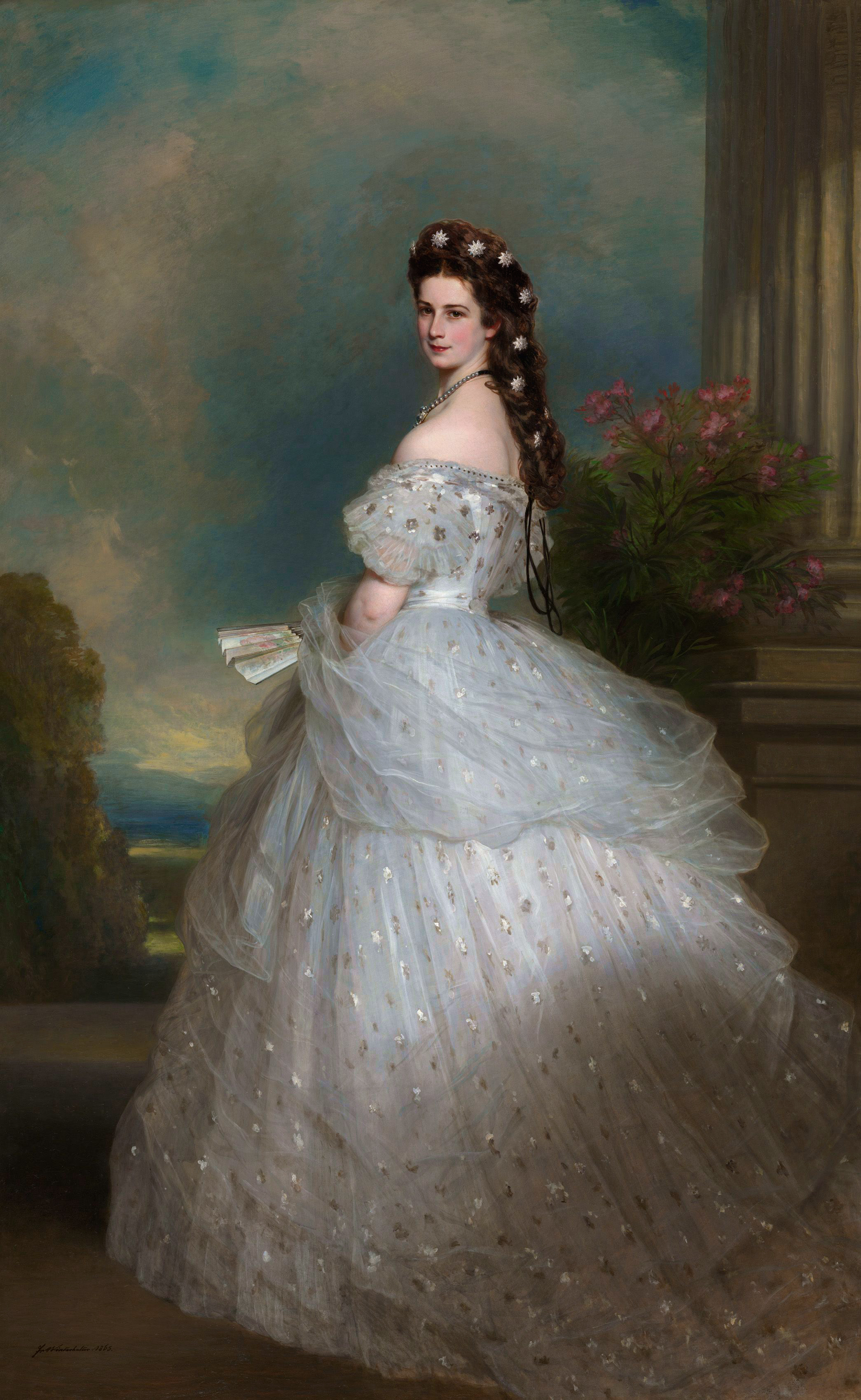
- Artist: Franz Xaver Winterhalter
- Year: 1865
- Type: Oil on canvas, portrait painting
- Dimensions: 255 cm × 133 cm (100 in × 52 in)
- Location: Kunsthistorisches Museum, Vienna

Portrait of Empress Elisabeth of Austria is an oil on canvas portrait painting by the German artist Franz Xaver Winterhalter, from 1865. The painting is part of the collection of the Kunsthistorisches Museum, in Vienna.

== History and description ==
It depicts Elisabeth in Bavaria, Empress of Austria from 1854 to 1898. She is depicted in a courtly gala dress with star shaped diamond hairpins. This portrait presents the Empress in a romantic fashion, enhancing her reputation as one of the great beauties of her time. The composition, almost full-length, shows the empress in an elegant, sensual pose. She is holding a fan, looking over her left shoulder, slightly diverting the viewer's gaze, which gives the image an air of subtle detachment and mystery. The background is relatively neutral, with two columns on the right and a plant on the left, usually identified as oleander, suggesting a palatial or monumental setting, but without diverting attention from the main figure.

The Empress's gala dress is believed to have been created by Charles Frederick Worth, the most renowned couturier of the second half of the 19th century. The garment, made of white satin and tulle, is covered with thousands of silver leaf stars that shimmer beneath the translucent layer of tulle. The dress also features embroidery with precious stones and pearls, giving it a dazzling appearance. The design has an off-the-shoulder neckline and a fitted bodice, a style that, according to the magazine Les Modes Parisiennes of May 6, 1865, was frequently made of tulle. The Empress's hairstyle consists of long braids coiled on top of her head as if forming a natural crown, decorated with diamond stars, which reinforces the idea of majesty and luxury of the Viennese court. Sissi's natural crown was imitated more often than any other aspect of her appearance. The Empress herself referred to her hairstyle as "her trademark".

This portrait is one of Empress Elisabeth's most iconic representations and one of Winterhalter's best-known works. A landscape opens in front of her.

Winterhalter was a celebrated portraitist, known for his depictions of French and British royalty in particular. He arrived in Vienna in September 1864 to produce this and a pendant painting of Elisabeth's husband Franz Joseph I.

== Bibliography ==
- Ormond, Richard & Blackett-Ord, Carol. Franz Xaver Winterhalter and the Courts of Europe, 1830-70. National Portrait Gallery, 1988. ISBN 0810939649.
