= Queen Victoria (Winterhalter) =

Painting by Franz Xaver Winterhalter

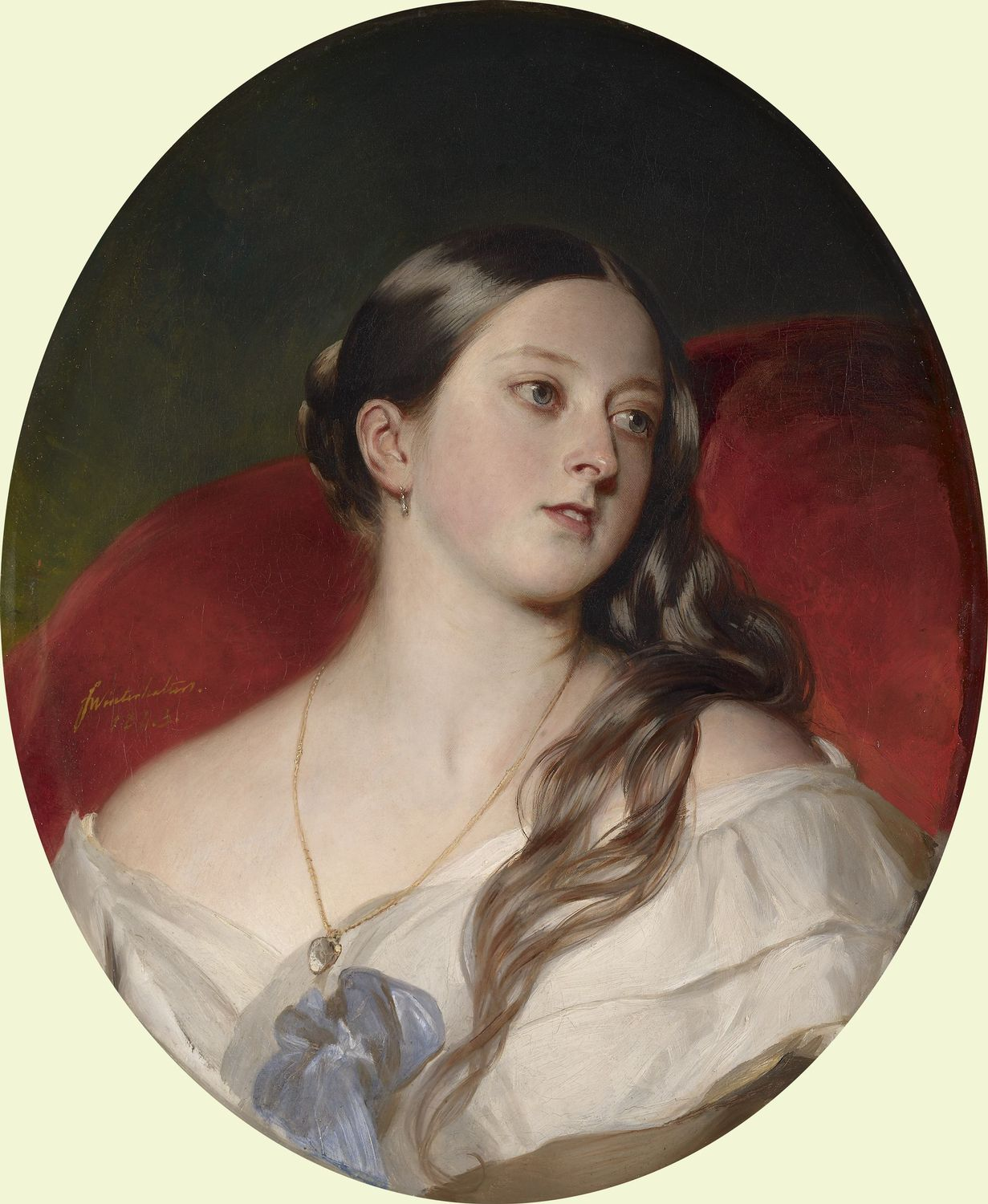
- Artist: Franz Xaver Winterhalter
- Year: 1843
- Medium: Oil on canvas
- Dimensions: 64.8 cm × 53.3 cm (25.5 in × 21.0 in)
- Location: Royal Collection

Queen Victoria is an oil on canvas painting by German artist Franz Xaver Winterhalter, created in 1843. It depicts British Queen Victoria in her young years, at the beginning of her long reign. The work is part of the Royal Collection.

== History and description ==
Winterhalter not only painted the official portraits of the British royal house but also dedicated himself to producing private images, as is the case with this work that was commissioned as a surprise gift from Queen Victoria to her husband Prince Albert on the occasion of his twenty-fourth birthday. Albert well appreciated the portrait. Victoria wrote in her journal on 26 August 1843: "I felt so happy and proud to have found something that gave him so much pleasure". The painting was hung in Prince Albert's despatch room at Windsor Castle.

The painting is of small dimensions and depicts the queen in an intimate moment, in a minimally painted white ruffled dress. The only detail of the ornament is the purple ribbon and jewels, a pair of simple earrings, and a heart-shaped pendant on a gold chain. This pendant could be the heart-shaped glass locket containing a lock of Prince Albert's hair that the Queen wore day and night before her wedding. The young Victoria appears with her head lying on a red cushion, with a part of her brown hair half unravelled and falling over her dress, looking to her right with an expectant look. It can be considered that the portrait is an expression of the love she felt for her husband.
