= The Royal Family (Winterhalter portrait) =

1846 painting by Franz Xaver Winterhalter

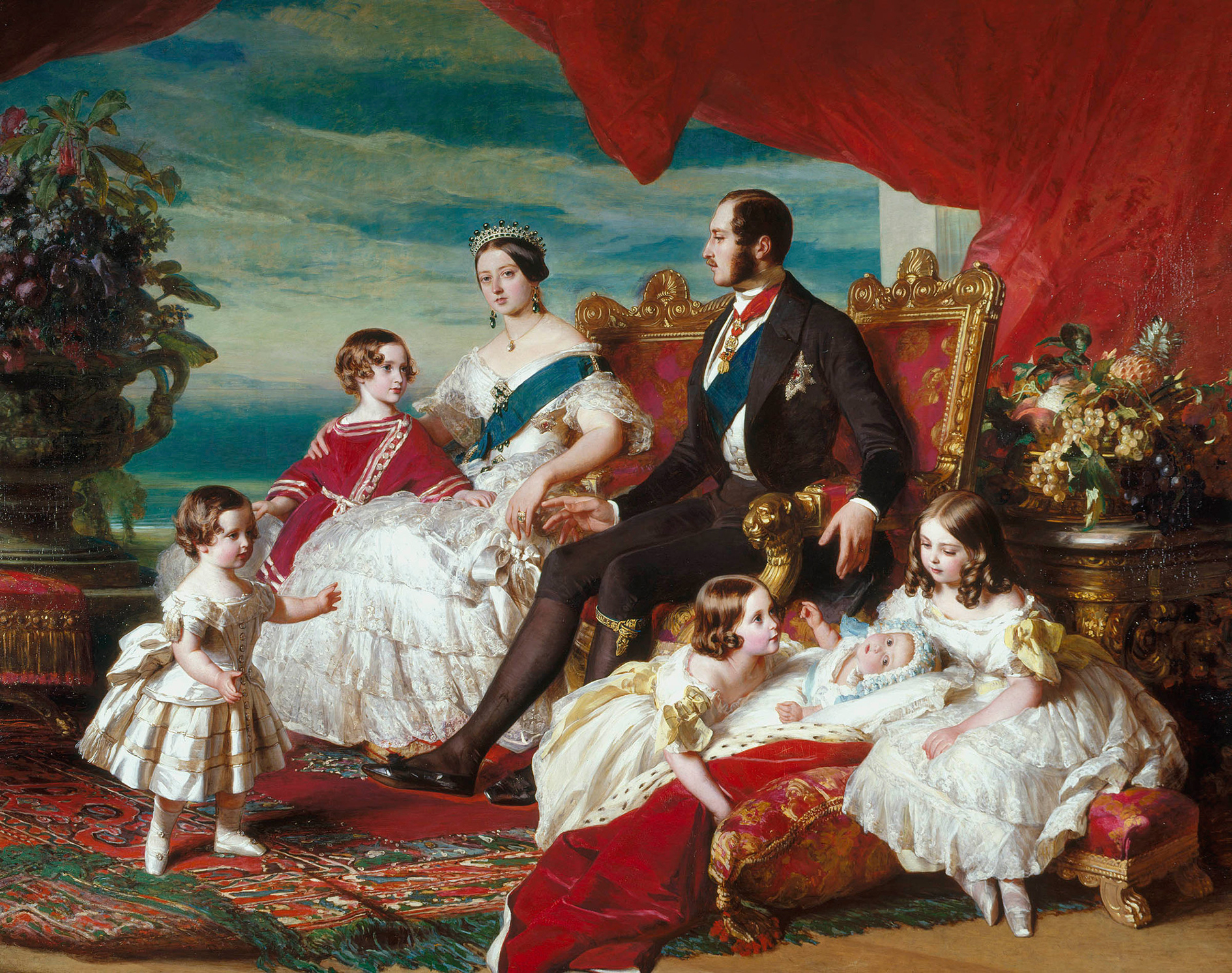
- Artist: Franz Xaver Winterhalter
- Year: 1846
- Type: Oil on canvas, historical painting
- Dimensions: 250.5 cm × 317.3 cm (98.6 in × 124.9 in)
- Location: East Gallery, Buckingham Palace, London

The Royal Family is an 1846 painting by the German artist Franz Xaver Winterhalter. It depicts Queen Victoria, reigning monarch of the United Kingdom, and her consort Prince Albert along with their five eldest children.

In May 1846, the Queen asked Louis Philippe I, King of the French that, despite his role as court painter, Winterhalter be released from his duties to complete a portrait of her family. The family sat multiple times for the portrait between October 1846 and January 1847. Upon finishing, it was hung in the Dining Room at Osborne House and then publicly displayed at St James' Palace where it had 100,000 visitors. The Queen herself was satisfied with the results, calling it a "chef d'oeuvre", and her views were shared by her close circle. At the time, however, the press gave a less favorable review of the painting, pointing out its "coarse handling" and the "sensual and fleshy" depiction of Victoria and Albert. Another source of grievance was the Queen's choice in selecting a German artist rather than an English one. An engraving was later produced by Samuel Cousins in 1850 which is now in the Government Art Collection.

The portrait itself was meant to emphasise the sense of family harmony while utilizing elements of royal status in the form of jewels and attire. Albert Edward, Prince of Wales is depicted in a Russian blouse next to his mother, while his younger brother Prince Alfred (unbreeched at two years) takes a step in the foreground. The eldest of all five children, Victoria, Princess Royal, is on the far right and with Princess Alice they look over Princess Helena. Queen Victoria wears an emerald and diamond diadem, drop earrings and three brooches while Prince Albert wears court dress. They also wear the ribbon and star of the Order of the Garter, with Albert also donning the badge of the Golden Fleece.
