= Portrait of Franz Joseph I =

Painting by Franz Xaver Winterhalter

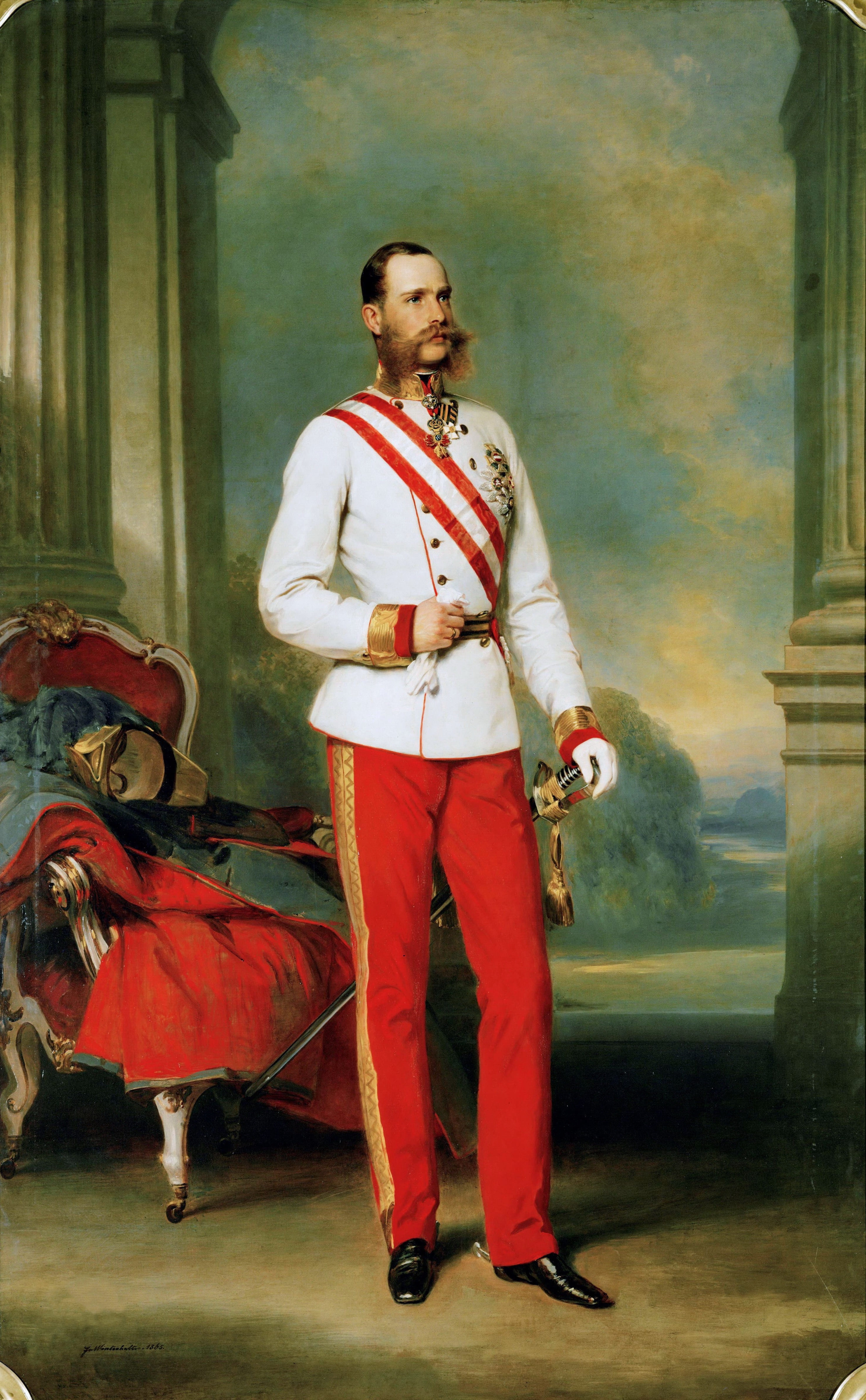
- Artist: Franz Xaver Winterhalter
- Year: 1865
- Type: Oil on canvas, portrait painting
- Dimensions: 255 cm × 133 cm (100 in × 52 in)
- Location: Hofburg Palace; Vienna

Portrait of Franz Joseph I is an 1865 portrait painting by the German artist Franz Xaver Winterhalter. It depicts Franz Joseph I, Emperor of Austria from 1848 to 1916. Following the Revolution of 1848, Franz Joseph had replaced his uncle Ferdinand I on the throne. His reign lasted in the First World War. He is depicted in the uniform of a field marshal, wearing the Order of Maria Theresa and Order of the Golden Fleece as well as other decorations.

Winterhalter was a celebrated portraitist, known for his depictions of French and British royalty in particular. He arrived in Vienna in September 1864 to produce this and a pendant painting of the Emperor's wife Empress Elisabeth of Austria. The painting is part of the collection of the Kunsthistorisches Museum and is on display at the Hofburg in Vienna.

== Bibliography ==
- Badea-Päun, Gabriel. The Society Portrait: Painting, Prestige and the Pursuit of Elegance. Thames & Hudson, 2007. ISBN 0500238421.
- Fichtner, Paula Sutter. Historical Dictionary of Austria. Bloomsbury Publishing, 2009. ISBN 0810855925.
- Ormond, Richard & Blackett-Ord, Carol. Franz Xaver Winterhalter and the Courts of Europe, 1830-70. National Portrait Gallery, 1988. ISBN 0810939649.
