= Portrait of Louise of Orléans =

Painting by Franz Xaver Winterhalter

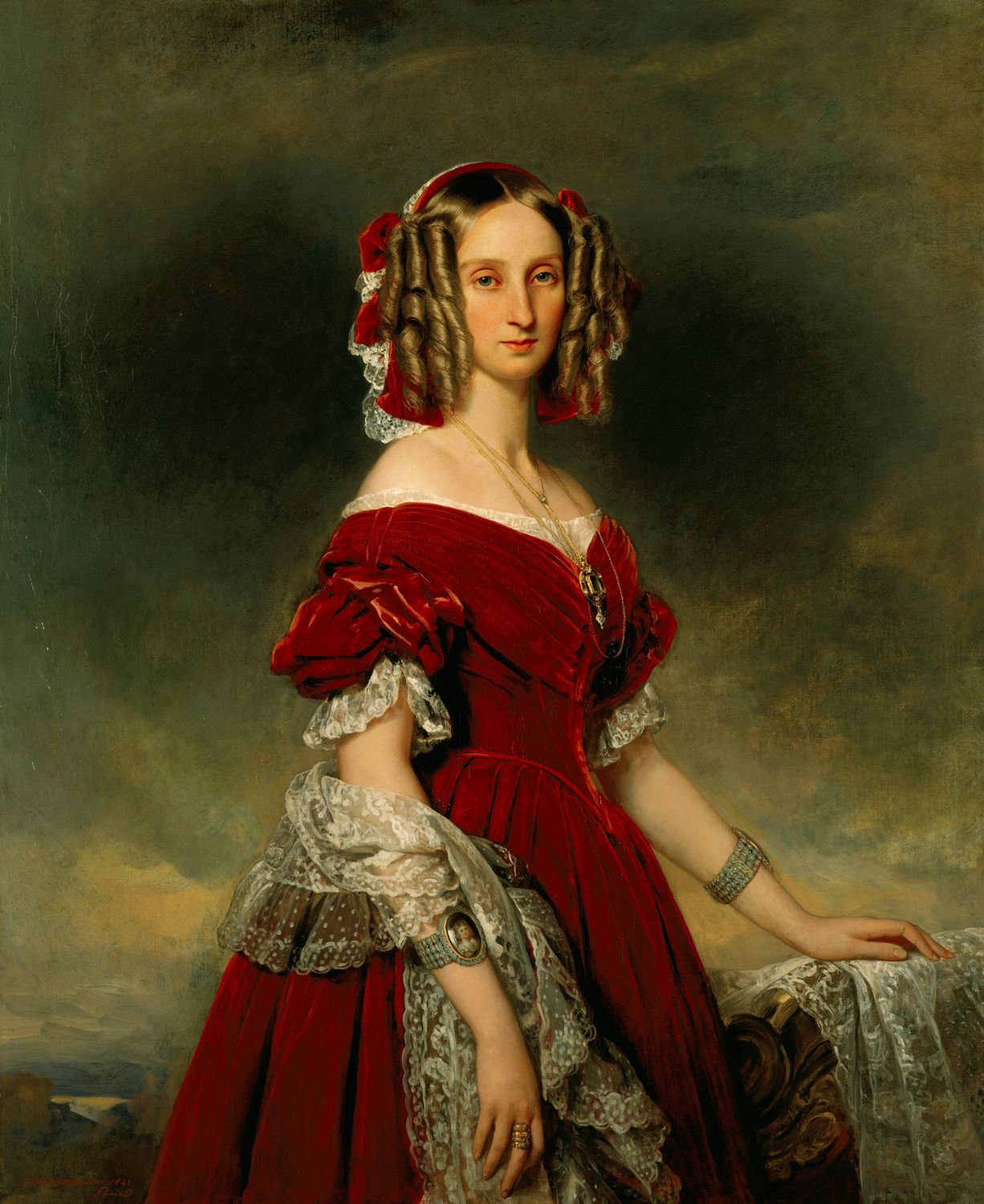
- Artist: Franz Xaver Winterhalter
- Year: 1841
- Type: Oil on canvas, portrait painting
- Dimensions: 121.5 cm × 98.6 cm (47.8 in × 38.8 in)
- Location: Royal Collection

Portrait of Louise of Orléans is an 1841 portrait painting by the German painter Franz Xaver Winterhalter. It depicts Louise of Orléans, the French Queen of the Belgians. A member of the House of Orléans she was the eldest daughter of Louis Philippe I of France. In 1832 she married Leopold I who had come to the throne following the Belgian Revolution of 1830. She had several children with him including the future Leopold II of Belgium and Charlotte, Empress of Mexico before her death from tuberculosis in 1850.

Winterhalter was known for his elegant pictures of European royalty. He portrays Louise wearing the fashionable ringlets of the era and a bracelet featuring a miniature of her elder son. A full-length version is in the Belgian Royal Collection. The painting was owned by her sister-in-law the Duchess of Kent then passed from her to her daughter Queen Victoria and today remains in the Royal Collection. It was Louise who brought Winterhalter to the attention of the British court, for whom he worked successfully.

An earlier painting by Winterhalter of the Queen with her eldest son is also in the Royal Collection at Buckingham Palace. It was produced in 1838 while he was working in Paris.

== Bibliography ==
- Eismann, Ingeborg. Franz Xaver Winterhalter (1805-1873): der Fürstenmaler Europas. ISBN 3865682030.
