= The First of May 1851 =

Painting by Franz Xaver Winterhalter

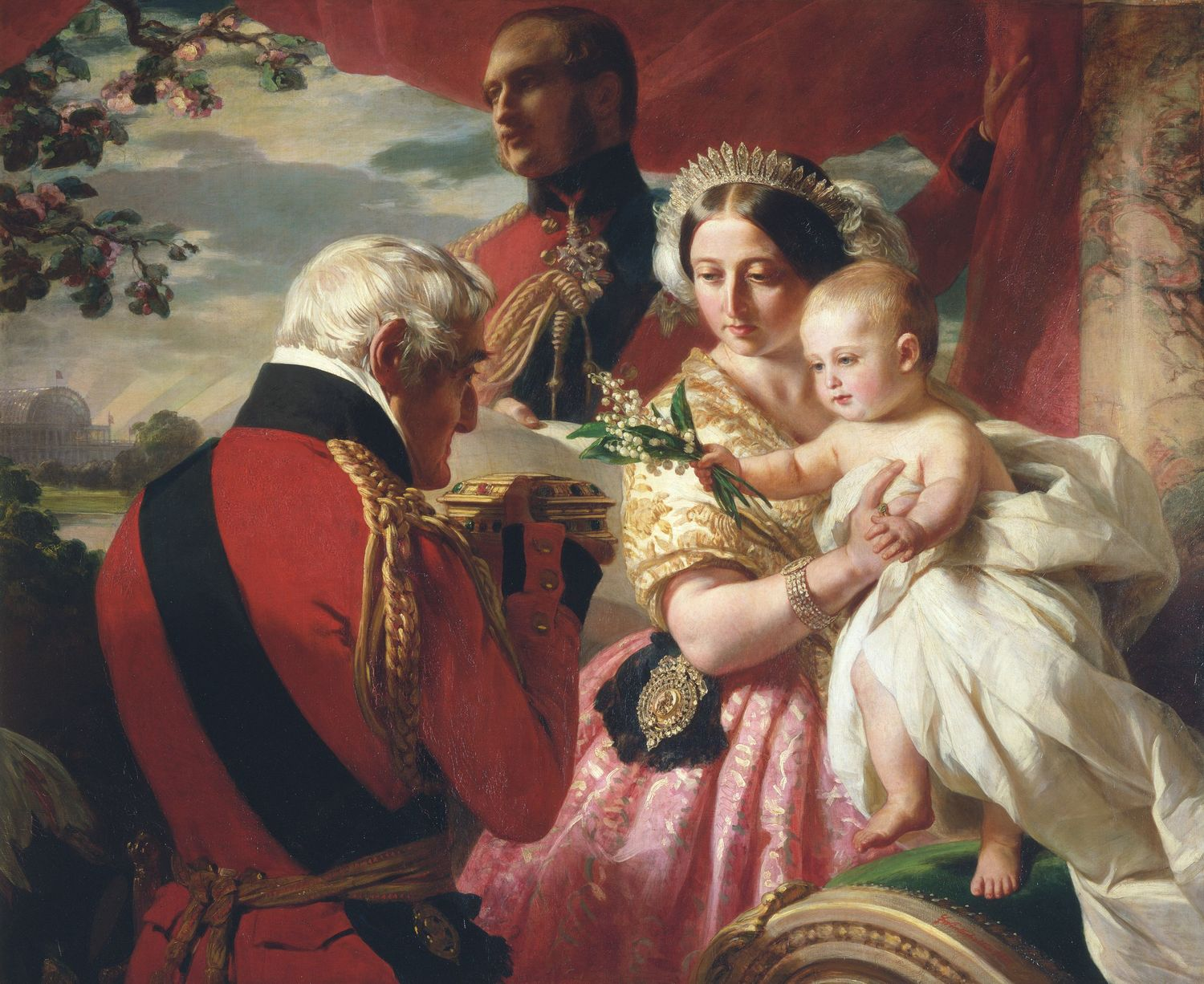
- Artist: Franz Xaver Winterhalter
- Year: 1851
- Type: Oil on canvas, history painting
- Dimensions: 107 cm × 130 cm (42 in × 51 in)
- Location: Royal Collection, Windsor Castle

The First of May 1851 is an oil painting by the German artist Franz Xaver Winterhalter. Combining history painting and portraiture it commemorates a scene at Buckingham Palace on 1 May 1851. The Duke of Wellington is shown bringing a gift to his godson Prince Arthur on his birthday. The Prince in turn holds out a lily of the valley, a flower associated with May Day. His parents Queen Victoria and Prince Albert are shown behind him. The composition of the painting draws inspiration from the Adoration of the Magi.

Known for his victories in the Peninsular War and at the Battle of Waterloo, Wellington had later served as Prime Minister. By the time of the exhibition's remained an influential figure and informal advisor to the Queen. He died in September of the following year.

The Crystal Palace that hosted the Great Exhibition in Hyde Park is shown in the background of the picture. The work was commissioned by Victoria and in 1863 was hanging Grand Corridor at Windsor Castle. The painting remains in the Royal Collection.

== History ==
Arthur was born on 1 May 1850 as the seventh child and third son of Victoria and Albert. According to Victoria, she suggested the idea of The First of May 1851 to Winterhalter - a German employed as a court painter for Victoria and other European royal houses. She, however, said that he "did not seem to know how to carry it out, so dear Albert with his wonderful knowledge and taste, gave [Winterhalter] the idea". The title alludes to the fact both Arthur and the Duke of Wellington were born on May 1, and the Great Exhibition opened on 1 May 1851.

When Victoria showed a print of the painting to painter David Roberts in November 1851, he determined that Winterhalter's painting was not adequate enough. In the original design, the Duke of Wellington's gift to Arthur was a gold cup and model of the royal throne. At the suggestion of Albert, it was replaced with a jewel casket for aesthetic reasons. The switch caused some confusion as Arthur came to believe the casket was a birthday present intended to be open on his 21st birthday in 1871. He enquired into this in a letter sent to Victoria in 1871, but she replied that "it is utterly without any foundation…Dear Papa and Winterhalter wished it to represent an Event…it only shows how wrong it is not to paint things as they really are." The painting, however, accurately reflects the cloths and jewelry she wore to the opening of the Great Exhibition.

== Bibliography ==
- Auerbach, Jeffrey A. The Great Exhibition of 1851: A Nation on Display. Yale University Press, 1999. ISBN 0300080077.
- Sinnema, Peter W. The Wake of Wellington: Englishness in 1852. Ohio University Press, 2006. ISBN 0821416790.
