= Portrait of Empress Eugénie =

Painting by Franz Xaver Winterhalter

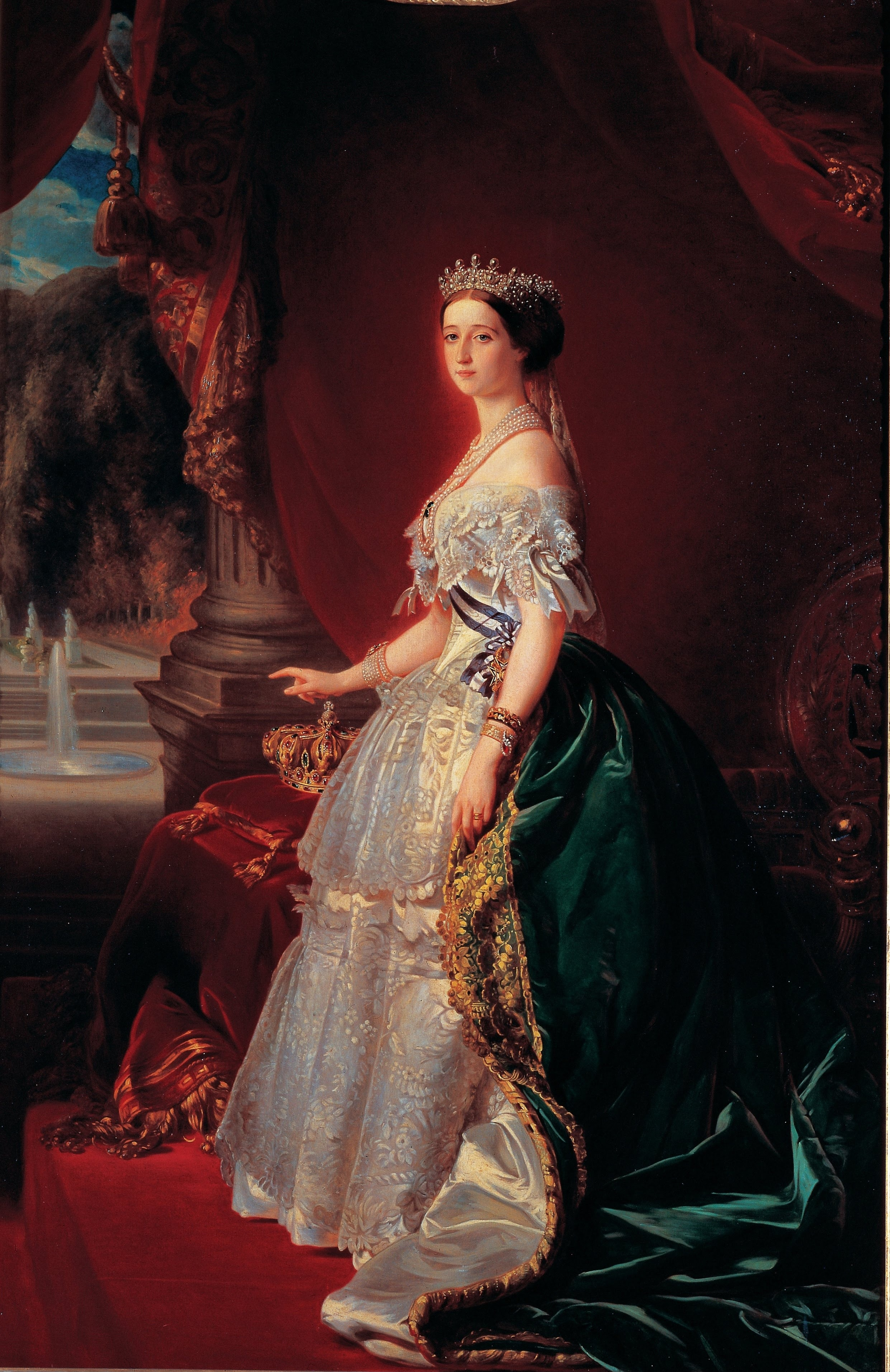
- Artist: Franz Xaver Winterhalter
- Year: 1853
- Medium: Oil on canvas
- Dimensions: 240 cm × 155 cm (94 in × 61 in)
- Location: lost, several copies extant

Portrait of Empress Eugénie was an oil on canvas painting by the German portrait painter Franz Xaver Winterhalter, created in 1853. It was an official portrait of the French Empress Eugénie de Montijo, whose husband Napoleon III reigned as Emperor of the Second French Empire from 1852 to 1870. The work had the dimensions of 240 cm high and 155 cm wide. The original portrait was lost in a fire in the Tuileries Palace, in Paris, in 1871, but is known because it was largely copied by other painters during Napoleon III's reign.

== History and description ==
Winterhalter had the reputation of being a leading portrait for the Royalty of Europe when he was commissioned to create two paintings of the emperor and his wife, Eugénie de Montijo, in 1852. In this painting Eugénie wears her state robes, the ribbon of the Order of Queen Maria Luisa and some of the pearl jewels from the Crown Collection.

The original portrait hung in the Tuileries Palace in Paris. Between 1855 and 1870, various versions of this portrait were made by various painters to decorate official buildings in France. The original work, and that of the emperor, was lost in the fire in this palace during the Paris Commune on May 23, 1871.

Two studies for the portraits of Napoleon III and Eugénie de Montijo, made by Winterhalter and his studio in 1853, were discovered in two private collections, respectively in Italy and in Denmark, and auctioned at Christie's on 2 October 2013.
