= Portrait of Albert Edward, Prince of Wales (Winterhalter, 1864) =

Painting by Franz Xaver Winterhalter

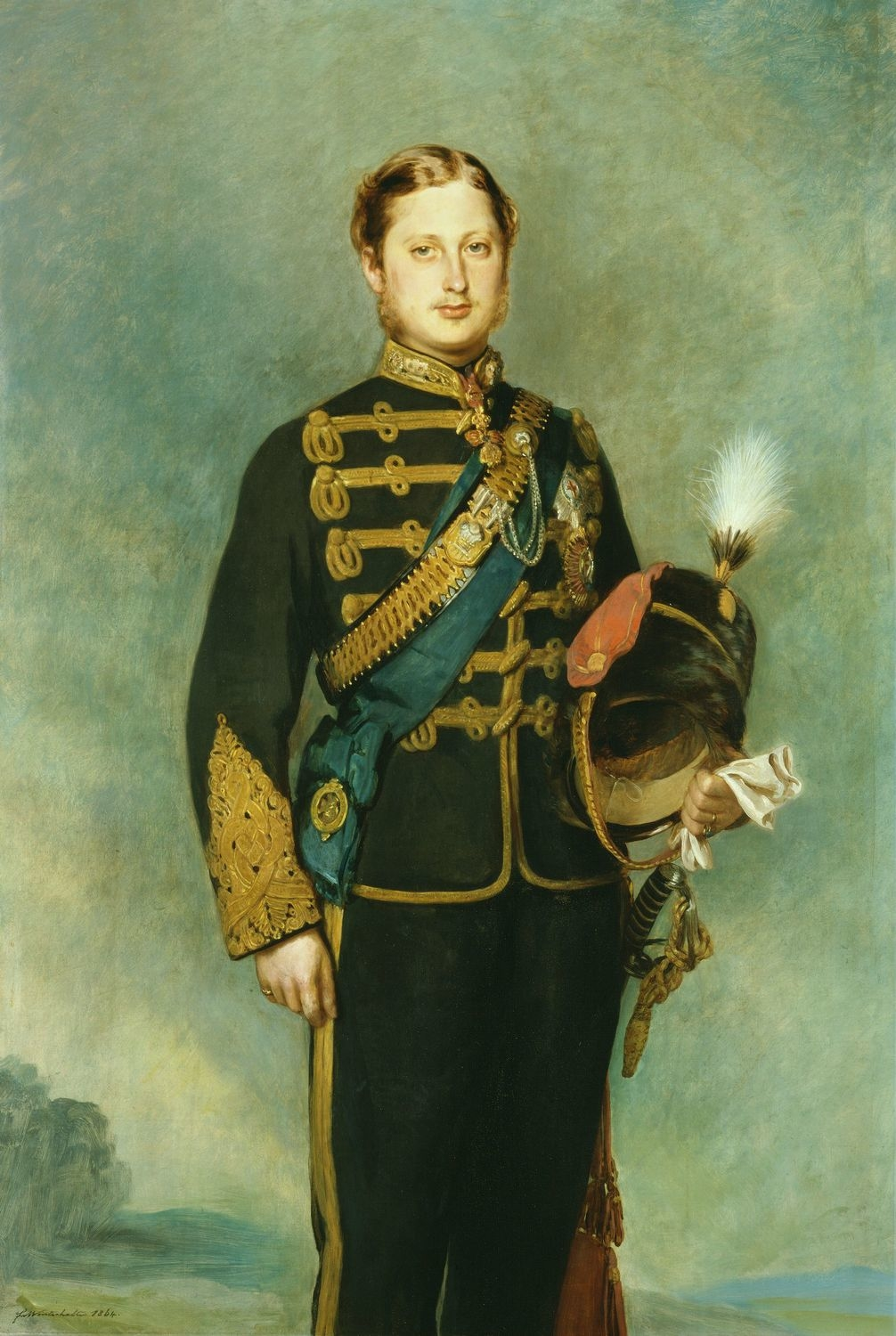
- Artist: Franz Xaver Winterhalter
- Year: 1864
- Type: Oil on canvas, portrait painting
- Dimensions: 161.8 cm × 114.1 cm (63.7 in × 44.9 in)
- Location: Royal Collection

Portrait of Albert Edward, Prince of Wales is an 1864 portrait painting by the German artist Franz Xaver Winterhalter. It depicts Albert Edward, then Prince of Wales, who would eventually ascend the throne as Edward VII. He had been married to Alexandra of Denmark the previous year. As a dynastic match it linked him, the son and heir of Queen Victoria, with Alexandra, the daughter of Christian IX of Denmark.

Winterhalter had previously painted a full-length portrait of Albert Edward in 1846. The new portrait was commissioned by Queen Victoria and was hanging in the Crimson Drawing Room at Windsor Castle in 1878. It remains in the Royal Collection today.

== Bibliography ==
- Scott, Jennifer Anne. The Royal Portrait: Image and Impact. Royal Collection Publications, 2010 ISBN 1905686137.
