= Franz Xaver Winterhalter =

German painter and lithographer (1805–1873)

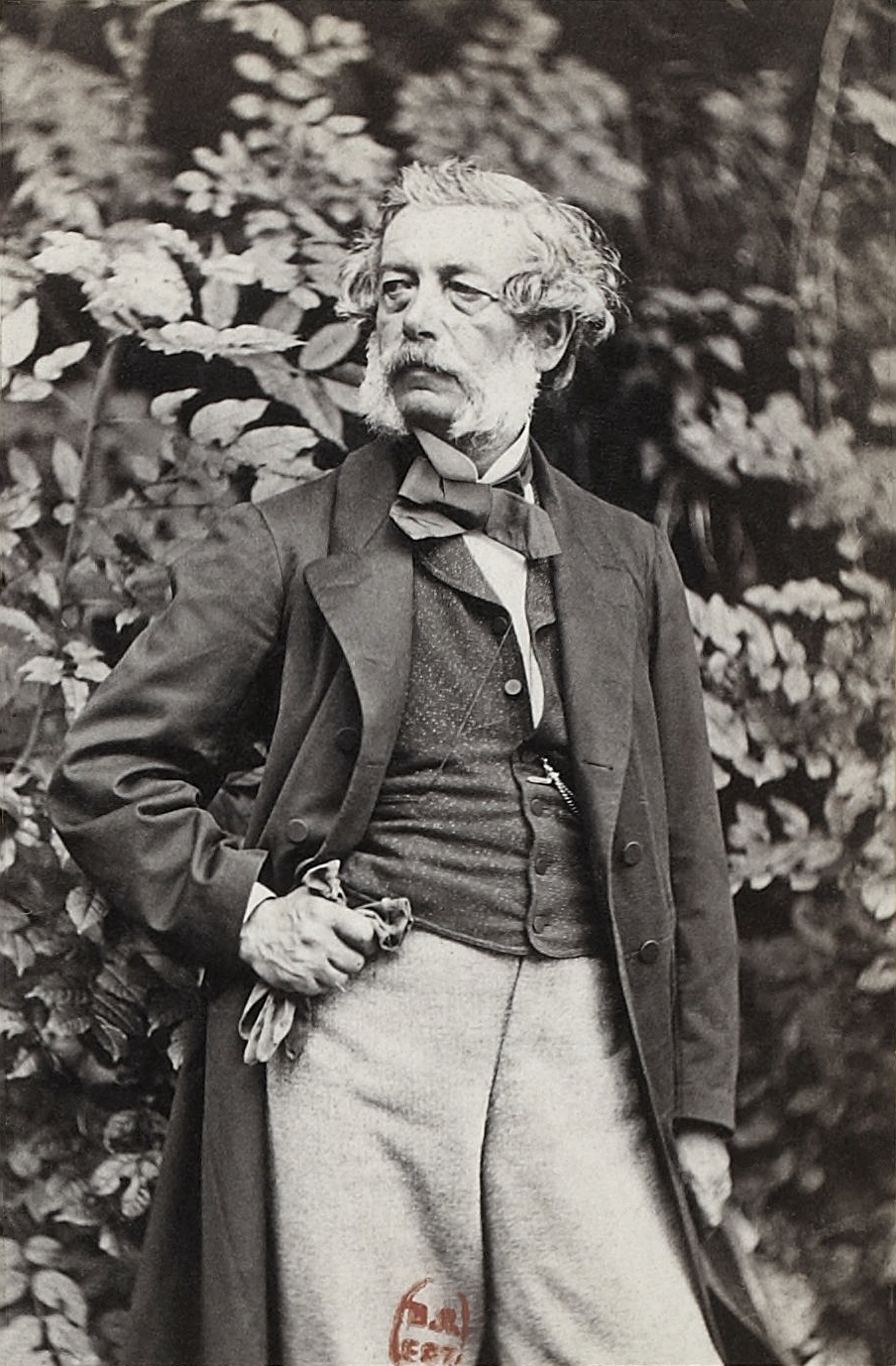
- Winterhalter in 1865
- Born: 20 April 1805; Menzenschwand, Modena-Breisgau
- Died: 8 July 1873 (aged 68); Frankfurt am Main, Germany
- Known for: Painting, lithography

Franz Xaver Winterhalter (20 April 1805 – 8 July 1873) was a German painter and lithographer, known for his flattering portraits of royalty and upper-class society in the mid-19th century. His name has become associated with fashionable court portraiture. Among his best known works are Empress Eugénie Surrounded by her Ladies in Waiting (1855) and the portraits he made of Empress Elisabeth of Austria (1865).

== Early years ==
Franz Xaver Winterhalter was born in the small village of Menzenschwand (now part of Sankt Blasien), in Germany's Black Forest, on 20 April 1805. He was the sixth child of Fidel Winterhalter (1773–1863), a farmer and resin producer in the village, and his wife Eva Meyer (1765–1838), a member of a long established Menzenschwand family. His father was of peasant stock and was a powerful influence in his life. Of the eight brothers and sisters, only four survived infancy. Throughout his life Franz Xaver remained very close to his family, in particular to his brother Hermann (1808–1891), who was also a painter.

After attending school at a Benedictine monastery in St. Blasien, Winterhalter left Menzenschwand in 1818 at the age of 13 to study drawing and engraving. He trained as a draughtsman and lithographer in the workshop of Karl Ludwig Schüler (1785–1852) in Freiburg im Breisgau. In 1823, at the age of 18, he went to Munich, sponsored by the industrialist Baron von Eichtal (1775–1850). In 1825, he was granted a stipend by Louis I, Grand Duke of Baden (1763–1830) and began a course of study at the Academy of Fine Arts, Munich with Peter von Cornelius (1783–1867), whose academic methods made him uncomfortable. Winterhalter found a more congenial mentor in the fashionable portraitist Joseph Karl Stieler (1781–1858). During this time, he supported himself working as lithographer.

Winterhalter entered court circles when in 1828 he became drawing master to Sophie, Margravine of Baden, at Karlsruhe. His opportunity to establish himself beyond southern Germany came in 1832 when he was able to travel to Italy, 1833–1834, with the support of Grand Duke Leopold of Baden. In Rome he composed romantic genre scenes in the manner of Louis Léopold Robert and attached himself to the circle of the director of the Académie des Beaux-Arts, Horace Vernet. On his return to Karlsruhe he painted portraits of the Grand Duke Leopold of Baden and his wife, and was appointed painter to the grand-ducal court.

Nevertheless, he left Baden to move to France, where his Italian genre scene Il dolce Farniente attracted notice at the Salon of 1836. Il Decameron a year later was also praised; both paintings are academic compositions in the style of Raphael. In the Salon of 1838 he exhibited a portrait of the Prince of Wagram with his young daughter. His career as a portrait painter was soon secured when in the same year he painted Louise of Orléans, Queen of the Belgians, and her son. It was probably through this painting that Winterhalter came to the notice of Maria Amalia of the Two Sicilies, Queen of the French, mother of the Queen of the Belgians.

== Court painter ==
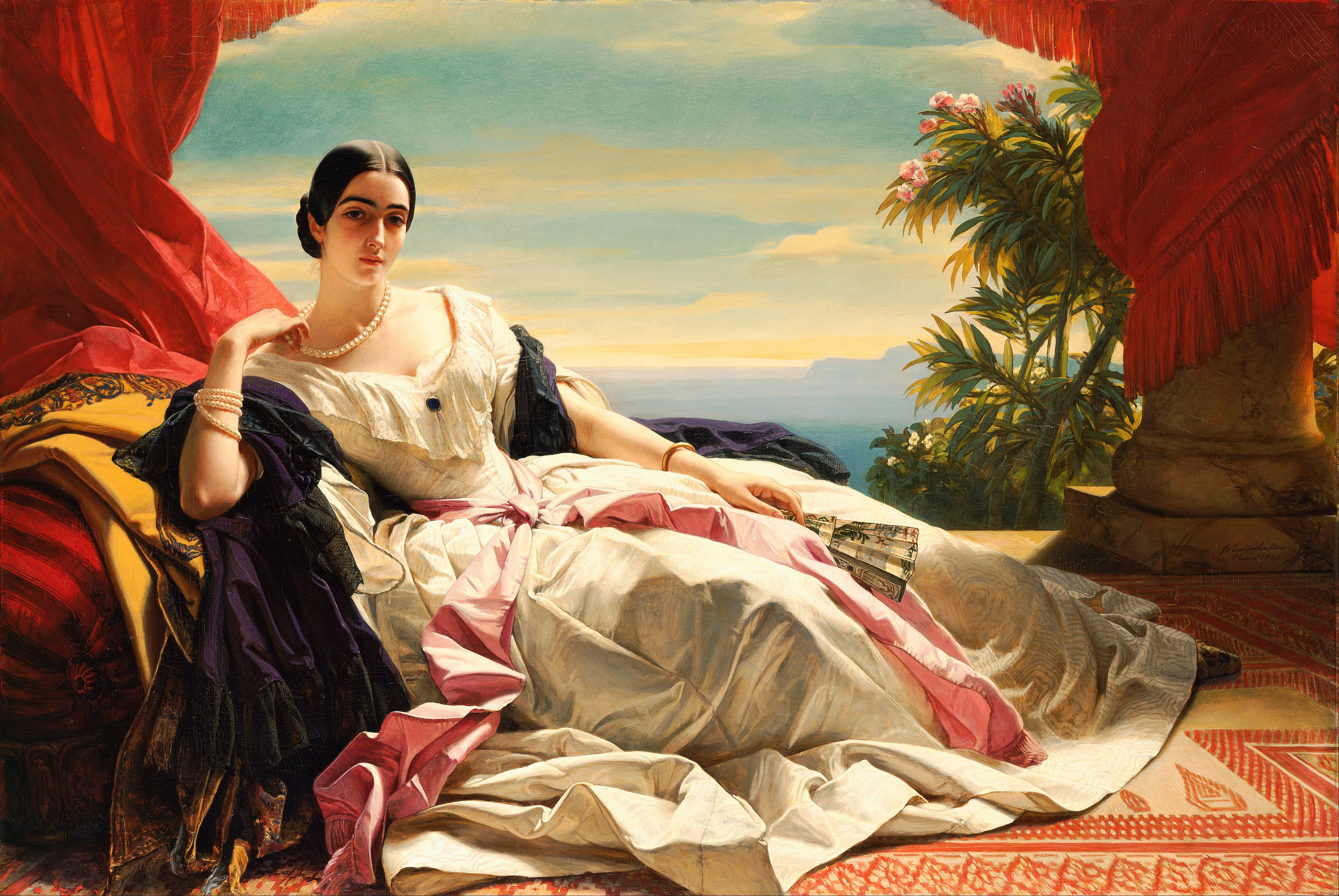
Leonilla Bariatinskaia Princess of Sayn Wittgenstein Sayn (1843), J. Paul Getty Museum, Los Angeles. Winterhalter contrasted sumptuous fabrics and vivid colors against creamy flesh to heighten the sensuality of the pose, the model, and the luxuriant setting.

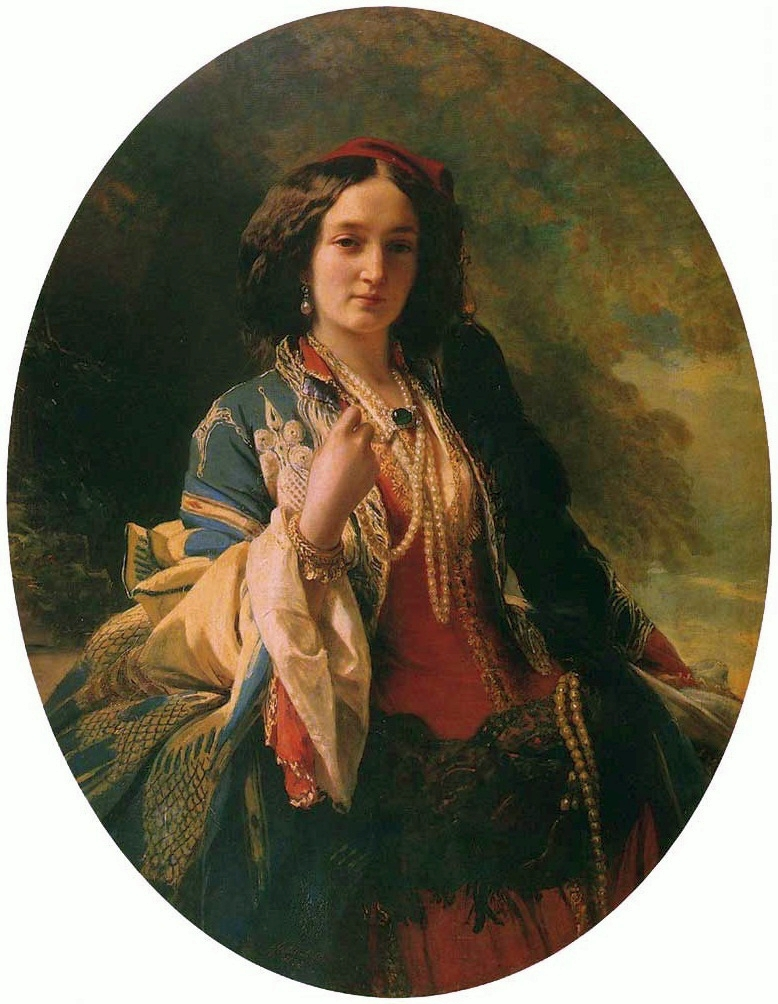
Portrait of Countess Potocka (1854), National Museum, Warsaw. Countess Potocka sat for this portrait in Paris, where she went after returning from a trip to the Holy Land. Róża Krasińska, who with her mother went to Paris, wrote that she was "a few times in the Winterhalter's studio, while the mother posed for her portraits".

Winterhalter first visited England in 1842, and returned several times to paint Queen Victoria, Prince Albert and their growing family, painting at least 120 works for them, a large number of which remain in the Royal Collection, on display to the public at Buckingham Palace and other royal residences. On display at Osborne House is Florinda, given by Victoria as a birthday present for Albert in 1852.

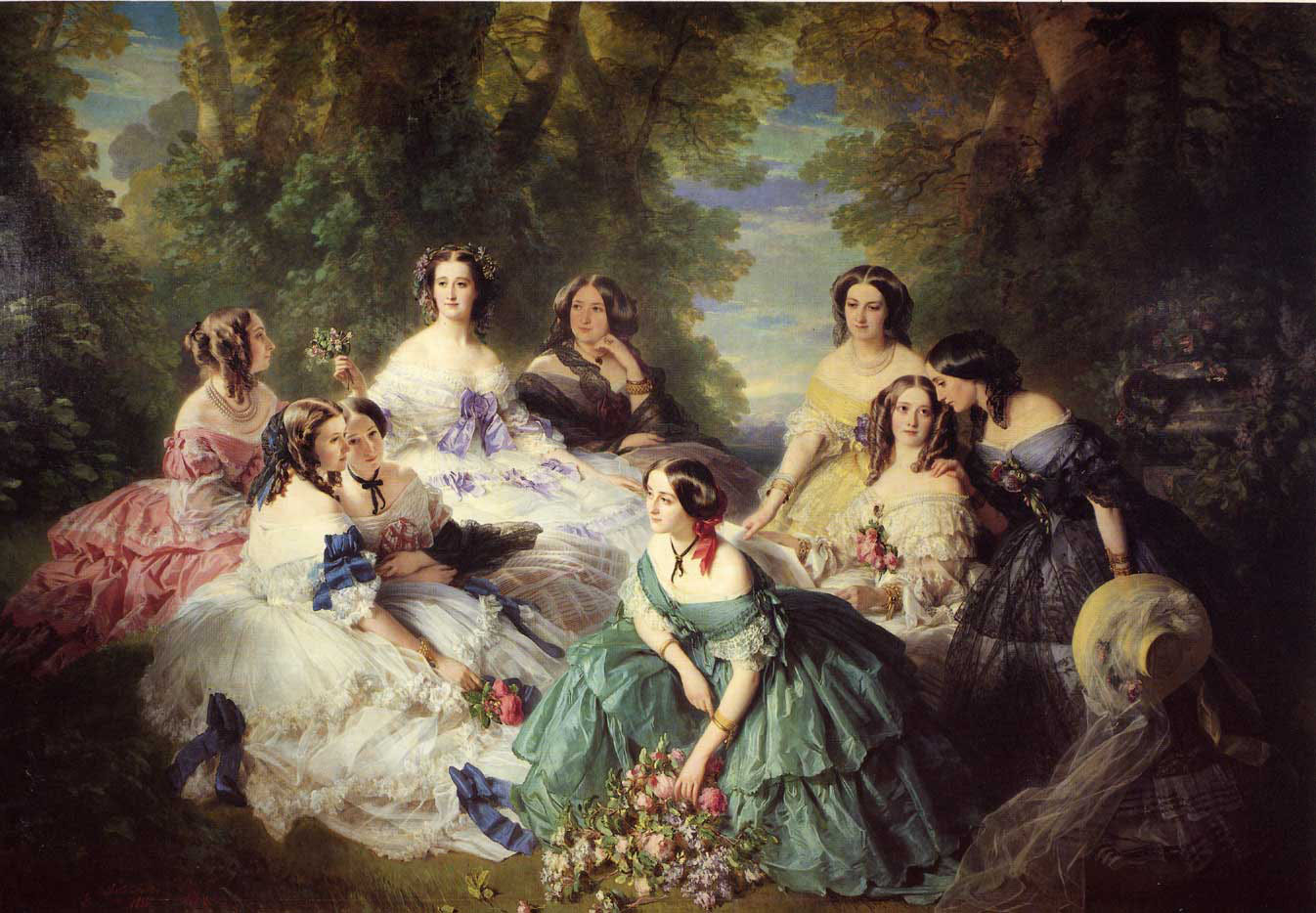
Empress Eugénie Surrounded by her Ladies in Waiting (1855), Château de Compiègne.

Persistence saw Winterhalter survive from the fall of one dynasty to the rise of another. Paris remained his home until a couple of years before his death. In the same year, his marriage proposal was rejected, and Winterhalter remained a bachelor committed to his work.

After the accession of Napoleon III, his popularity grew. From then on, under the Second Empire, Winterhalter became the chief portraitist of the imperial family and court of France. The French Empress Eugénie became a favorite sitter, and she treated him generously. In 1855 Winterhalter painted his masterpiece: Empress Eugénie Surrounded by her Ladies in Waiting. He set the French Empress in a pastoral setting gathering flowers in a harmonious circle with her ladies in waiting. The painting was acclaimed and exhibited in the Exposition Universelle (1855). It remains Winterhalter's most famous work. The composition shows a marked similarity to Florinda and this gave rise to scandalous gossip that the Empress and her ladies had posed déshabillé for the earlier painting.

In 1852, he went to Spain to paint Queen Isabella II with her daughter. Russian aristocratic visitors to Paris also liked to have their portraits executed by the famous master. As the "Painter of Princes", Winterhalter was thereafter in constant demand by the courts of Britain (from 1841), Spain, Belgium, Russia, Mexico, the German states, and France. During the 1850s and 1860s, Winterhalter painted a number of important portraits of Polish and Russian aristocrats. In 1857, he painted the portrait of Tsarina Maria Alexandrovna. During this time he also painted portraits of members of the André family, including the art collector Édouard André, Henriette André Walther, and Ernest André, which now hang in the Musée Jacquemart-André in Paris.

During the Second Mexican Empire in the 1860s, headed by Maximilian I of Mexico, Winterhalter was commissioned to paint portraits of the Imperial couple. The Empress of Mexico, Charlotte of Belgium was the daughter of Louise-Marie of France, Queen of the Belgians, whom Winterhalter painted at the beginning of his career in France. Some of Winterhalter's paintings of the Mexican monarchs still remain in their Mexico City palace, Chapultepec Castle, now the National Museum of History.

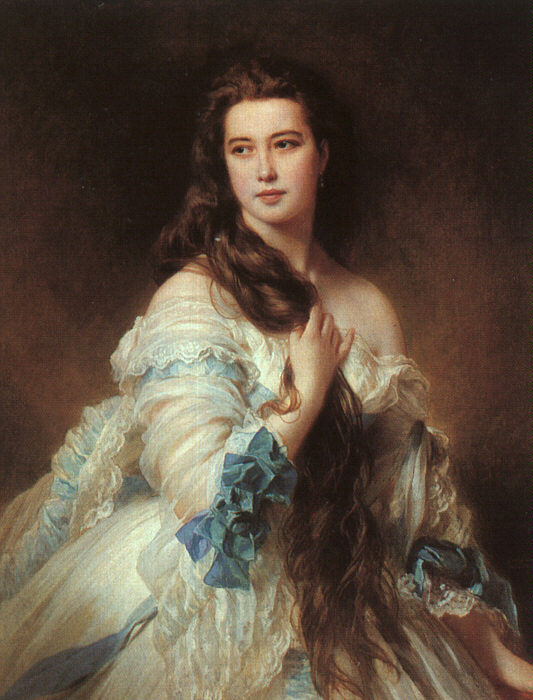
Barbe Dmitrievna Mergassov Madame Rimsky-Korsakov (1864), oil on canvas, 117 × 90 cm, Musée d'Orsay, Paris

During a visit to Frankfurt am Main in the summer of 1873, he contracted typhus and died on 8 July. He was 68 years old.

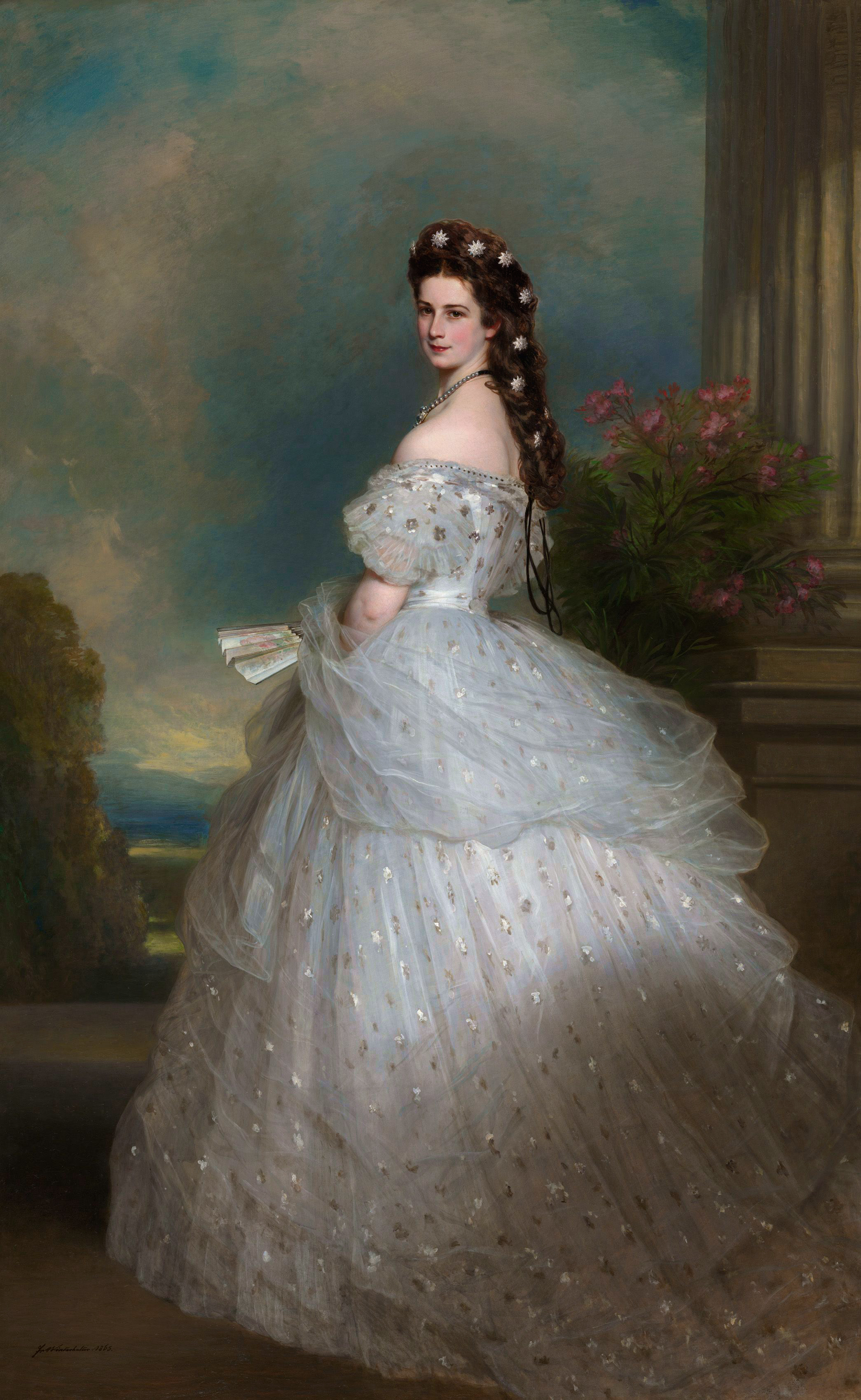
Portrait of Empress Elisabeth of Austria (1865), oil on canvas, 255 × 133 cm, Kunsthistorisches Museum, Vienna.

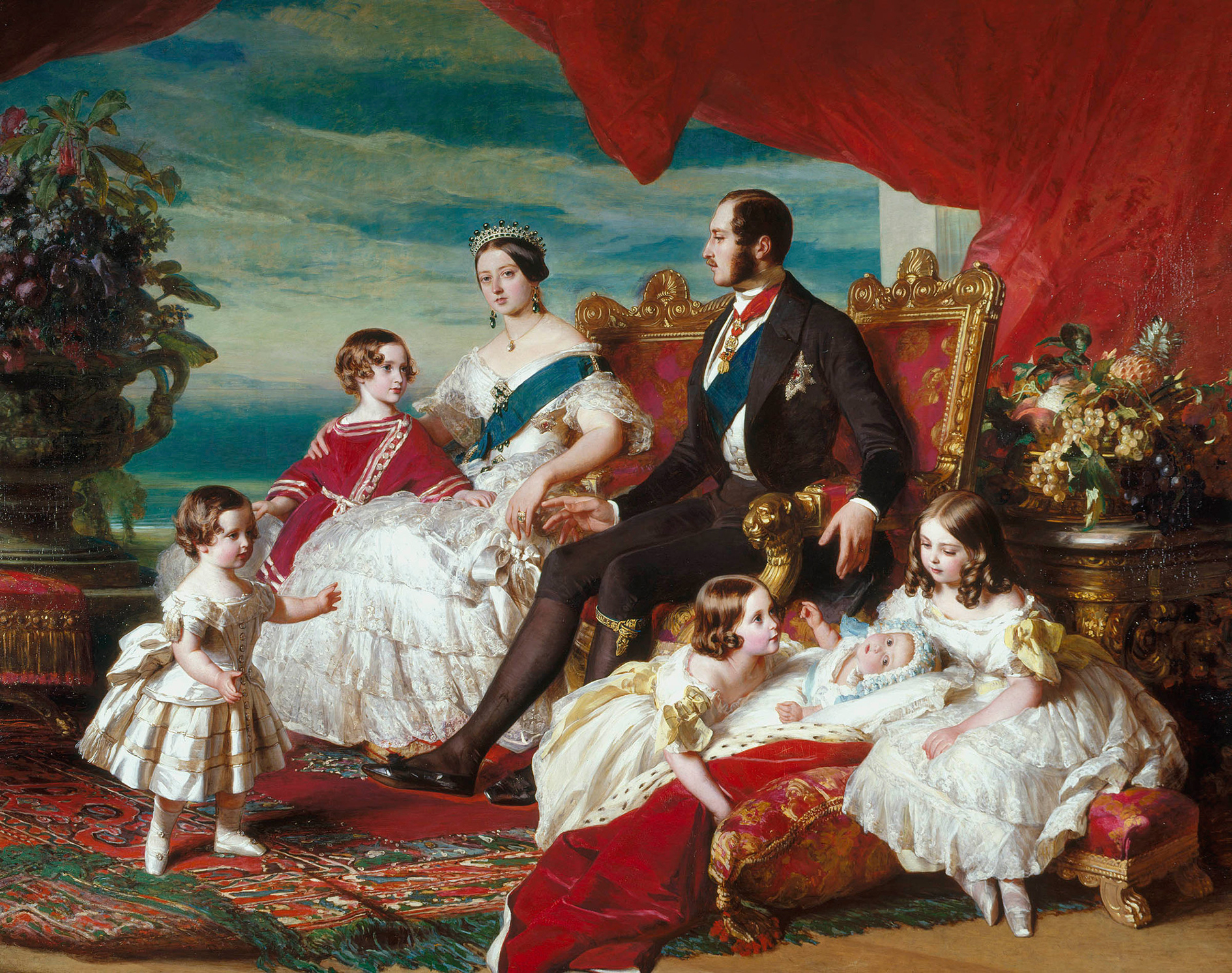
The Royal Family depicting Queen Victoria and Prince Albert's family in 1846 by Franz Xaver Winterhalter. left to right: Prince Alfred (unbreeched at two years); the Prince of Wales; Queen Victoria; Prince Albert; and Princesses Alice, Helena and Victoria

== Gallery ==
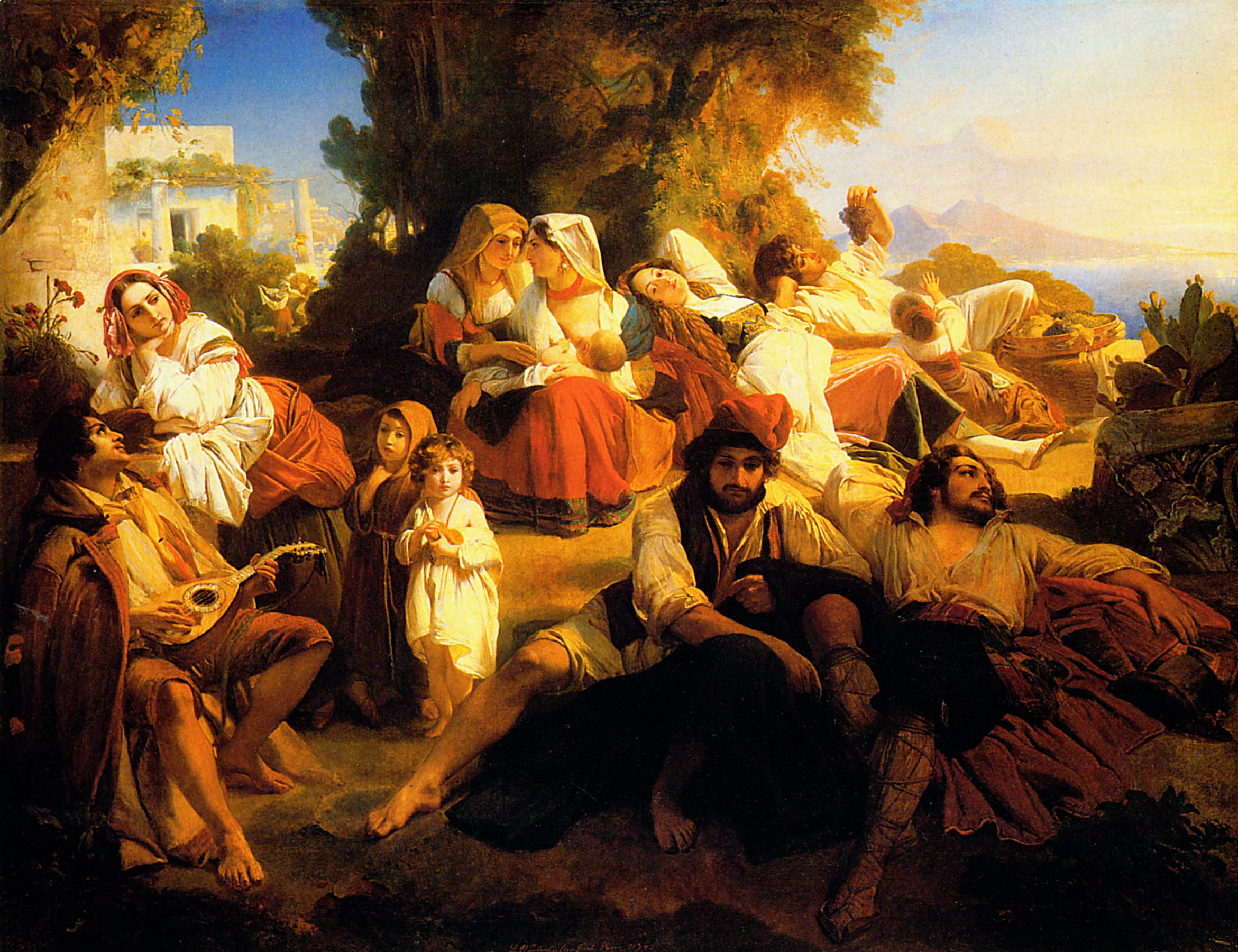
Il dolce Farniente, 1836

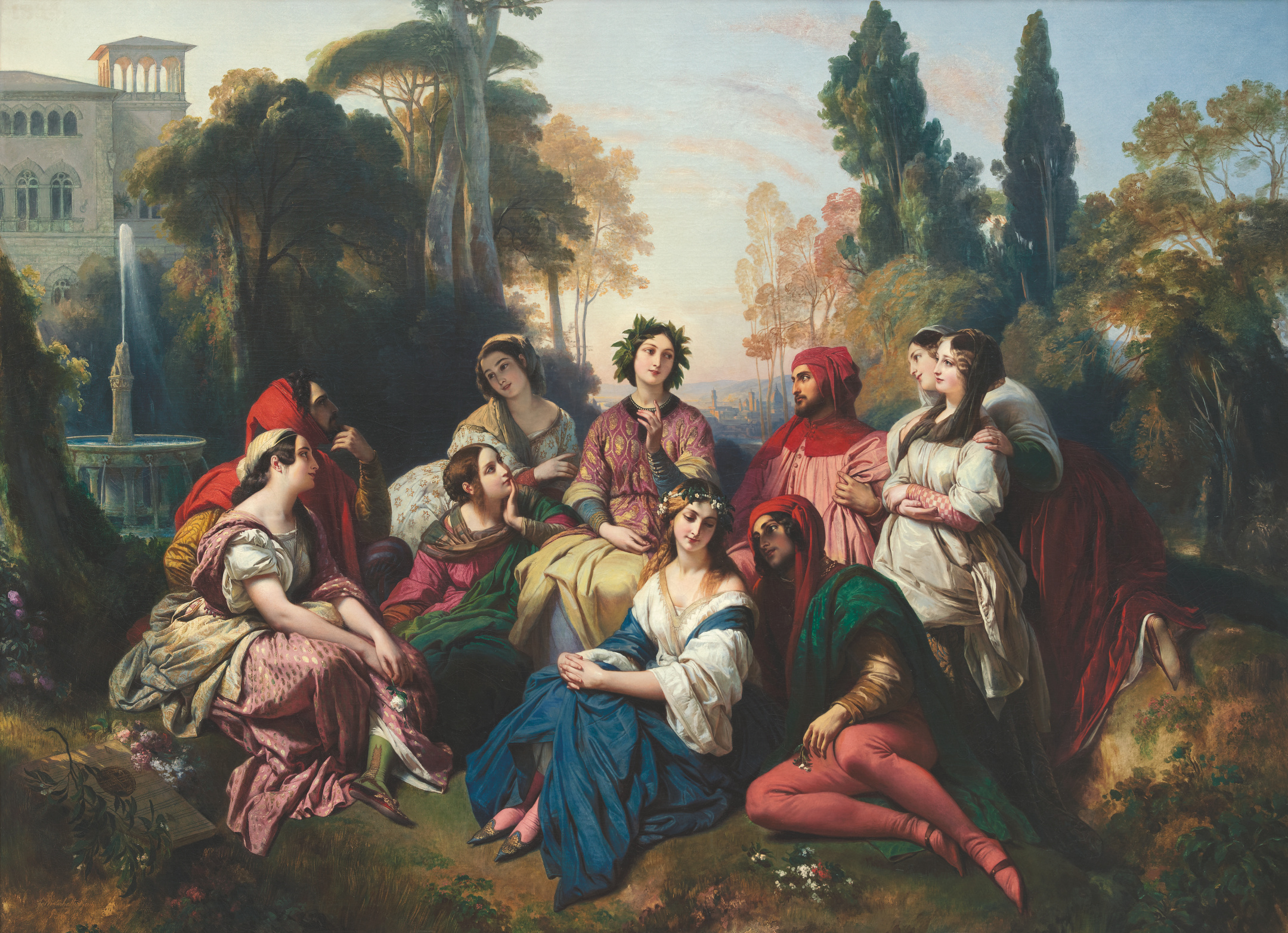
Il Decameron, 1837

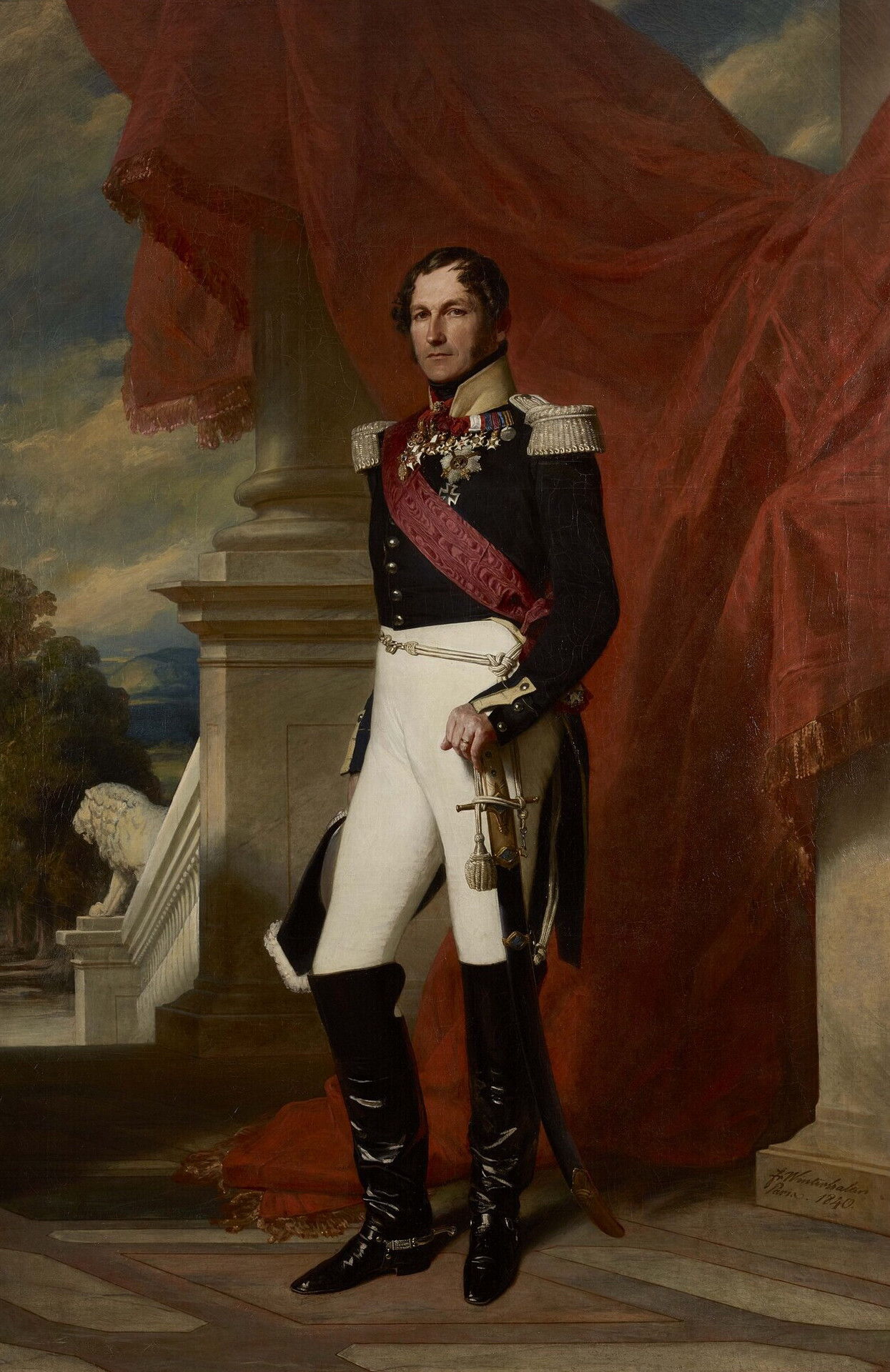
Portrait of Leopold I of Belgium, 1840

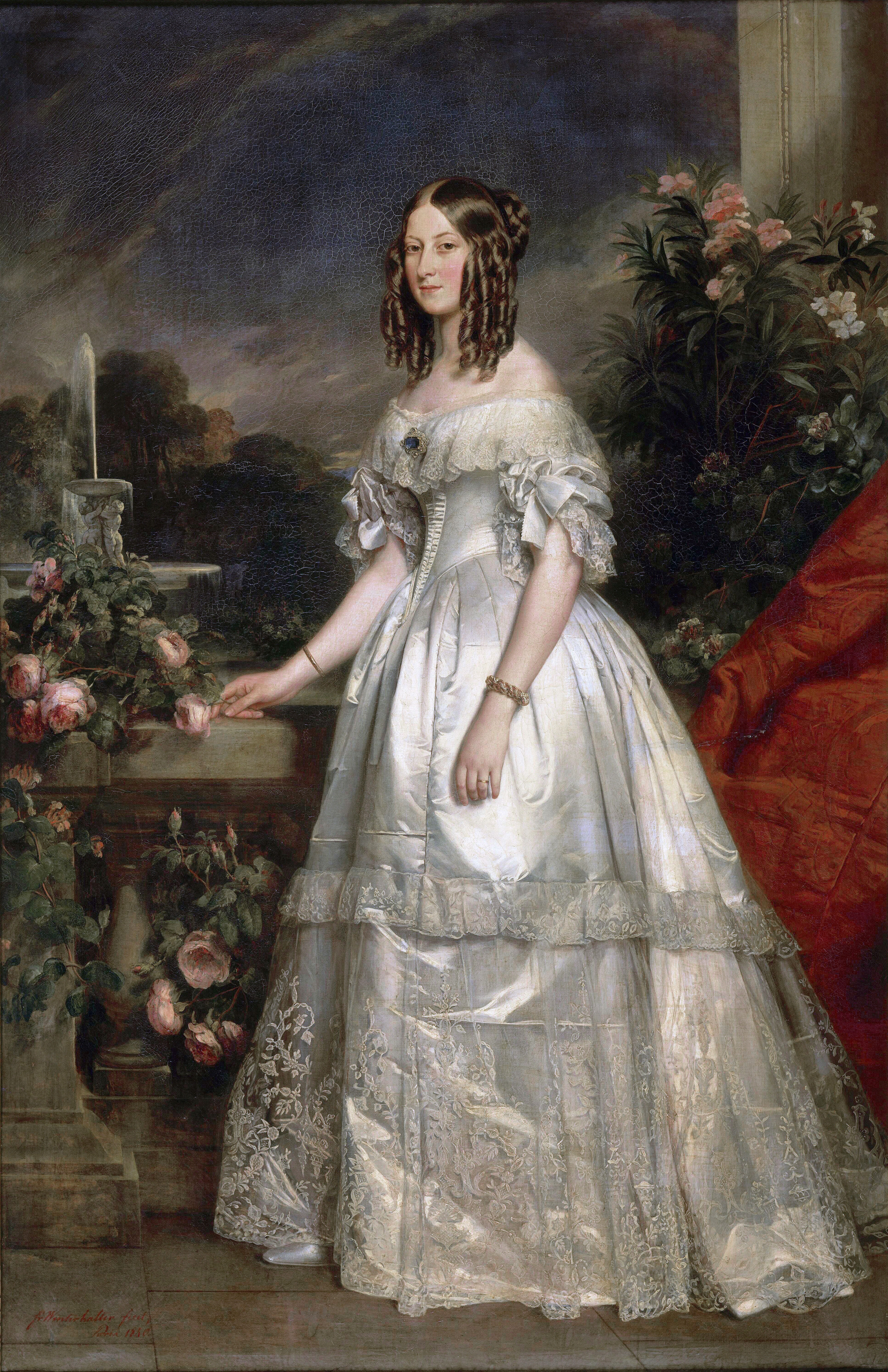
Portrait of the Duchess of Nemours, 1840

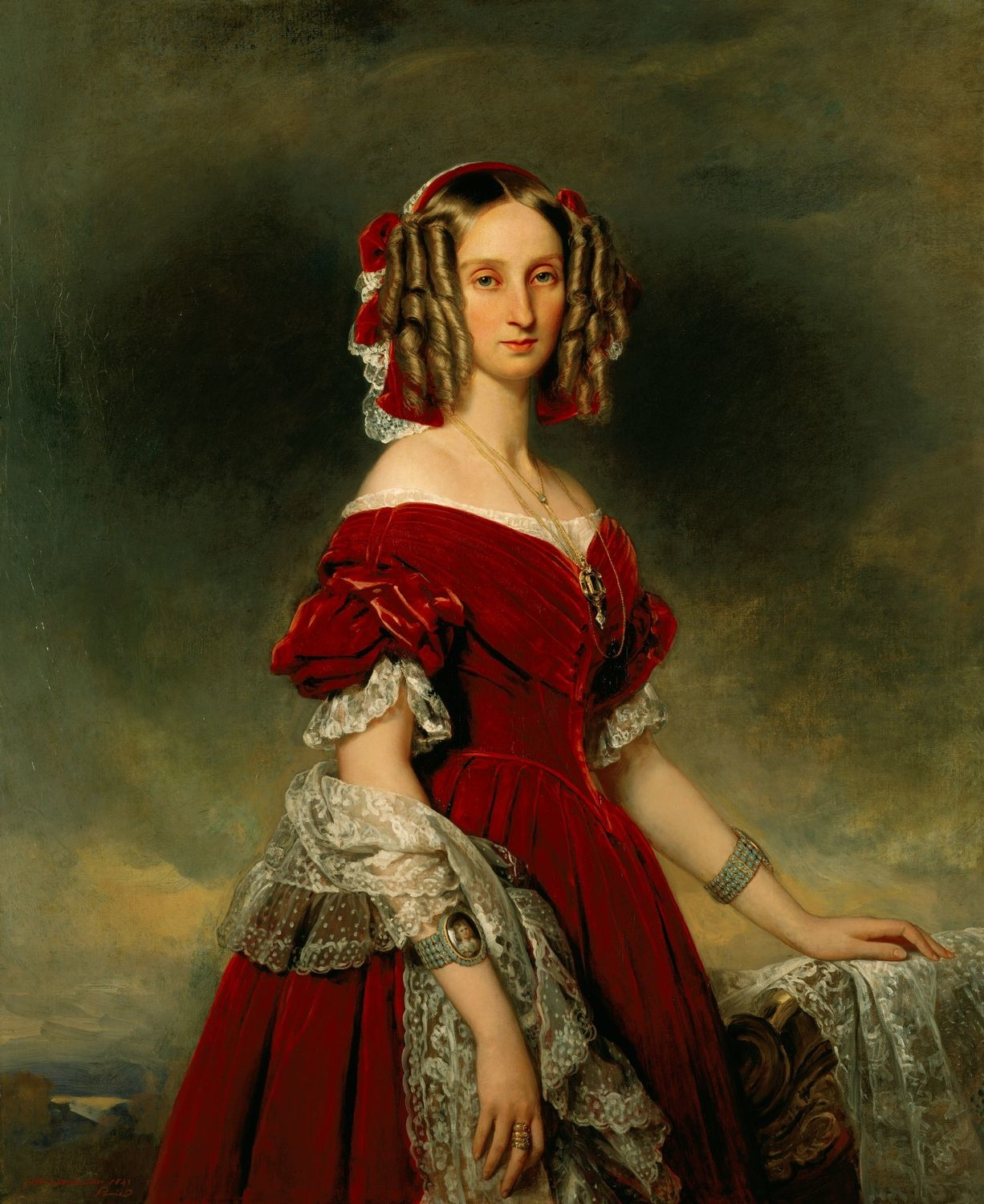
Portrait of Louise of Orléans, 1841

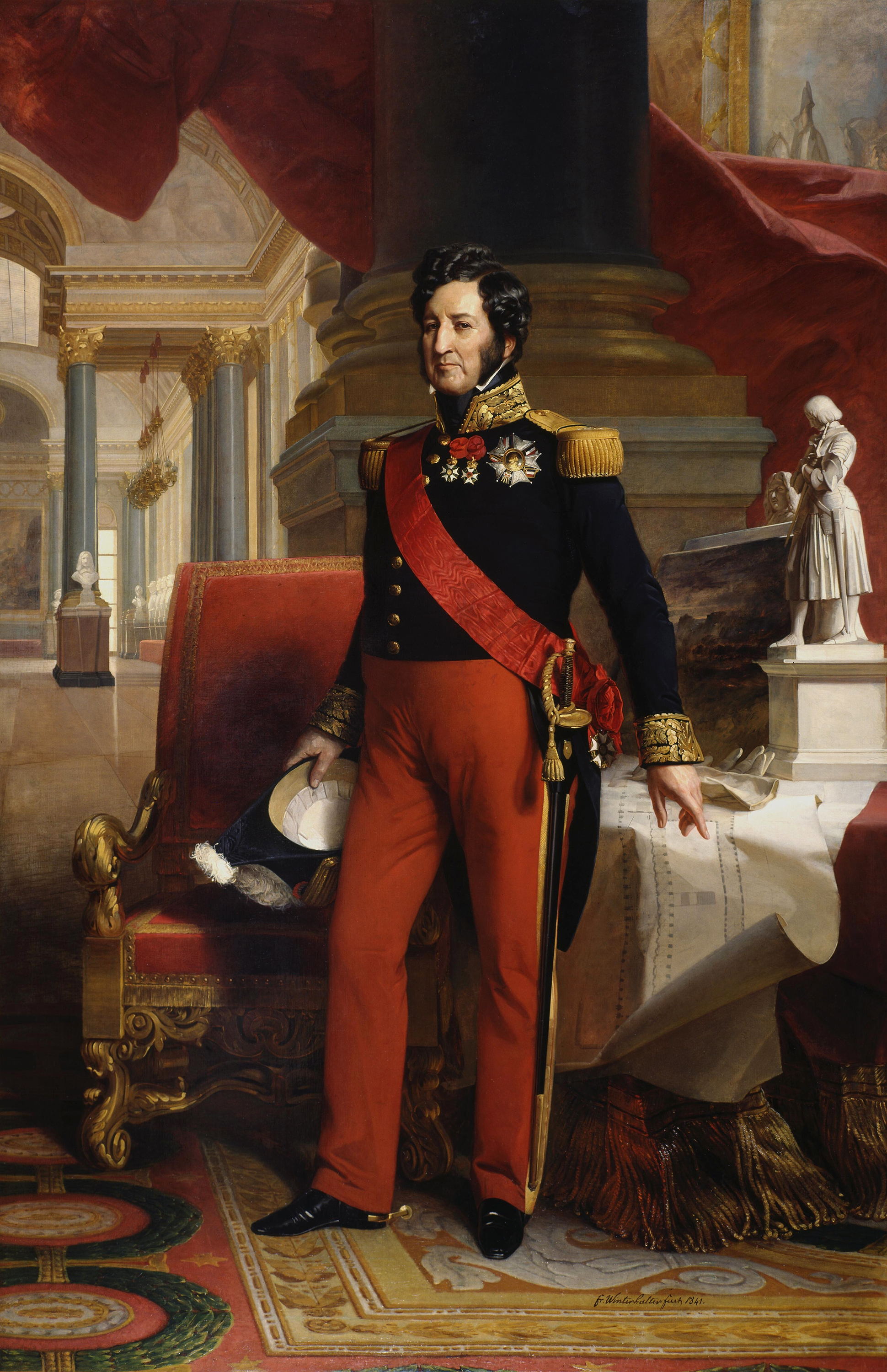
Portrait of Louis Philippe I, 1841

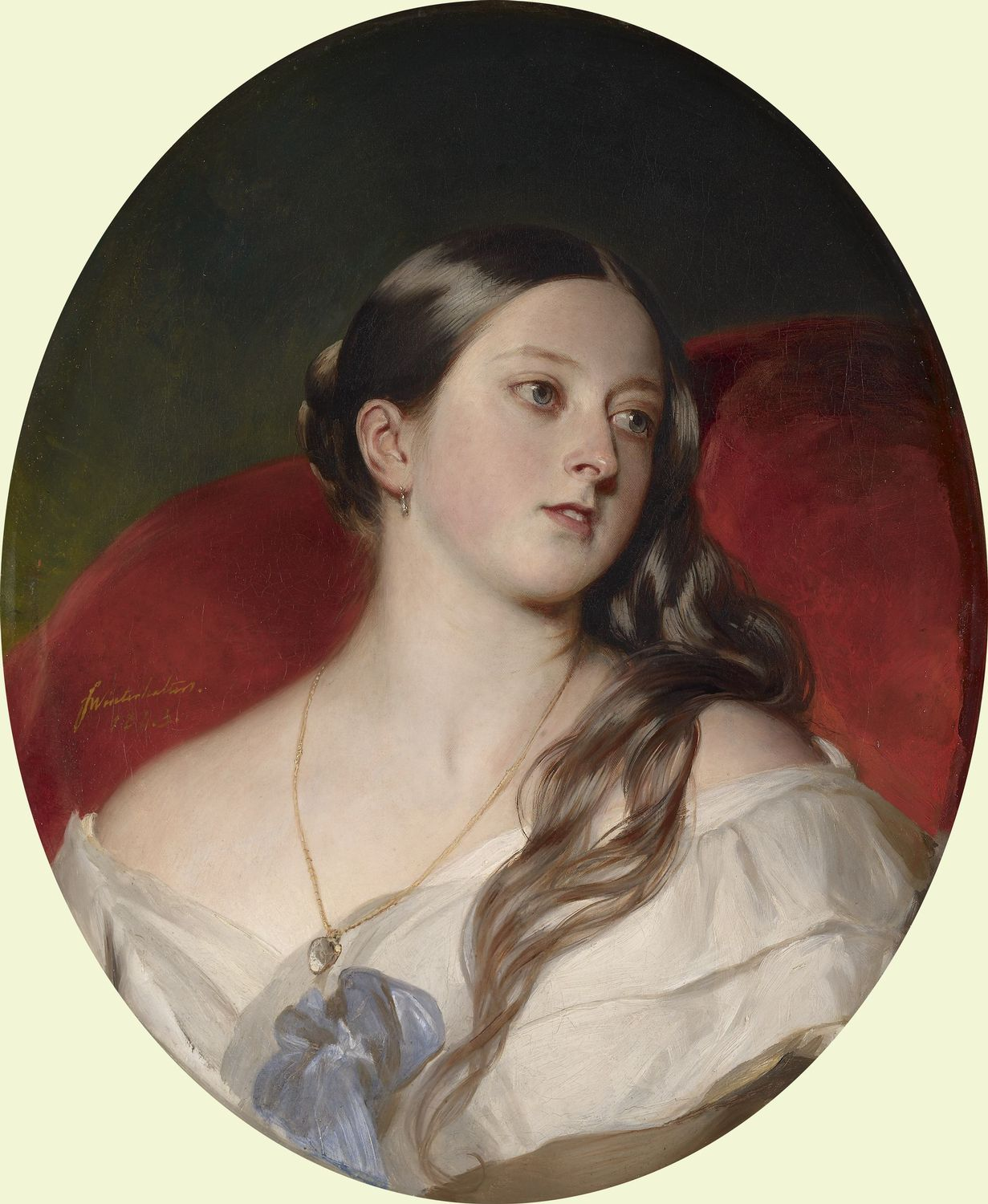
Queen Victoria, 1843

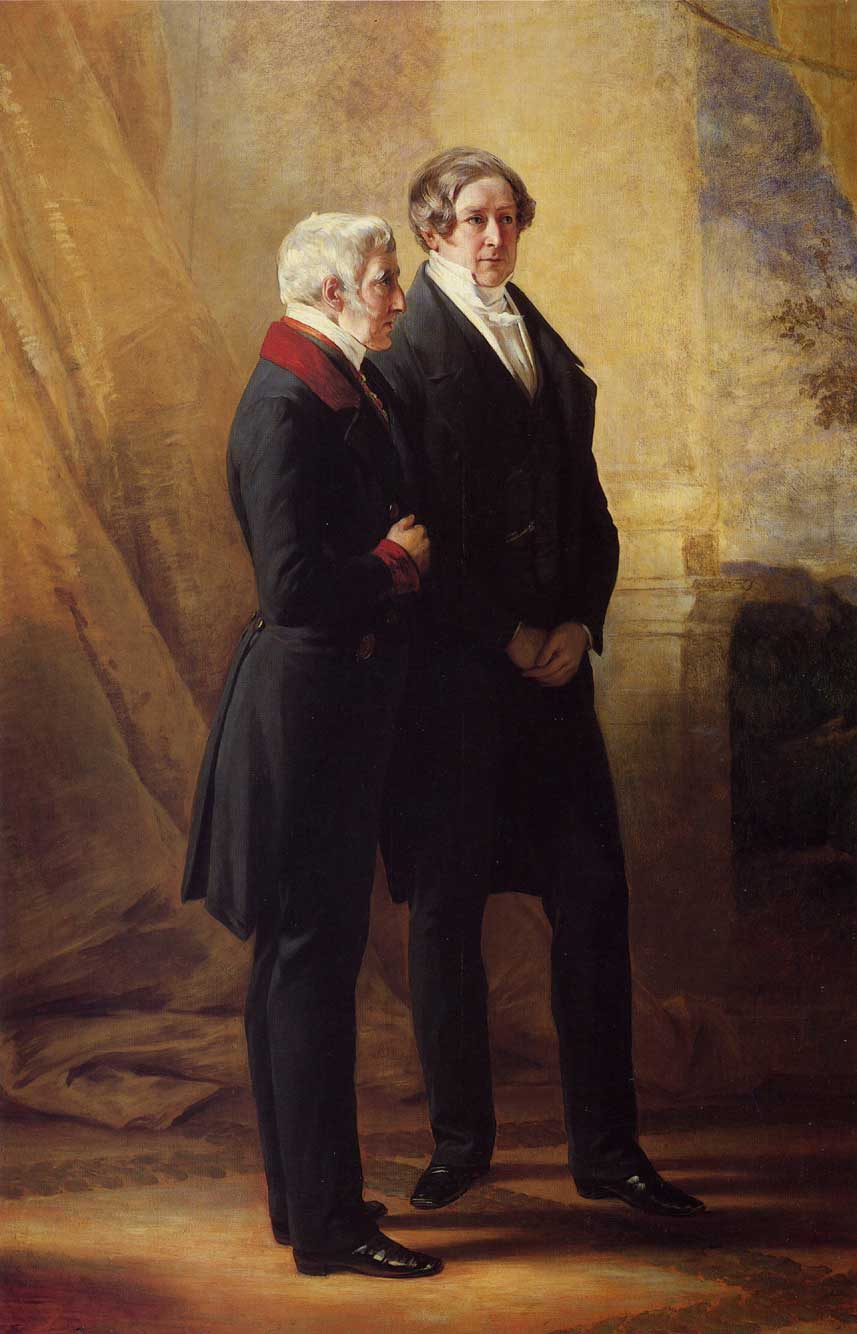
The Duke of Wellington and Sir Robert Peel, 1844

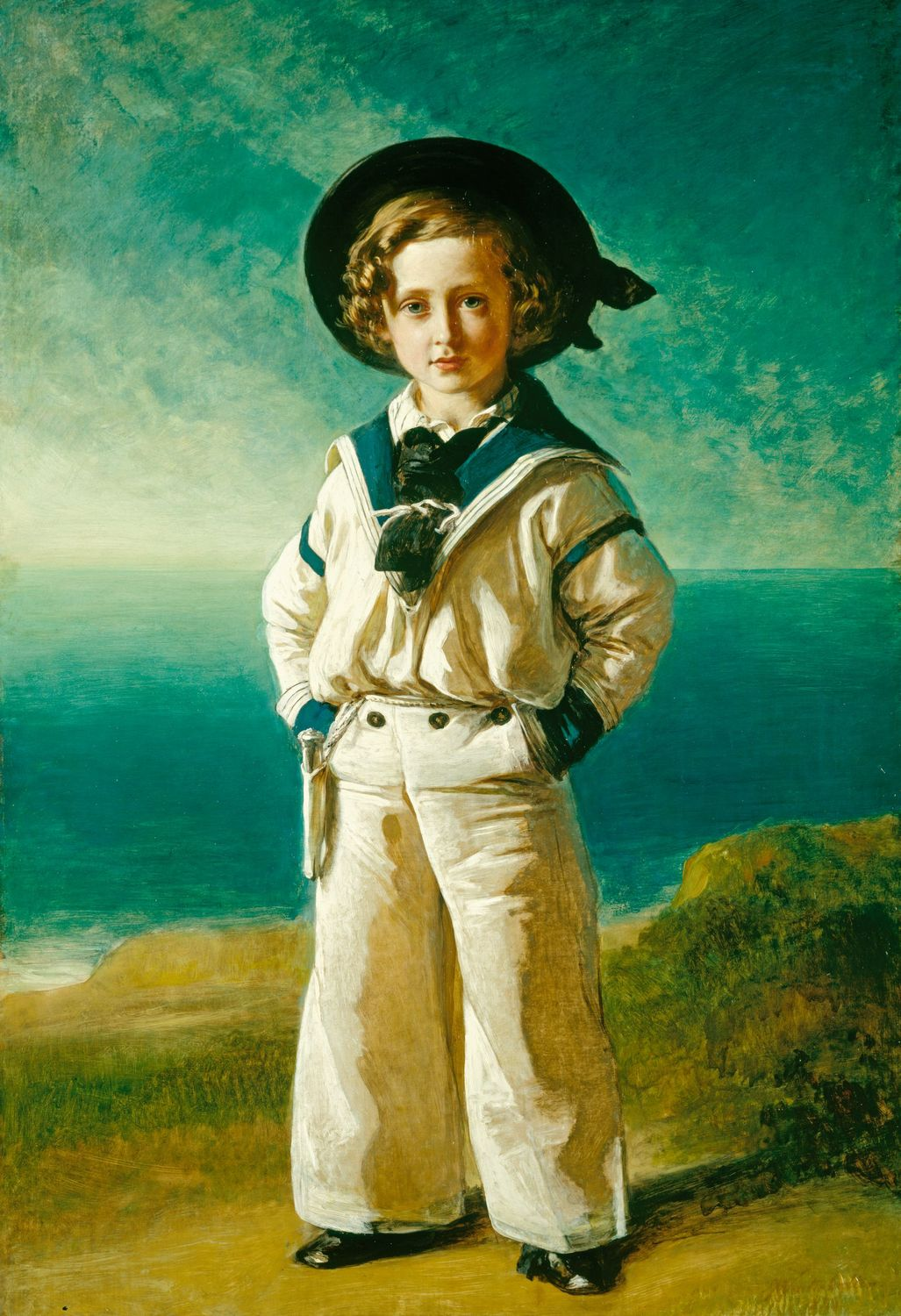
Portrait of Albert Edward, Prince of Wales, 1846

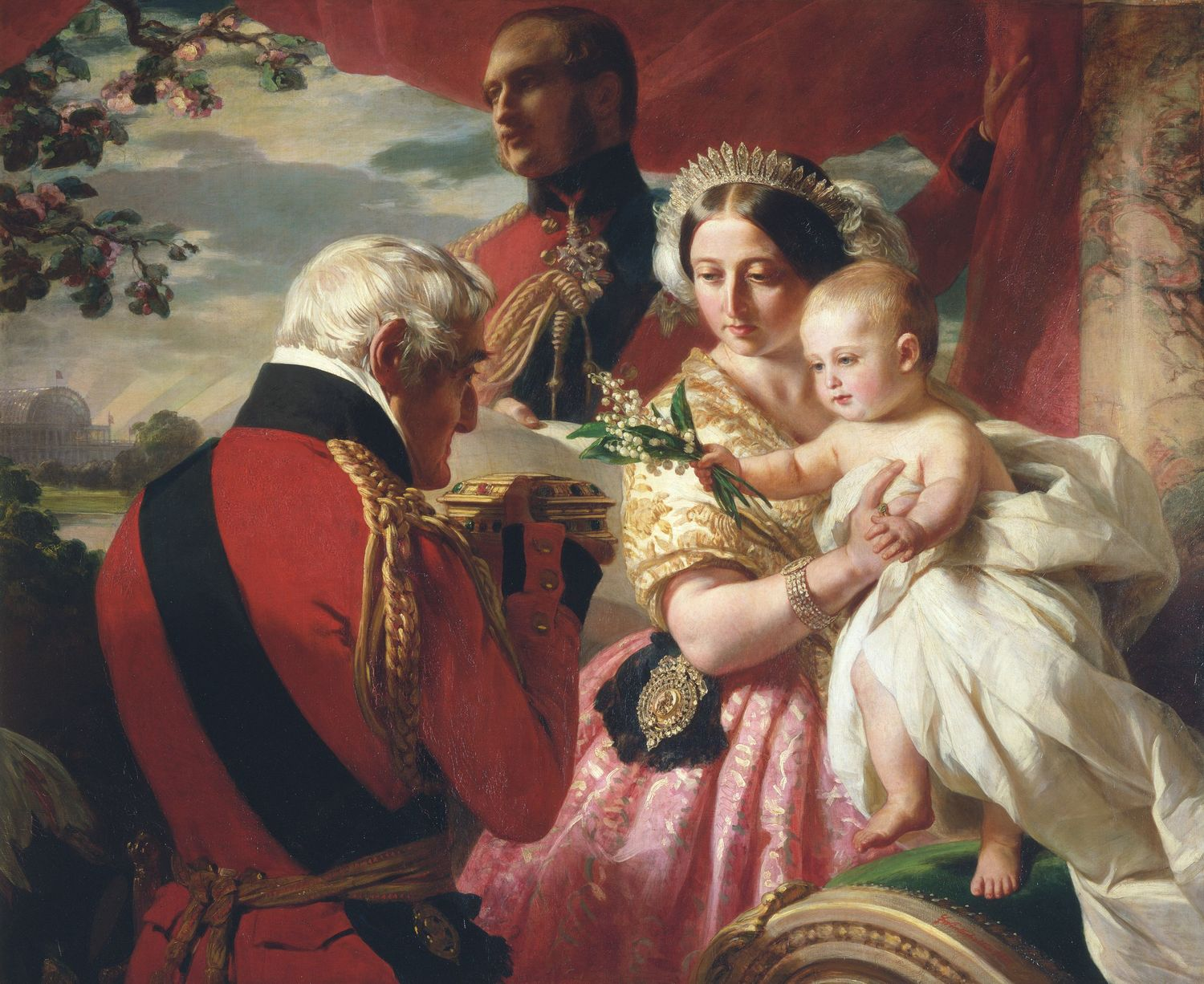
The First of May 1851, 1851

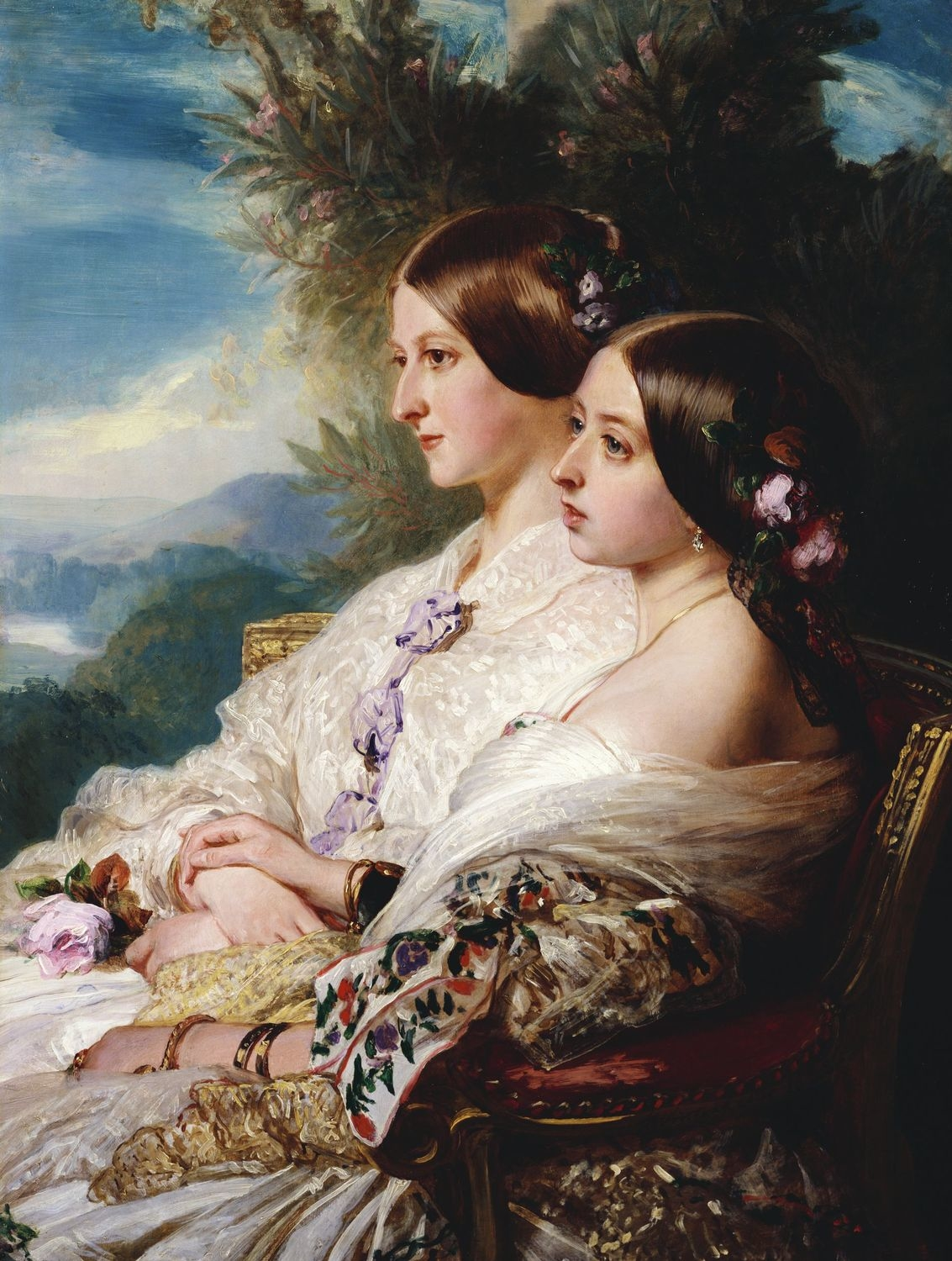
The Cousins, 1852

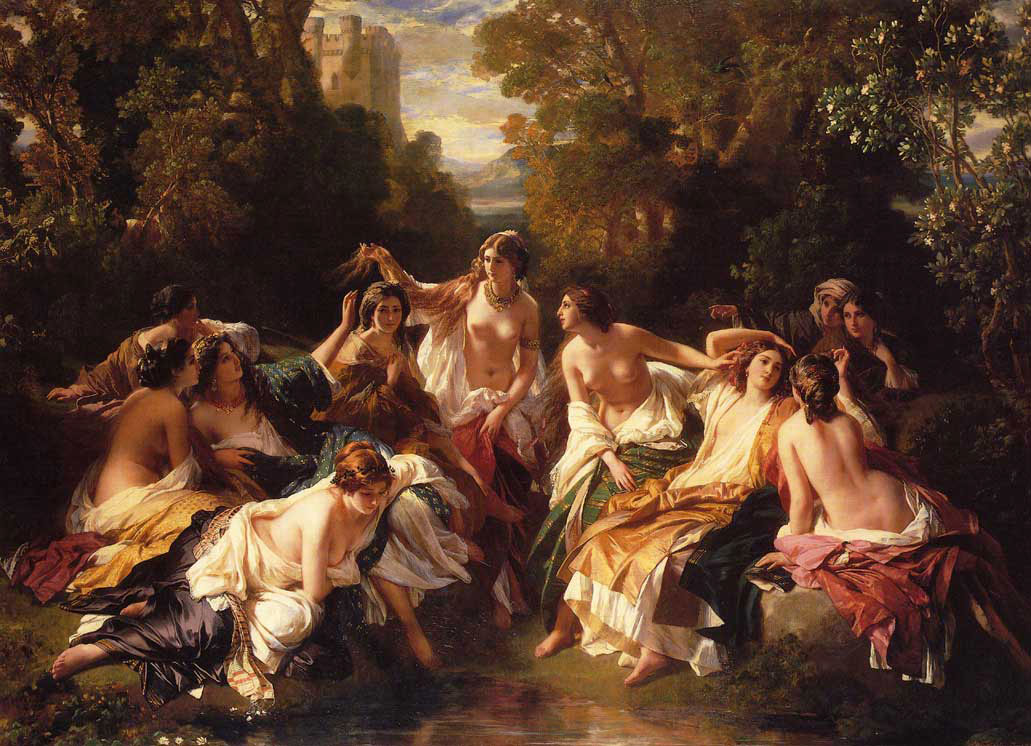
Florinda, 1853

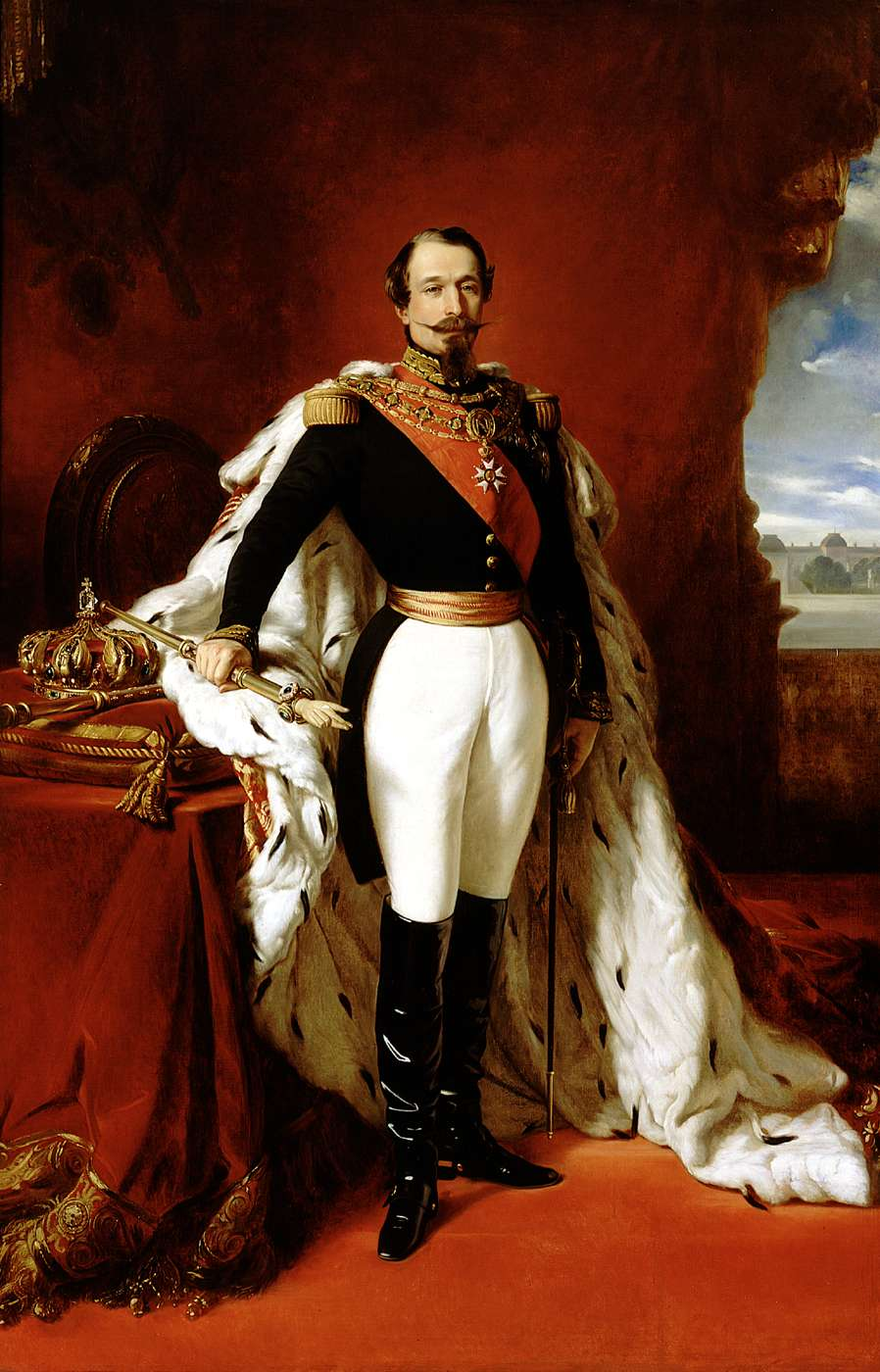
Portrait of Napoleon III, 1853

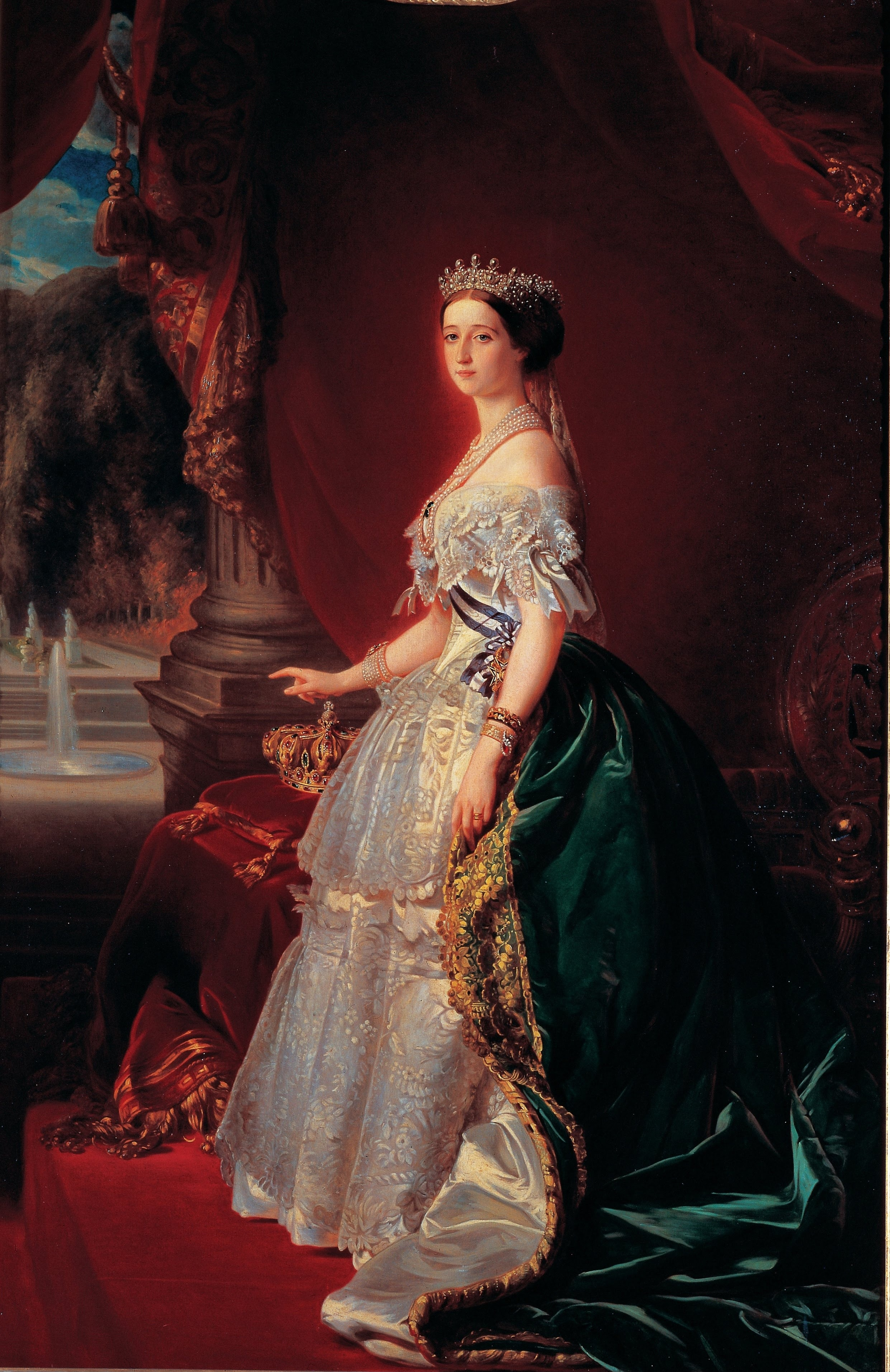
Portrait of Empress Eugénie, 1853

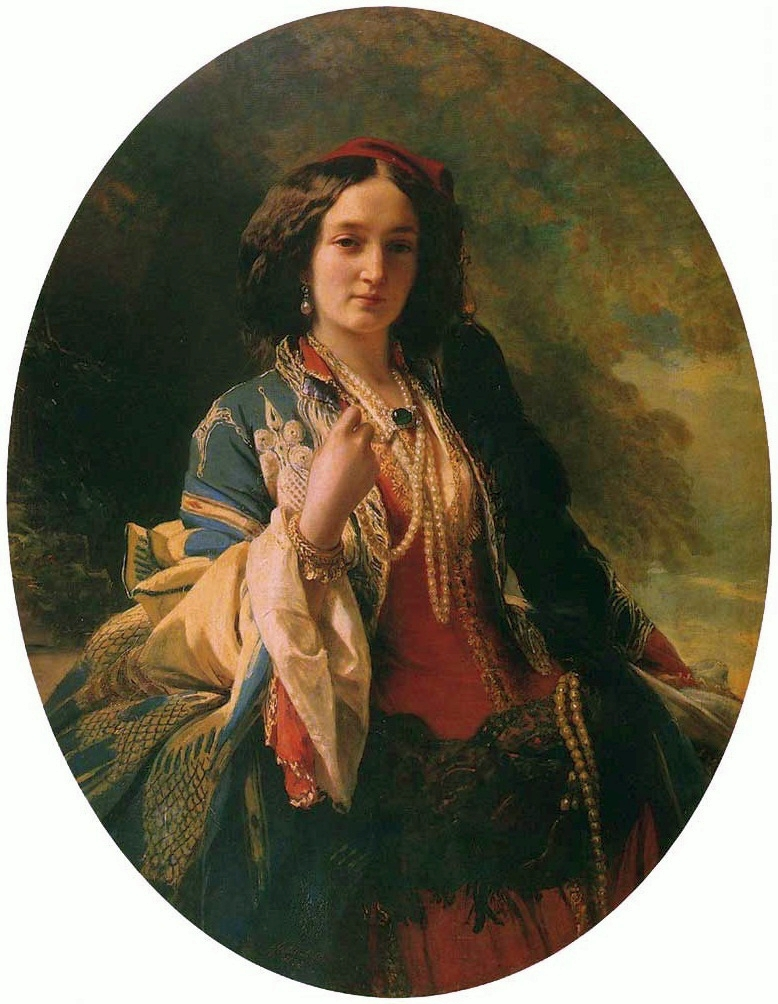
Portrait of Countess Potocka, 1854

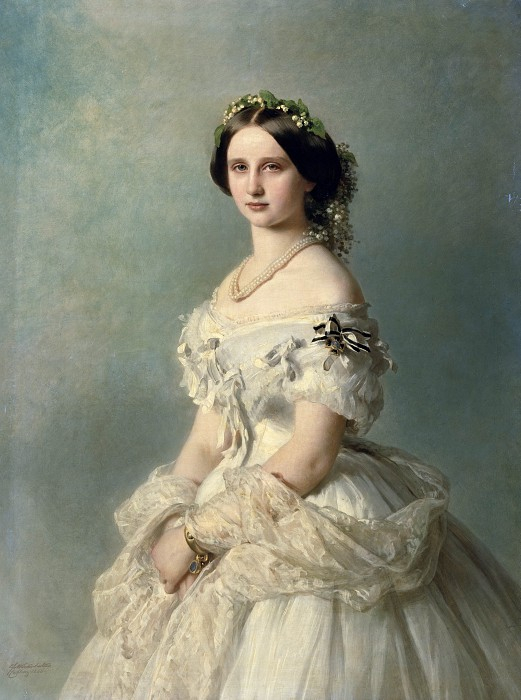
Princess Louise of Prussia, 1856

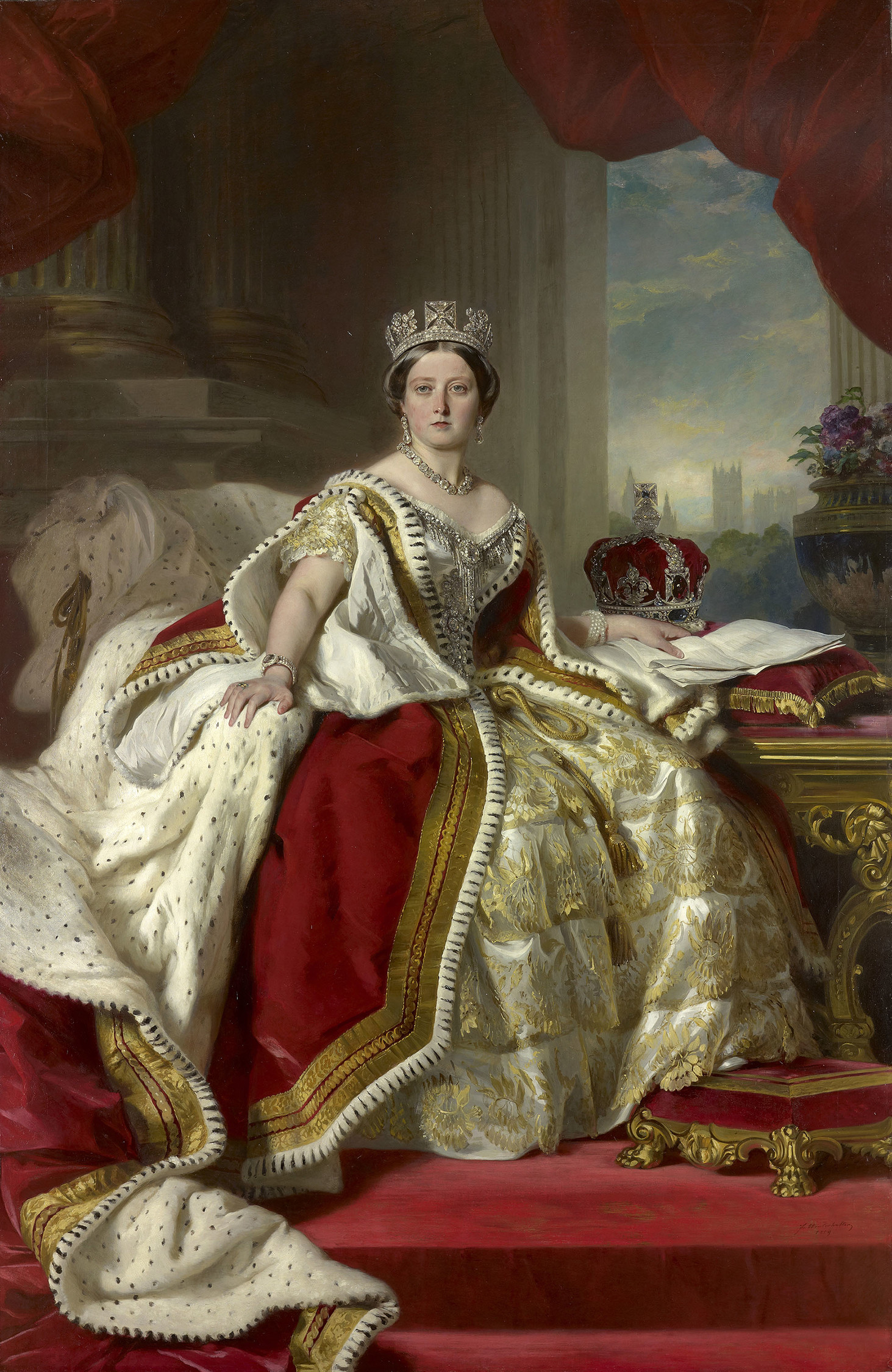
Portrait of Queen Victoria, 1859

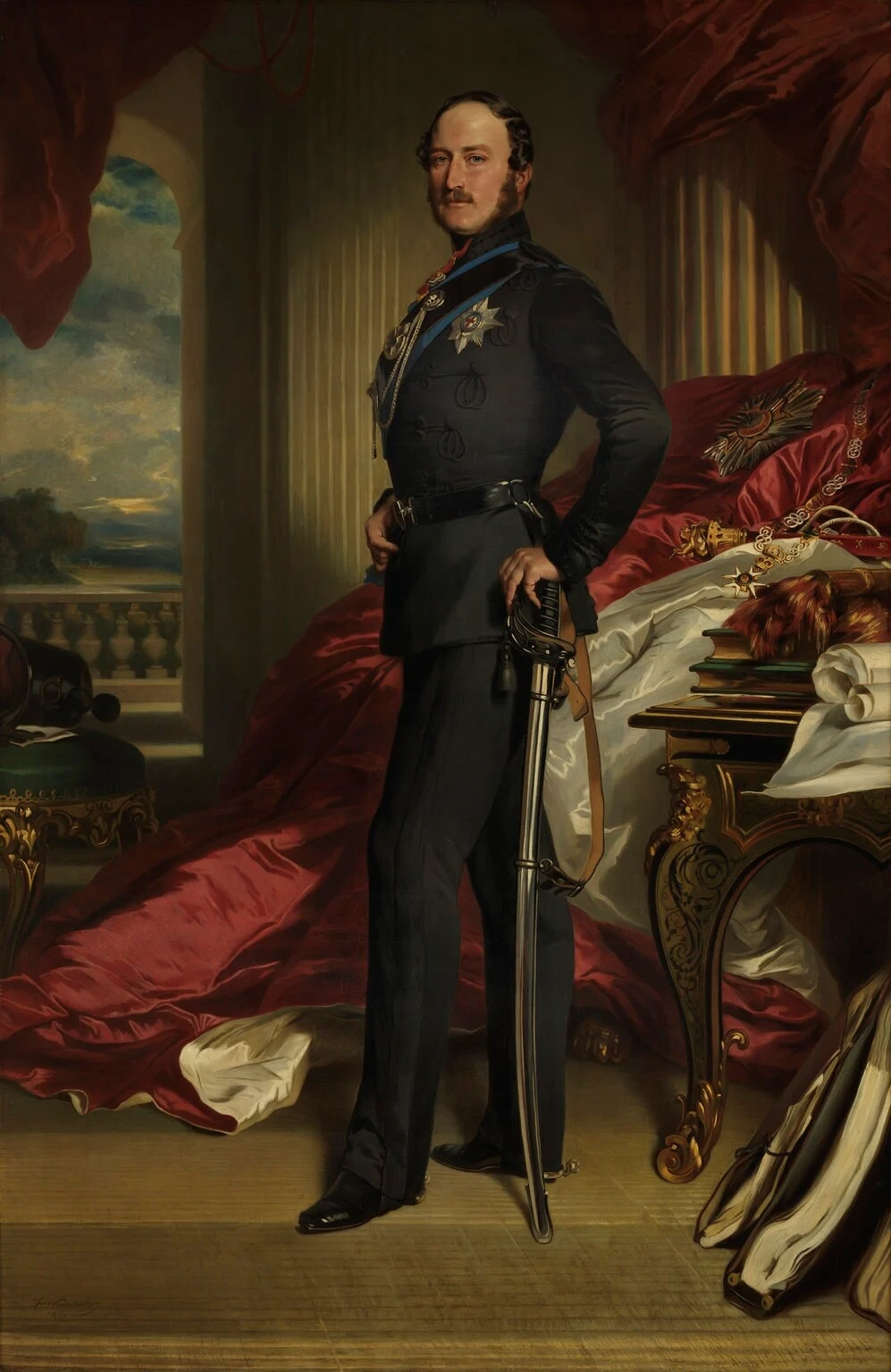
Portrait of Prince Albert, 1859

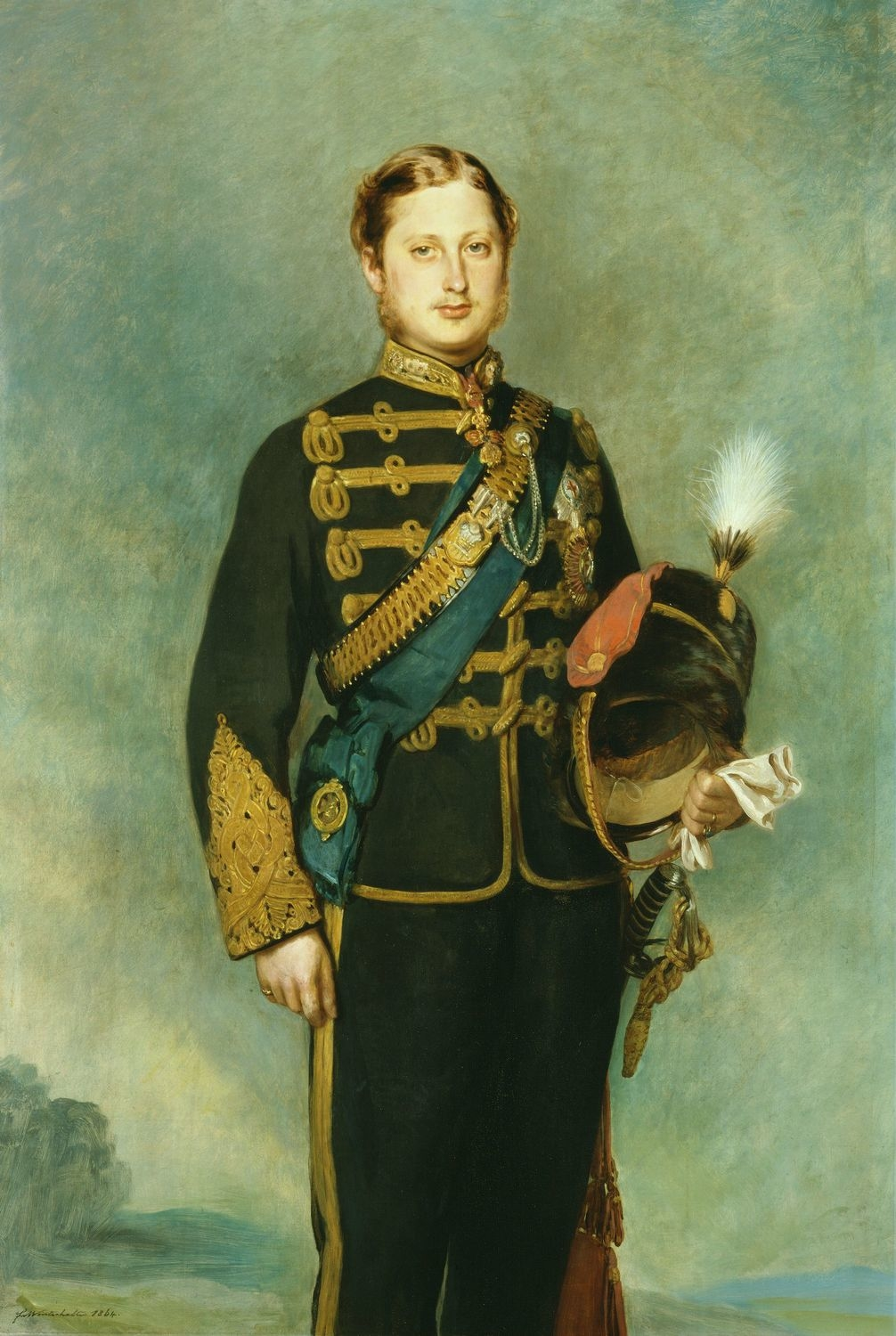
Portrait of Albert Edward, Prince of Wales, 1864

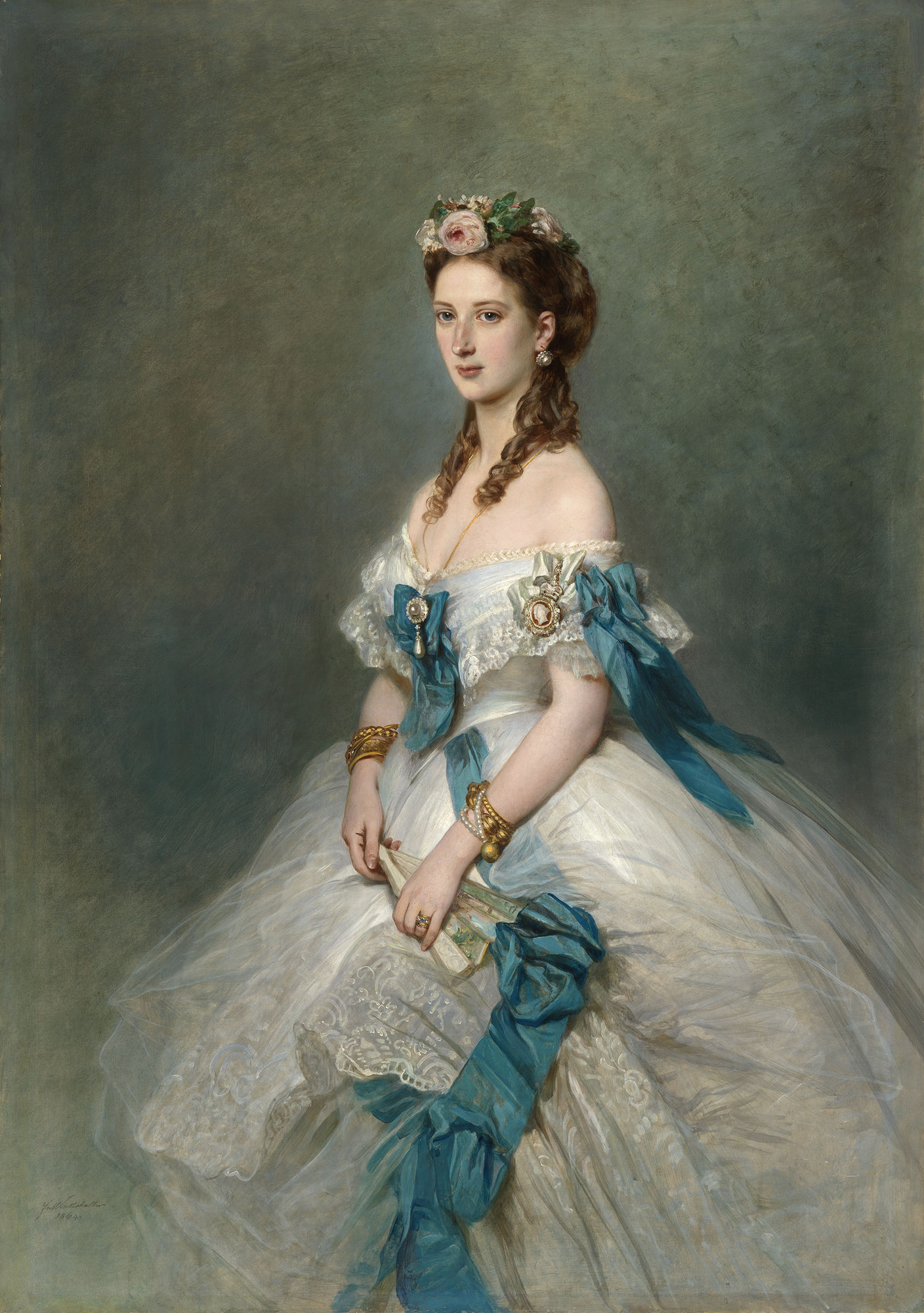
Portrait of Alexandra of Denmark, 1864

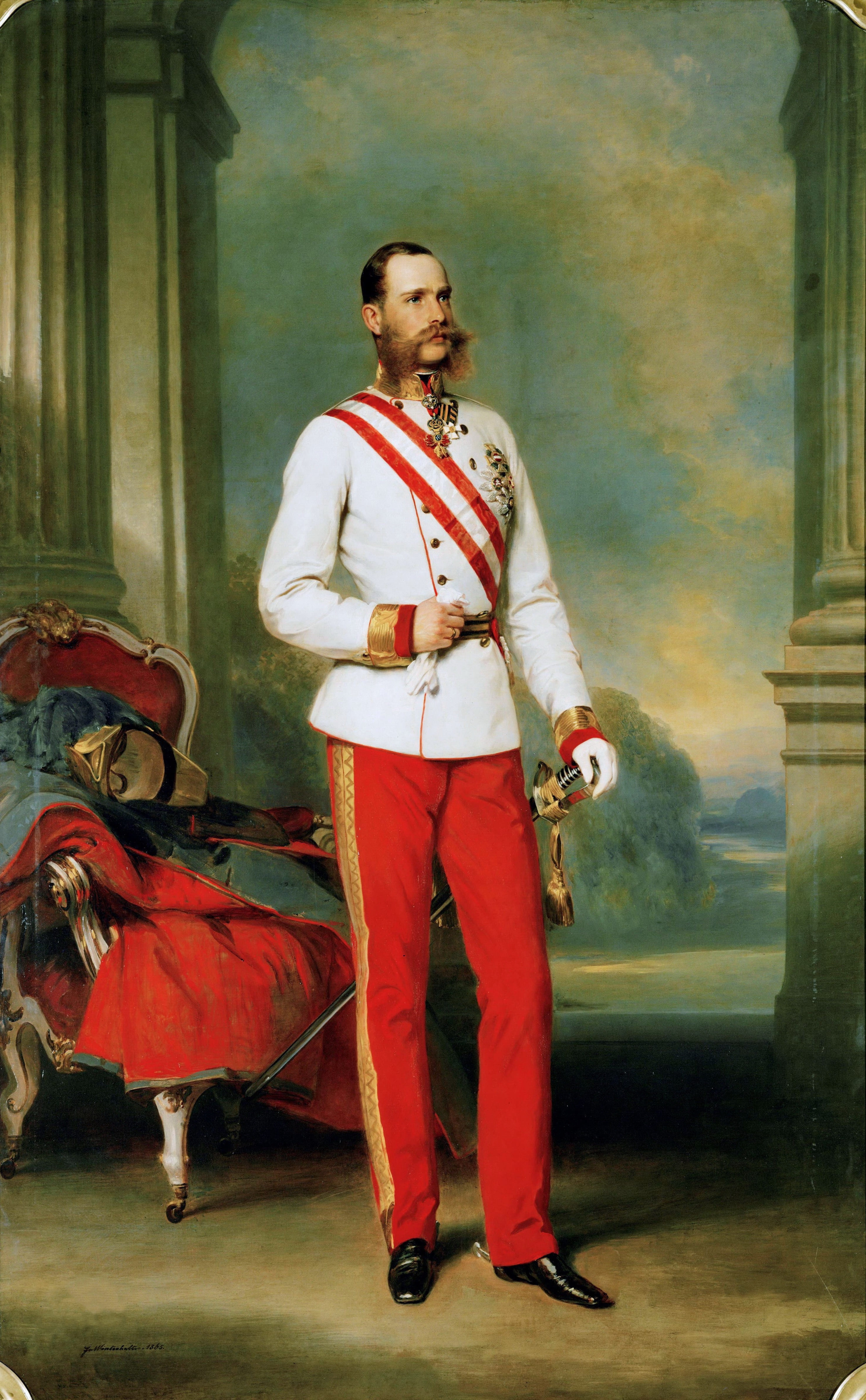
Portrait of Franz Joseph I, 1865
