= Schoolgirl Apocalypse =

- Theatrical poster
- Directed by: John Cairns
- Written by: John Cairns
- Produced by: Yuki Kito; Executive producers: Daniel Isaacsen; Yojiro Suzuki
- Starring: Higarino; Mai Tsujimoto
- Production company: Lantis KK
- Release date: July 2011 (BiFan Film Festival)
- Running time: 86 minutes
- Country: Japan
- Language: Japanese with English subtitles

Schoolgirl Apocalypse (セーラー服黙示録, Sērā-fuku mokushiroku; "Sailor suit Apocalypse") is a 2011 Japanese zombie film written and directed by John Cairns, as his first feature film. The film screened at Bucheon International Fantastic Film Festival and the Foreign Correspondents' Club of Japan in 2011 and the Fantasia Film Festival in Montreal in 2012.

== Plot ==
When all the men in her small town turn into zombies and begin to attack the women, Japanese schoolgirl Sakura (Higarino) finds her life turned upside down. The trauma of witnessing the mass murder of her female friends and family members pushes her toward madness.

Having few skills and armed only with her English textbook and a kyūdō bow, she sets out to survive. Having visions of a red-headed boy named Billy (Max MacKenzie), a character from one of her books, drives her toward insanity and she begins to lose her grip on reality. She wanders about, narrowly escaping her own death, until she finds Aoi (Mai Tsujimoto), a woman who is both equipped and mentally ready to kill. But this woman is dangerous and, rather than support, offers violence and more punishment. Seeking the real-life version of Billy, Sakura must decide whether to survive and find the answers or give up and die. (Note: Some text adapted from the Schoolgirl Apocalypse website, released under the terms of the Creative Commons Attribution-Sharealike 3.0 Unported License and the GNU Free Documentation License)

== Cast ==
- Higarino as Sakura Ishizuka
- Mai Tsujimoto as Aoi
- Max MacKenzie as Billy
- Kaoru Nishida
- Asami Miyakawa

== Production ==
Director John Cairns lived in Japan for over a decade before the release of the film. Schoolgirl Apocalypse was developed during the 2010 NAFF IT Project.

== Screenings ==
Its world premiere was July 15, 2011, at the Bucheon International Fantastic Film Festival (BiFan) in July 2011, and it screened there again in July 2012. It also screened at the Foreign Correspondents' Club of Japan in August 2011. It had its German premiere on May 24, 2012, at the 13th Japan Filmfest Hamburg, and in its North American premiere, the film screened at the 2012 Fantasia Film Festival in Montreal, Quebec, Canada.

== Reception ==
L'Écran Fantastique described Schoolgirl Apocalypse as an "alternative" zombie film. "A skillful and effective road movie at the intersection of 28 Days Later and The Road...a great surprise sure to delight alternative zombie movie fans."

The film was also described as genre-changing by the German online film review magazine Manifest. They stated that it is daring for an American film director to use exaggerated western clichés for a Japanese horror-genre film. They called the film "a liberating 'fuck you', a surprisingly serious and decelerated undead Armageddon." Sound design was favorably compared to Poltergeist II, but they faulted the director for his restrained gore. They also stated that while the project was filmed in rural areas near Mount Fuji, the famous landmark did not appear in the film, which was an intentional choice by the director to avoid clichés. They concluded by stating that while the film had too little action and no blood, it was a good movie, and rated it 4 out of 5 stars.

News-Gate wrote that an important criterion for a successful horror film would include "savage monsters and beautiful heroine," and that the film's plot of heroine and boy versus an epidemic was taken from a comic book by Tomohiro Koizumi.

Djuna noted that this was director John Cairns' first feature film, and developed in 2010 through support of the Network of Asian Fantastic Films (NAFF). They wrote that the film's beginning and title might lead viewers to feel the film was to be simply a "Japanese schoolgirls killing zombies" film, but it took off in an unexpected direction. They also noted that the film was a bit garbled, the political metaphors were too strong, and it did not contain as much action as might have been expected. Overall, the response was positive, and they rated the film 2 stars out of 3.
