= St. John Paul II Academy (Surrey, British Columbia) =

- Motto: Totus Tuus (All Yours); 18230 24th Ave.

Location
- 2358 182nd Street; Surrey, British Columbia, V3Z 9V9; Canada

Information
- School type: Independent
- Motto: "Totus Tuus" (All Yours)
- Religious affiliation: Roman Catholic
- Established: 2017
- School board: Catholic Independent Schools of the Vancouver Archdiocese (CISVA)
- Superintendent: Sandra Marshall
- Principal: Anthony Walters
- Grades: 8–12
- Enrollment: 750 (co-ed)
- Language: English
- Area: Hazelmere, South Surrey
- Colours: Maroon and Navy
- Team name: Royals
- Website: www.sjp2academy.com

St. John Paul II Academy is the newest co-ed Catholic Secondary school, under the administration of Catholic Independent Schools Vancouver Archdiocese (CISVA) school board in Canada.

The new Catholic high school was commissioned under the leadership of Archbishop J. Michael Miller, CSB of the Vancouver Catholic Archdiocese. The new campus will open in Hazelmere, South Surrey, in 2025.

== Independent school status ==
St. John Paul II Academy is classified as a Group 1 school under British Columbia's Independent School Act. It receives 50% funding from the Ministry of Education. The school receives no funding for capital costs. It is under charge of the Roman Catholic Archdiocese of Vancouver.

== School uniforms ==
The Catholic school uniform is an important part of St. John Paul II Academy standards as it seeks to promote unity in faith. It also helps to remove discrimination. The uniform comprises the school colours of Maroon & White. This includes cardigans, pants for boys, Tartan Kilt for girls, along with all black shoes.

== Academic performance ==
St. John Paul II Academy has not been ranked by the Fraser Institute, as it's a relatively new school.

Academic Departments

- Humanities
- English
- French
- Mathematics
- Physical Education
- Science
- Robotics
- Special Needs Resources
- Visual Arts
- Career Development
- Christian education
- Textiles

== Athletic performance ==
Both the varsity boys' and girls' basketball teams will participate in the BC Catholic Basketball Championship, one of the largest tournaments in the province of BC. The new campus development in Hazelmere, South Surrey, may offer the ability to develop soccer and football programs in the future.

The school participates in sporting events under the name of the "Royals", with the team colours of maroon and white.

School teams
Cross country
Volleyball
Track and field
Basketball
Tennis
Ultimate

== Artistic performance ==
St. John Paul II Academy provides students with a variety of performing & non-performing arts.

| Performing Arts | Visual Arts |
|---|---|
| Drama | Art |
| Band | Photography |
| Music | Stage Props |
| Choir | Yearbook |

== Notes ==
As part of their faith in action, the academy provides support to Chugu Primary School in Nigeria.
