= School uniforms in Japan =

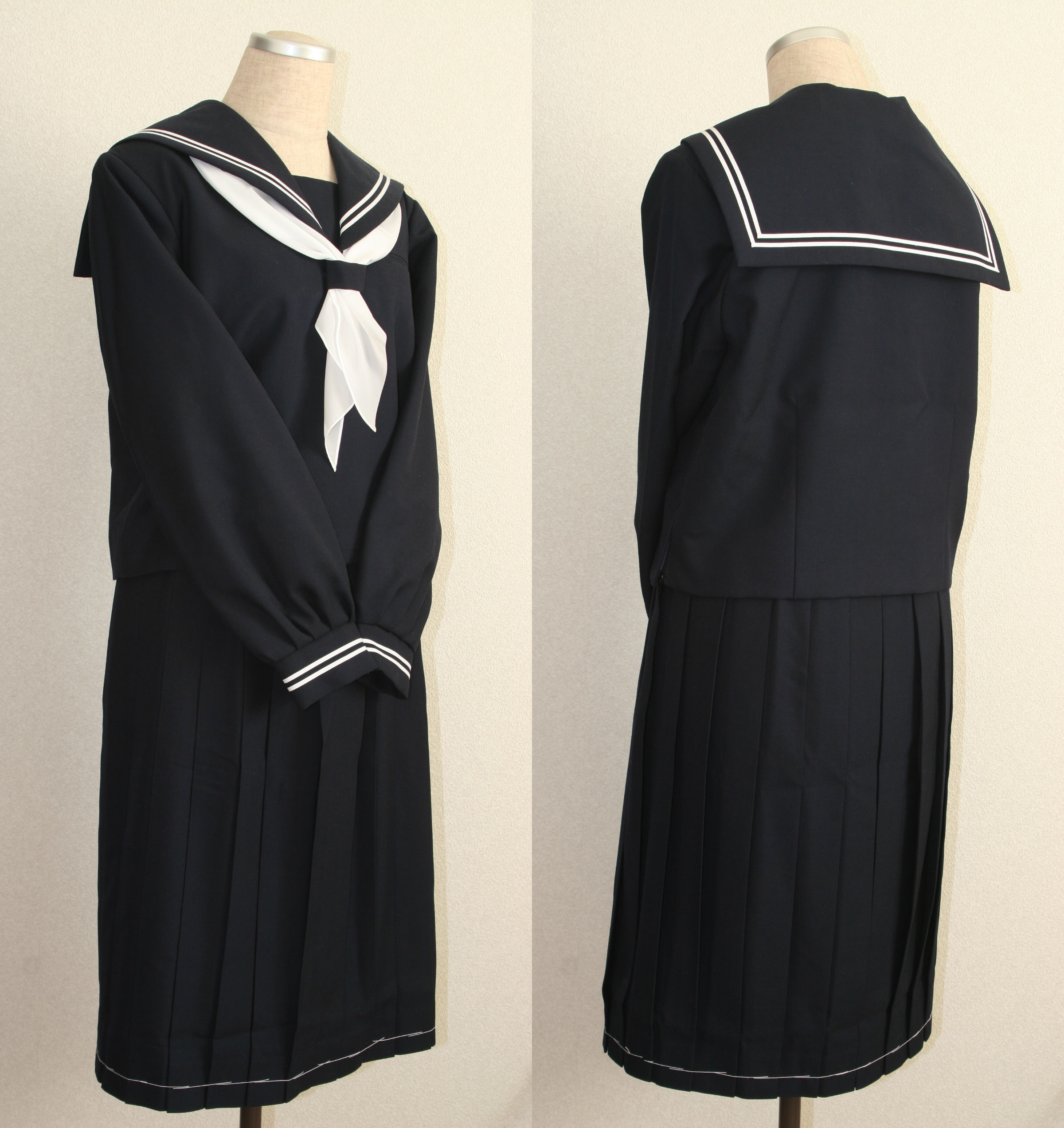
A typical sailor fuku with long sleeves for autumn and winter

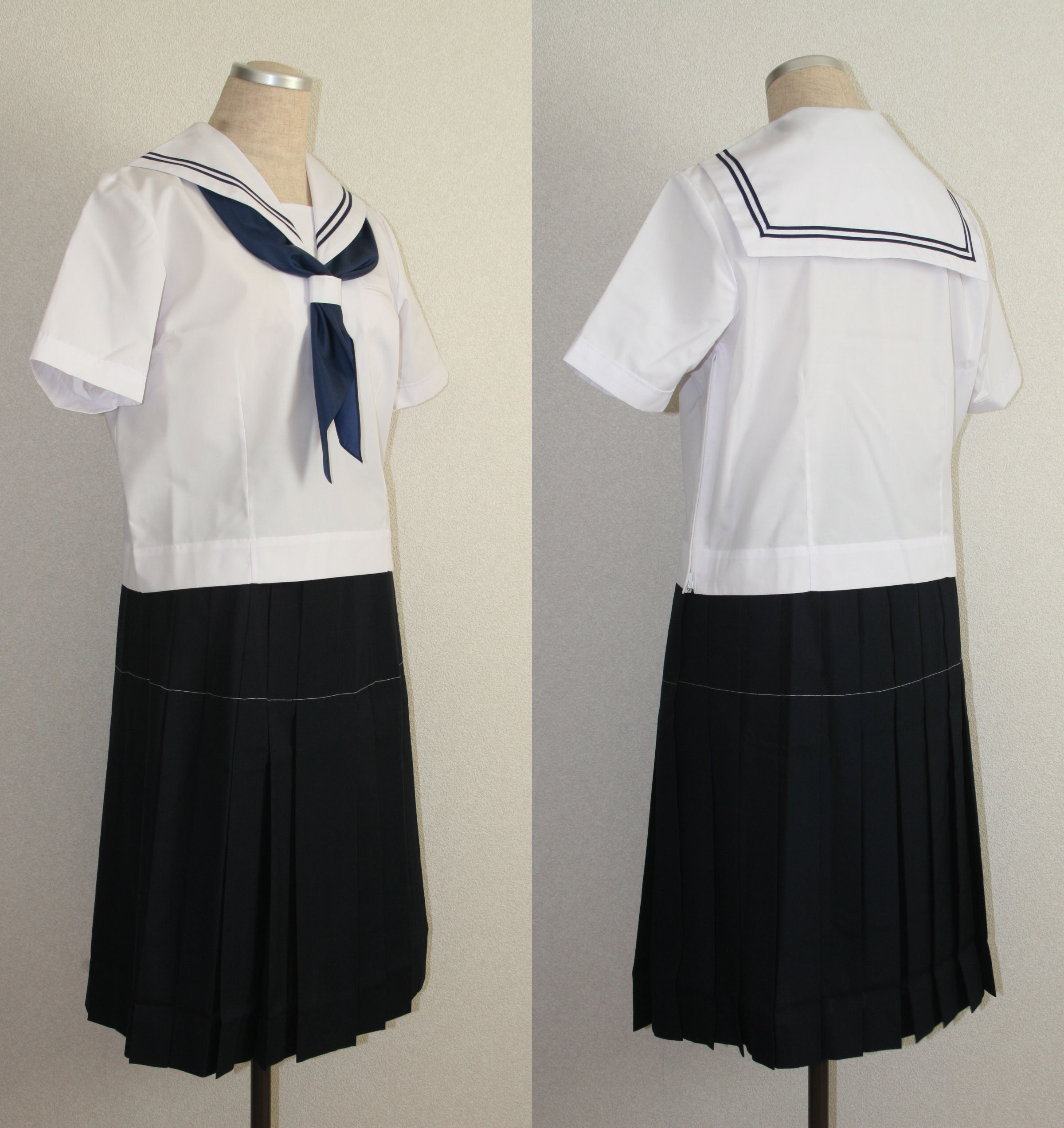
A typical sailor fuku with short sleeves for spring and summer

The majority of Japan's junior high and high schools require students to wear school uniforms. Female Japanese school uniforms are noted for their sailor aesthetics, a characteristic adopted in the early 20th century to imitate the popular sailor dress trend occurring in Western nations. The aesthetic also arose from a desire to imitate military style dress, particularly in the design choices for male uniforms. These school uniforms were introduced in Japan in the late 19th century, replacing the traditional kimono. Today, school uniforms are common in many Japanese public and private schools. The Japanese word for the sailor style of uniform is sailor fuku (セーラー服).

== History ==
The use of school uniforms in Japan began in the mid-19th century. Previously, students had worn standard everyday clothes to school: kimono for female students, with hakama for male students. During the Meiji period, students began to wear uniforms modelled after Western dress.

=== Late 19th century: The Hakama era ===
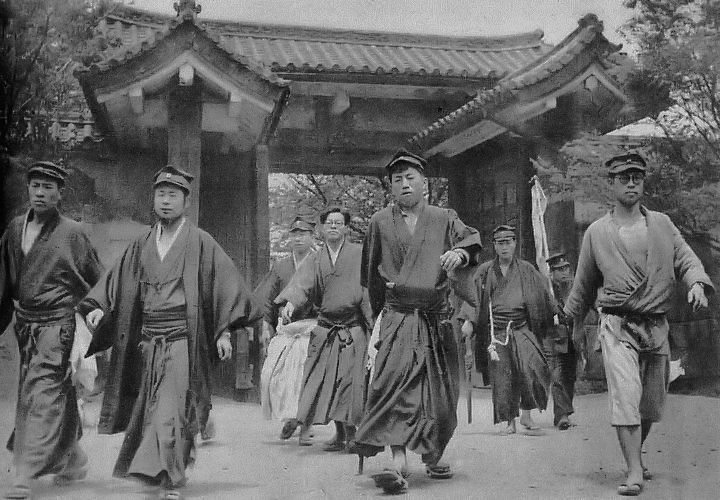
Bankara students in 1949, wearing hakama and uniform caps

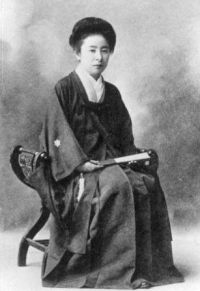
Shimoda Utako in hakama; she was an advocate for dress reform.

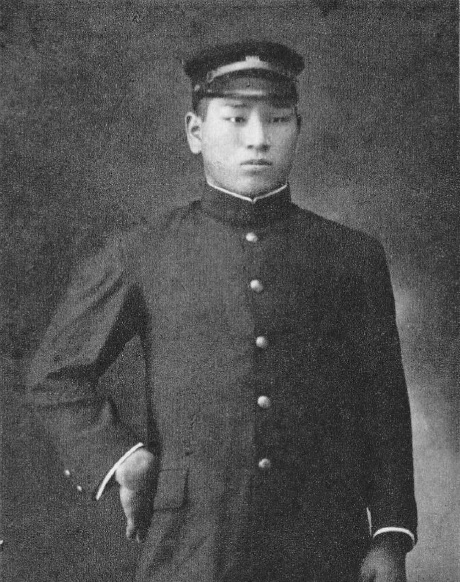
A 1917 gakuran with cap

In the 1880s female students wore Western dress, but this came to be considered impractical. Utako Shimoda, a women's activist, educator and dress reformer, found traditional kimono to be too restrictive. She argued that the Kimono prevented women and girls from moving and taking part in physical activities, thus harming their health. While western dress was being adopted at the time, she also believed corsets to be restrictive and also harmful to women's health. Utako Shimoda had worked as lady-in-waiting to Empress Shōken from 1871 to 1879. She adapted the clothing worn by ladies-in-waiting at the Japanese imperial court, which included hakama, to make a uniform for her Jissen Women's University. During the Meiji period (1868–1912) and the following Taishō period (1912–1926), other women's schools also adopted the hakama. It became standard wear for high schools in Japan, and is still worn by many women at their university graduations.

During the Taishō period, male students began to wear gakuran (matching black trousers and a tunic with a standing collar and five gold buttons, and geta). These, apart from the footwear, are still worn today.

=== Early 20th century: Introduction of the Serafuku ===
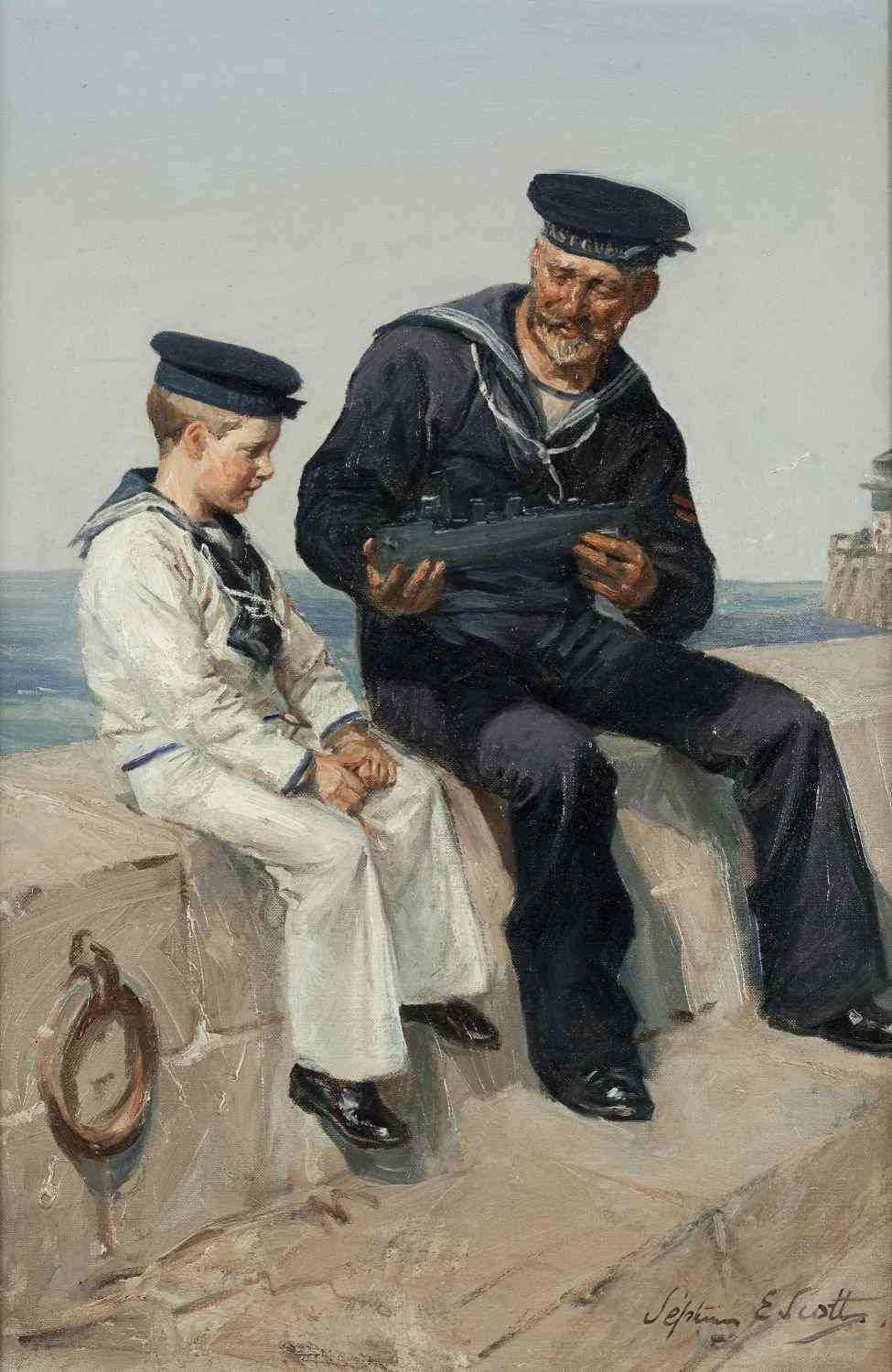
This painting Seafaring Men (1900) by Sep E. Scott, depicts a British sailor in uniform and a child in imitation dress.

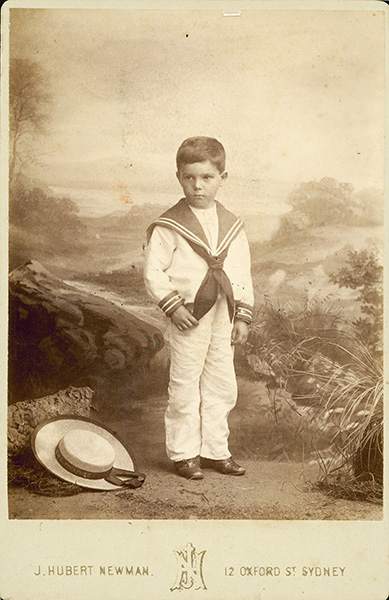
Sailor-inspired outfits were popular for women and children at the start of the 20th century in the UK and US

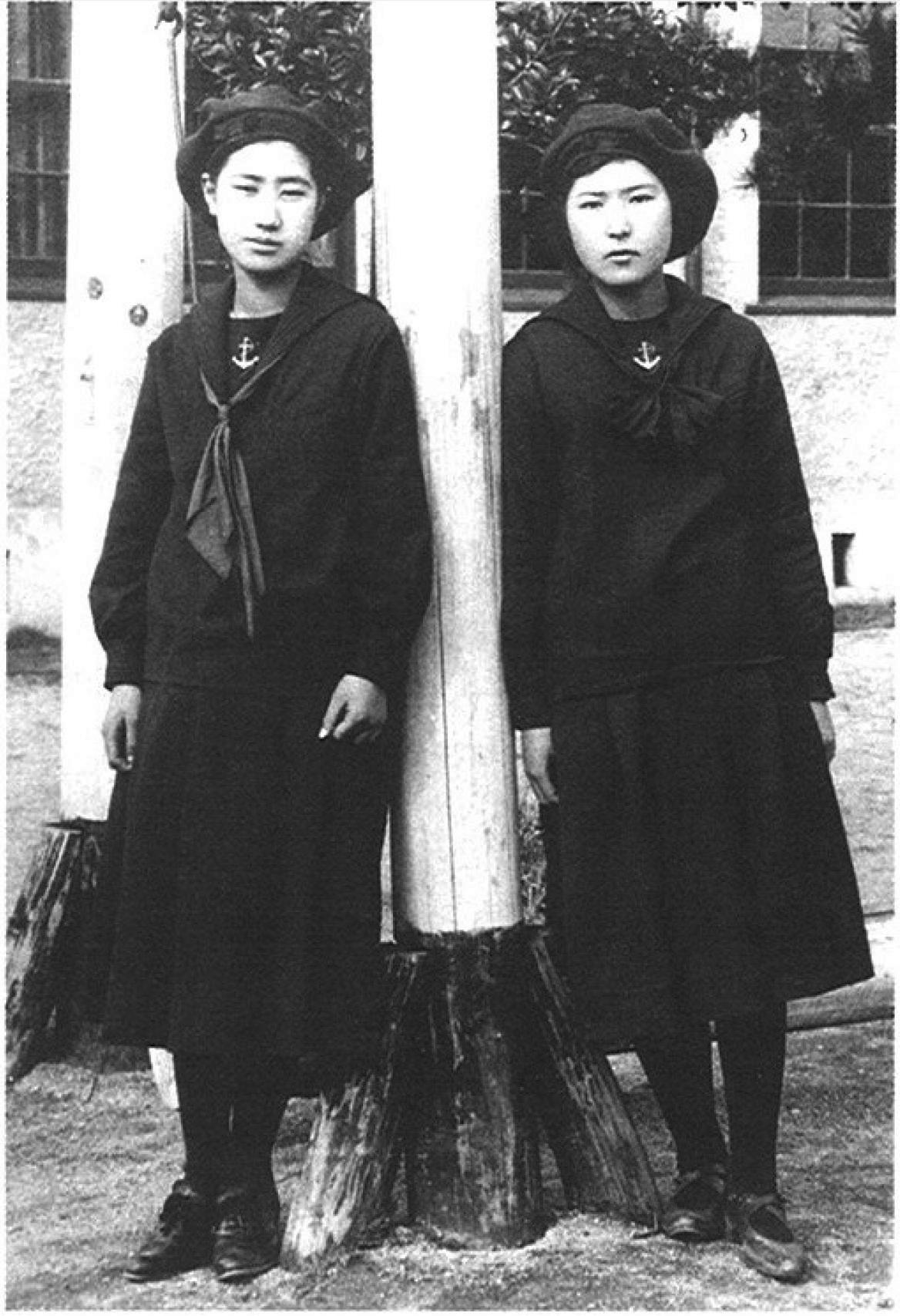
A photograph of students at Fukuoka Jo Gakuin University wearing the Serafuku in the 1920s

The 1920s saw the introduction of European/American-style naval uniforms, called serafuku in Japanese. The idea was taken from scaled-down sailor suits worn by children coming from royal European families, while also drawing inspiration from American female sailor dresses that had been a popular trend amongst the youth of America in the early 20th century. It was relatively easy to sew and thus was easily adopted in the country. Fukuoka Jo Gakuin University adopted the serafuku in 1921, while evidence suggests Heian Jogakuin University may have adopted the serafuku as early as 1920.

=== World War II era ===
During World War II, student uniforms became militarised and were altered to reflect that schoolgirls were being drafted as factory workers to replace men who had gone to the front lines. Wearing skirts was deemed impractical, and so loose slacks known as Monpe (a traditional Japanese farming outfit) were issued as alternatives. Students were also required to wear large name tags (na-fuda) bearing their name, address, and blood type for emergency identification. Additionally, head-protecting cushions (boku-zukin) were distributed to prepare for air raids.

=== Mid 20th century ===
Following World War II and the occupation of Japan by the United States, many schools adopted a more Western-patterned Catholic school uniform style. Compulsory education was extended to include junior high school, and public schools were required to become coeducational. With the establishment of numerous junior high schools nationwide, uniforms for boys and girls were altered. While most public junior high schools retained the traditional gakuran for boys and sailor uniforms for girls, some parents and educators felt uncomfortable with these uniforms' military associations. Seeking a more peaceful image, certain schools adopted uniforms inspired by those from abroad. The blazer was introduced, especially in urban areas, and became increasingly popular. Additionally, with the advent of synthetic fabrics, durable, colourful uniforms could be produced at lower cost, fostering greater variety.

Many home economics classes in Japan until the 1950s gave sewing sailor outfits as assignments. Girls sewed sailor outfits for younger children in their communities.

=== Late 20th century ===
During the counterculture era of the 1970s in Japan, many left-wing and youth-led movements called for the abolishment of school uniforms in Japan entirely. These groups characterised the seifuku and gakuran as manifestations of Japanese authoritarianism.

In the 1970s and 1980s, sukeban gangs began modifying uniforms by making skirts longer and shortening the tops, and so schools began switching to blazer or sweater vest style uniforms to try to combat the effect.

In 1986, the Akashi School Uniform Company published the book “Seifuku Kakumei” (School Uniform Revolution), which successfully advocated that high schools should have their own unique variants of the seifuku. Two years later, in 1988, the company introduced student uniforms designed by the fashion designer Hanae Mori, sparking a trend where other uniform companies began collaborating with well-known designers to create stylish uniforms. Amongst the designers who became involved in uniform design following Hanae Mori was Kansai Yamamoto.

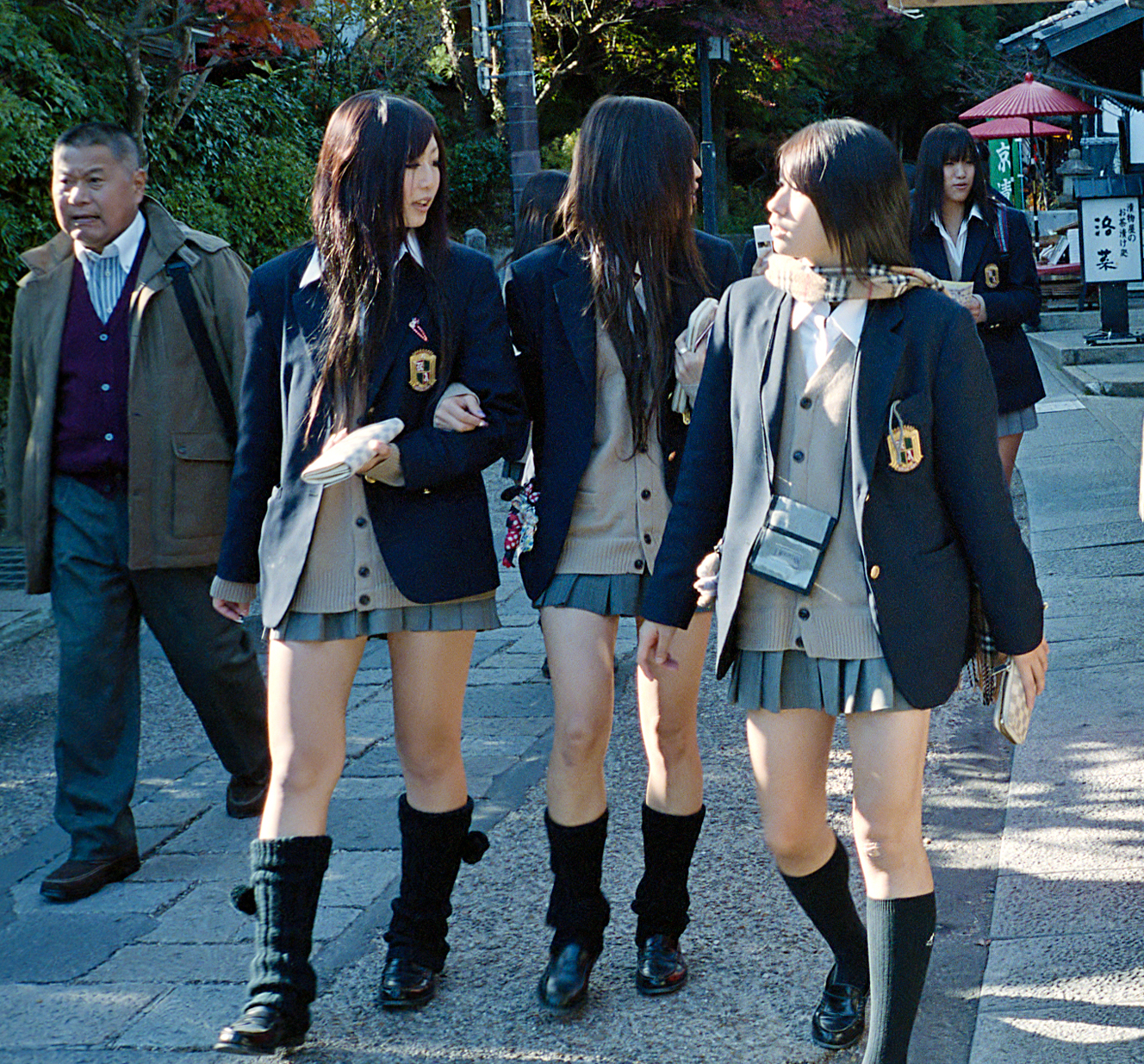
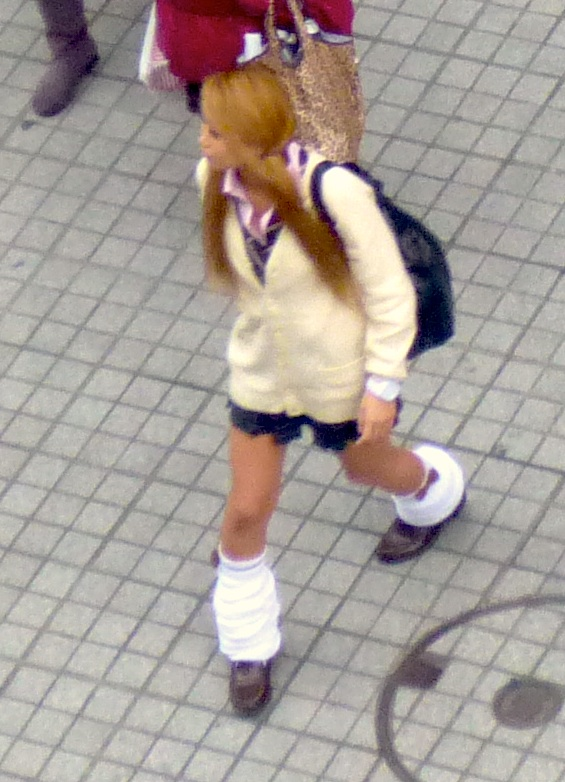
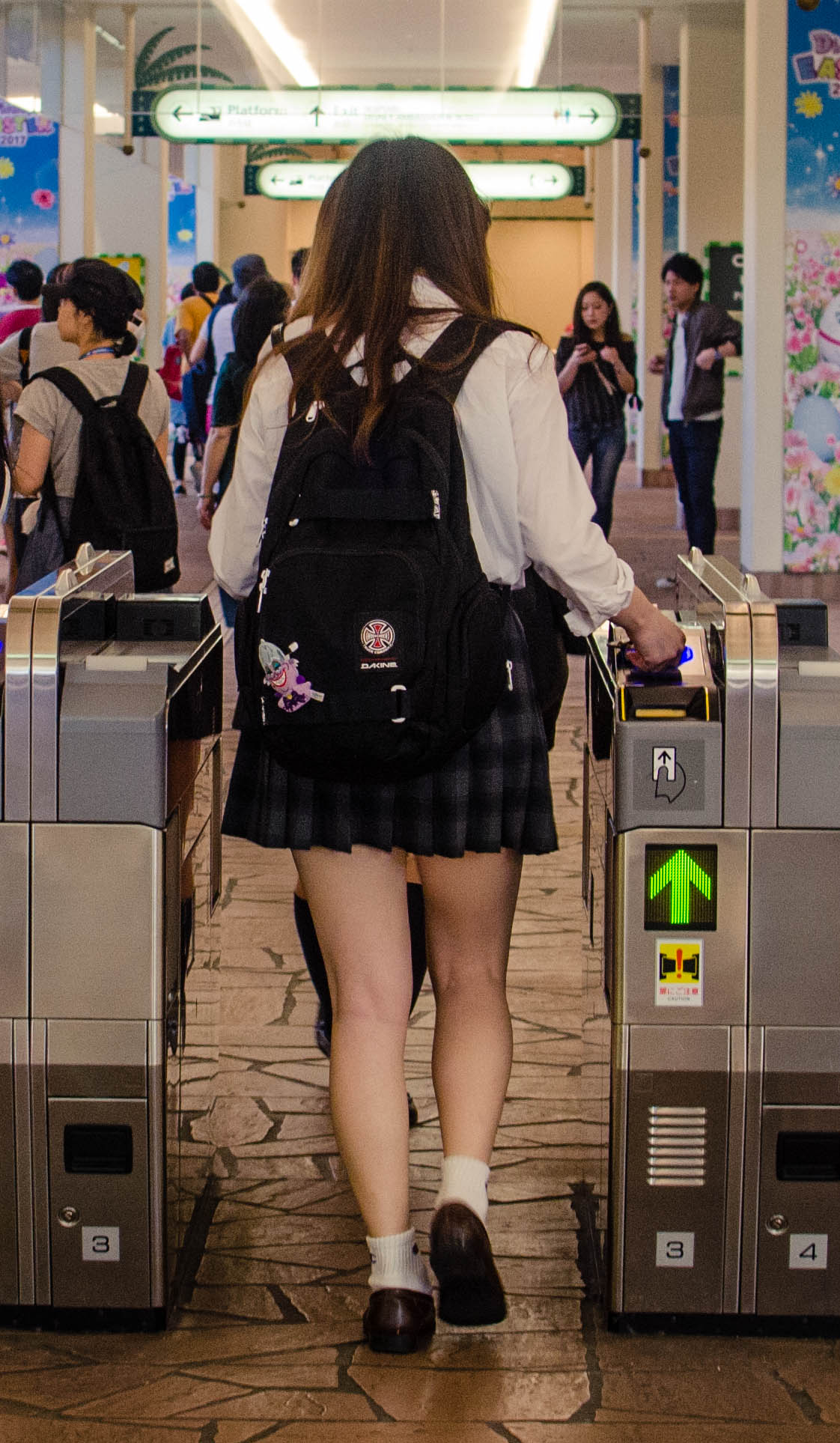
Kogal culture: Japanese schoolgirls wearing short skirts and loose socks.

During the 1980s and 1990s, Japan experienced a period of economic prosperity often referred to as the "Bubble Era." This period brought significant cultural shifts, especially among young people, who embraced the concept of kawaii (cute) as a form of self-expression. Schoolgirls, in particular, became trendsetters by adopting playful and colourful fashion elements into their uniforms. The sailor uniform remained popular, but it was often customized with longer skirts, colourful ribbons, and loose socks. Another popular style combines sailor uniforms with casual elements like cardigans and loafers. This trend coincided with the emergence of the kogal subculture, where girls tanned their skin, dyed their hair blonde or brown, and wore shortened skirts. While these styles were seen as rebellious, they were also perceived as empowering expressions of individuality. This fashion movement significantly influenced Japanese pop culture, from music videos to television dramas, and sparked international interest in Japanese youth fashion.

=== 21st century ===
As Japan entered the 21st century, educational reforms and societal changes led to the gradual standardization of school uniforms. Many schools moved away from sailor suits in favour of blazer uniforms, which were considered more practical and professional. These new uniforms typically featured pleated skirts, blazers, ties, and loafers for girls, while boys wore blazers with trousers and ties. The gyaru subculture of the 2000s, with its bold fashion statements, continued to influence school uniform modifications. However, as social norms tightened and dress codes became stricter, overt customization became less common. Instead, the focus shifted towards more subtle personalisation, such as varying the style of socks or adding discreet accessories.

As of 2012, 50% of Japanese junior high schools and 20% of senior high schools use sailor suit uniforms. The Asahi Shimbun stated in 2012 that, "The sailor suit is changing from adorable and cute, a look that 'appeals to the boys,' to a uniform that "girls like to wear for themselves." As of that year, contemporary sailor suits have front closures with zippers or snaps and more constructed bodices. The Asahi Shimbun stated that "the form is snug to enhance the figure—the small collar helps the head look smaller, for better balance."

In the 2020s a few Japanese high schools are introducing items such as summer polo shirts and gender-neutral blazer options to accommodate student preferences.

== Usage ==
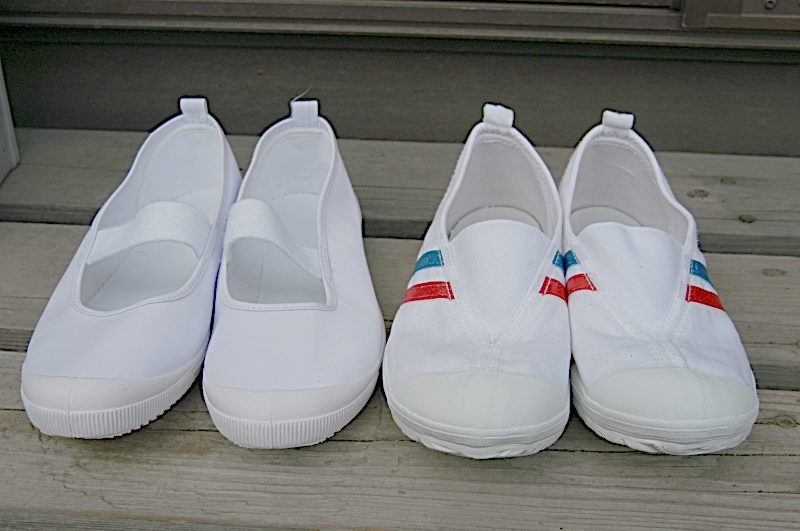
In almost all schools, Japanese students are required to take off the shoes they wear outdoors and wear different indoor shoes. At some schools, students wear uwabaki, a kind of soft slipper meant to be used only indoors.

The Japanese junior and senior-high-school uniform traditionally consists of a military-styled uniform for boys and a sailor outfit for girls. These uniforms are based on Meiji-period formal military dress, themselves modeled on American/European-style naval uniforms. The sailor outfits replace the undivided hakama (known as andon bakama (行灯袴)) designed by Utako Shimoda between 1920 and 1930. While this style of uniform is in use, many schools have moved to more Western-pattern Catholic school uniform styles. These uniforms consist of a white shirt, tie, blazer with school crest, and tailored trousers (often not of the same colour as the blazer) for boys and a white blouse, tie, blazer with school crest, and tartan culottes or skirt for girls.

Regardless of what type of uniform any particular school assigns its students, all schools have a summer version of the uniform (usually consisting of just a white dress shirt and the uniform slacks for boys and a reduced-weight traditional uniform or blouse and tartan skirt with tie for girls) and a sports-activity uniform (a polyester track suit for year-round use and a T-shirt and short pants for summer activities). Depending on the discipline level of any particular school, students may often wear different seasonal and activity uniforms within the same classroom during the day. Individual students may attempt to subvert the system of uniforms by wearing their uniforms incorrectly or by adding prohibited elements such as large loose socks or badges. Girls may shorten their skirts, permanently or by wrapping up the top to decrease length; boys may wear trousers about the hips, omit ties, or keep their shirts unbuttoned.

Since some schools do not have sex-segregated changing- or locker-rooms, students may change for sporting activities in their classrooms. As a result, such students may wear their sports uniforms under their classroom uniforms. Certain schools also regulate student hairstyles, footwear, and book bags; but these particular rules are usually adhered to only on special occasions, such as trimester opening and closing ceremonies and school photo days.

It is normal for uniforms to be worn outside of school areas, but this is going out of fashion and many students wear casual dress outside of school. While not many public elementary schools in Japan require uniforms, many private schools and public schools run by the central government still do so.

== Types ==
The design and uniform policy vary from school to school and the following descriptions are not intended to list all examples.

=== Gakuran ===
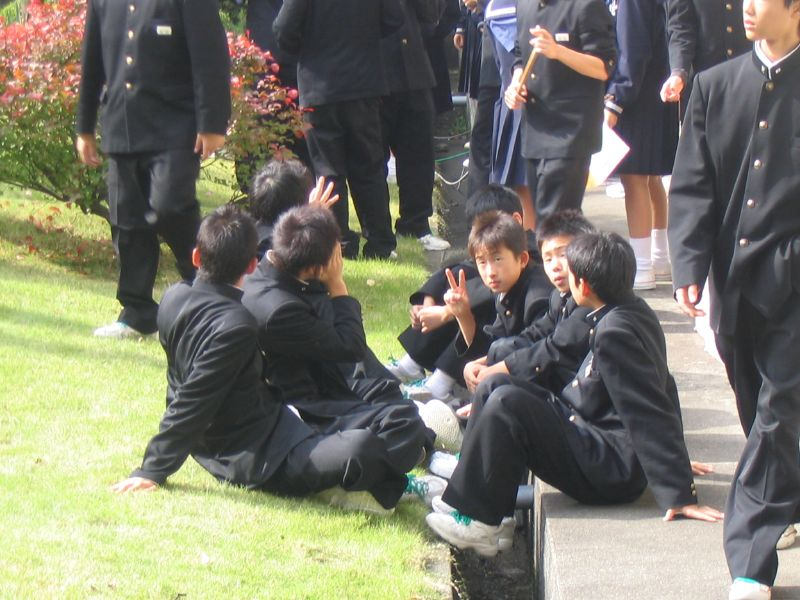
A group of Japanese schoolboys in gakuran

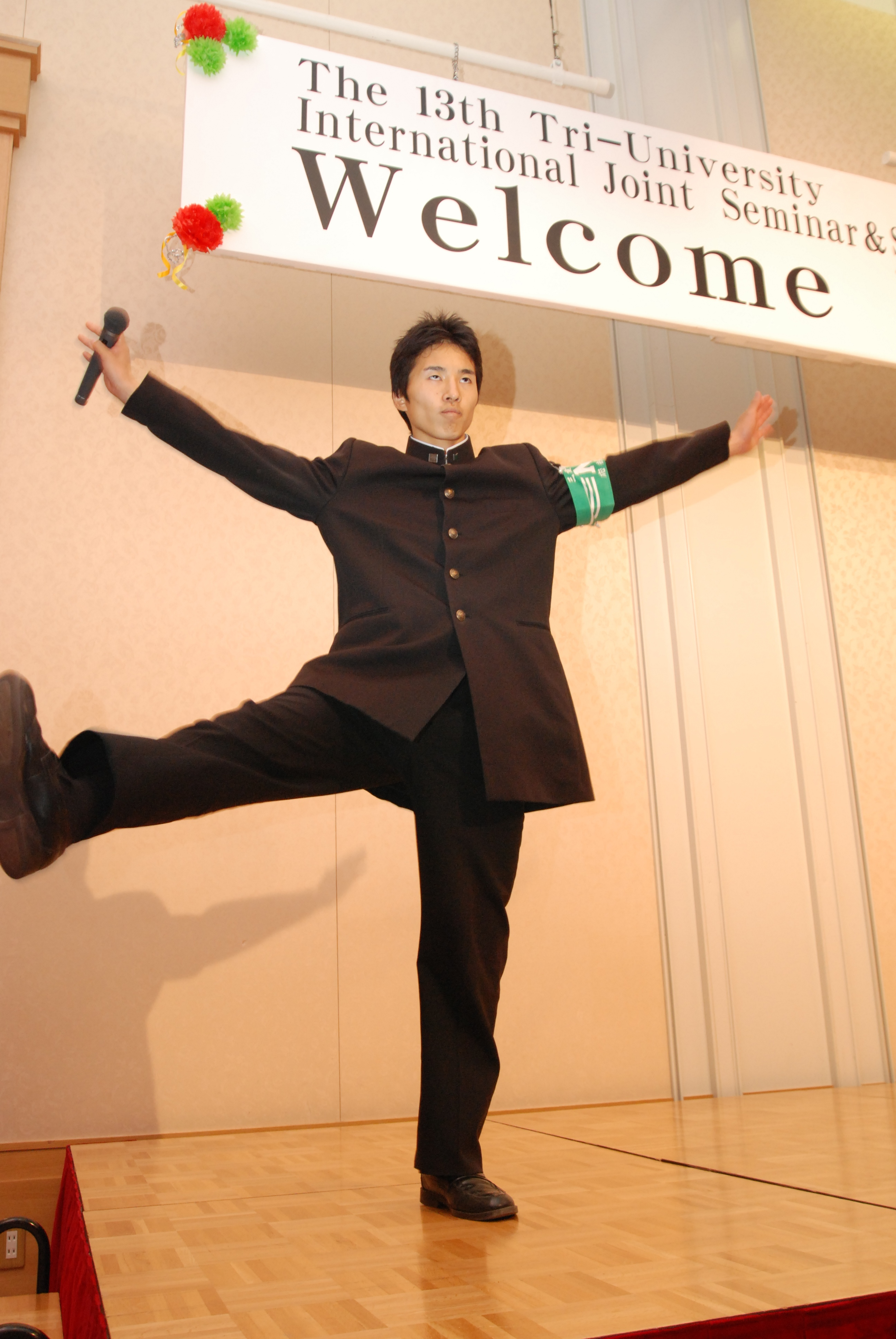
An ōendan cheerleader in gakuran

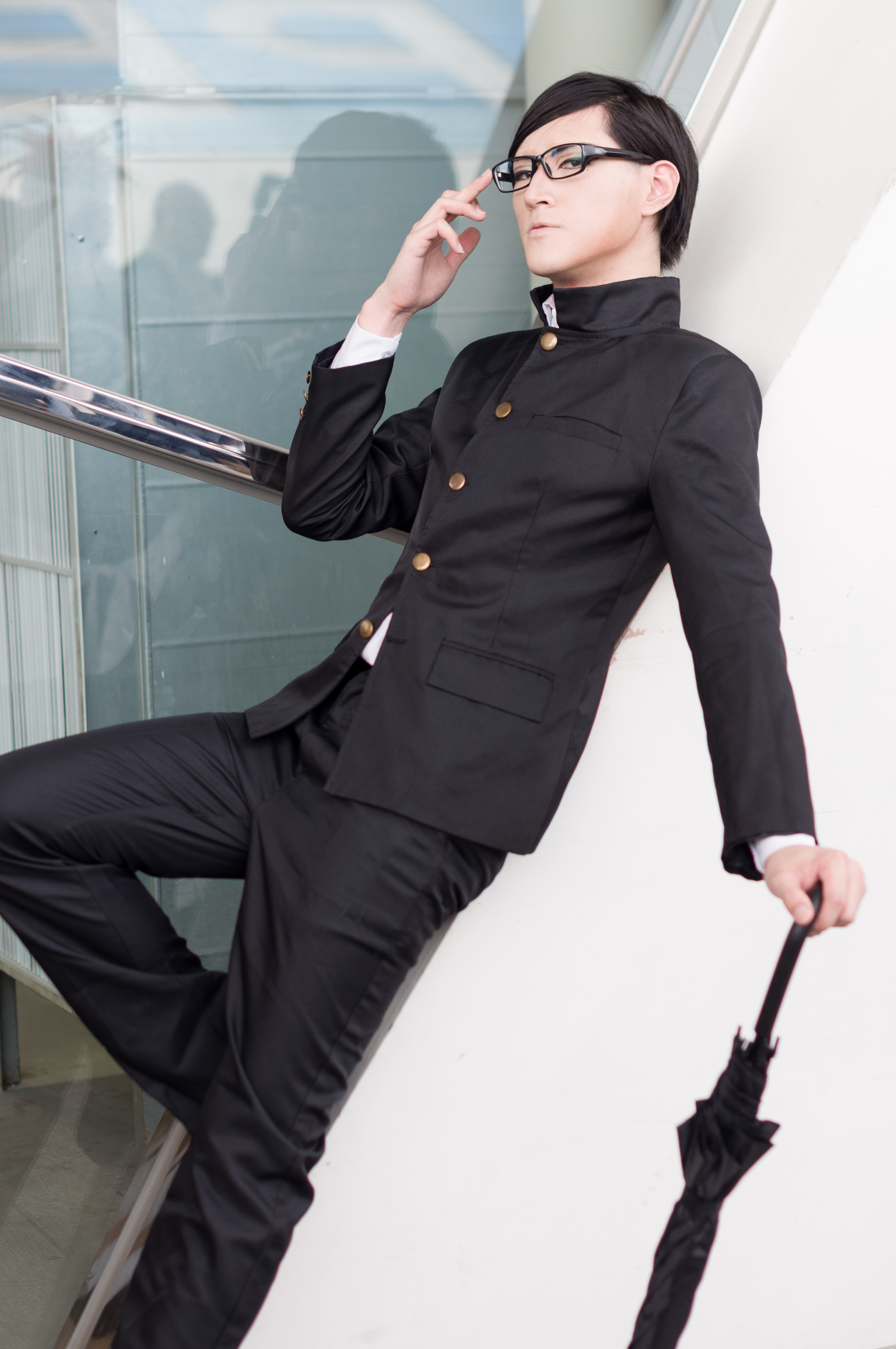
A cosplayer in gakuran

The gakuran (学蘭), also called the tsume-eri (詰襟), is a uniform for junior high school and senior high school boys in Japan. The colour is normally black, but some schools use navy blue. It is worn over a shirt and is typically not worn during hot seasons.

The top has a standing collar buttoning down from top-to-bottom. Buttons are usually decorated with the school emblem to show respect to the school. Pants are straight leg and a black or dark-coloured belt is worn with them. Boys usually wear penny loafers or sneakers with this uniform. Some schools may require the students to wear collar-pins representing the school and/or class rank.

Traditionally, the gakuran is also worn along with a matching (usually black) student cap, although this custom is less common in modern times.

The gakuran is derived from the Prussian Waffenrock. The term is a combination of gaku (学) meaning "study" or "student", and ran (らん/蘭) meaning the Netherlands or, historically in Japan, the West in general; thus, gakuran translates as "Western style clothes for student (uniform)".

The original model of the present day gakuran was first established in 1873 for students of all schools. During the Japanese occupation, such clothing was also brought to school in Korea, Taiwan, and Manchukuo. Nowadays, the gakuran is still worn in some South Korean conservative high schools.

While the gakuran is associated solely as the boys' uniform of both most middle schools and conservative high schools in Japan nowadays, blazers have been adopted in the largest number of high schools in Japan (both public and private).

According to a 2024 survey by Kanko Gakuseifuku Co., among 200 middle school students, 54.5% wore gakuran and 37.0% wore blazers, while among 400 high school students, 47.0% wore blazers and 34.8% wore gakuran.

=== Sailor fuku ===
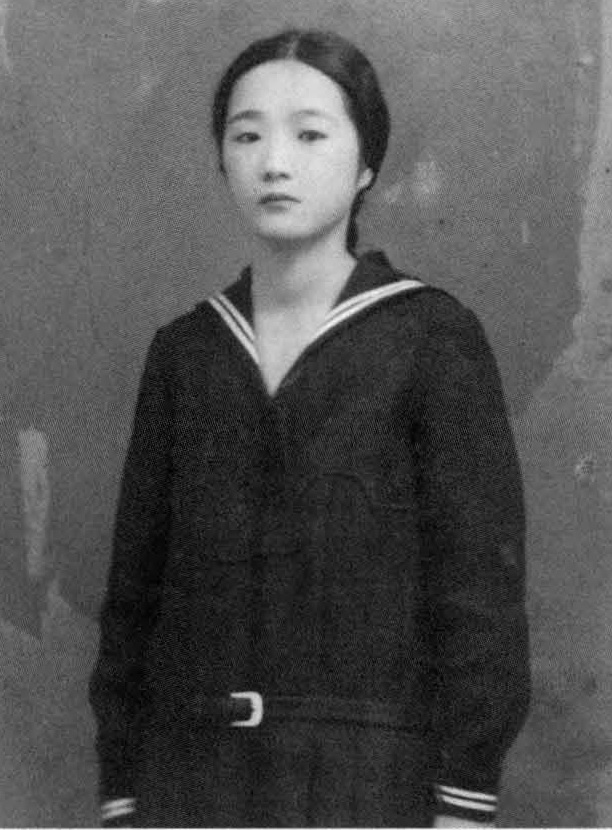
Masako Nakata in sailor fuku, c. 1928

The sailor fuku (セーラー服, sērā fuku; sailor outfit) is a common style of uniform worn by female middle school students, high school students, and occasionally, elementary school students. It was introduced as a school uniform in 1920 at Heian Jogakuin University and 1921 by the principal of Fukuoka Jo Gakuin University, Elizabeth Lee. It was modeled after the uniform used by the British Royal Navy at the time, which Lee had experienced as an exchange student in the United Kingdom, as well as the popular American Sailor dress which at the time had already been a common fashion choice amongst school girls in the United States during the time period since the start of the 20th century.

Much like the male uniform, the gakuran, the sailor outfits bear a similarity to various military-styled naval uniforms. The uniform generally consists of a blouse attached with a sailor-style collar and a pleated skirt. There are seasonal variations for summer and winter; sleeve length and fabric are adjusted accordingly. A ribbon is tied in the front and laced through a loop attached to the blouse. Several variations on the ribbon include neckties, bolo ties, neckerchiefs, and bows. Common colours include navy blue, white, gray, light green, and black.

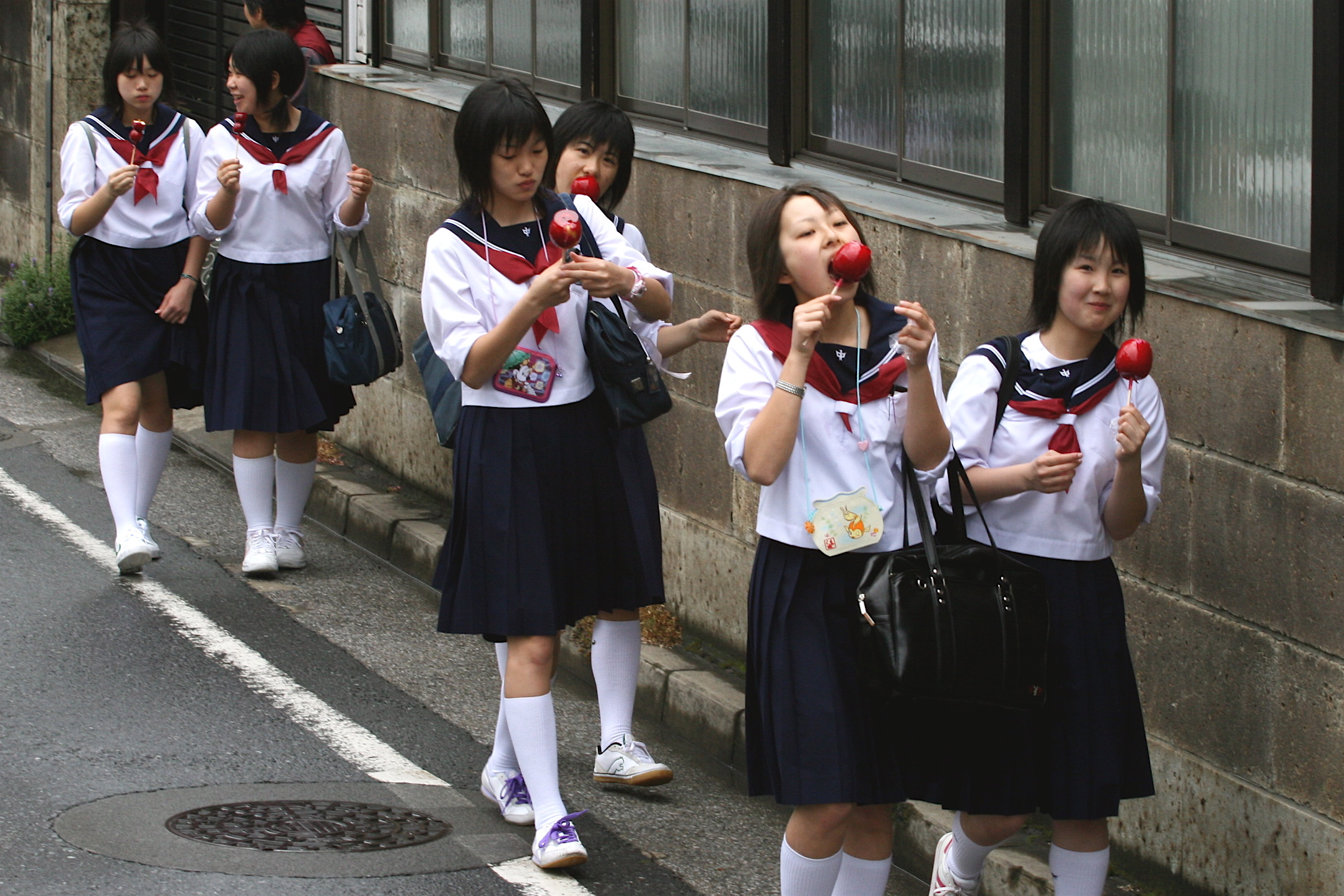
A group of Japanese schoolgirls in sailor suits

Shoes, socks, and other accessories are sometimes included as part of the uniform. These socks are typically navy or white. The shoes are typically brown or black penny loafers. Although not part of the prescribed uniform, alternate forms of legwear (such as loose socks, knee-length stockings, or similar) are also commonly matched by more fashionable girls with their sailor outfits.

The sailor uniform today is generally associated solely with middle schools and conservative high schools, since a majority of high schools have changed to more Western-style tartan skirts or blazers, similar to the Catholic school uniform.

According to a single survey from Seifukugram.com (updated since 2022): as of June 11, 2026, sailor fuku adoption rate of high schools is 15.55% (757 out of 4,869 high schools. Only high schools that adopt sailor fuku as a formal winter uniform are counted.).

According to a 2024 survey by Kanko Gakuseifuku Co., among 200 middle school students, 35.5% wore sailor fuku, 45.5% wore blazer uniforms, and 3.5% wore sailor jackets, while among 400 high school students, 8.3% wore sailor fuku, 69.5% wore blazer uniforms, and 2.8% wore sailor jackets.(All of the figures refer to formal winter uniforms.)

The sailor jacket is a relatively new variant of sailor fuku modified into a button-front style. The sailor blouse is another similar variant.

Its distinctive collar and neckwear are sometimes incorporated into other types of uniforms.

=== Blazer ===
Blazers are common in high schools. They are a relatively frequently adopted school uniform style among newly established high schools or those undergoing uniform redesigns. Some schools prescribe highly specific design, while others only designate mandatory colors or general styles.

For girls, blazers are often worn with a ribbon tie.

Some schools have adopted the "Sailor blazer" (セーラーブレザー) which is a blazer featuring sailor fuku-style collar and neckwear. Since the blazer is the main component of the design, it is considered distinct from the sailor jacket.

=== Eton jacket ===
The Eton jacket is a short jacket with a wide lapel, modeled after the uniform formerly worn by some students at Eton College.

In the context of Japanese school uniforms, the term "Eton jacket" refers to collarless jackets, including traditional Eton-style jackets. It is believed that the name "Eton" was adopted in the 1950s to help popularize this new type of school uniform.

It is primarily used in uniforms for female junior and senior high school students, as well as for both boys and girls in elementary school, although there are some cases in which it is also used as male junior and senior high school uniforms (e.g., Seiko Gakuin).

=== Pinafore ===
The Pinafore is a garment similar to a one-piece dress, but unlike a typical dress that is worn directly over bare skin or underwear, it is designed to be worn over other clothing such as a blouse. It was first adopted as a school uniform in the 1950s and subsequently became widespread in many junior high schools and high schools for female students in Japan, eventually forming a standard part of the typical school uniform.

=== Bolero ===
The Bolero is a short, jacket-style uniform worn over a pinafore, without front button fastenings. It is used in girls' uniforms from kindergarten through high school, and is intended to give a neat and elegant impression (e.g. Seirei Junior and Senior High School).

=== One-piece dress ===
The one-piece dress is a type of girls' school uniform in which the blouse and skirt form a single integrated garment.

Compared to sailor fuku and blazers, it is adopted by fewer schools; however, it has maintained moderate popularity, particularly among private schools and mission schools.

The Westernization of girls' school uniforms progressed during the Taishō era (1912–1926). The introduction of the one-piece uniform in 1919 is considered a major turning point that greatly contributed to the widespread adoption of Western-style uniforms among female students in Japan.

Because the top and bottom are integrated, the one-piece style is less prone to becoming disheveled and is characterized by its neat, modest, and composed appearance.

As with Sailor blazer, some schools have adopted one-piece dresses featuring sailor fuku-style collar and neckwear (e.g.,Kumamoto Gakuen University Fuzoku Junior and Senior High School and Matsuyama Shinonome Junior and Senior High school).

== Genderless uniforms ==
Historically, school uniforms in Japan are decided on the basis of sex, with trousers for male students and skirts for female students. However, in April 2019, public junior high schools in Tokyo's Nakano Ward began allowing students to choose their uniform regardless of sex. This started with a sixth grader who did not want to wear skirts in junior high school and asked her female classmates for their opinions on uniforms. The responses showed that most of her classmates also wanted the freedom to choose their uniforms. The young student delivered the survey results to the mayor of Nakano, and all of the principals for the ward's public junior high schools agreed on the proposal, allowing students to freely choose their uniforms. Schools allowing trousers for female students rose to 600 in 2019 from only four in 1997, and over 400 schools adopted genderless uniforms for 2022's fiscal year. There was a lot of support from female students for the adaptation of genderless uniforms and the implementation of slacks since it allowed for more comfort by keeping their legs warm and making it easier to ride their bicycles. The decision for genderless uniforms is also in consideration of sexual minority students.

In addition to changes made in the uniform, schools made adaptations to the school bags and uniforms for outside-of-class activities. In 2022, genderless swimwear was introduced at a few high schools and has quickly spread to more schools throughout Japan. Genderless swimwear gradually evolved from the need to protect against sunburn to a desire to deemphasize body shape by adding more coverage.

== Cultural significance ==
School uniform varies throughout different schools in Japan, with some schools known for their particular uniforms. School uniforms are a major factor in deciding which school to attend, and there are students who admire a particular uniform and decide to enter that school because of it. School uniform can have a nostalgic characteristic for former students, and are often associated with relatively carefree youth. Uniforms are sometimes modified by students as a means of exhibiting individualism. This is done in ways such as lengthening or shortening the skirt, removing the ribbon, hiding patches or badges under the collar, etc. In past decades, brightly coloured variants of the sailor outfits were also adopted by Japanese yankii, sukeban and bōsōzoku biker gangs.

== See also ==
- Education in Japan
- Sailor dress
- School uniforms by country#Japan
