= Airi Nakajima =

Japanese actress and gravure idol (born 1990)

- 中島 愛里
- Born: August 13, 1990 (age 35); Kanagawa Prefecture, Japan
- Other name: Airin
- Occupations: Actress, gravure idol
- Years active: 2006 -
- Agent: Sense Up
- Height: 1.57 m (5 ft 2 in) (2014)

Airi Nakajima (中島 愛里, Nakajima Airi; born August 13, 1990, in Kanagawa Prefecture, Japan) is a Japanese actress and gravure idol who is represented by the talent agency, Sense Up. She is nicknamed Airin (アイリーン, Airīn).

== Biography ==
In 2007, Nakajima was elected as a finalist on Miss Magazine 2007. She was awarded the "Miss Shūkan Shōnen Magazine" prize in July.

On July 15, Nakajima has been carried out in the unveiling event of Miss Magazine 2007 at Sunshine City, Fountain Square, Ikebukuro, Tokyo. In the same event, Miss Magazine uniforms are passed, which were formally subscribed to the Miss Magazine football team. Her uniform number is 7 (25 until February 2009). At the uniform on the back it is written as "Eye-ri". She graduated from Kangawa Prefectural Ikuta East High School.

== Filmography ==
=== TV series ===
Year	Title	Role	Network	Notes
2009	Smile	Yuki Takasaki	TBS	Episode 1
2009	Love Game	Kaoru Aizawa (high school)	YTV	Episode 7
2009	Boku no Himitsu Heiki	Rika Konishi	NBN	Episode 2
2010	Peacemaker Kurogane	Akesato	MBS, TBS	
2011	Taisetsunakoto wa Subete Kimi ga Oshiete Kureta	Airi Nakano	Fuji TV	
2012	Keishichō Minamidaira Han: Nana-ri no Keiji	Yukari	TBS	Episode 5
2013	Shokatsu Deka	Nana Higuchi	Fuji TV	Episode 8
2013	Tank Top Fighter	Kanae Hirano / Kaon	TBS	Episode 5
2014	Team: Keishichō Tokubetsu Hanzai Sōsa Honbu	Fumika Aoyagi	TV Asahi	Episode 3
2014	Woman Won't Allow It	Kobashi's wife	TBS	Episode 9
2015	Saikyō no Hōtei Saibankan Sakurako to 10-ri no Hyōketsu	Ayaka Sasaki	TV Tokyo	
2015	Uroborosu: Kono Ai Koso, Seigi		TBS	
2015	Flowers for Algernon		TBS	

=== Films ===
Year	Title	Role	Notes	Ref.
2009	Jaws in Japan			
2011	Ishi no Furu Oka	Shodai Ishikawa		
2012	Life Is Dead	Aoi Sakurai		
2013	Yoake Zen Asayake-chū	Fuyumi Kawaguchi		
2014	Gekijō-ban Tokyo Sensetsu Yuganda Igyō Toshi	Shihomi		
2015	Zenkai no Uta	Tsubaki Takamine		
