= Portrait of Albert Edward, Prince of Wales (Winterhalter, 1846) =

Painting by Franz Xaver Winterhalter

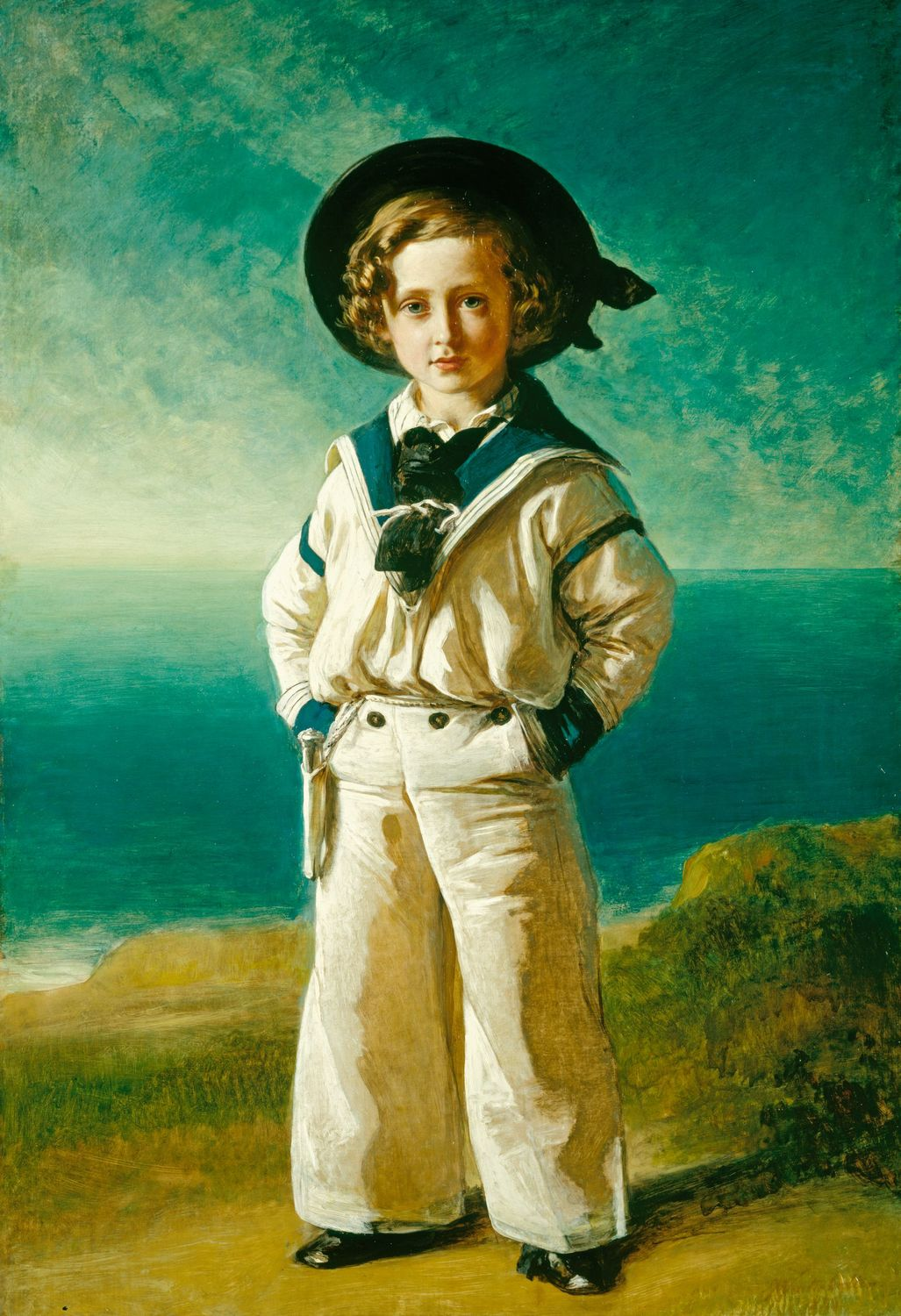
- Artist: Franz Xaver Winterhalter
- Year: 1846
- Type: Oil on canvas, portrait painting
- Dimensions: 127.1 cm × 88 cm (50.0 in × 35 in)
- Location: Royal Collection

Portrait of Albert Edward, Prince of Wales is an oil on canvas portrait painting of Albert Edward, Prince of Wales, by the German artist Franz Xaver Winterhalter, from 1846. It depicts the sitter at the age of four, dressed in a sailor suit with the English Channel behind him. The eldest son of Queen Victoria, he would eventually succeed her on the throne in 1901 as King Edward VII and gave his name to the Edwardian era. The painting was commissioned by Queen Victoria and given to her husband Prince Albert as a Christmas present. The former Prime Minister Robert Peel described it as "the prettiest picture I have ever seen". The picture is in the Royal Collection.

== See also ==
- The Royal Family, another 1846 painting by Winterhalter that features the prince

== Bibliography ==
- Rose Clare. Making, Selling and Wearing Boys' Clothes in Late-Victorian England Taylor & Francis, 2016. ISBN 0754664449.
- Scott, Jennifer Anne. The Royal Portrait: Image and Impact. Royal Collection Publications, 2010 ISBN 1905686137.
