= Sailor suit =

Military uniform

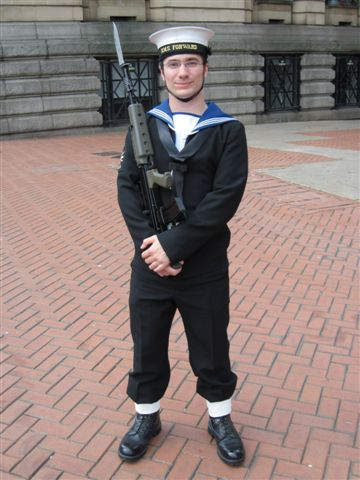
A Royal Naval rating in 1A uniform (a modern sailor suit).

A sailor suit is a uniform that originated in the United Kingdom, traditionally worn by enlisted seamen in a navy or other governmental sea services. It later developed into a popular clothing style for children, especially as dress clothes and school uniforms.

== Origins and history ==
In the Royal Navy, the sailor suit, also called naval rig, is known as Number One dress and is worn by able rates and leading hands. It is primarily ceremonial, although it dates from the old working rig of Royal Navy sailors which has continuously evolved since its first introduction in 1857. Versions have been adopted by many navies from around the world.

The flap collar is perhaps the most recognizable item of the sailor suit. It is often considered lucky to touch a sailor's collar. The bell-bottomed trousers were designed so that they could be rolled up easily when scrubbing the decks.

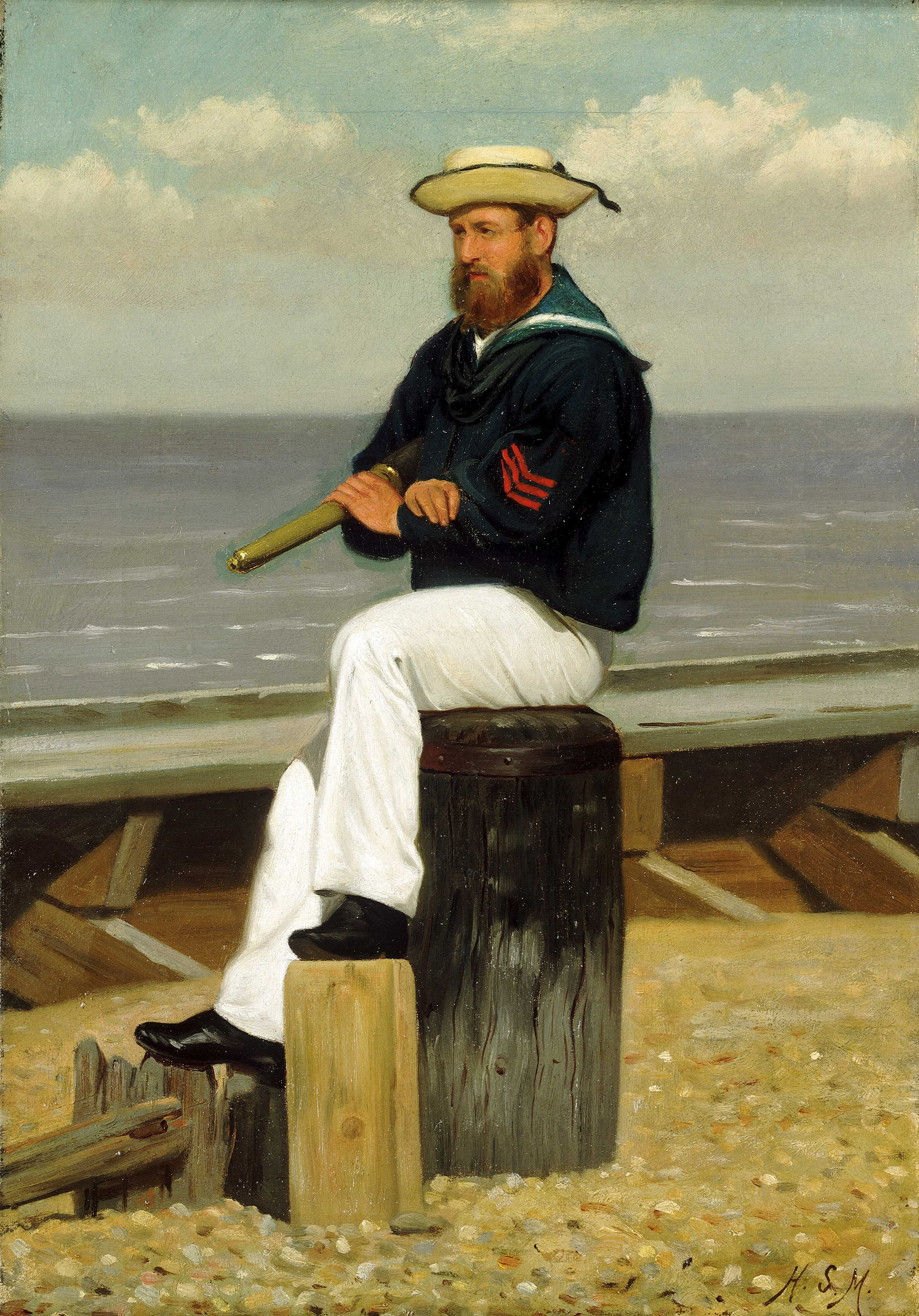
A Royal Navy sailor, about 1855

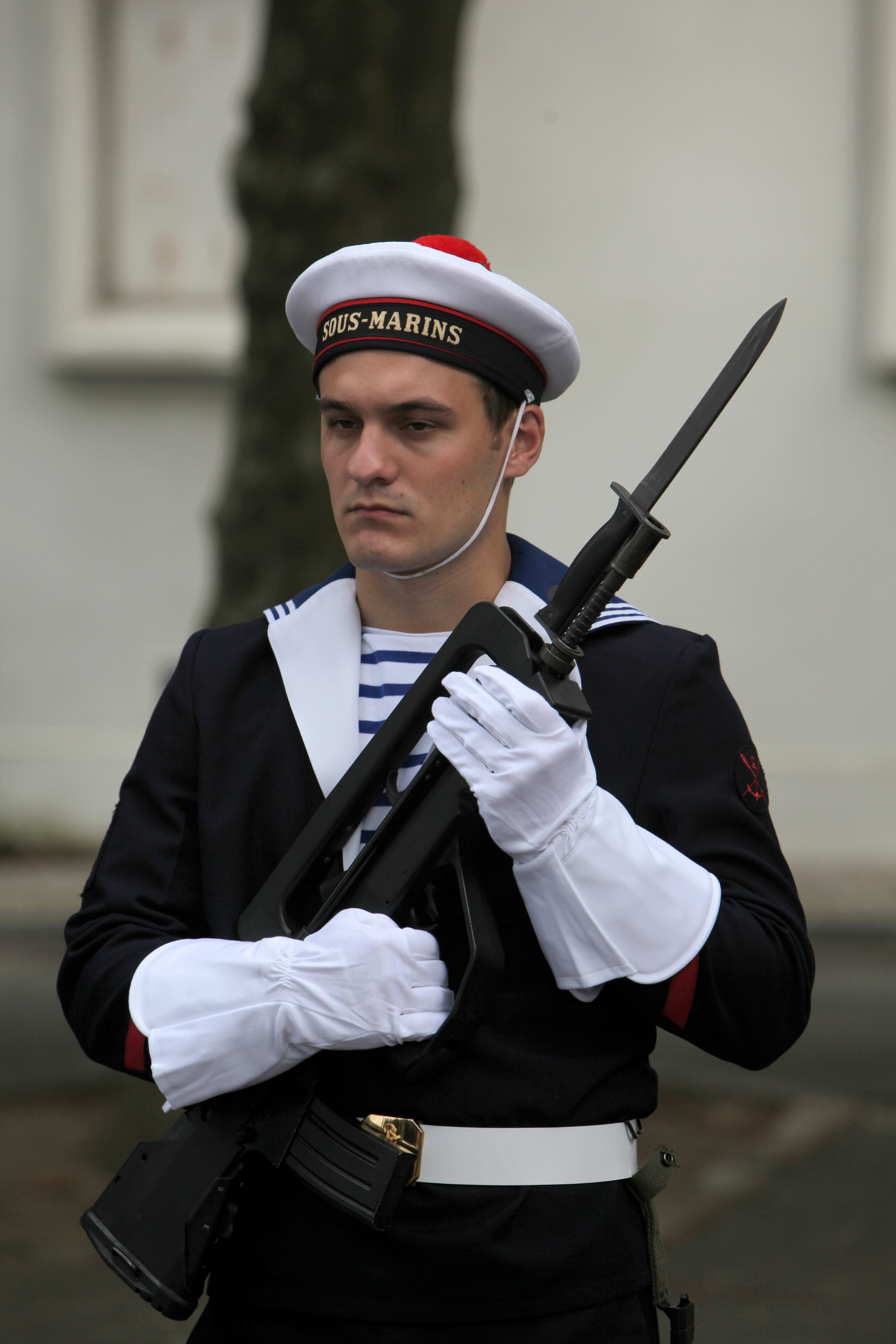
French Navy submariner, Brest, 2015

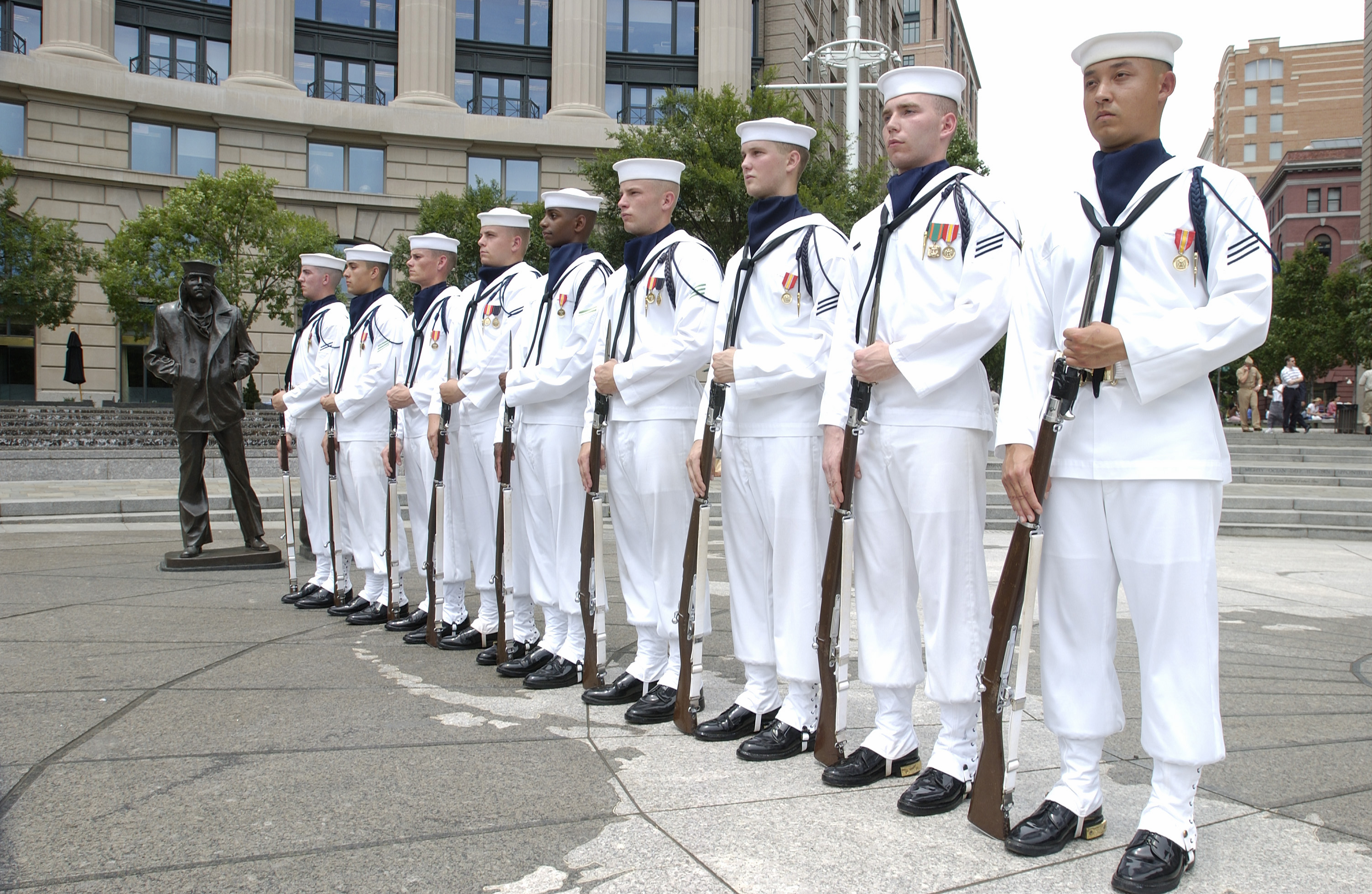
United States Navy Ceremonial Guard, 2003

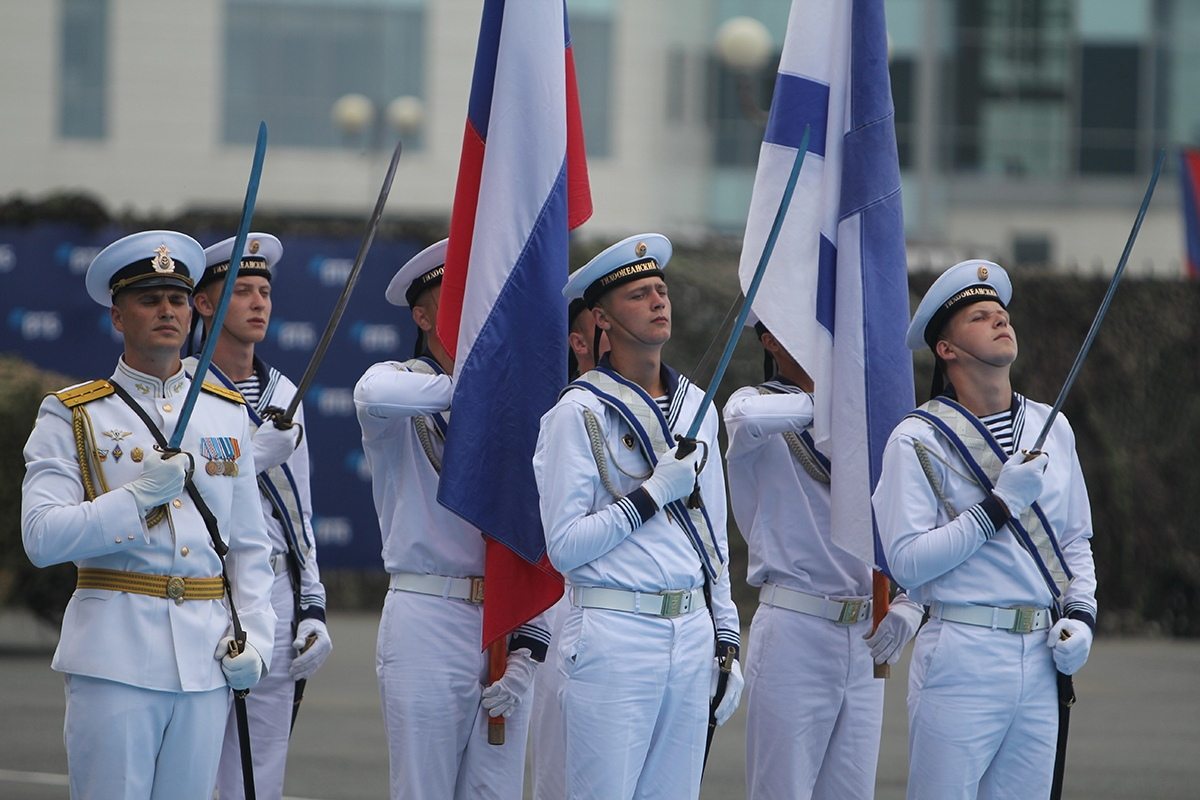
Russian Navy sailors and officers, 2023

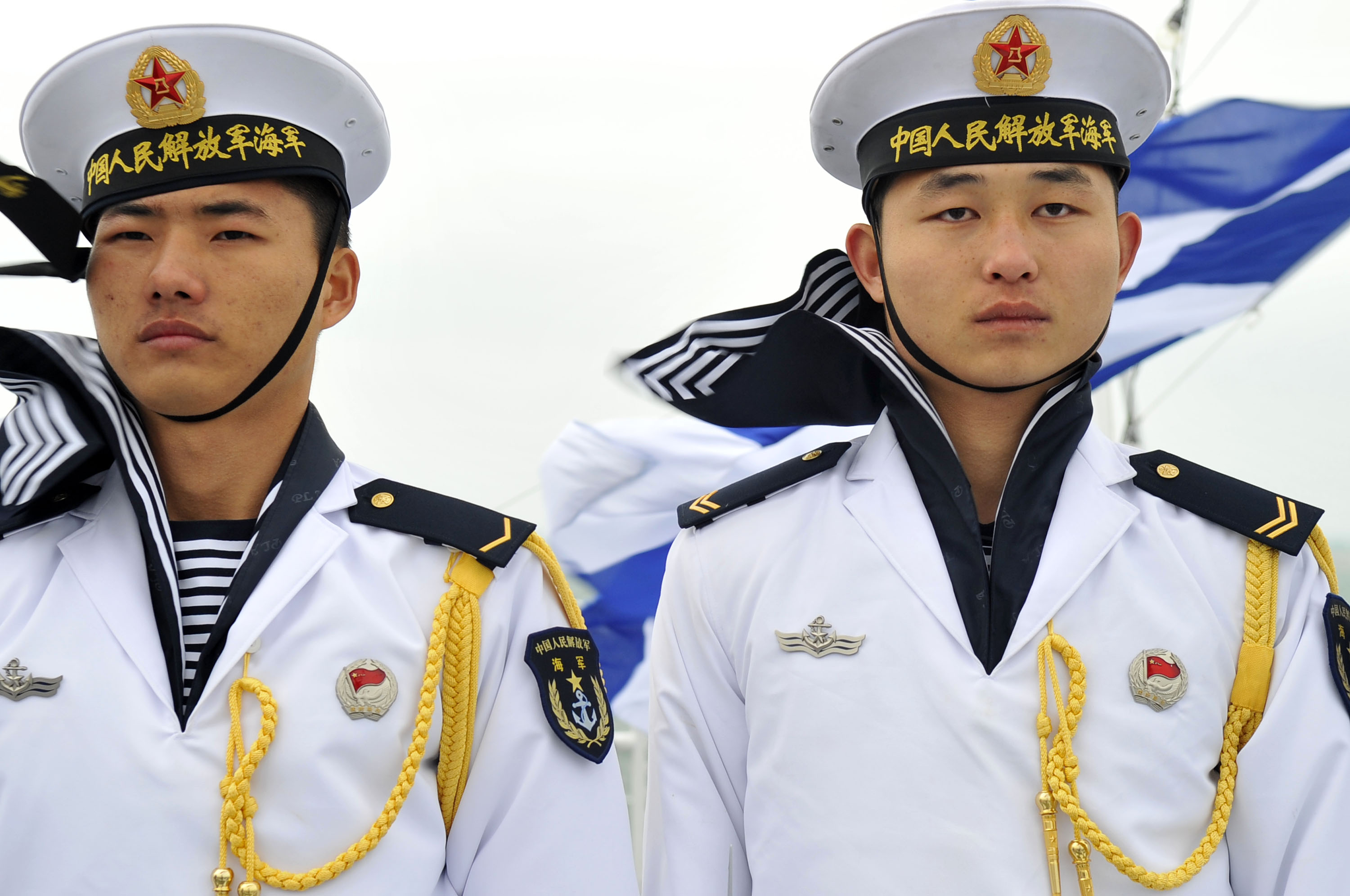
People's Liberation Army Navy sailors, 2009

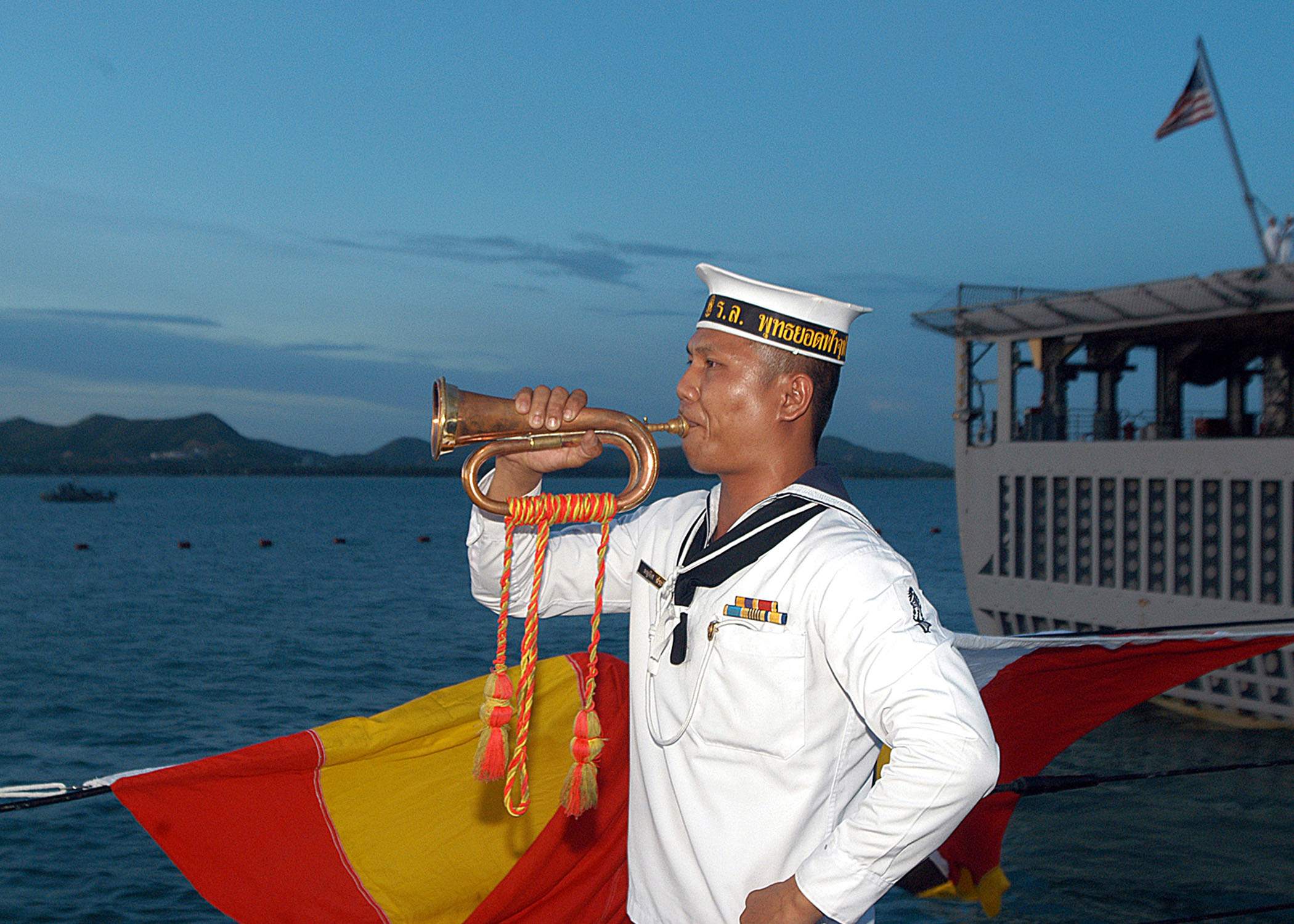
A Royal Thai Navy bugler, 2005

== As children's clothing ==
In 1846, the four-year-old Albert Edward, Prince of Wales was given a scaled-down version of the uniform worn by ratings on the Royal Yacht. Popular engravings, including the famous portrait done by Winterhalter, spread the idea, and by the 1870s the sailor suit had become a fashionable dress for both boys and girls in many countries. Some American cartoon and comic characters use a sailor suit as their trademarks; examples include Popeye, Donald Duck, and Fiddler Pig. Sailor suits have been worn by the members of the Vienna Boys' Choir on their international tours.

A female version of the sailor suit, the sailor dress, was popularly known in early 20th century America as a Peter Thomson dress after a naval tailor with outlets in New York and Philadelphia.

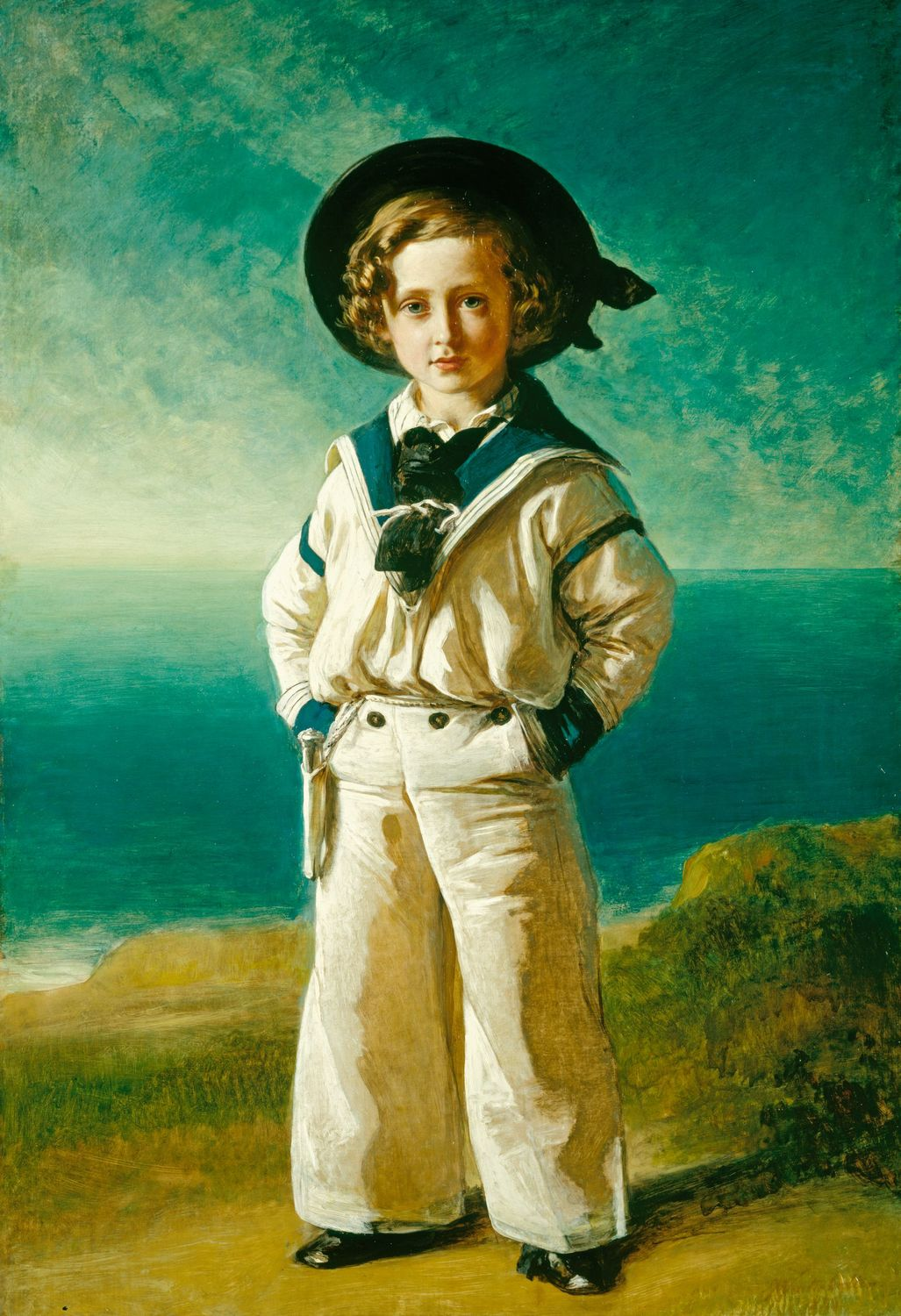
Prince Albert Edward (the future Edward VII of the United Kingdom) in a sailor suit. Portrait of Edward, Prince of Wales by Franz Xaver Winterhalter, 1846

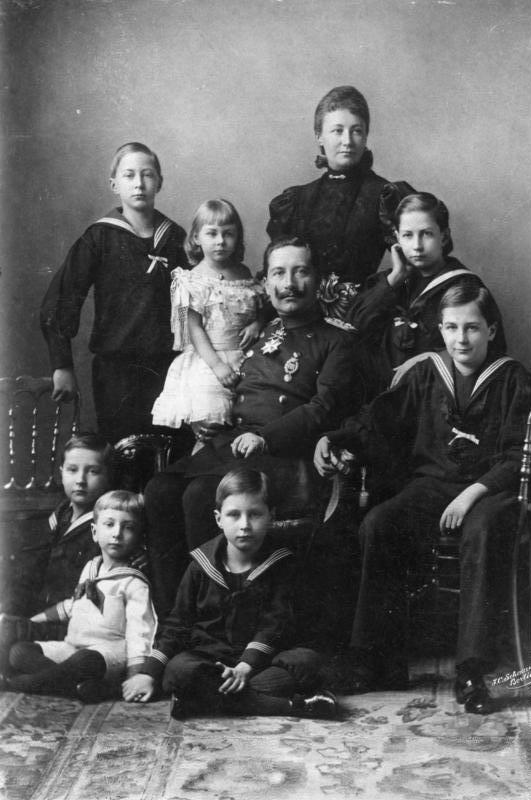
Family of Kaiser Wilhelm II in 1896

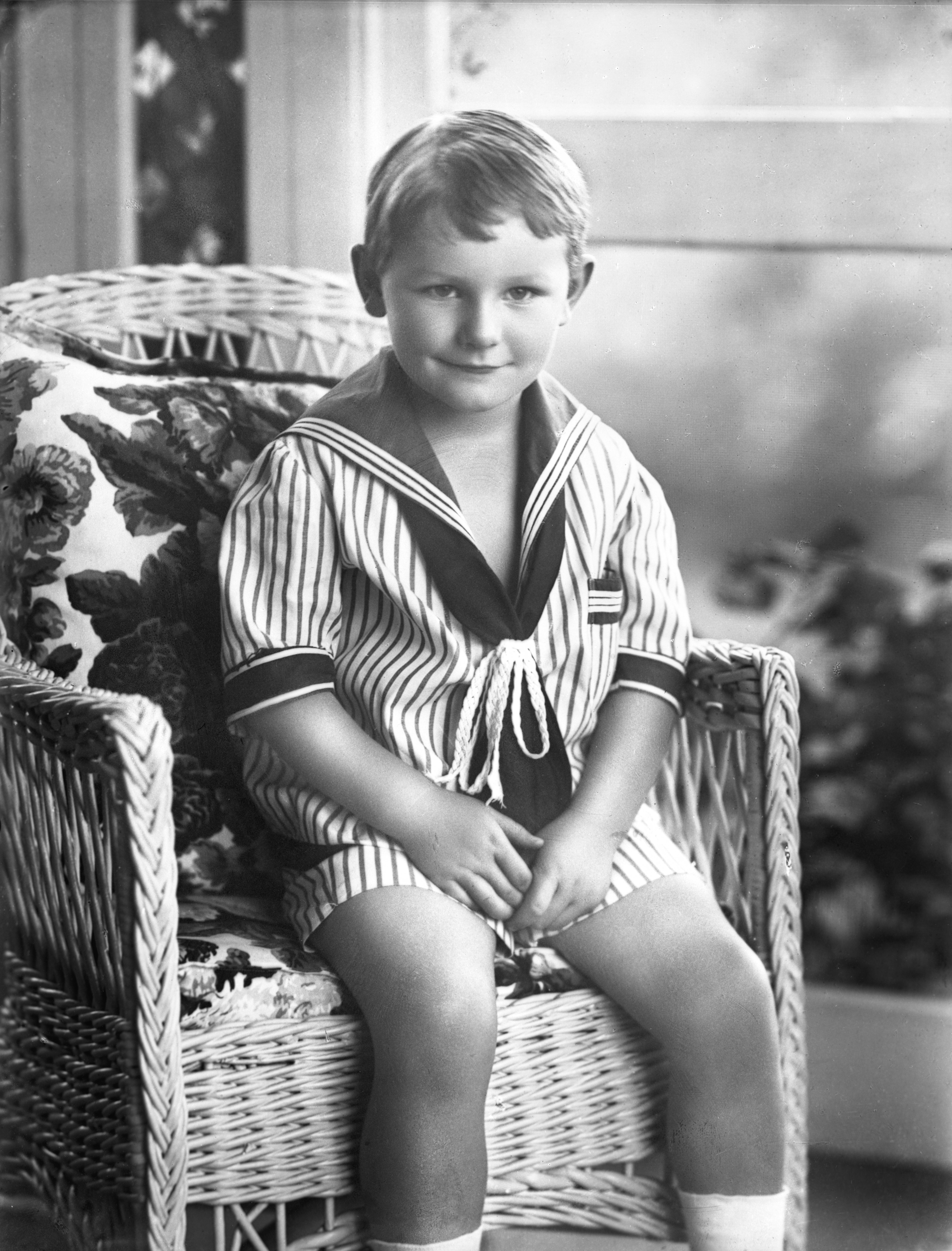
An American boy, 1913

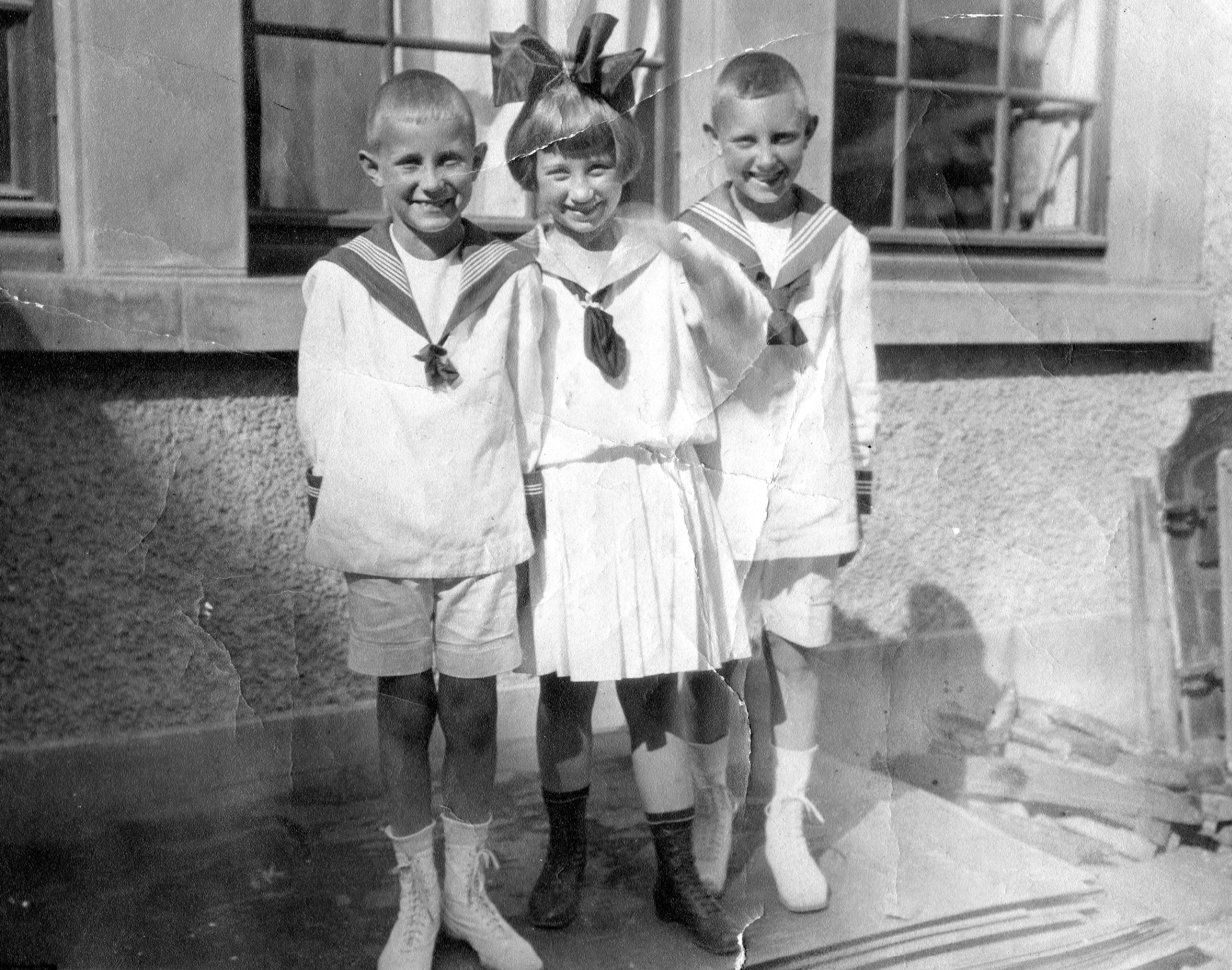
Children in Hungary, 1931

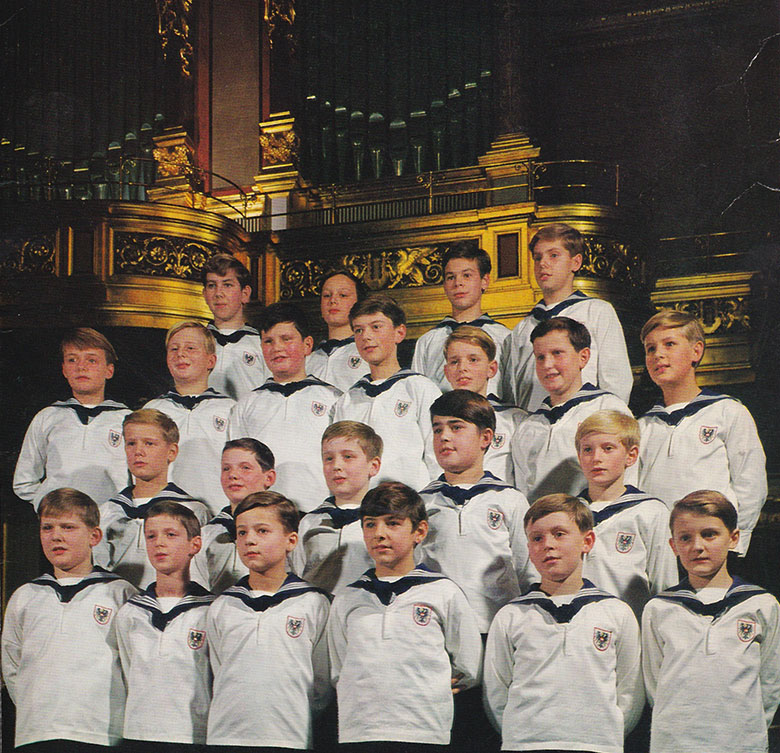
Choristers of the Vienna Boys' Choir in 1970

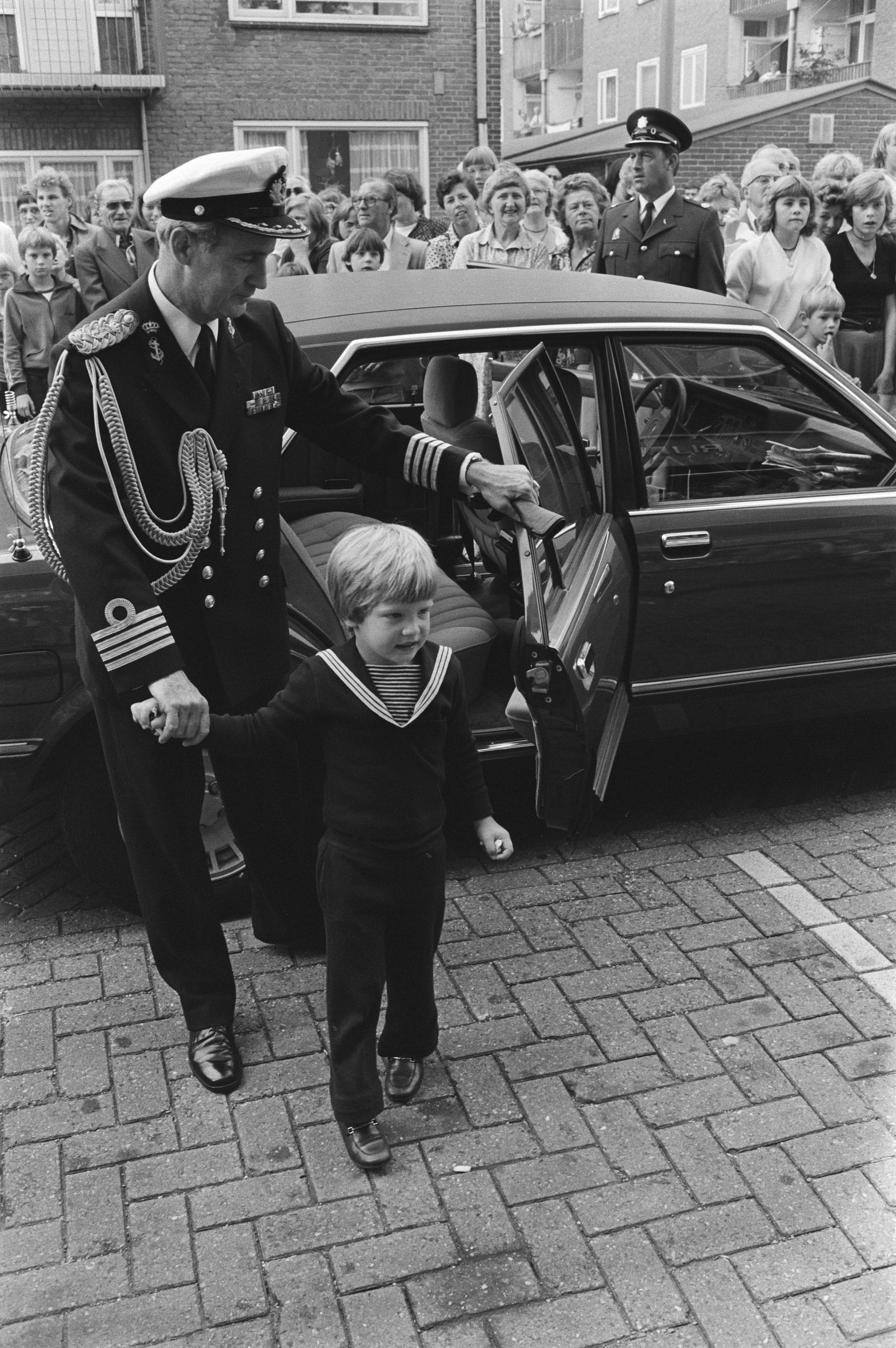
Prins Floris in the Netherlands, 1979

== Asian school uniforms ==
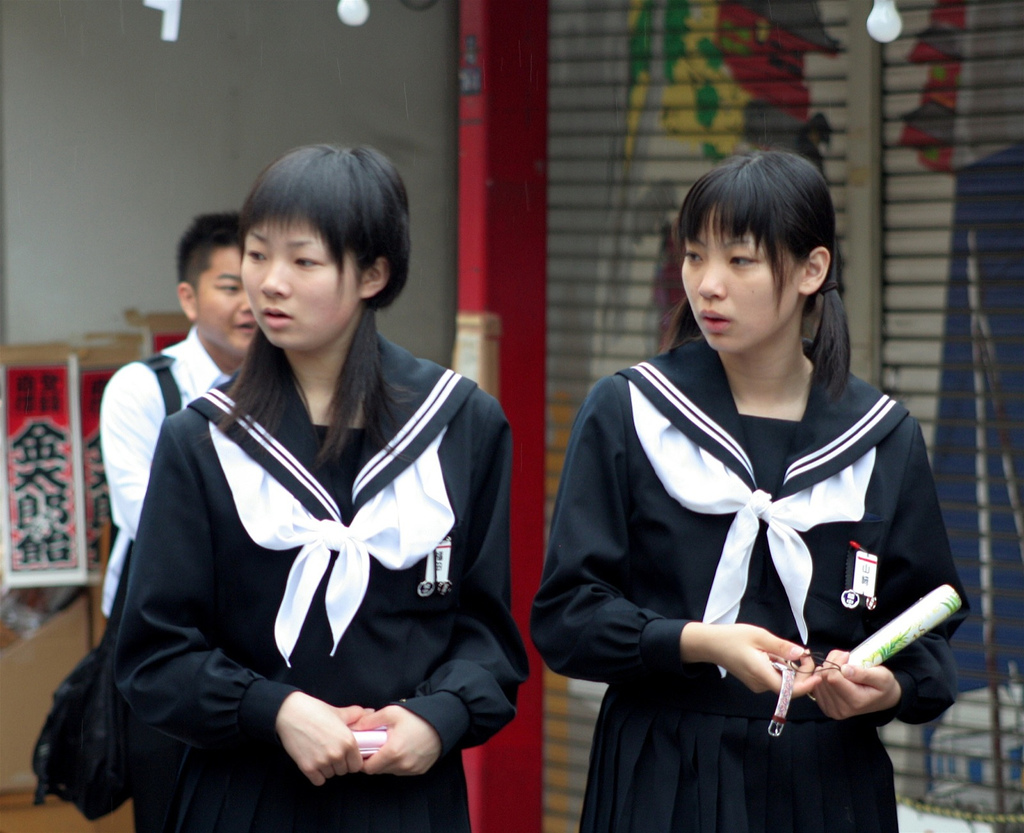
Japanese schoolgirls in sailor fuku uniforms, 2006

Many schools in some Asian countries and regions, including Japan, the Philippines, North Korea, South Korea, Vietnam, and Thailand, have adopted sailor outfits as a school uniform.

=== Japan ===
Sailor suits are especially common in Japanese girls' schools, known as sailor fuku by the Japanese. They are so common that the image of the outfit has evolved to be strongly associated with youth and female adolescence in popular culture. As a result, sailor uniforms are seen very frequently in Japanese dramas, movies, anime, manga, music videos and concert performances of pop teen idol groups.

=== Philippines ===
Just like in Japan, sailor uniforms are also common in Philippine schools, particularly in high schools. Most public schools adopted the sailor uniform as the official uniform for the girls and some of them adopted derivatives.

== See also ==
- Marinière
- Sailor dress
- Telnyashka
- Uniforms of the Royal Navy
- Uniforms of the United States Navy
