= Life Is Dead =

Japanese manga series and film

ライフ・イズ・デッド
- Manga
- Written by: Tomohiro Koizumi
- Published by: Futabasha
- Magazine: Manga Action
- Published: February 28, 2007 (tankōbon)
- Live-action film
- Directed by: Kōsuke Hishinuma
- Written by: Kōsuke Hishinuma
- Released: February 11, 2012
- Runtime: 93 minutes

Life Is Dead (ライフ・イズ・デッド) is a Japanese manga series by Tomohiro Koizumi. It was adapted into a live action film in 2012.

== Cast ==
- Atsushi Arai as Yukio Akaboshi
- Rino Higa as Shoko Akaboshi
- Ryousuke Kawamura as Atsushi Omoi
- Shintarō Akutsu as Yuuki Yashiro
- Ryō Shihono as Akane Aoki
- Airi Nakajima as Aoi Sakurai
- Takuya Nagaoka as Naoki Gotou
- Aya Enjouji as Meiko Akaboshi
- Susumu Kobayashi as Hiroshi Akaboshi

== Reception ==
In a list of "10 Great Zombie Manga", Anime News Network's Jason Thompson placed Life Is Dead in sixth place.
