= Sailor dress =

Women's (more usually girl's) dress with a sailor collar

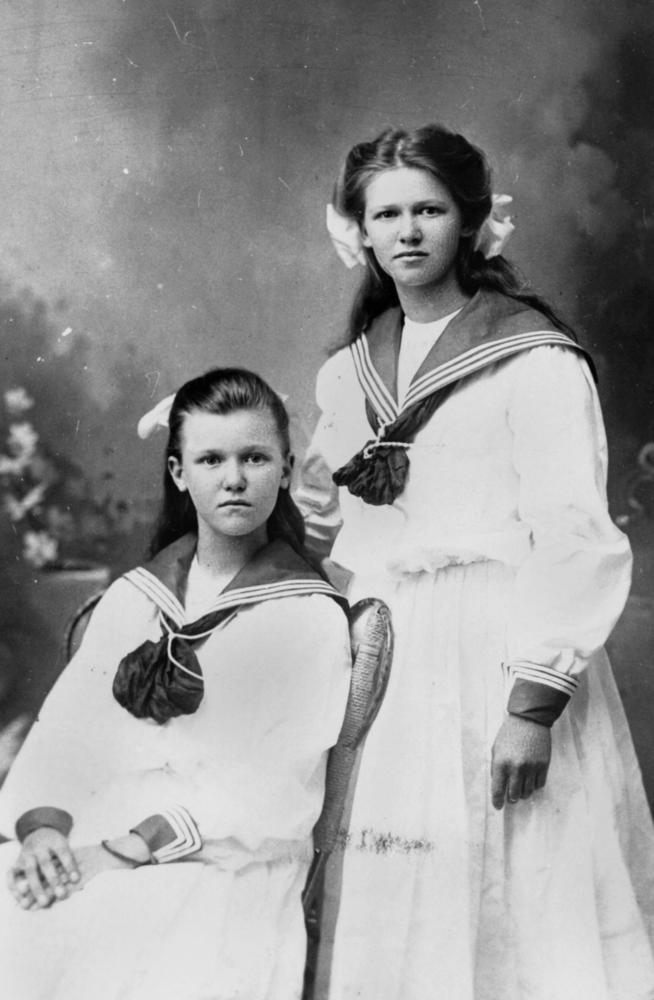
Ivy and Bertha Richardson of Townsville, ca. 1910

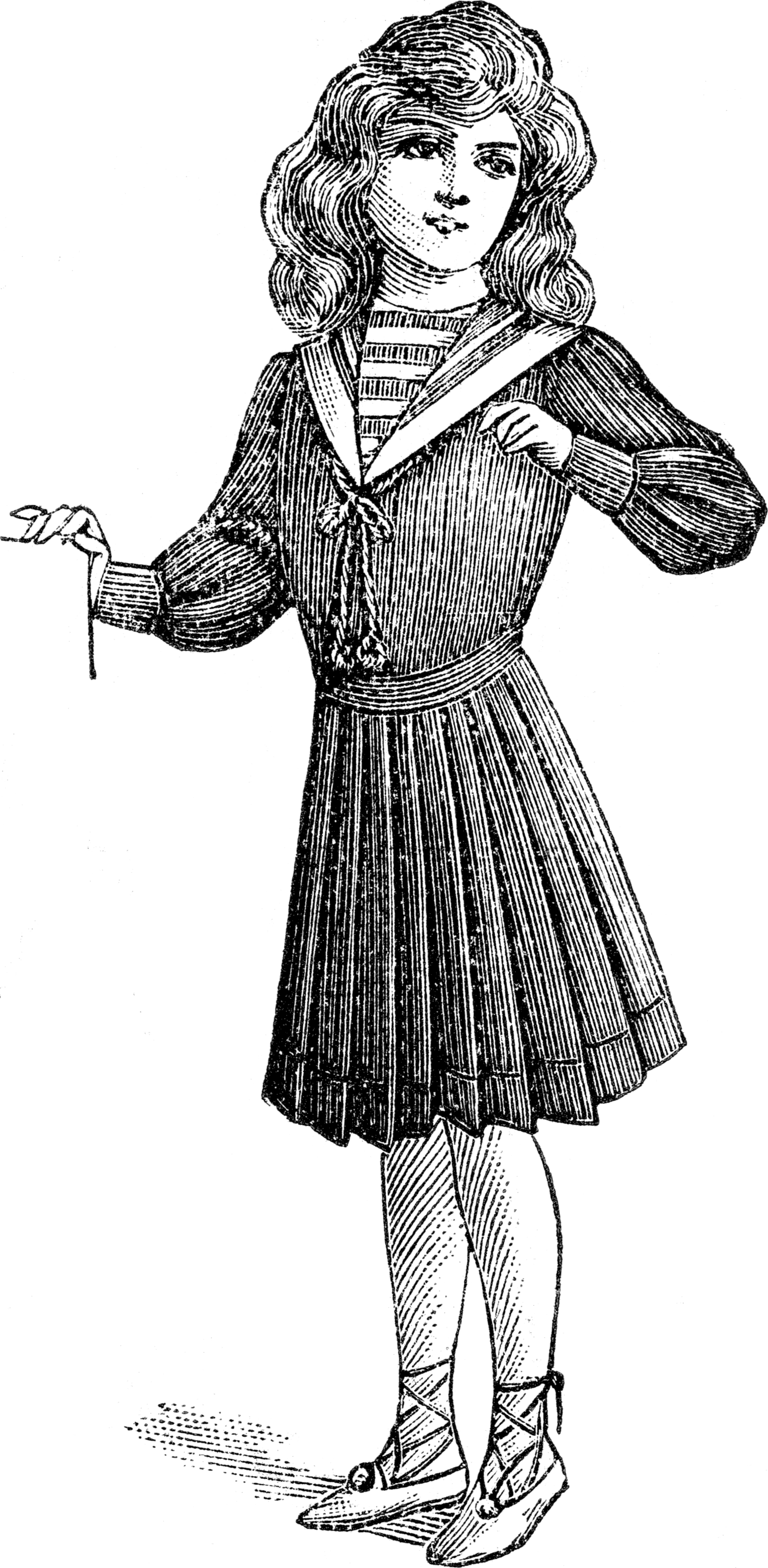
A young girl's sailor dress of the type called a 'Peter Thomson' in the United States. French, 1911–12

A sailor suit dress is a traditional English female civilian clothing piece that follows the styling of the male British Royal Navy's sailor suit (which also originated in England), particularly the bodice and collar treatment. A sailor-collared blouse is called a middy blouse ("middy" derives from "midshipman"). In early 20th-century America, sailor dresses were very popularly known as Peter Thomson dresses after the former naval tailor credited with creating the style.

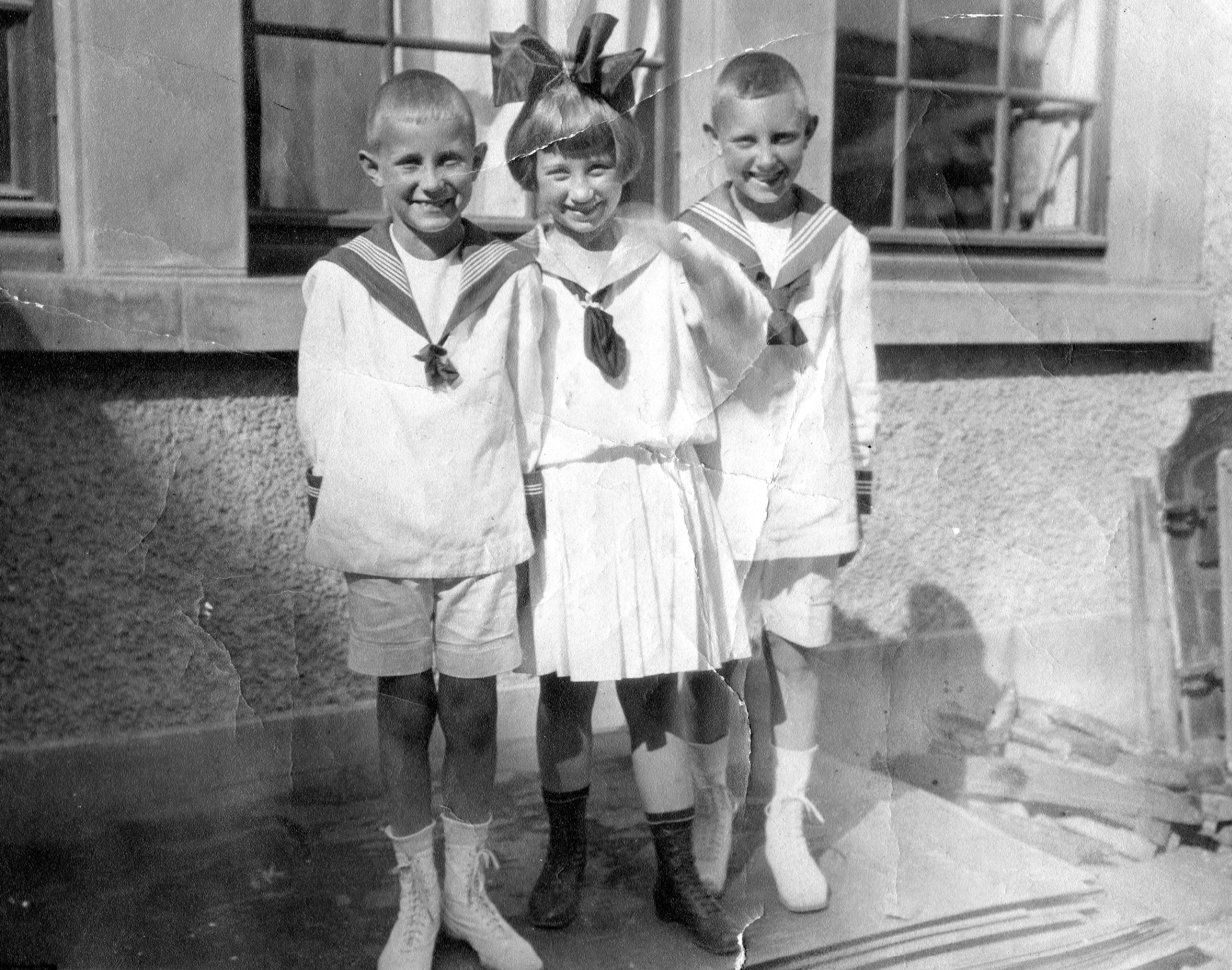
English children wearing sailor dress attire in the 1930s

== Peter Thomson dress ==
Peter Thomson (sometimes spelled Thompson) had tailoring establishments in New York and Philadelphia in around 1900. His original sailor dresses and suits, for both women and children (including young boys), are represented in several American museum collections including the Metropolitan Museum's Costume Institute, and the Philadelphia Museum of Art. The 'Peter Thomson dress' was made from cotton or linen for summer wear, or wool in winter. It was promoted as an ideal costume or uniform for female students and schoolchildren, and was popular with those trying to establish a "standardized style" of clothing. By 1919, the Peter Thomson dress was regarded as a valid option for school uniforms, and was described as synonymous with "good taste for girls of 14-18 years old for many years." Peter Thomson styling was also applied to the bodices of early bathing costumes.

Dresses with sailor styling were known before the Peter Thomson design took hold. In Sweden in 1887, a sailor dress with natural waist and pleated skirt was among the designs promoted by the dress reform movement as appropriate for young girls.

== Late 20th century and early 21st century ==
Although sailor styling is sometimes seen on women's dresses, since the mid-20th century it is mainly associated with dresses for babies and small children. During the late 20th century, sailor styling became associated with maternity dresses, which has led to some negativity towards sailor styles for womenswear and the general idea of a woman dressing 'like a child'. The maternity clothing designer Liz Lange declared, "She shouldn't have to dress like a child just because she's having a child; it's one thing to put a toddler in a sailor suit but it's another thing completely to condemn a grown woman to such a fate."

== See also ==
- Japanese school uniform
- Sailor hat
