= Rino Higa =

Japanese actress and talent from Okinawa (born 1992)

- ヒガリノ
- Born: May 11, 1992 (age 34); Okinawa, Japan
- Years active: 2009-current

Rino Higa (ヒガ リノ, Higa Rino; born May 11, 1992 in Okinawa) is a Japanese gravure idol, television and film actress, singer and voice actress. She debuted in 2009 and is affiliated with Sony Music Artists, which distributes and sells her records.

== Filmography ==
=== Television ===
- Bitworld (ビットワールド) - Urara (Pinky Macaron: Emerald Destiny)

=== Films ===
Year	Film title	Role	Notes
2011	A Yell from Heaven	Miki	Credited as: "Higarino".
2011	Schoolgirl Apocalypse	Sakura Ishizuka	Credited as: "Higarino".
2012	Life Is Dead	Shoko Akaboshi	Based on a Manga series.
2013	Himawari - Okinawa wa Wasurenai, Ano Nichi no Sora o -	Unknown role	Credited as: "Higarino".
2014	Bon to Linchan	Miyu Sato	

== Discography ==
=== Radio ===
- Gekidan Samba Carnival
