= Heian Jogakuin University =

Private women's college in Japan

Coordinates: 35°1′10.76″N 135°45′29.99″E

- 平安女学院大学
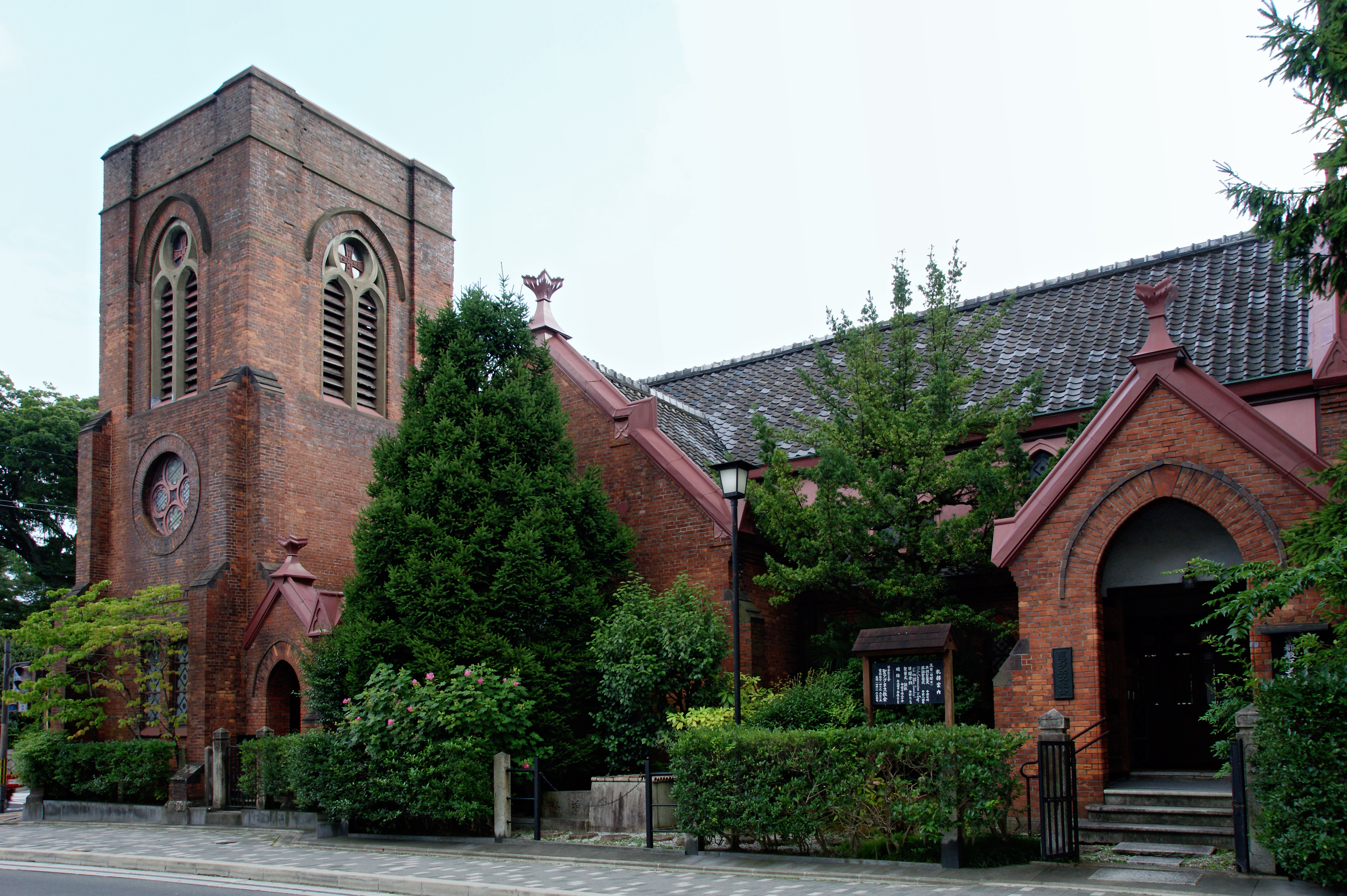
- Type: Private
- Established: Founded 1875, Chartered 1950
- President: Keiichiro Yamaoka-Ceo
- Location: Kyoto City, Kyoto Prefecture, Japan
- Campus: Kyoto City and Takatsuki City
- Website: www.heian.ac.jp

Heian Jogakuin University (平安女学院大学, Heian jogakuin daigaku) also known at St. Agnes' University, is a private women's college with campuses in Kyoto, Kyoto and Takatsuki, Osaka in Japan.

The university's foundation history can be traced through the establishment of St. Agnes' School to 1875. The university received its official charter as an accredited four year university in 2000. The university is an affiliated educational institution of the Nippon Sei Ko Kai, the province of the Anglican Communion in Japan.

It is scheduled to become coeducational in 2028.

== See also ==
- Anglican Church in Japan
- Channing Moore Williams
