= Catholic school uniform =

Type of school dress code

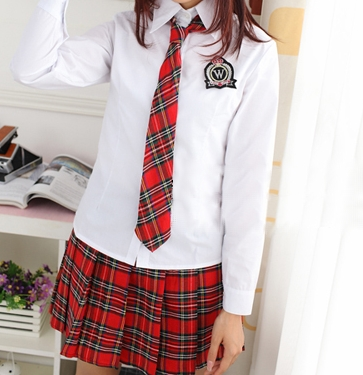
A girl wearing a Catholic school uniform

A Catholic school uniform in North America typically consists of a pleated and tartan skirt or jumper dress (a sleeveless dress), Mary Jane or saddle shoes, a button-up shirt, and a sweater for girls, while boys' uniforms consist of a button-up shirt, a necktie, and dark trousers pants. Actual school uniforms vary widely by location and individual school.

In contrast to most schools in the United States, almost all Catholic schools in that country have some form of dress code, and most of them (especially those with students in the lower grade levels) have a mandatory uniform policy.

In most Commonwealth countries, Hong Kong, Macao, Japan, South Korea, Taiwan, Thailand — school uniforms (often akin to the "Catholic school uniform" type in the United States) are common in all types of schools, regardless of religious denomination or secularity (irreligiosity).

In most schools in Latin America and the Philippines, school uniforms are common and their design is often very similar to the Catholic school uniform type from the United States.

== Purpose of school uniforms ==
The stated purpose of uniforms, often set forth in school uniform policies, include reducing clothing expenditures for parents as well as avoiding distinctions among children based on whose parents can afford to buy them fashionable clothing to wear to school. The school attire is also said to reduce distractions and help with student identification, ensuring that a stranger will stand out among the uniformed students. Another stated reason for the use of school uniforms is to instill school pride and promote an atmosphere of the school as a working environment.

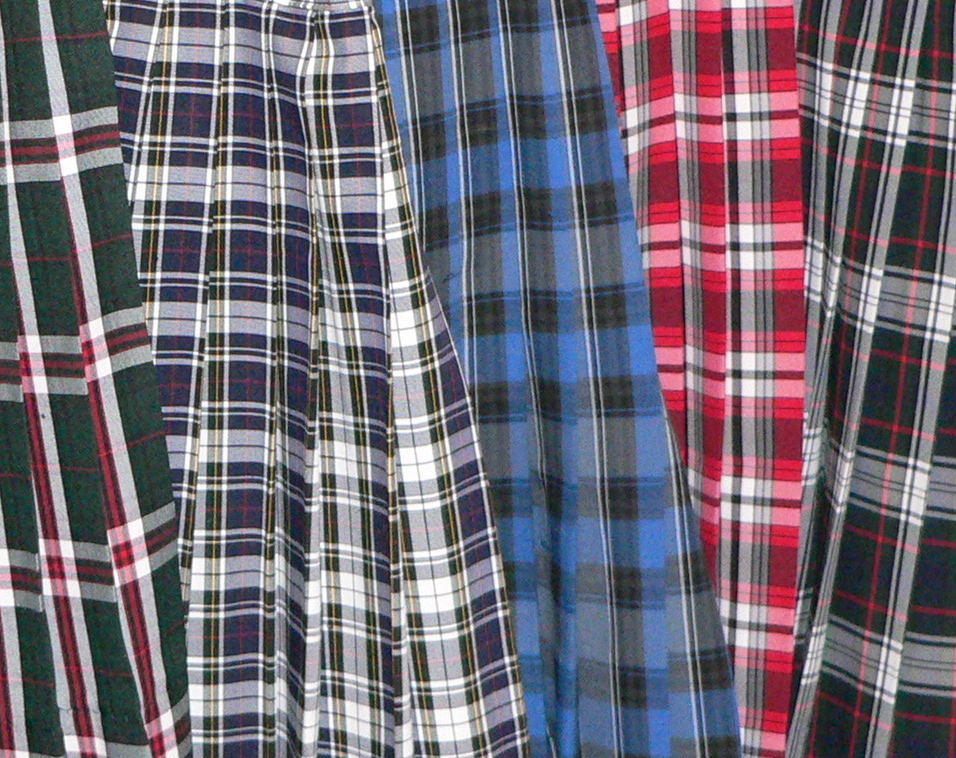
Several examples of Catholic school uniform skirts showing the tartan patterns.

== In North America ==
Until the early to mid-1970s, the uniform for girls almost always consisted of a skirt or jumper dress; but it is now common, in the United States, for female pupils to wear uniform shorts or slacks, depending on the weather. This is mainly the result of changing societal norms that, beginning in the late 1960s to early 1970s, resulted in a trend for women and girls in most levels of society to wear trousers and shorts, instead of skirts and dresses, for everyday life. Today, most schools require girls to wear skirts, while others allow girls the choice of skirts, dress or culottes and pants including ankle pants that stop at or just a little above the ankle and twill jogger pants.

A kilted skirt is sometimes worn, especially in schools with predominantly Celtic student populations. In some parts of Canada, the skirt has been modified to include an attached pair of shorts beneath, for modesty called a skort. Bike shorts or leggings are often worn under girls' skirts or jumper dresses for modesty and to prevent individuals from looking under the girl's skirt or dress. The leggings can be ankle-length or capri-length with crew or knee-high socks worn over the ankle leggings. Culottes or ankle pants that stop at or just above the ankle are also sometimes substituted for a skirt, especially at non-parochial private schools; however, for special events, the skirt is usually still worn. Also knee socks or tights are two other commonly worn items with the skirt.

Students in preschool and, less frequently, kindergarten, are held to be more likely to engage in messy activities. As such, they may be asked to wear their school's physical education uniform as their regular uniform. Younger girls are often seen wearing jumper dresses in tartan (often called "plaid" in America) over a blouse under their skirts. Many schools require a jumper dress up to the fourth, fifth, or sixth grade, presumably because the lifestyles and habits of younger girls may make blouses more likely to become untucked from skirt or culotte waistbands. They are often worn with tights or knee socks and flats, Sperrys, or sometimes dressy sneakers. After that, the jumper dress is often discarded in favor of a tartan skirt with bike shorts, capri or ankle length leggings, with crew or knee socks over the ankle leggings, tights, knee socks or culottes and blouse or polo depending on the weather and season. Often the skirt and blouse or polo must be worn with a sweater (what "jumper" means in British and other Commonwealth English) or sweater vest, or the polo is worn by itself or with a layering long-sleeved tee underneath or with the polo worn underneath a sweater or sweatshirt with the polo collar turned over the sweater or sweatshirt collar so it's visible. Usually flats, or Sperrys, and sometimes other dressy shoes are worn.

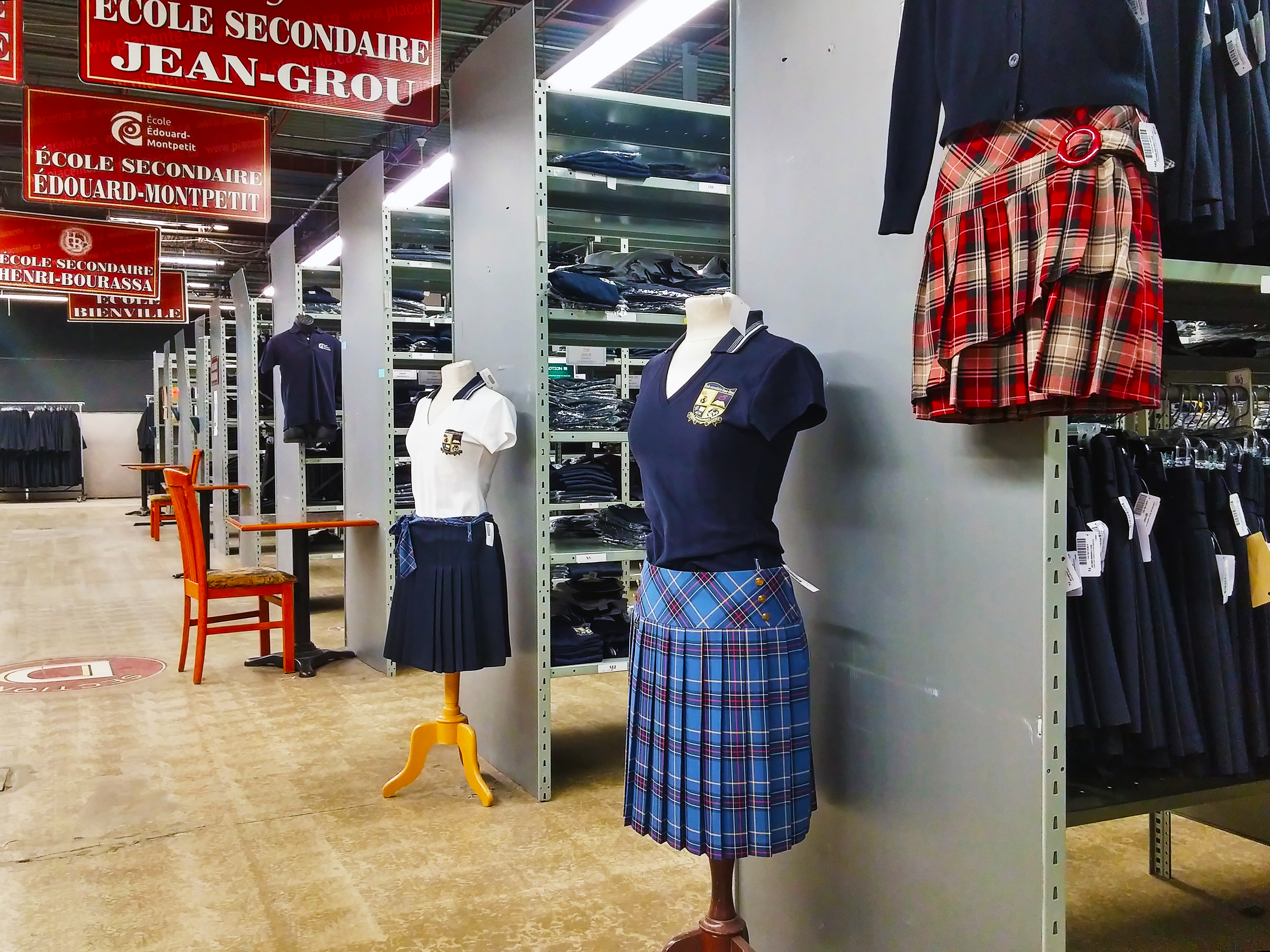
High school uniforms on display at a warehouse store in Canada

Boys typically wear a collared shirt and tie or polo shirt, and slacks of required colors. Twill jogger pants are becoming a comfortable but still appropriate uniform pants choice worn by boys. Polo shirts have to some extent replaced dress shirt. In the winter colder months the polo is seen worn with a layered long-sleeved tee underneath or a sweatshirt or sweater over the polo with the collar of the polo folded over the collar of the sweatshirt or sweater so it's visible. Many times in warmer weather dress shorts can be worn usually with crew or knee length socks with ankle socks allowed in some schools. Usually Sperrys or sometimes other dressy shoes or occasionally sneakers are worn.

Both sexes usually wear a sweater or blazer (or both) or polo with a layered long-sleeved tee underneath or a sweatshirt or sweater over the polo with the collar of the polo folded over the collar of the sweatshirt or sweater so the polo collar is visible when required by regulations or weather.

Some schools have unisex uniforms—most often a distinctive shirt, and sometimes pants of a given color. They may also require that a specially designated, more formal uniform be worn on liturgy days or other special occasions.

Uniforms may vary based on time of year. At many schools, students are excused from having to wear the fairly formal (and warm) uniforms described above during the hotter months of the school year in favor of lighter uniform clothing such as skorts, skirts, or shorts worn with knee socks, crew socks, quarter socks, or triple roll socks, or capri leggings under the skirt. Capri pants are also allowed in some schools. However, at some schools appearance and formality prevail over comfort and students must suffer through the warm weather in their full uniform, which can include long-sleeved dress shirts, ties, wool sweaters, blazers, wool skirts, jumper dresses, leggings, and tights.

In many schools, flats for girls and Sperrys for both girls and boys have become popular and acceptable footwear with the uniforms.

Scrunchies, headbands, or headwrap-style headbands are usually worn in school colors and patterns.

== In popular culture ==
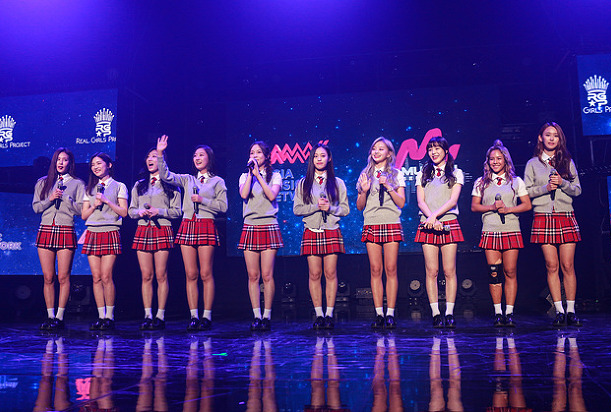
A K-pop all-girls band group wearing modified Catholic school uniform during a performance, 2017.

The Russian pop duo t.A.T.u. also wore clothing resembling Catholic school uniforms in a video for their song "Ya Soshla S Uma" (also known by the title of its English-language version, "All the Things She Said").

== See also ==
- Catholic school
- Gymslip tunics
