= Prince Antônio Gastão of Orléans-Braganza =

Brazilian prince

Antônio Gastão
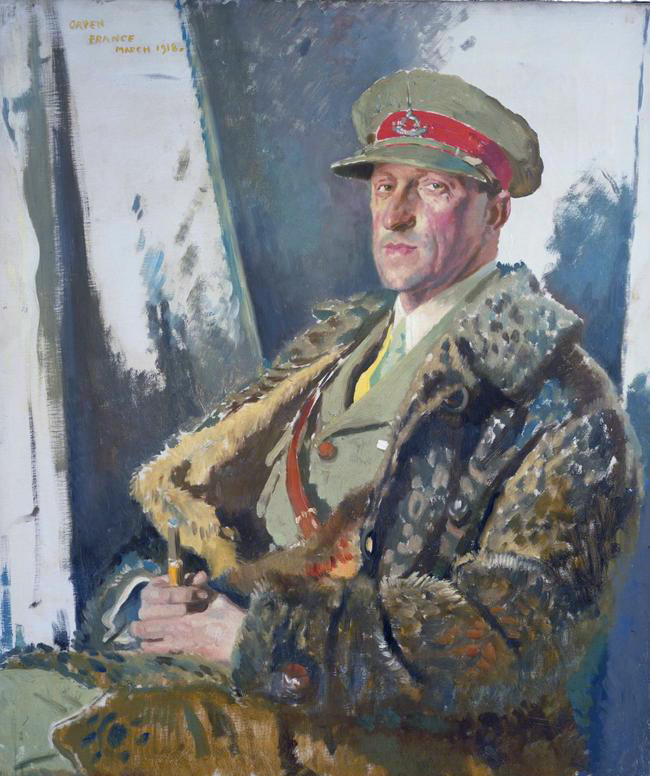
- Antônio Gastão in 1918
- Born: 9 August 1881; Paris, France
- Died: 29 November 1918 (aged 37); Edmonton, London, England
- Burial: Royal Chapel, Dreux, France
Names
- Prince Antônio Gastão Filipe Francisco de Assis Maria Miguel Gabriel Rafael Gonzaga de Orléans e Bragança
- House: House of Orléans-Braganza
- Father: Prince Gaston, Count of Eu
- Mother: Isabel, Princess Imperial of Brazil

Captain Prince Antônio Gastão of Orléans-Braganza MC (Portuguese: Antônio Gastão de Orléans e Bragança; 9 August 1881 – 29 November 1918) was a Brazilian-born prince of the House of Orléans-Braganza and a military officer who served with distinction in the forces of the British Empire during World War I.

A member of the former Brazilian imperial family, Prince Antônio Gastão volunteered for service with the British Army during the war and rose to the rank of captain. He was awarded the Military Cross for gallantry in action, becoming one of the few members of a deposed royal house to receive a British military decoration during the conflict.

== Life ==
Antônio was born in Paris, the third and last son of Isabel, Princess Imperial of Brazil, and her husband Gaston of Orléans, Count of Eu. His father was a grandson of the last king of France, Louis Philippe I, and his mother was the eldest daughter and heiress of Emperor Pedro II of Brazil. He was baptised on 27 August 1881. His full name was Antônio Gastão Luiz Filipe Francisco de Assis Maria Miguel Rafael Gabriel Gonzaga; his family affectionately called him "Totó".

After his grandfather was deposed in a military coup in Brazil, he and his family were sent into exile in Europe. As a child he was chronically sick with bronchitis. He was educated in Paris, and at the Theresian Military Academy in Wiener Neustadt, Austria. After graduation, he was a Hussar lieutenant in the Austro-Hungarian Army between 1908 and 1914.

When World War I broke out, Antônio was prevented from joining the French armed forces by a law that forbade members of the deposed French royal family from serving in the military. Instead, he was commissioned as a lieutenant in the Royal Canadian Dragoons where he served attached to the Royal Flying Corps as intelligence officer. He was promoted to captain in 1916, and was awarded the Military Cross in 1917. He was aide-de-camp to the commander of the Canadian Cavalry Brigade, Brigadier-General Seely, from February 1917 until May 1918, and then was seconded for duty with the War Office in July.

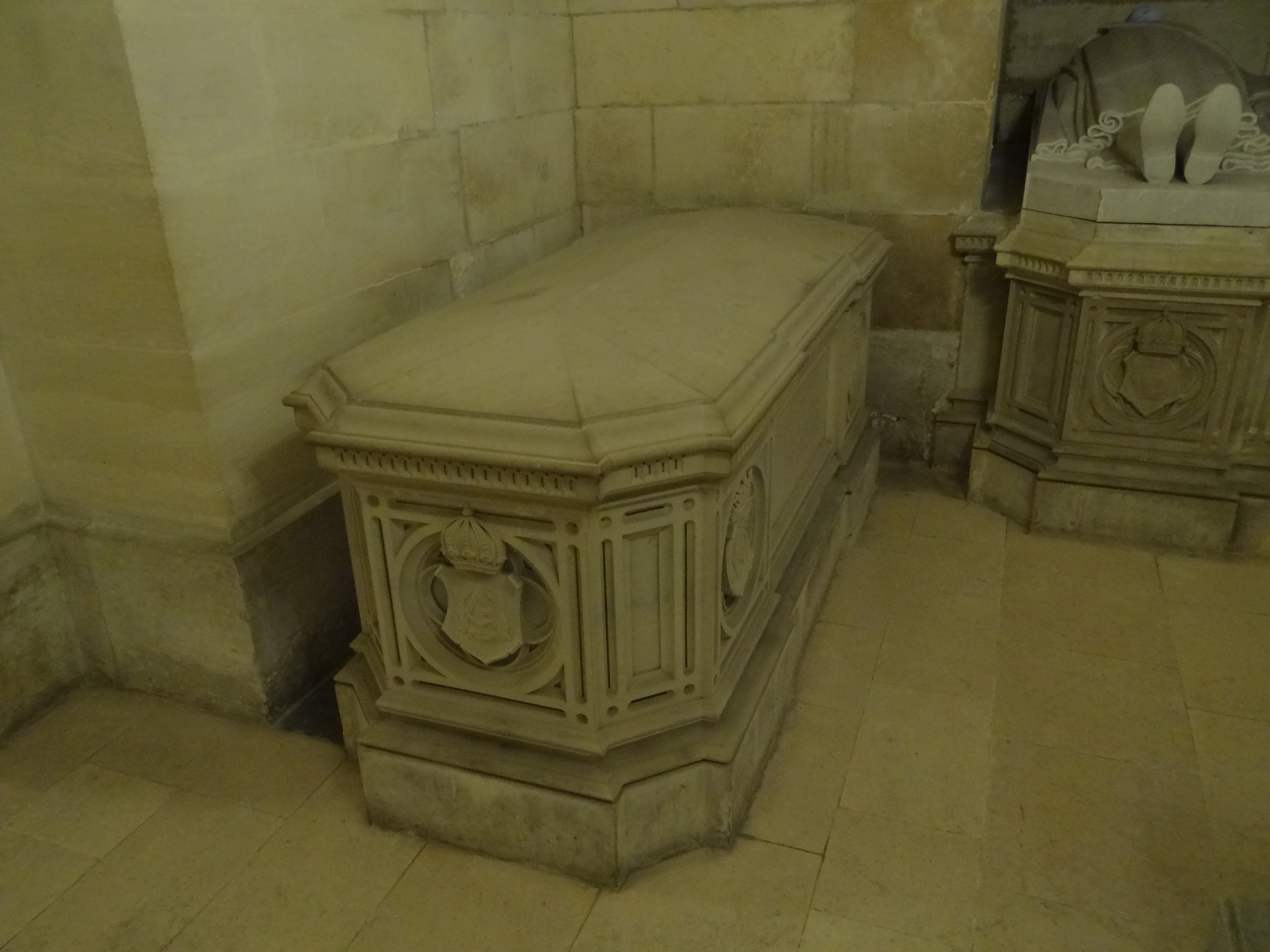
Tomb of Prince Antônio in the Royal Chapel of Dreux

Antônio died from injuries sustained in an air crash at Edmonton, London, shortly after the end of the war. His remains were placed in the Royal Chapel of Dreux, in France.

== Honors ==
- (Empire of Brazil) Knight Grand Cross of the Order of Pedro I
- (Empire of Brazil) Knight Grand Cross of the Order of the Rose
- (Kingdom of Portugal) Knight Grand Cross of the Order of Christ
- (Spain) Knight Grand Cross of the Order of Charles III
- (Bulgaria) Knight Grand Cross of the Order of Merit
- (Empire of Japan) Knight Grand Cross of the Order of the Rising Sun
- Knight of the Legion of Honour of France

== Ancestry ==
Ancestors of Prince Antônio Gastão of Orléans-Braganza

8. Louis Philippe I of France
4. Prince Louis, Duke of Nemours
9. Princess Maria Amalia of Naples and Sicily
2. Prince Gaston, Count of Eu
10. Prince Ferdinand of Saxe-Coburg and Gotha
5. Princess Victoria of Saxe-Coburg and Gotha
11. Princess Maria Antonia Koháry of Csábrág and Szitnya
1. Prince Antônio Gastão of Orléans-Braganza
12. Pedro I of Brazil and IV of Portugal
6. Pedro II of Brazil
13. Archduchess Maria Leopoldina of Austria
3. Isabel, Princess Imperial of Brazil
14. Francis I of the Two Sicilies
7. Princess Teresa Cristina of the Two Sicilies
15. Infanta Maria Isabella of Spain
