= Cousin =

Child of a parent's sibling

A cousin is a relative who is the child of a parent's sibling; this is more specifically referred to as a first cousin. A parent of a first cousin is an aunt or uncle.

More generally, in the kinship system used in the English-speaking world, cousins are in a type of relationship in which the two cousins are two or more generations away from their most recent common ancestor. In this usage, "degrees" and "removals" are used to specify the relationship more precisely.

"Degree" (such as "first cousin", "second cousin", etc.) measures how distant the relationship is from the most recent common ancestor(s), starting with one for first cousins and increasing with every subsequent generation.

If the cousins do not come from the same generation, "removal" expresses the difference in generations between the two cousins. When removal is not specified, no removal is assumed.

Because the single term "cousin" in English includes both degrees and removals, any given individual can have far more cousins among their living relatives than is possible for any other familial relationship. For some individuals, genealogists can track hundreds of cousin relationships back across centuries.

Various government entities have established systems for legal use that can precisely specify kinship with common ancestors any number of generations in the past; for example, in medicine and law, a first cousin is a type of third-degree relative.

== Basic definitions ==
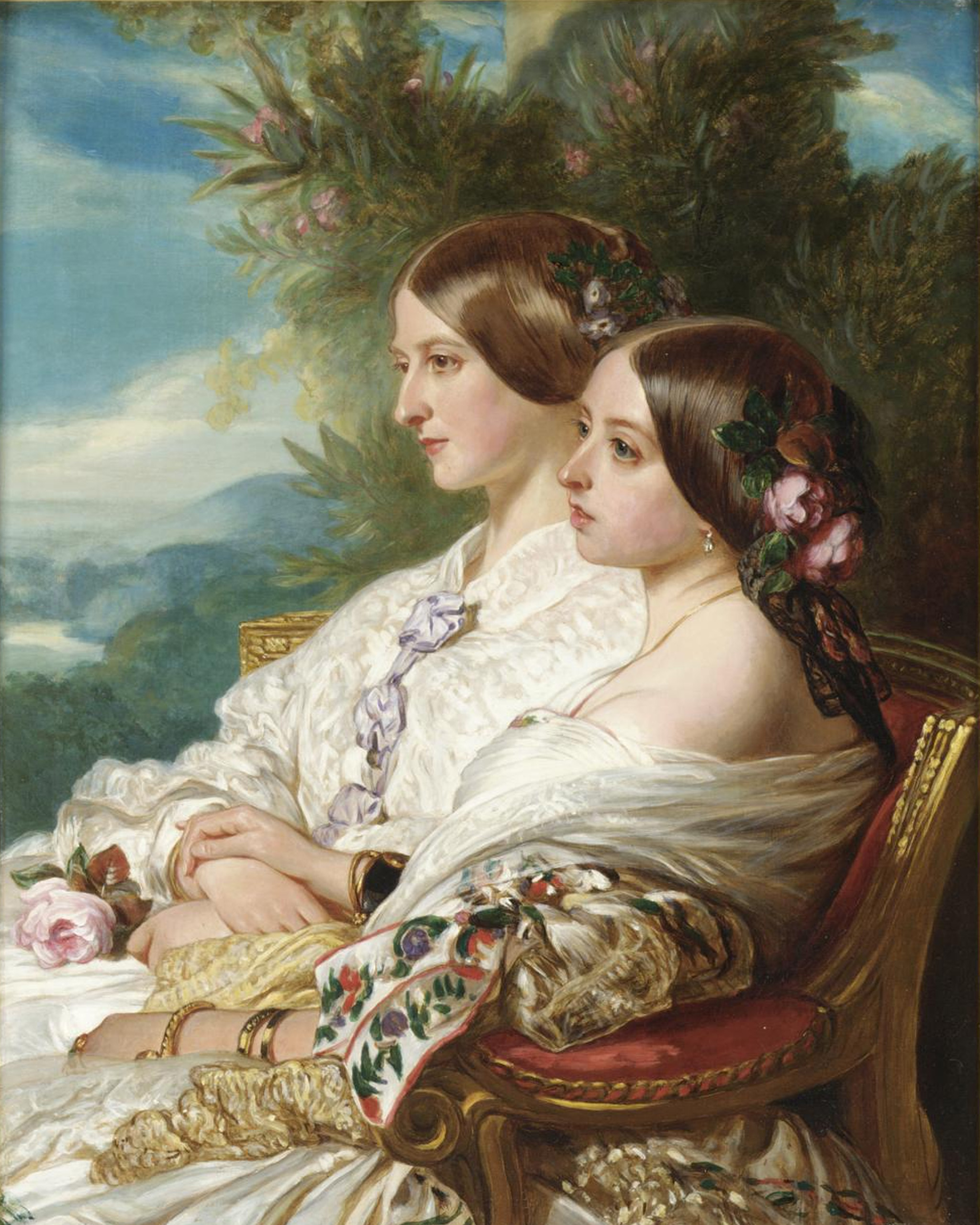
The Cousins by Franz Xaver Winterhalter, 1852. Queen Victoria and her cousin Princess Victoria, Duchess of Nemours.

People are related with a type of cousin relationship if they share a common ancestor, and are separated from their most recent common ancestor by two or more generations. This means neither person is an ancestor of the other, they do not share a parent (are not siblings), and neither is a sibling of the other's parent (are not the other's aunt/uncle nor niece/nephew). In the English system the cousin relationship is further detailed by the concepts of degree and removal.

The degree is the number of generations subsequent to the common ancestor before a parent of one of the cousins is found. This means the degree is the separation of the cousin from the common ancestor less one. Also, if the cousins are not separated from the common ancestor by the same number of generations, the cousin with the smallest separation is used to determine the degree. The removal is the difference between the number of generations from each cousin to the common ancestor. Two people can be removed but be around the same age due to differences in birth dates of parents, children, and other relevant ancestors.

Basic family tree

Joseph	Edwina	Order
1st
Paul	Marie	Charles	Claudette	2nd
3rd
Daisy	David	Emma	Edward
Felicity	Frank	George	Gwen
Harry	Clara

- The relationship between every solid shaded box and a similar one on the other branch of the tree is that of a cousin.
- The removal is the number of rows by which the relatives are separated.
- The degree of the relationship is that of the relative with the lowest order.
- The rules are the same for cousins-in-law, except they exist between shaded solid lines and shaded dotted lines.

For example, David and George are on opposing sides of the family tree and are first cousins (David is of the lower order: one) with one removal (the cousins are of order one and two respectively; therefore, the difference in generations to the common ancestor is one).

== Additional terms ==
- The terms full cousin and cousin-german are used to specify a first cousin with no removals.
- The terms cousin-uncle/aunt and cousin-niece/nephew are sometimes used to describe the direction of the removal of the relationship, including in Mennonite families. Adding uncle/aunt refers to an older generation while niece/nephew refers to younger ones. Another approach is to use the terms up and down to indicate direction of removal. For example, in the Basic family tree above, George is a cousin-nephew of David, or a first cousin once removed down. David is George's cousin-uncle, or cousin once-removed up. For additional removals, grand/great are applied to these relationships. Thus, David is a cousin-granduncle from Clara's perspective, or a cousin twice removed that comes from an older generation, also known as a cousin twice removed up. Similarly, Clara is a cousin-grandniece, or a female first cousin twice removed down, to David.
- The term grandcousin is sometimes used for the grandchild of a first cousin, or the first cousin of a grandparent: a first cousin twice removed.
- The term kissing cousin is sometimes used for a distant relative who is familiar enough to be greeted with a kiss.

=== Gender-based distinctions ===
A maternal cousin is a cousin that is related to the mother's side of the family, while a paternal cousin is a cousin that is related to the father's side of the family. This relationship is not necessarily reciprocal, as the maternal cousin of one person could be the paternal cousin of the other.

Parallel and cross cousins are reciprocal relationships. Parallel cousins are descended from same-sex siblings. A parallel first cousin relationship exists when both the subject and relative are maternal cousins, or both are paternal cousins. Cross cousins are descendants from opposite-sex siblings. A cross first cousin relationship exists when the subject and the relative are maternal cousin and paternal cousin to each other.

=== Multiplicities ===
Otto	Louise
Claudette	Henry
Edwin

Richard	Beatrice
Alfred	Dorothy
Frances

Edwin and Frances are double first cousins because they share both sets of grandparents as they are cousins through both parents. They are cousins through the siblings Claudette and Alfred as well as the siblings Henry and Dorothy.

Double cousins are relatives who are cousins from two different branches of the family tree. This occurs when siblings, respectively, reproduce with different siblings from another family. This may also be referred to as "cousins on both sides". The resulting children are related to each other through both their parents and are thus doubly related. Double first cousins share both sets of grandparents.

William	Alice	Anthony
Benjamin	Anne	Robert	Cecilie
David	Penelope

David and Penelope are half cousins because they share only one grandparent (Alice) because they are related through half-siblings (Anne and Robert).

Half cousins are descended from half siblings and thus share one grandparent. The children of two half siblings are first half cousins. If half siblings have children with another pair of half siblings, the resulting children are double half first cousins and thus share one grandparent on each side.

While there is no agreed upon term, it is possible for cousins to share three grandparents if a pair of half siblings had children with a pair of full siblings. A real-world example of such a pair is that of Baldwin V of Jerusalem and Maria of Montferrat.

=== Cousins-in-law and non-blood relations ===
Peter	Anne
Arthur	Elizabeth	Charles	Karen	Colin
David	Mary

David and Mary are step-cousins because David's uncle (Charles) is now Mary's stepfather, Mary's mother (Karen) having married Charles.

Step-cousins are either stepchildren of an individual's aunt or uncle, nieces and nephews of one's step-parent, or the children of one's parent's step-sibling. A cousin-in-law is the cousin of one's spouse, the spouse of one's cousin, or the spouse of one's spouse's cousin.

== Consanguinity ==
Consanguinity is a measure of how closely individuals are related to each other. It is measured by the coefficient of relationship. Below, when discussing the coefficient of relationship, we assume the subject and the relative are related only through the kinship term. A coefficient of one represents the relationship one has with oneself. Consanguinity decreases by half for every generation of separation from the most recent common ancestor, as there are two parents for each child. When there is more than one common ancestor, the consanguinity between each ancestor is added together to get the final result.

Between first cousins, there are two shared ancestors each with four generations of separation, up and down the family tree: $\left(\tfrac{1}{2}\right)^4 + \left(\tfrac{1}{2}\right)^4$; their consanguinity is one-eighth. For each additional removal of the cousin relationship, consanguinity is reduced by half, as the generations of separation increase by one. For each additional degree of the cousin relationship, consanguinity is reduced by a quarter as the generations of separation increase by one on both sides.

Half cousins have half the consanguinity of ordinary cousins as they have half the common ancestors (i.e. one vs two). Double cousins have twice the consanguinity of ordinary cousins as they have twice the number of common ancestors (i.e. four vs two). Double first cousins share the same consanguinity as half-siblings. Likewise, double half cousins share the same consanguinity as first cousins as they both have two common ancestors. If there are half-siblings on one side and full siblings on the other, they would have three-halves the consanguinity of ordinary first cousins.

In a scenario where two monozygotic (identical) twins have children with another pair of monozygotic twins, the resulting double cousins would test as genetically similar as siblings.

=== Cousin marriage ===
Cousin marriage is important in several anthropological theories, which often differentiate between matriarchal and patriarchal parallel and cross cousins.

Currently about 10% and historically as high as 80% of all marriages are between first or second cousins. Cousin marriages are often arranged. Anthropologists believe it is used as a tool to strengthen the family, conserve its wealth, protect its cultural heritage, and retain the power structure of the family and its place in the community. Some groups encourage cousin marriage while others attach a strong social stigma to it. In some regions in the Middle East, more than half of all marriages are between first or second cousins (in some of the countries in this region, this may exceed 70%). Just outside this region, it is often legal but infrequent. Many cultures have encouraged specifically cross-cousin marriages. In other places, it is legally prohibited and culturally equivalent to incest. Supporters of cousin marriage often view the prohibition as discrimination, while opponents claim potential immorality.

=== Reproduction ===
Couples that are closely related have an increased chance of sharing genes, including mutations that occurred in their family tree. If the mutation is a recessive trait, it will not reveal itself unless both father and mother share it. Due to the risk that the trait is harmful, children of high-consanguinity parents have an increased risk of recessive genetic disorders.

Research has indicated that related couples have more children: a study of Icelandic couples concluded that those related with consanguinity equivalent to that of third cousins have the greatest reproductive success. This seems counterintuitive as closely related parents have a higher probability of having offspring that are unfit, yet closer kinship can also decrease the likelihood of immunological incompatibility during pregnancy.

The risks of inbreeding extend beyond the immediate descendants of those involved. Sustained cousin marriage within a population group over generations eventually leads to inbreeding at the population level and an increase in genetic disorders that affects the entire population, not just those in cousin marriages. Increased genetic literacy within a population may lead to a reduction in cousin marriage.

== See also ==
- Collateral descendant
- Consanguinity
- Cousin marriage
- Family
- Sibling
- Second-degree relative
