= Gaston of Orléans =

Gaston of Orléans may refer to:

- Gaston, Duke of Orléans (1608–1660)
- Prince Gaston, Count of Eu (1842–1922)
