= Blanche of France =

Blanche of France may refer to:

- Blanche of Castile (1188–1252), queen of Louis VIII of France
- Blanche of France (1253–1323), daughter of Louis IX of France and Margaret of Provence; wife of Ferdinand de la Cerda; Blanche of France, Infanta of Castile
- Blanche of France (1282–1305), daughter of Philip III of France and Marie of Brabant, Queen of France; wife of Rudolph I of Bohemia; Blanche of France, Duchess of Austria
- Blanche of France (daughter of Philip IV)
- Blanche of France (nun) (1313–1358), daughter of Philip V of France and Joan II of Burgundy
- Blanche of France, Duchess of Orléans (1328–1393), daughter of Charles IV of France and Jeanne d'Évreux; wife of Philip of Valois, Duke of Orléans
- Blanche d'Orléans (1857–1932), granddaughter of Louis Philippe I.
