= Portrait of the Duchess of Nemours =

Painting by Franz Xaver Winterhalter

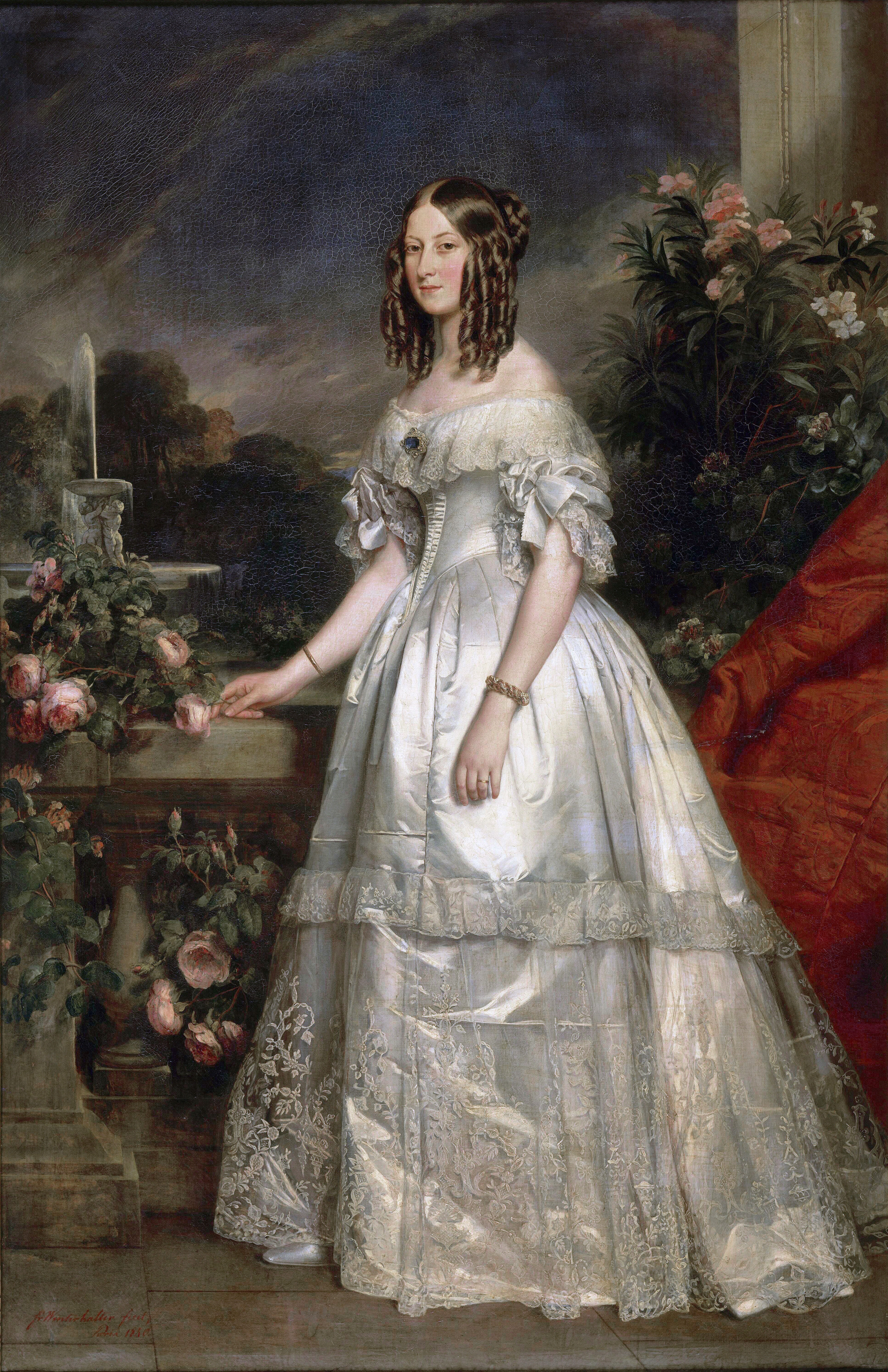
- Artist: Franz Xaver Winterhalter
- Year: 1840
- Type: Oil on canvas, portrait painting
- Dimensions: 215 cm × 140 cm (85 in × 55 in)
- Location: Palace of Versailles, Versailles

Portrait of the Duchess of Nemours is an oil on canvas portrait painting by the German artist Franz Xaver Winterhalter, from 1840. It is held at the Palace of Versailles.

== History ==
It depicts Princess Victoria of Saxe-Coburg and Gotha, the Viennese-born member of House Saxe-Coburg and Gotha. On 27 April 1840 she married Prince Louis, Duke of Nemours at the Château de Saint-Cloud. He was the second son of Louis Philippe I, the French Monarch. This dynastic match further strengthened the ties between France and Britain as Duchess Victoria was a first cousin of both Queen Victoria and Prince Albert. The couple had four children together. She died at the age of thirty-five in exile in England following the overthrow of the July Monarchy in the French Revolution of 1848. In 1852, Winterhalter painted The Cousins, a dual portrait of Victoria and the Duchess.

Commissioned by Louis Philippe I for 4,000 francs for the Tuileries Palace in 1840 The painting was displayed at the Salon of 1841 held at the Louvre in Paris. It remains in the collection of the Musée de l'Histoire de France at the Palace of Versailles.

== Bibliography ==
- Hensel, Tina. Das Bild der Herrscherin: Franz Xaver Winterhalter und die Gattungspolitik des Porträts im 19. Jahrhundert. Walter de Gruyter, 2023. ISBN 3111084876.
