= Blanche d'Orléans =

Child of Prince Louis

Princess Blanche of Orléans
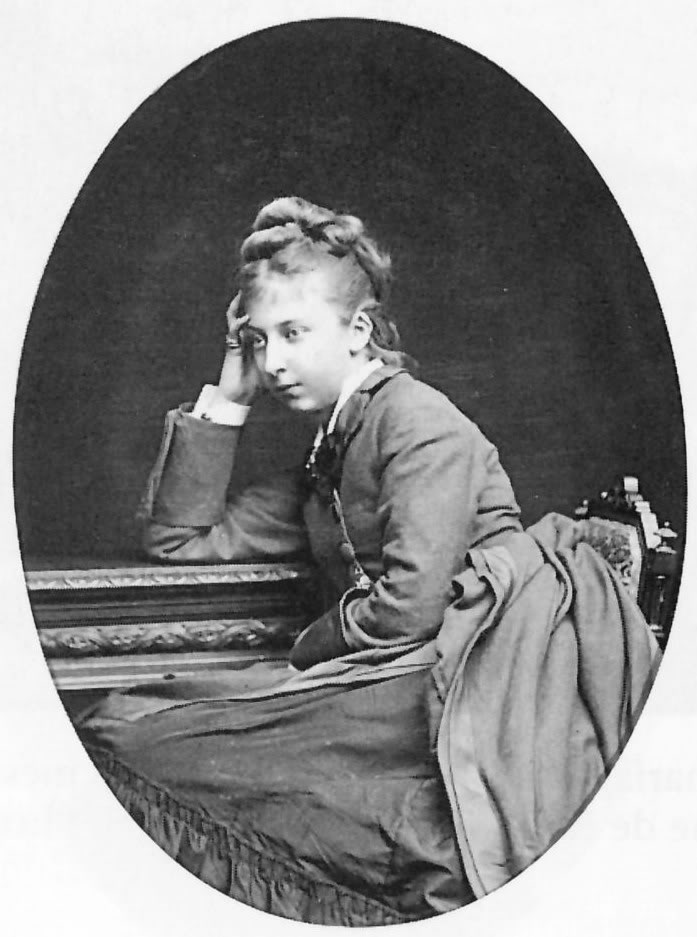
- Blanche, circa 1870s
- Born: 28 October 1857; Claremont House, Esher, Surrey, England, United Kingdom
- Died: 4 February 1932 (aged 74); 16th Arrondissement, Paris, France
- Father: Prince Louis, Duke of Nemours
- Mother: Princess Victoria of Saxe-Coburg and Gotha

Blanche Marie Amélie Caroline Louise Victoire d'Orléans (28 October 1857 – 4 February 1932) was the fourth and last child of Prince Louis, Duke de Nemours and Princess Victoria of Saxe-Coburg and Gotha, and the granddaughter of Louis Philippe I, the last king of France.

== Biography ==
=== Early life ===
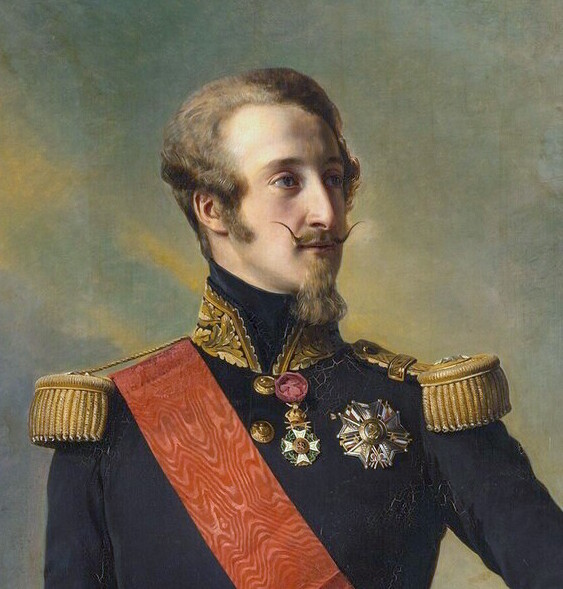
Louis, Duke of Nemours by Franz Xavier Winterhalter

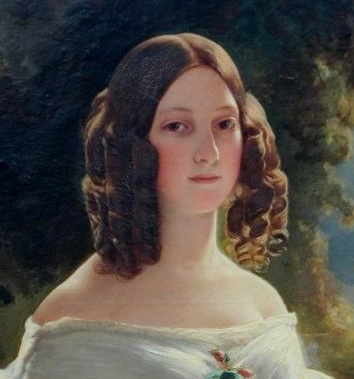
Victoria of Saxe-Coburg-Gotha by Franz Xavier Winterhalter

Blanche d'Orléans was born at Claremont House in Surrey in 1857. Her family had lived there after the February Revolution of 1848. She was the only child of the royal couple born in exile, and there was a gap of nine years between Blanche and her nearest sibling in age, Marguerite.

Her mother died two weeks after giving birth to Blanche. She was christened after her paternal grandmother, her godmother, her godfather, and her mother. Her godparents were her father's younger brother Henri, Duke of Aumale, and his wife Lina.

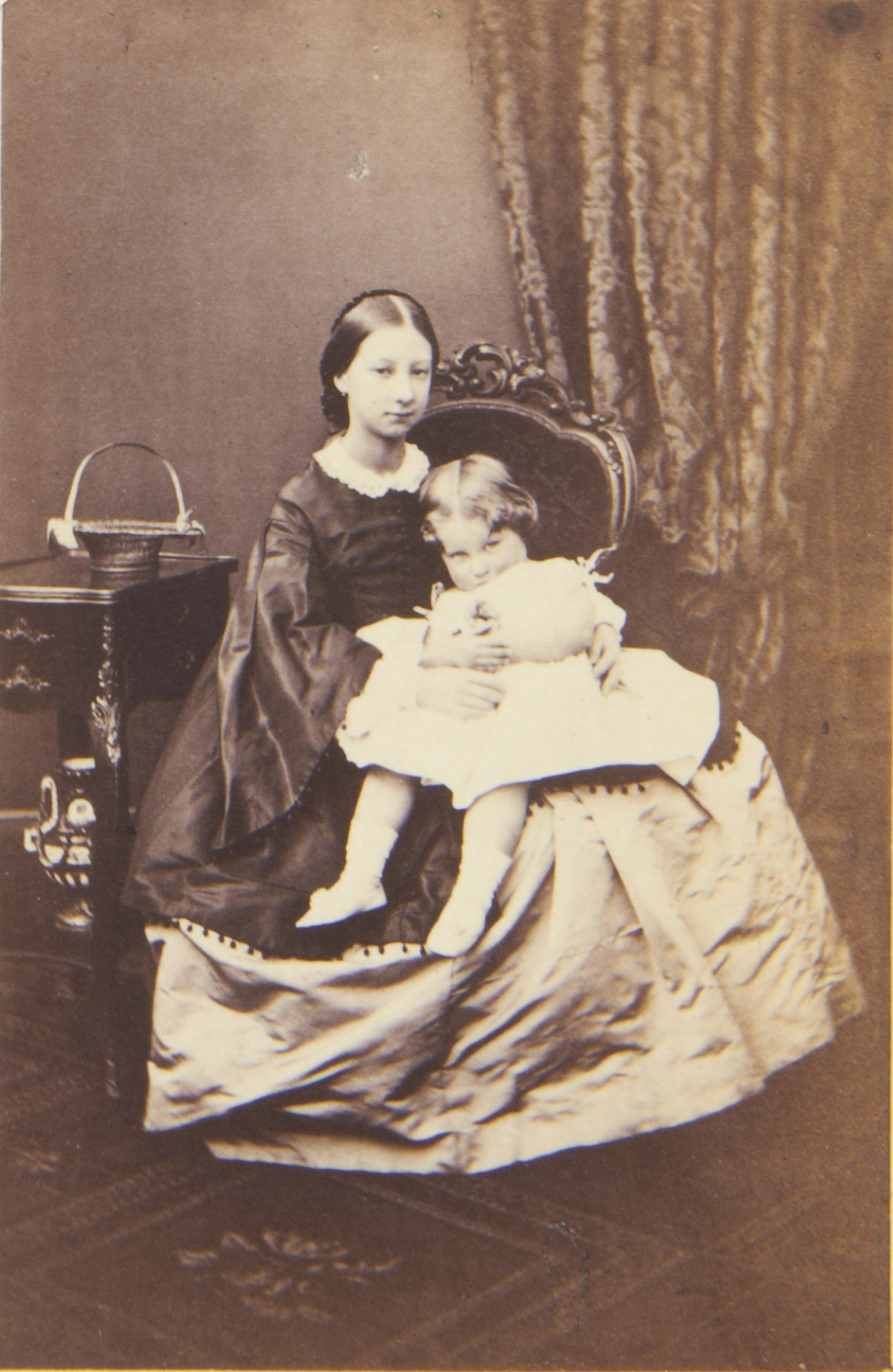
Blanche being held by her older sister Marguerite (c. 1860)

In addition to Marguerite, Blanche also grew up with her two brothers, Gaston (1842–1922) and Ferdinand (1844–1910). Blanche's paternal grandparents, King Louis Philippe and Queen Marie Amélie, also lived with them at Claremont. They were frequently visited by Queen Victoria, who was a first cousin and namesake of Blanche's mother.

The care of Blanche's older sister Marguerite had been entrusted to a close friend and lady in waiting of their mothers, Mlle Laure-Charlotte Bernard de la Grave in 1850, and after the death of their mother she also cared for Blanche and acted as their governess. Blanche and her sister Marguerite were also day pupils at Gumley House school.

During the Franco-Prussian War Marguerite and Blanche d'Orléans, were at the head of relief committees in England for the wounded, prisoners, and French refugees.

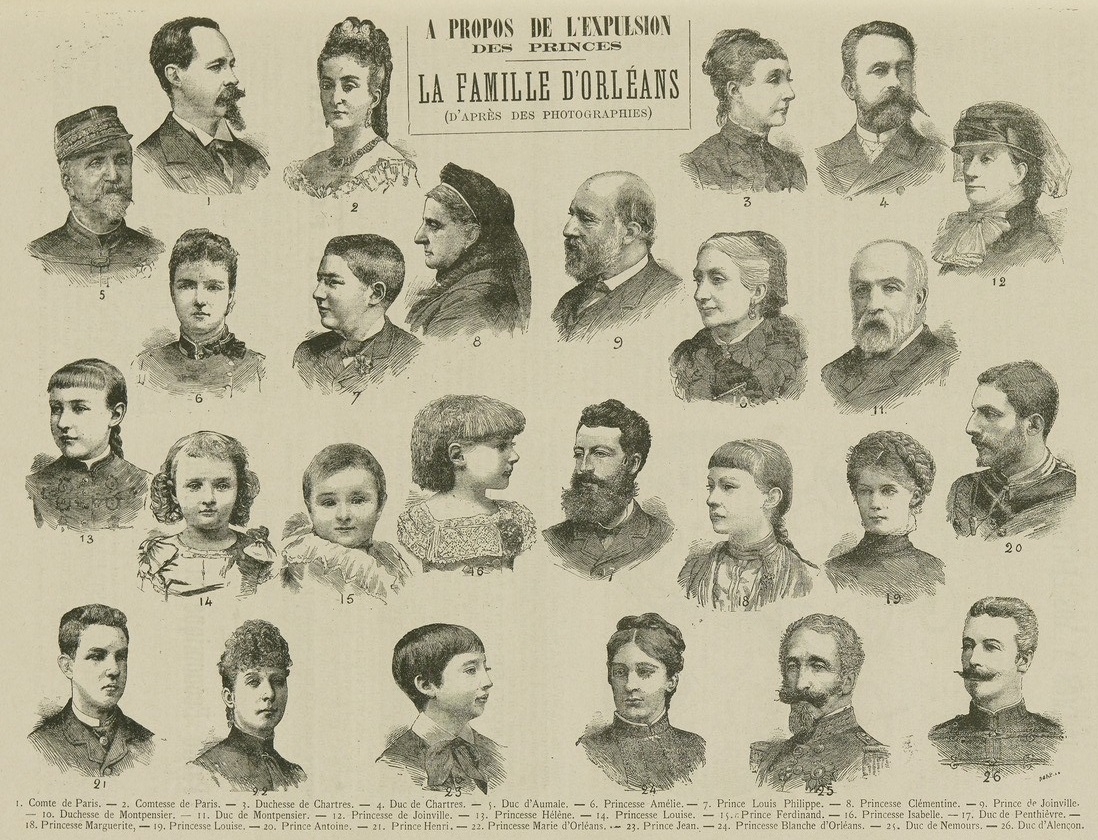
The d'Orléans family in 1886, as illustrated in Gazette de Paris illustrée. Blanche is third from the right on the bottom row.

=== Return to France ===
From 1866 to 1871, the family lived at Bushy House following the death of Blanche's grandmother, Queen Marie Amélie. In 1871, the family's banishment ended, and they moved back to France. Unlike her sister, who married a Polish nobleman the next year, and the news of the day mentioning potential suitors such as the Louis-Napoléon, Prince Imperial, Count of Bari, the Prince de Ligne and Giovanni Andrea Doria Pamphili, Prince of Melfi.

Blanche never married and stayed with her father. According to the memoirs of her relative Isabelle, Blanche had been in love with an English lord but the relationship had been discouraged by her father.

Described as a tall but fragile looking and pale young woman with blonde hair and blue eyes, she was thought to take after her father in both looks and personality. In her letters to Queen Victoria, Blanche's aunt Clementine mentions her poor health and difficult character. Blanche fell severely ill in 1880, with her death being feared, though she recovered , in order to strengthen her health Blanche spent time in seaside town of Dinard. with her former governess Mme Bernard acting as her lady in waiting.

Blanche enjoyed painting and was a pupil of painter Joseph Aubert. Among her work is an 1877 portrait of an African hunter. She painted many works with religious subject for churches, among them is mentioned a painting of Jeanne de France, with the saint looking like Blanche's deceased mother. The French art critic Antony Valabrègue, described her artistic personality as "..a nature that delights in the pious dreams of a fervent Catholicism. Her paintings, inspired by the primitives, are imbued with a naive sentiment..."

Blanche was also involved in various charitable causes. She was remembered in her niece's memoirs:

She would receive us standing, first looking us up with her small, pale, cold blue eyes; then, using a long, slender index finger at the end of a long, ivory-like hand, she would point us out one by one, asking for our names and ages. Afterward, she would sit in a Voltaire armchair by the window, and the interrogation would continue, covering all manner of subjects. We would stand frozen with shyness... When the session ended, we would take our leave after bowing and kissing her hand. Aunt Blanche was full of whims... She had lived alone since her youth and had always been of a sour disposition; I heard it said that she had once been in love with an English lord, but that her father, the Duke of Nemours, had adamantly refused to allow the marriage. From that time on, she harbored a certain loathing for the family. She had even stipulated in her will that she wished to be buried at Lourdes rather than at Dreux "with those people." To her godson—my brother Dom Joao—she bequeathed... her bulldog!

== List of artworks ==
- African hunters holding moukahla (1877)
- Triptych of Christ on the cross alongside Saint Lawrence and Saint John Nepomuk (1884) in the Saint-Wandrille church. Painted in memory of the Blanche's governess Laure Bernard de la Grave (1818–1884)
- Altarpiece painting of Saint John resting his head on the chest of Jesus(1888) in the church Saint-Louis-en-l'Île.
- Ecstasy of Saint Teresa at the Carmelite convent at Avenue de Saxe.

== Death ==
Blanche died in Paris in her mansion at 9 Avenue Kléber. She was 74 years old and had outlived all her siblings. She was also the last surviving granddaughter of Louis Philippe. Towards the end of her life, she was a recluse, who kept her curtains drawn at all times and was described as; "skinny, tall, all dressed in black, with a Toulouse-Lautrec style hairstyle, but with white hair and not red, covered with a white mantilla".

In her will she stated her wish to be interred at Lourdes rather than at the Chapelle royale de Dreux. She also left her great-nephew and god-child João Maria of Orléans-Braganza a bulldog. The funeral mass was conducted by Bishop Méricq after which the body was taken to the old cemetery at Lourdes.
