= Gaston, Count of Eu =

French prince (1842–1922)

Prince Gaston
- Count of Eu
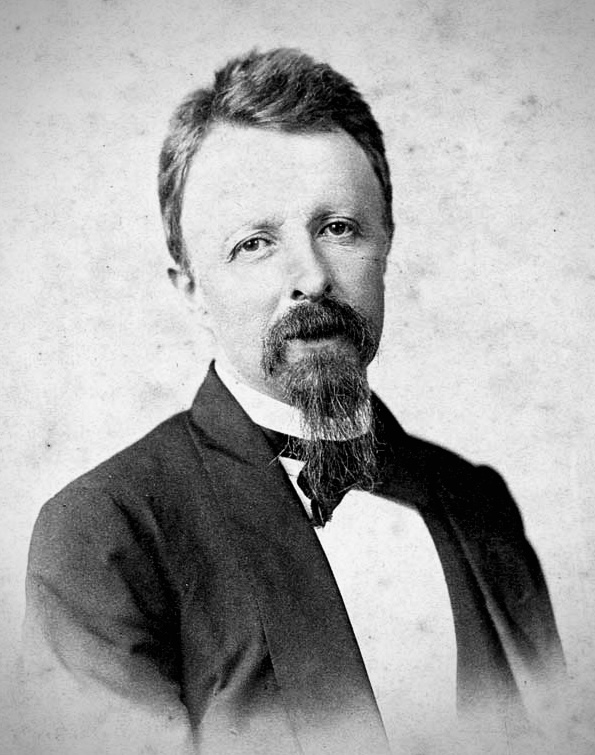
- Gaston d’Orléans, c. 1880s
- Born: 28 April 1842; Neuilly-sur-Seine, France
- Died: 28 August 1922 (aged 80); Rio de Janeiro, Brazil
- Burial: Cathedral of Saint Peter of Alcantara, Petrópolis, Brazil
- Spouse: Isabel, Princess Imperial of Brazil (m. 1864; died 1921)
- Issue: Prince Pedro; Prince Luís; Prince Antônio Gastão
Names
- Louis Philippe Marie Ferdinand Gaston d'Orléans
- House: Orléans
- Father: Prince Louis, Duke of Nemours
- Mother: Princess Victoria of Saxe-Coburg and Gotha

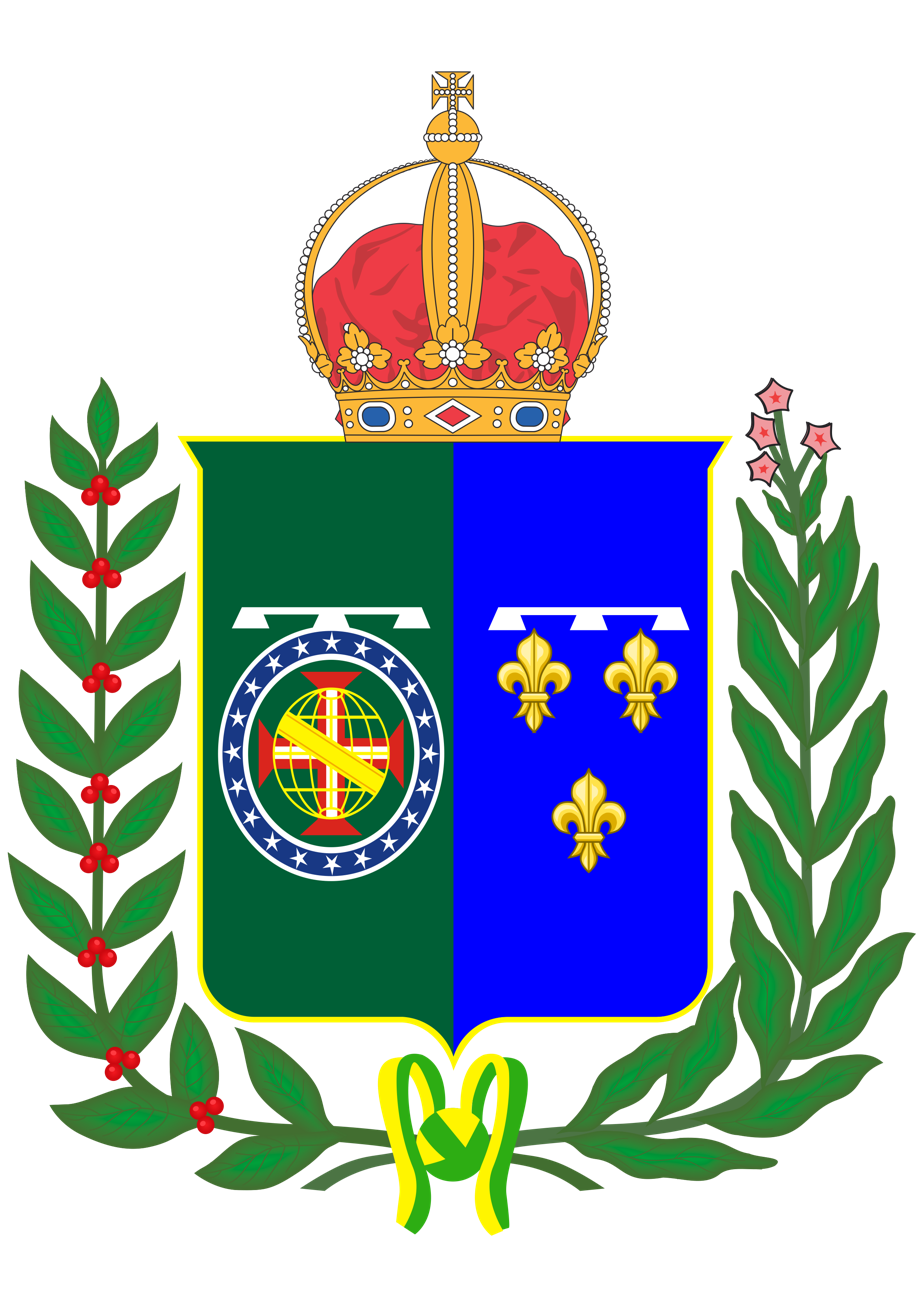
- Coat of Arms of Gaston, Count of Eu

Prince Gaston of Orléans, Count of Eu (French: Louis Philippe Marie Ferdinand Gaston; 28 April 1842 – 28 August 1922) was a French prince of the House of Orléans and a career military officer. He is best known for his service as a senior commander in the Hispano-Moroccan War and for his prominent role in the Paraguayan War, where he commanded Allied forces during the final phase of the conflict. Born into the French royal family as the eldest son of Louis, Duke of Nemours and Princess Victoria of Saxe-Coburg and Gotha, Gaston later became a central figure in Brazilian imperial history through his marriage to Princess Isabel, daughter and heir of Pedro II of Brazil. As prince consort to the heiress presumptive, he played a significant role in the political, military, and dynastic affairs of the Empire of Brazil during its final decades.

== Early years ==
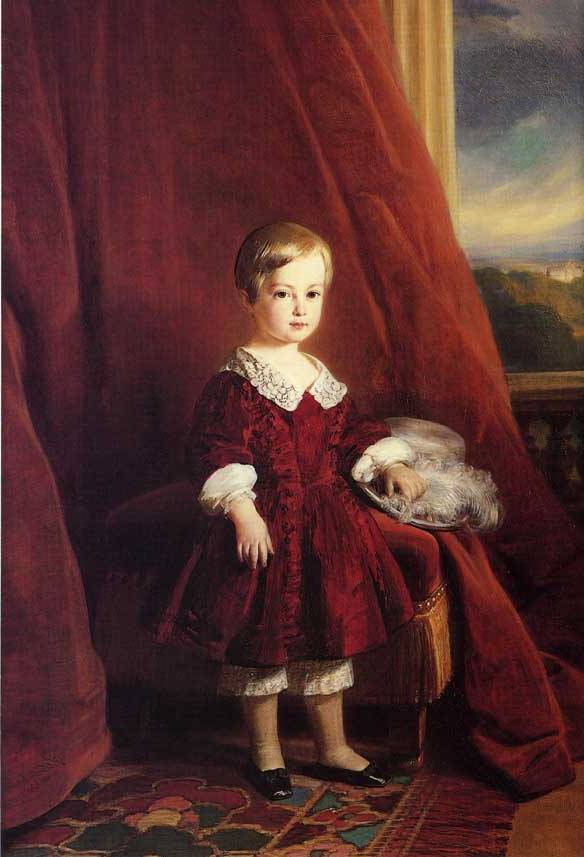
Gaston d'Orléans at the age of five, by Franz Xaver Winterhalter

Gaston was born Louis Philippe Marie Ferdinand Gaston of Orléans (Portuguese: Luís Filipe Maria Fernando Gastão de Orleães) on 28 April 1842 in Neuilly-sur-Seine, a suburb of Paris, at the Château de Neuilly. He was the eldest son of Louis, the Duke of Nemours and Princess Victoria of Saxe-Coburg and Gotha. His paternal grandparents were King Louis Philippe I, King of the French, and Maria Amalia of the Two Sicilies, and his maternal grandparents were Prince Ferdinand of Saxe-Coburg and Gotha and Princess Maria Antonia von Koháry.

A member of the French royal family, Gaston belonged to the House of Orléans, a cadet branch of the House of Bourbon, that in turn belonged to the Capetian dynasty. A Prince of Orléans, he was titled Count of Eu (comte d'Eu) at birth by his grandfather, King Louis Philippe.

He was a first cousin once removed of both the British Monarch Queen Victoria and of her husband Albert, Prince Consort, through his mother, Princess Victoria of Saxe-Coburg and Gotha.

The prince received a refined education under Julio Gauthier and the historian Auguste Trognon. He learned several foreign languages, which included Latin, English, German and Portuguese.

His grandfather abdicated during the Revolution of 1848. Only five years old at the time, Gaston followed the king and his family, who went into exile in Great Britain, establishing themselves in an old mansion at Claremont, in the southern region of England.

In 1855, at the age of 13, Gaston began his military career in an artillery course, concluding in the Military School of Segovia, Spain, where he became a captain. He had moved to Spain, after following his uncle, Antoine, the Duke of Montpensier's orientation. The Duke had lived there since his marriage to Infanta Luisa Fernanda, sister of Queen Isabel II of Spain.

== Isabel, Princess Imperial of Brazil ==
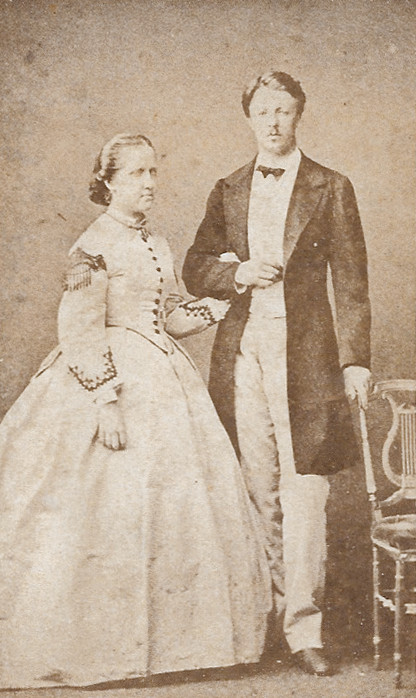
Gaston d'Orléans and Isabel, Princess Imperial of Brazil

After years with problems on the border with Morocco caused by constant attacks on Spanish cities by Moroccan pirates, Spain declared war on Morocco. The young Gaston was sent as a subordinate officer to participate in the conflict on the side of the Spanish forces. The Spanish military consisted of more than 40,000 soldiers, while the Moroccan troops numbered about 140,000 men. The Count participated in all of the battles, and after the end of the conflict he returned to Spain with a reputation for his military prowess.

A few years later, his uncle, King Ferdinand II of Portugal proposed that he should marry one of the two daughters of the Emperor Pedro II of Brazil. He agreed to accept the proposal, but only after meeting the princesses. The Emperor's sister, Princess Francisca, who was married to the Count's uncle, the Prince of Joinville, wrote a letter to her brother describing the Count. "If you could grab this one for one of your daughters it would be excellent. He is robust, high, handsome, good natured, very amiable, much instructed, studious, and in addition, he possesses now a small military fame."

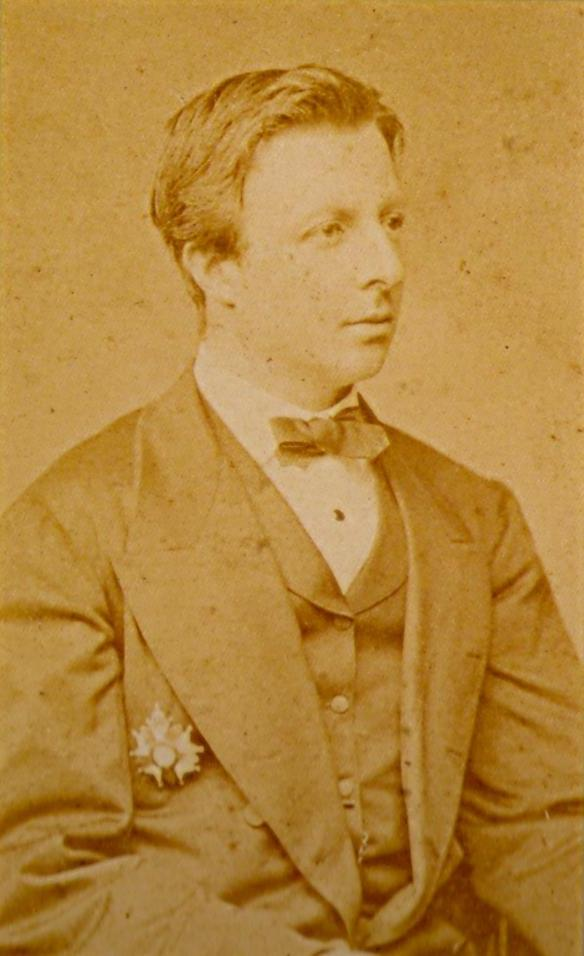
Gaston d'Orléans, 1865

Gaston arrived in Rio de Janeiro on 2 September 1864 in the company of his double first cousin, Prince Ludwig August of Saxe-Coburg and Gotha, and went directly to the Palace of São Cristóvão to meet the Brazilian imperial family. However, Gaston was less than enthusiastic about the two princesses, whom he considered unattractive. Initially, the young Count was promised to Princess Leopoldina and his cousin to Princess Isabel. However, after getting to know them better, the Emperor decided to invert the pairs. Gaston became attached to Isabel. They were married on 15 October 1864. Earlier, Gaston was awarded the Grand Cross of the Imperial Order of the Southern Cross and a few days later accepted the honorary presidency of the Brazilian Geographic and Historical Institute.

In 1892, Alfredo d'Escragnolle, Vicomte de Taunay, gave his opinion regarding the two cousins when they first arrived in Brazil. He said that the duke of Saxe "had only interest in spending his life in a lazy and amusing way, he liked a lot of hunting and appreciated a lot the many joys that existed in Europe, while the comte d'Eu with all the defects that I can point at him, cared sincerely and a lot for Brazil and, believe it or not, he still loves it today with intensity and no second intention."

== Paraguayan War ==
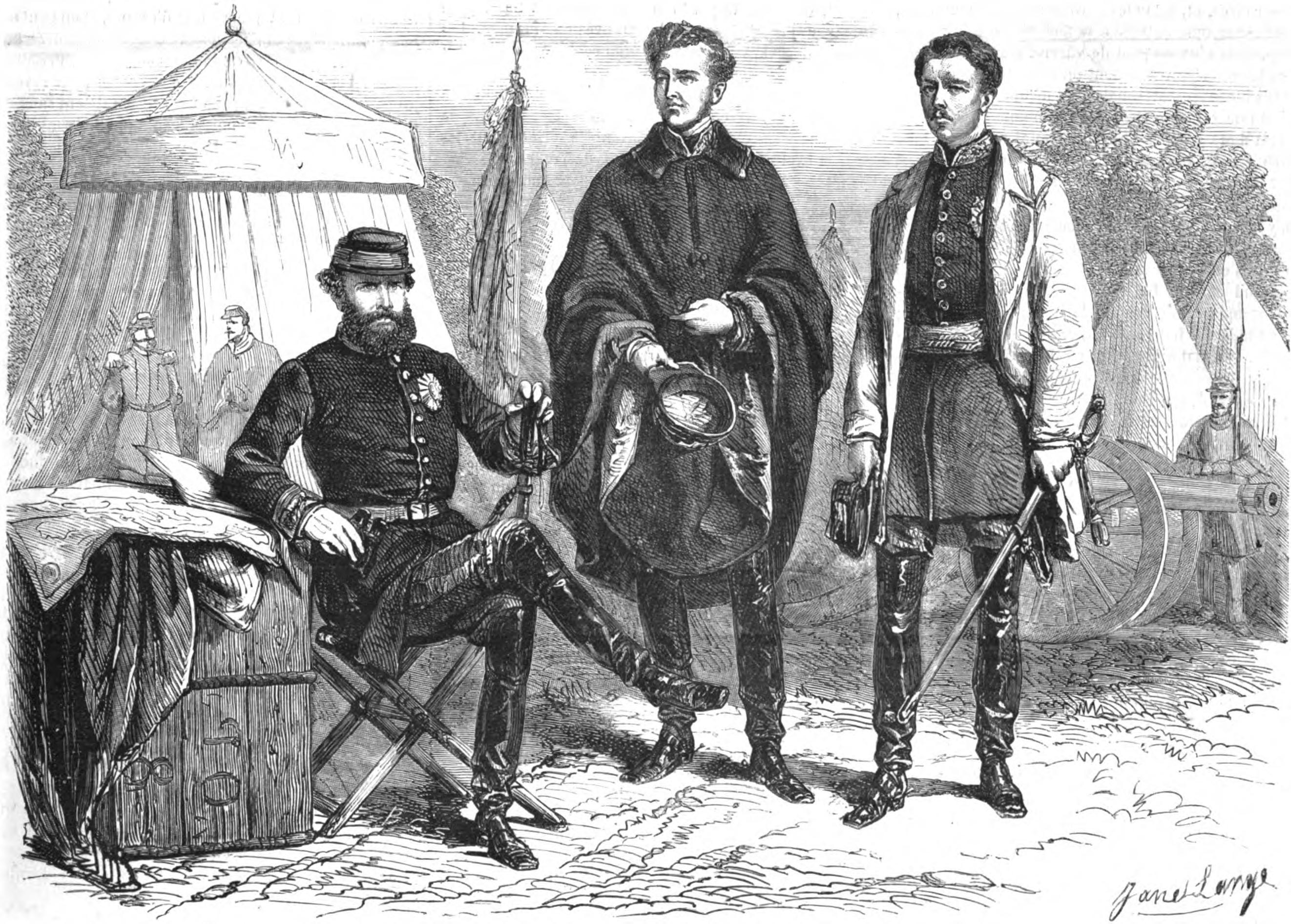
War against Paraguay: The Emperor of Brazil with his two sons-in-law, the Duke of Saxe-Coburg and Gotha and the Count of Eu, in Alegrete, southern Brazil (L'Illustration, 1865)

Gaston and Isabel were travelling in Europe on their honeymoon when Paraguayan forces invaded the Brazilian provinces of Mato Grosso and Rio Grande Do Sul. From the city of Uruguaiana in the southern region of Brazil, Pedro II sent a letter to the couple requesting Gaston's presence in Brazil, directing the Count to join him and the Brazilian army, together with the Duke of Saxe.

Uruguaiana had been conquered by the Paraguayan army. The Conde d'Eu, and the Emperor, Pedro II of Brazil, joined President Bartolomé Mitre of Argentina in the Siege of Uruguaiana, which ended 18 September 1865.

In his memoirs, the Viscount of Taunay wrote of his experience in the Paraguayan War, along with observances of his fellow soldiers. "While Gaston showed in all occasions a great interest for the things of Brazil, observing, asking, visiting all the places and going after correct and accurate information, while the other [August Luis, duke of Saxe] did not show anything except for indifference and lack of ambition." He was later nominated general commander of the artillery and president of the Commission of Improvements of the Army on 19 November 1865.

On two occasions throughout the conflict, Gaston sent requests to the Emperor asking him to authorize his participation in the war against Paraguay. The Council of State declined his request. The rationale was a strategic act, believing that the presence of a prince in the conflict would escalate the desire to conquer their country's territories. Additionally, it was unacceptable for the husband of the heiress of the throne to subordinate to a Brazilian military officer, who, at this time, was Luis Alves de Lima and Silva, the Marquis of Caxias, the just-nominated allied commander-in-chief.

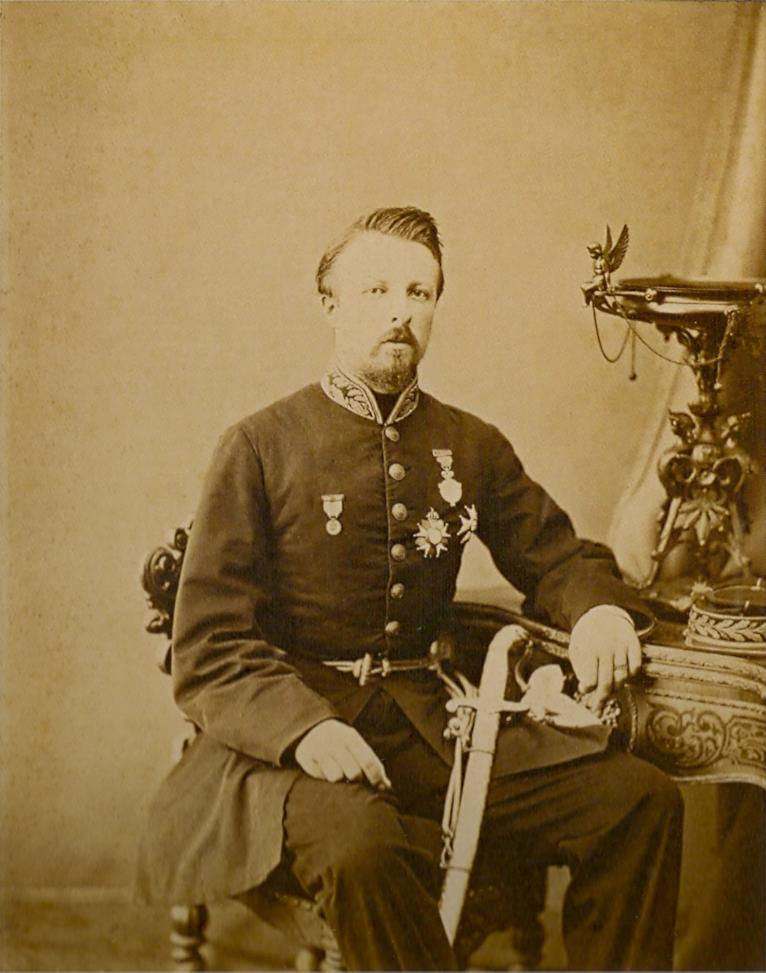
Gaston d'Orléans, Count of Eu, at the age of 28

On 22 March 1869, Gaston was assigned to lead as commander-in-chief of the allied armies, after the Marquis of Caxias renounced that position. This delegation of authority was based on the prestige as an officer of high rank, as well as his reputation and well-known capacity in military action.

The choice of Gaston as the new commander-in-chief, at the age of 27, brought joy to the Brazilian public. During this time a great number of Brazilian believed that the conflict and continued hunt for Francisco Solano López, the Paraguayan dictator, was futile and unnecessary. Gaston shared this belief. When he arrived at Paraguay, he reorganized the Brazilian army and fired the officers accused of pillage in enemy territory.

He used diversified tactics to deceive the Paraguayan army about how and where the allied army would carry its attacks. In the opinion of the Viscount of Taunay, Gaston showed "great strategical ability, cool temper, patience of an experienced leader and unquestionable courage." He also participated actively in the battles that occurred, in the Battle of Acosta Ñu, where he suffered great risk of life. It was the Count's idea to definitively extinguish the slavery of approximately 25,000 individuals in Paraguay, many of whom were obliged to fight in the war against the Triple Alliance.

Gaston suffered heavy criticism after he discovered that the brigadier João Manuel Mena Barreto had died in the battle that resulted in the conquest of the village of Piribebuy (Battle of Piribebuy) which at that time was named "the third capital of Paraguay" after the occupation of Asunción and Luque earlier in 1868. He was also criticized for ordering the decapitation of commander Pedro Pablo Caballero and Patricio Marecos, head politician of the village. In September, the Count became greatly depressed, due to the high number of deaths caused by the conflict. Until the end of the war on 1 March 1870, he participated nominally in the action of the allied army. When he returned to Brazil on 29 April 1870, he was received as a war hero. He was also nominated as a member of the Council of State on 6 July of the same year.

=== Modern critics of Gaston d'Orléans in the war ===
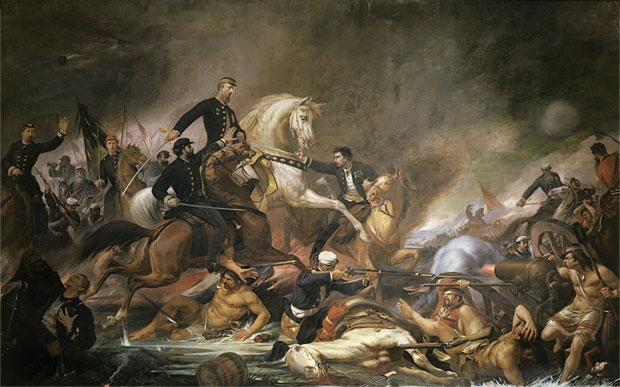
The painting depicts the moment when the Count of Eu is unable to continue the attack against the Paraguayans by his aide-de-camp, Captain Almeida Castro, who holds the reins of the horse ridden by Gaston.

After the 1960s, revisionist historians appeared, portraying the Gaston d'Orléans as a bloodthirsty mass murderer. Some historians, like Júlio Jose Chiavenato, accuse him of having committed war crimes and being most interested in engaging in war, if only to pursue López. Revisionist historians also accuse Gaston of having ordered a grass fire, in order to asphyxiate wounded Paraguayan soldiers who were still in the field after the battle of Acosta Ñu. Chiavenato uses as a source, the memoirs of the Viscount of Taunay.

Recently, it has been found that the memoirs say something completely different. "There were bullets that still blew up in the field because of the fire in the grass that was started in the beginning of the battle by the Paraguayans to occult their tactical movement." There is a mention of an episode, where Gaston ordered the troops to set fire in a hospital full of wounded Paraguayan soldiers that resulted in the death of more than a hundred victims. However, the hospital may have been collateral damage caused by allied bombardment at the beginning of the battle, directed on the Paraguayan military defense and not as the result of a deliberate desire of killing defenseless people.

== Family life ==
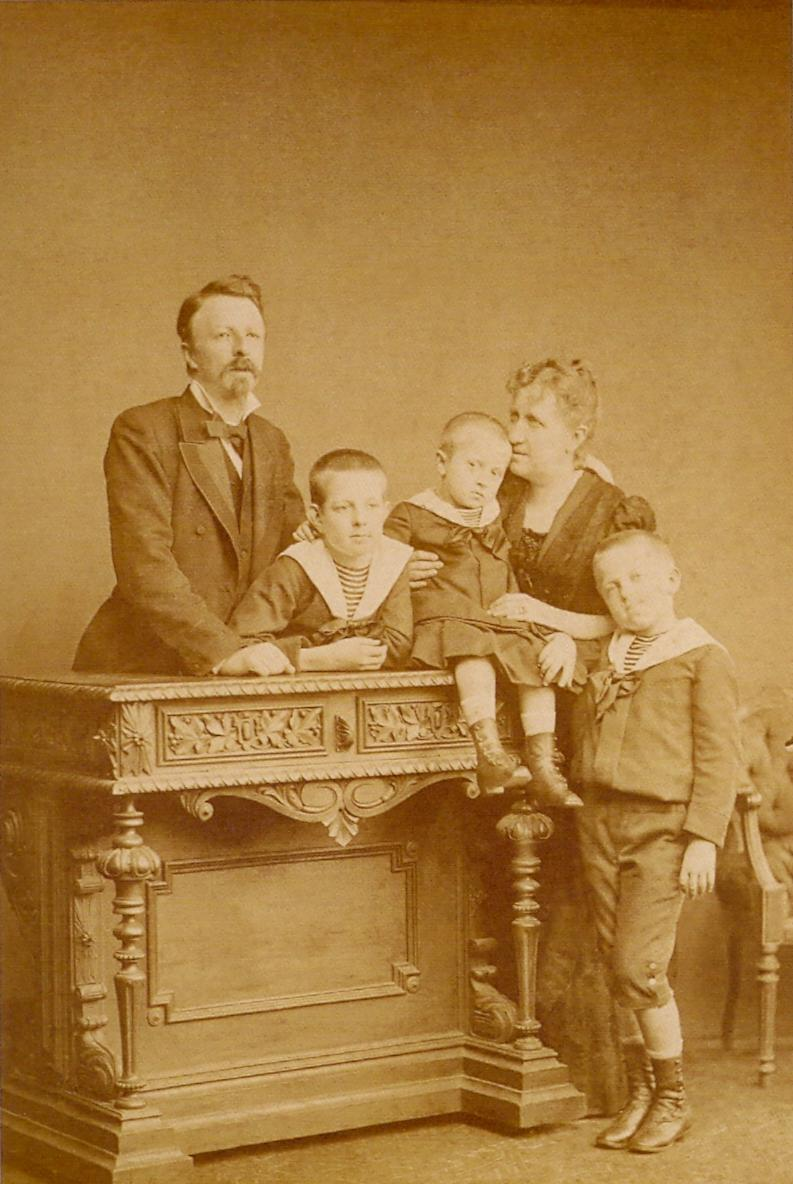
From left to right: Gaston, Pedro, Antonio, Isabel and Luís

Although initially disillusioned with the seeming lack of beauty of his wife, Gaston came to love her until the last days of his life, a feeling returned by Isabel. The birth of their son, Pedro, on 15 October 1875, brought much happiness for the couple, who for almost ten years had been unable to conceive. The arrival of their son also served to lighten the pain of the loss of their first child, Luisa Victoria, who died due to complications of childbirth on 28 July 1874.

Although crippled by a defect in the left arm caused by problems in childbirth, Pedro was a very healthy child and would be affectionately called "Baby" by his parents, even as a young adult. The Count always treated his wife with patience, pleasantness and determination to help her pass through the depression she suffered from, presuming that she somehow could have avoided Pedro's birth defect. His happiness became visible in the letter that he wrote to his father soon after the birth of his third child, in which he stated, "We are really happy, grateful and glad. Having two healthy children after so many misfortunes that made me lose any hope of becoming a father, exceeds what I dared myself to expect."

Their third child was a son, Luiz de Orléans e Bragança, born 26 January 1878 and named after Gaston's father. Some years later, this child became Isabel's heir, after his elder brother renounced his succession to the throne. Antonio was the fourth and last son, born on 9 August 1881 in Paris, where the couple had lived for three years. Antonio was nicknamed "Totó" by his family.

The Count was a very simple person and tried to pass this characteristic on to his children. He had a complete aversion to the lifestyle of European nobility and royalty, which he called "futile" and "stupid".

In 1882, Gaston chose Benjamin Franklin Ramiz Galvão, a professor at the School of Medicine of Rio de Janeiro and headmaster of the National Library, to educate his children. The prince recognized the professor's merit and did not care that Benjamin was a republican. Gaston and his wife provided their children with a simple education, allowing them to study at the father Moreira's school in Petropolis, and later at the school Pedro II.

== Life as Prince Imperial of Brazil ==
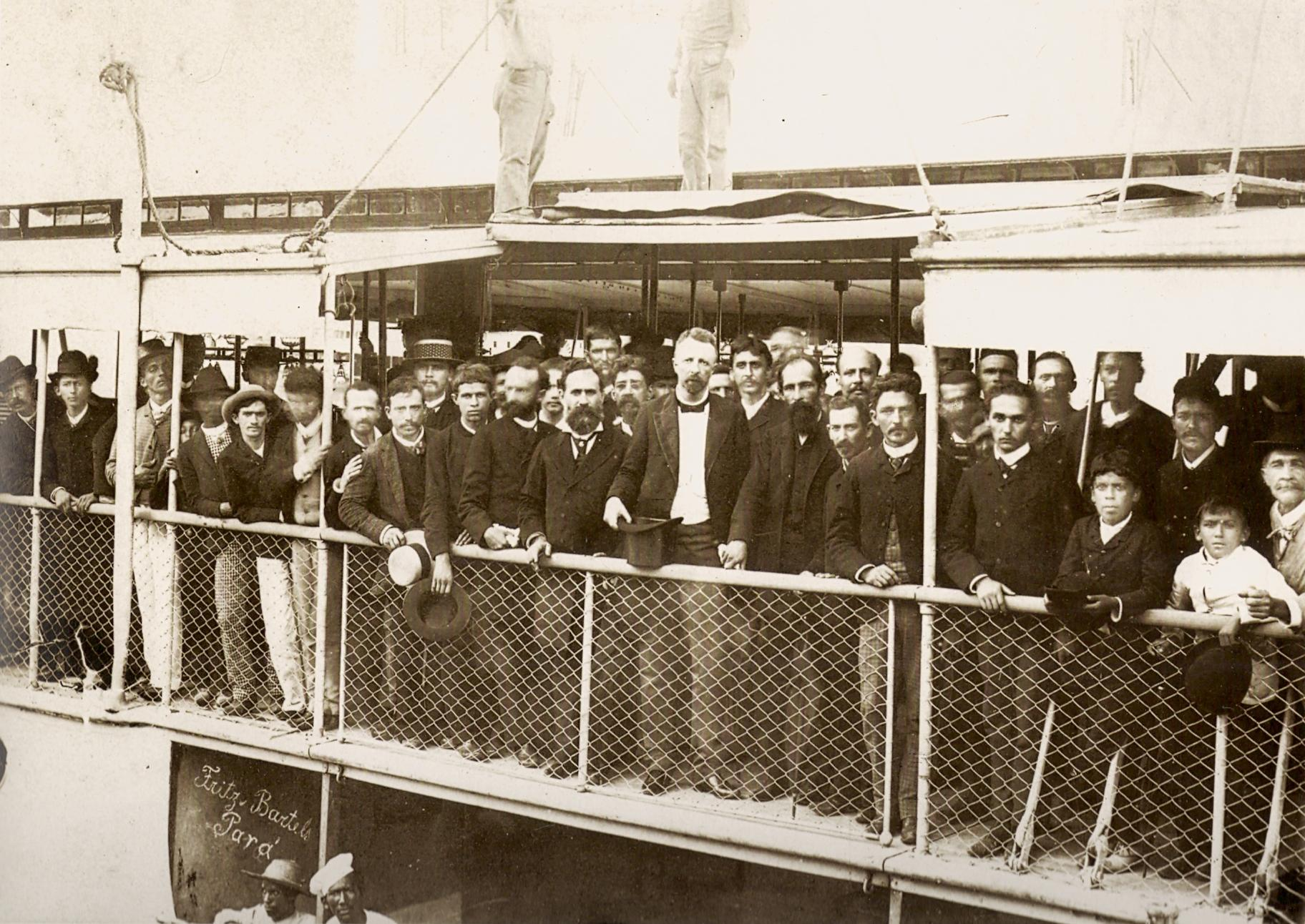
Gaston d'Orléans, the count of Eu, surrounded by a crowd on his arrival in Belém do Pará, in the northern region of Brazil.

Following his marriage to Isabel, Gaston participated actively in the Brazilian government, making commentaries and offering advice about the development of the country. The idea of living as a mere shadow to his wife deeply dissatisfied him. However, Pedro II never allowed either Gaston nor Isabel to participate in the decisions of the government, and refused to discuss state matters with the couple in any form.

This line of demarcation created serious discord between Gaston and his father-in-law, almost to the point of disruption had not Isabel interceded. She attempted to mediate the misunderstandings between the emperor and her husband. As time passed, Gaston became used to the idea of not having any power. It was 1889, before he was able to constructively discuss politics with his father-in-law for the first time.

Gaston's exclusion from the Brazilian political arena necessitated the pursuit of alternate activities. He and his wife turned their attention toward philanthropic endeavors, choosing to support several charities and social institutions. José Avelino, who participated in the first Brazilian republican constituent, years after the end of the monarchy made several remarks about the Count of Eu.

Whatever was possible to make him earn the title of Brazilian he made it: regulations, projects of law for better organization of the Army and perfecting of its material of war; schools, libraries, orphanages for the abandoned children; everything that could help the unprotected or the diverse groups of the society, he planned or executed for the most part.

Gaston visited almost all of the provinces of the country, more than any other member of the imperial family. He travelled to the southern region, as well as the northeast and the far north of Brazil. By the end of the Empire, he made a great trip to the north of Brazil being very well received by all, showing that the monarchy was still popular. After he returned from the Paraguayan War as Marshal-of-the-Army, he became a member of several foreign and Brazilian associations. He was decorated with the medal of the Surrender of Uruguaiana; the Military Merit; the Campaign of Africa and the grand-crosses of Ernest Pious of Saxony; the Orders of the Tower and Sword of the Value, Loyalty and Merit of Christ and of Saint Bento of Avis of Portugal; the order of Leopold of Belgium; the Order of the Red Eagle of Mexico; and was made a knight of the Order of Saint Fernando of Spain.

== Later years ==
=== End of the Brazilian monarchy ===
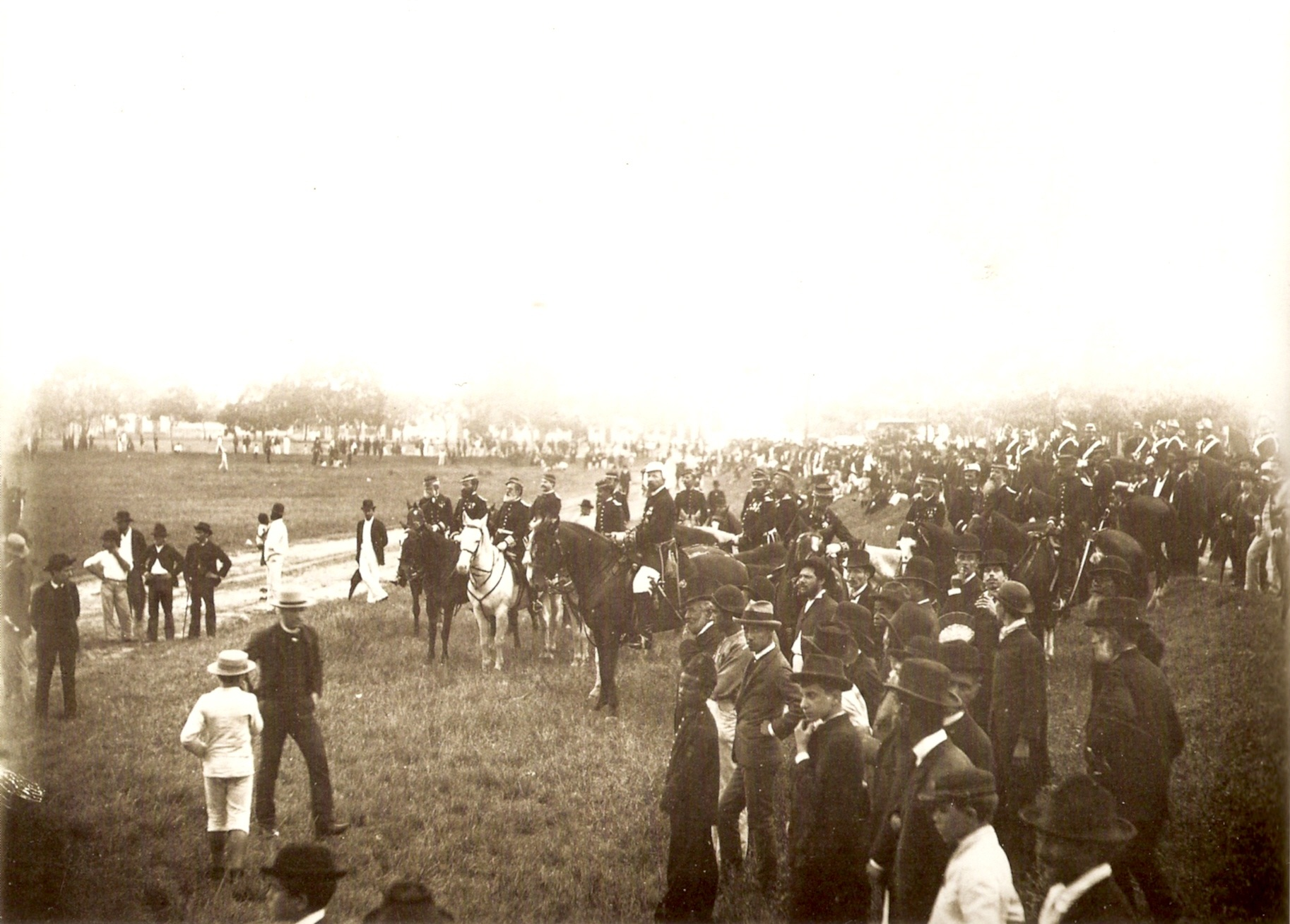
Military training, 1888. The Count of Eu (mounted, at the middle) was incapable of putting any effective resistance to the republican coup that occurred on 15 November 1889, despite the support of loyal Army officers.

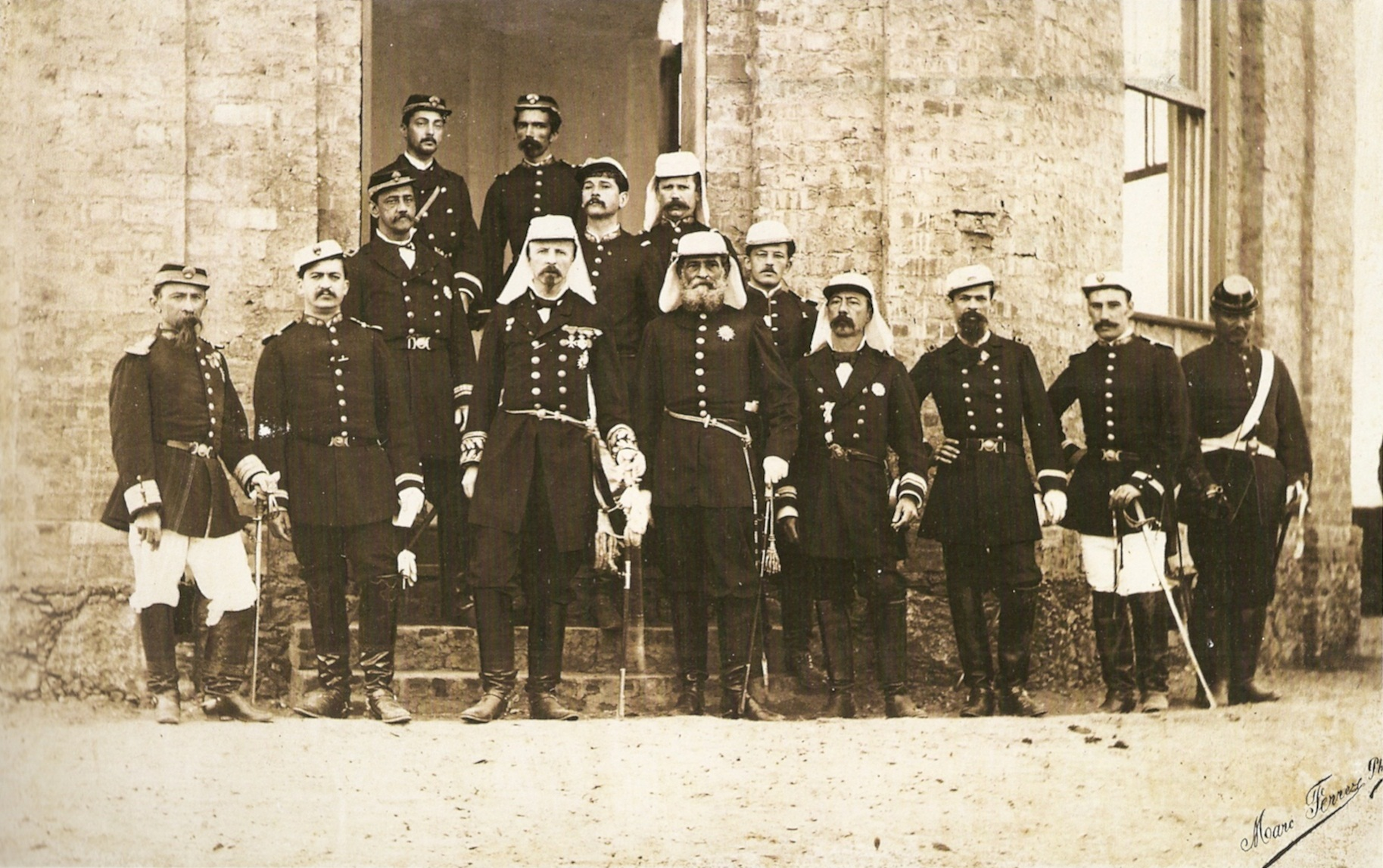
Little did Gaston (first row, third from left to right) know that the Republican leader, Field Marshal Deodoro da Fonseca (to his left), blamed him for the crisis between the government and insubordinate officers.

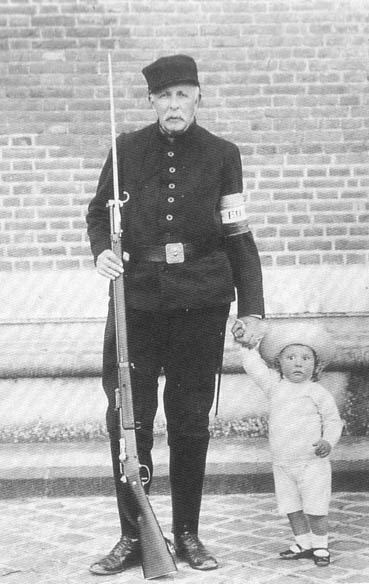
The Count of Eu with his grandson, Prince Pedro Gastão of Orléans-Braganza during the First World War.

Gaston was one of the few eyewitnesses of the military coup d'etát that overthrew the Empire who left written memoirs of it. His three letters – written while he was still in Rio and later aboard the ship that was taking the Imperial family to exile – gives a detailed account of the coup and are one of the main primary sources used by historians. (Note: The complete transcription of the letters can be found in Portuguese on Silva 2005, pp. 345–366. They retell the main events from the Count of Eu's point of view from 2 November 1889 to 4 December.) At the night of 14 November 1889 Gaston was in Rio de Janeiro in his home making the preparations to a reception in honor of Chilean Navy officers visiting the city. A Brazilian major came to warn him of something important, but being too busy and not told of how grave the matter was, Gaston did not meet him. At 8 am of the next day, 15 November, he went to ride with his sons in Botafogo (a neighborhood in Rio) "with no preoccupation at all", in his own words. Upon his return, he read all Rio's newspapers and only one mentioned that apparently a mutiny had occurred in the Military Academy and the Cabinet had met to deal with the matter. Little did Gaston know that a rebellion among the Army corps – led by Field Marshal (nowadays Divisional General) Deodoro da Fonseca – had removed the Cabinet from power by force the night before.

Between 9:30 and 10 a.m. Gaston was told by two officers (Note: Vice Admiral Francisco Pereira Pinto, Baron of Ivinheima and Field Marshal João de Sousa da Fonseca Costa, Viscount of Penha.) of what had happened. Soon others, including military officers, arrived "with confusing news". Upon hearing this, Gaston commented: "In this case, the monarchy has ended." Nonetheless, he dressed himself in his uniform of Marshal of the Army, hoping that it could make the rebels change their minds upon seeing their former commander-in-chief in Paraguay, but soon changed back to his civilian clothes when others around him suggested that it would be useless. Senator Manuel Pinto de Sousa Dantas, a former prime minister, later appeared and told him not to worry and gave his support to the monarchy. Lieutenant André Rebouças, embraced him and told him of a plan he had envisioned with Major Alfredo d'Escragnolle Taunay, Viscount of Taunay, to leave to the nearby city of Petrópolis where they could resist the coup. Gaston agreed and tried to reach the telegraph central by telephone to request it to tell Emperor Pedro II to stay in Petrópolis. At that point, however, the republicans had taken control of the telegraph central. Nonetheless, a telegraph message informed them that the Emperor was arriving in Rio. Gaston sent his children to Petrópolis where he believed they would be safe.

Gaston, his wife Isabel, and many others met Pedro II in the City Palace, located in Rio downtown. It was already afternoon, and Deodoro da Fonseca and the other rebels had returned to their homes. Unbeknownst to Gaston, Deodoro had not overthrown the Emperor, but only the Cabinet and the rebellion seemed to be all over. Pedro II told the prince that he was going to dissolve the rebel battalions. Gaston, far more realistic, complained that the rebels would not simply put their arms down by themselves. He also urged the monarch to form a new cabinet, since the country was effectively without a government. Pedro II did not bother, and told him that he would wait for the prime minister, Viscount of Ouro Preto. "But the ministers are prisoners of the rebels: how does Your Majesty wants them to able to continue to govern?", asked the Prince. (Note: The Emperor: "My opinion is to dissolve the [rebel] battalions." Gaston: "Easy to say, but how does Your Majesty wants to dissolve the corps which has taken arms against Your Majesty? It is needed, first, that Your Majest appoint a [new] cabinet, since the previous has resigned." The Emperor: "But I will not accept those resignations." Gaston: "But the ministers are prisoners of the rebels: how does Your Majesty want them to able to continue to govern?" The Emperor: "But yes! Ouro Preto shall come talk to me." Some time later, Ouro Preto was released and met alone with the Emperor in the palace. The former suggested Pedro II the name of the liberal senator Gaspar da Silveira Martins (who would later lead a major rebellion against the republic in 1893) as his replacement, which was accepted. Silveira Martins was traveling then, and he was expected to arrive in Rio in three days only. Upon learning that from another person, Gaston complained to Pedro II of the mistake he was making: "How does Your Majesty wants us to stay three days without a government, in the present circumstances?" The Emperor: "They shall wait." Gaston: "But it is said that a provisional government has been created, composed of Deodoro, [Quintino] Bocaiúva and Benjamin Constant. Tomorrow in the morning, is not in this very night, we will see its proclamations posted." The Emperor: "I know that, I know that ["Whatever" or "I do not care"]." Gaston: "At least summon the Council of State to help you." The Emperor: "Later on.") No matter what Gaston or the politicians and army officers told him, Pedro II did nothing nor allowed anyone to do anything during those precious hours. Tired of waiting, Gaston requested the presence of all Counselors of State to discuss the present and serious situation. As the Emperor refused to meet them, some of the counselors simply gave up and departed.

The ones who stood agreed to send an envoy to Deodoro to make peace with him. A major was sent and met with the rebel leader in his home at 3 am of 16 November, lying down in his bed, very sick. Deodoro told him that now was too late and he had made his mind and that the monarchy was over. He also accused Gaston of being the one responsible for what the rebels regarded as harassment from the government against the Army. That revealed how successful had been the republican propaganda against the prince, who held absolutely no influence or power in the government. The Imperial family was banished and departed to Europe on 17 November. Despite the lack of any will to resist from Pedro II, there was significant monarchist reaction after the fall of the empire, which was thoroughly repressed. (Note: A few examples can be given. On 17 November 1889, upon hearing the news of the Emperor's fall, the 25th Infantry Battalion resisted by attacking the local Republican Club in Desterro (present-day Florianópolis). They were defeated by Republican militias and policemen and several were killed. Others were executed. According to the source, other battalions across the country also unsuccessfully fought against policemen and militias loyal to the Republic (Mônaco Janotti 1986, p. 17). In Rio de Janeiro, on 18 November between 30 and 40 (Topik 2009, p. 409) monarchist soldiers rebelled. (Topik 2009, p. 126) Other monarchists rebellions occurred in Rio. On 18 December 1889, the 2nd Artillery Regiment – around 50 men (Silva 2005, p. 344) – rebelled in a restorationist attempt (Mônaco Janotti 1986, p. 21). It led the government to ban freedom of speech and exile or arrest several monarchist politicians (Mônaco Janotti 1986, p. 22). Another far more serious monarchist rebellion occurred on 14 January 1890 (Topik 2009, p. 126), when 1 Cavalry Regiment, 2 Infantry Regiments and 1 Artillery Battalion (Topik 2009, p. 410) attempted to overthrown the republic (Topik 2009, p. 126) It had more than 100 casualties, and 21 officers and soldiers who took part of it were executed and more monarchist politicians were arrested (Topik 2009, p. 130). The Federalist Revolution, which occurred from 1893 to 1895, between several monarchists and even republicans led by the monarchists Gaspar da Silveira Martins (Brandão 1996, p. 89), Custódio de Melo (Bueno 2003, p. 247) and Saldanha da Gama (Bueno 2003, p. 247) against the republican government resulted in the deaths of 10,000 people.(Bueno 2003, p. 255) In the War of Canudos, out of 20,000 (Bueno 2003, p. 256) illiterate, miserable and superstitious inhabitants of a small town in the Brazilian northeast who dreamed with the return of a "Dom Pedro III",(Mônaco Janotti 1986, p. 154) only 300 survived the massacre caused by government troops during the revolt's suppression in 1897.(Bueno 2003, p. 260))

=== Exile ===
On 15 November 1889 the Republic was proclaimed in Brazil. The Imperial family was forced into exile, first going in Portugal and later to Normandy, where they settled at the Château d'Eu.

In 1891, Emperor Pedro II died in Paris and his daughter became Empress "Isabel I of Brazil" to the Brazilian Monarchists while, at the same time, the Count of Eu then became Emperor consort. But these titles had little weight and both spouses remained banished from their country.

=== Return to Brazil and death ===
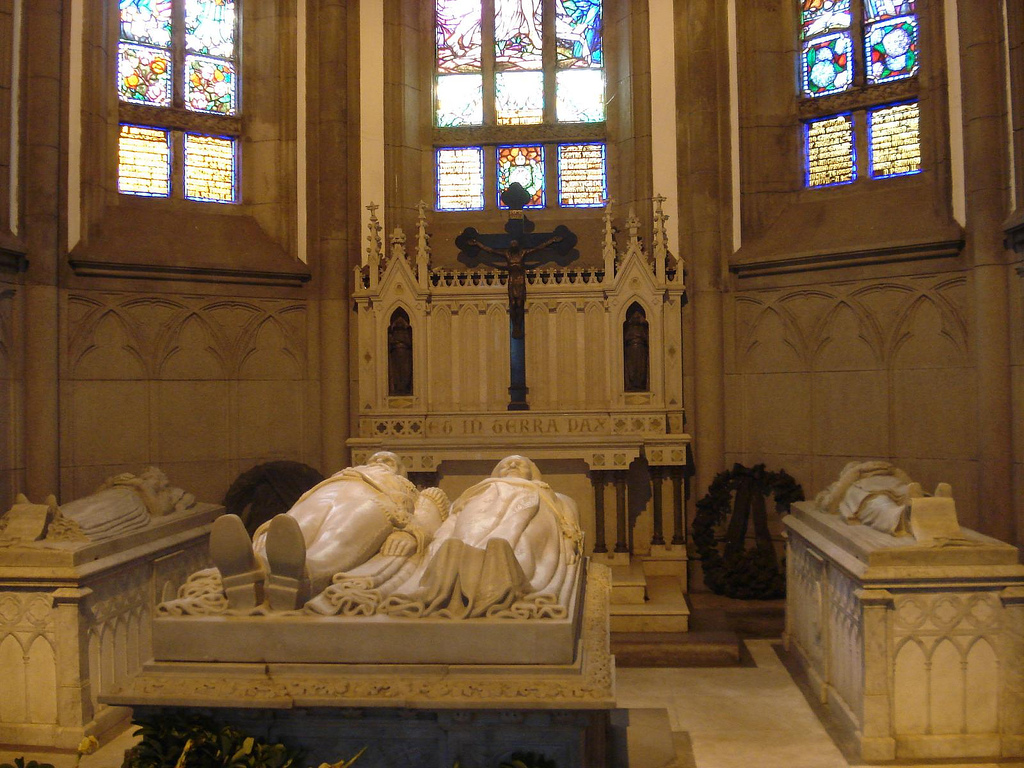
Tomb of Prince Gaston (far right) in the Cathedral of Petrópolis, Brazil.

It was only in 1921 already as a widower that the Count of Eu could finally set foot back in Brazil. At this occasion he retrieved the bodies of his parents-in-law to bury in the Imperial Mausoleum of the Cathedral of Petrópolis. The following year, the Count of Eu died of natural causes at sea off the coast of Brazil, on 28 August 1922, during a journey that would take him back to Brazil to celebrate the first centenary of independence. His body and that of Princess Isabel returned to Brazil together on 7 July 1953, to be buried in the Imperial Mausoleum of the Cathedral of Petrópolis on 12 May 1971.

== Honors ==
Prince Gaston was Grand Cross of the following Brazilian Orders:

- Order of Our Lord Jesus Christ
- Order of Saint Benedict of Aviz
- Order of Saint James of the Sword
- Order of the Southern Cross
- Order of Pedro I
- Order of the Rose

He was a recipient of the following foreign honors:

- Grand Cross of the Order of Ernest the Pious
- Grand Cross of the Austro-Hungarian Order of Saint Stephen
- Grand Cross of the Portuguese Order of the Tower and Sword
- Grand Cross of the Portuguese Military Order of Our Lord Jesus Christ
- Grand Cross of the Portuguese Military Order of Saint Benedict of Aviz
- Knight of the Spanish Order of the Golden Fleece
- Grand Cross of the Royal and Distinguished Spanish Order of Carlos III
- Grand Cordon of the Belgian Order of Leopold
- Grand Cross of the French Légion d'honneur
- Grand Cross of the Imperial Order of the Mexican Eagle
- Grand Cross of the Military Order of Saint Fernando
- Knight of the Bavarian Order of Saint Hubert

== Ancestry ==
Ancestors of Gaston, Count of Eu

8. Louis Philippe II, Duke of Orléans
4. Louis Philippe I of France
9. Louise Marie Adélaïde de Bourbon
2. Prince Louis, Duke of Nemours
10. Ferdinand I of the Two Sicilies
5. Princess Maria Amalia of Naples and Sicily
11. Archduchess Maria Carolina of Austria
1. Prince Gaston, Count of Eu
12. Francis, Duke of Saxe-Coburg-Saalfeld
6. Prince Ferdinand of Saxe-Coburg and Gotha
13. Countess Augusta Reuss of Ebersdorf
3. Princess Victoria of Saxe-Coburg and Gotha
14. Ferenc József, Prince Koháry de Csábrág et Szitnya
7. Princess Maria Antonia Koháry of Csábrág and Szitnya
15. Countess Maria Antonia von Waldstein

Gaston, Count of Eu House of Orléans Cadet branch of the House of Bourbon Born: 28 April 1842 Died: 28 August 1922
Titles in pretence
Vacant Title last held by Teresa Cristina of the Two Sicilies as Empress consort	— TITULAR — Emperor consort of Brazil; 5 December 1891 – 14 November 1921	Vacant Title next held by Maria Elisabeth of Bavaria as Empress consort
