= The Cousins (painting) =

Painting by Franz Xaver Winterhalter

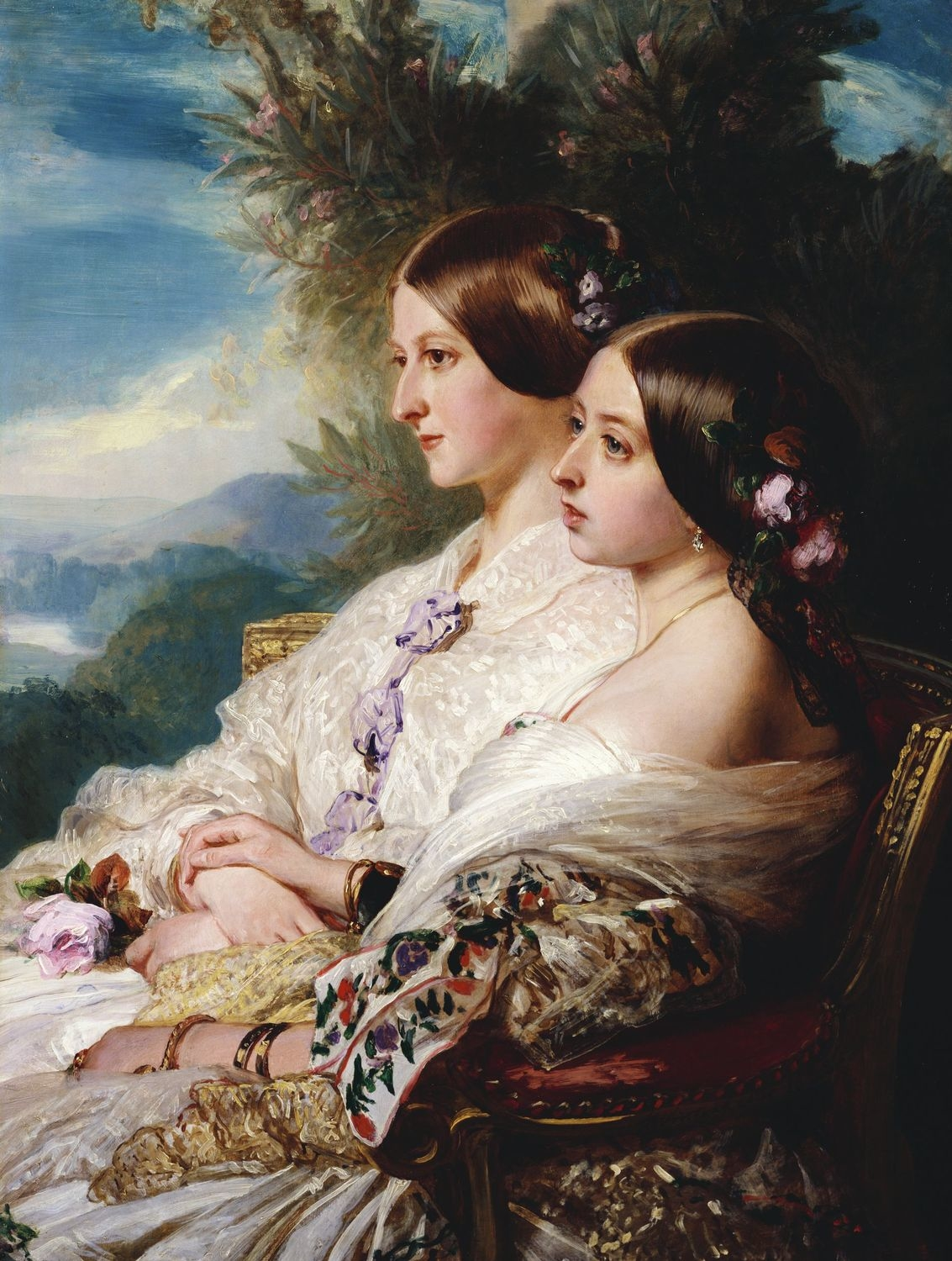
- Artist: Franz Xaver Winterhalter
- Year: 1852
- Type: Oil on canvas, portrait painting
- Dimensions: 66.7 cm × 50.8 cm (26.3 in × 20.0 in)
- Location: Royal Collection

The Cousins is an oil on canvas portrait painting by the German artist Franz Xaver Winterhalter, from 1852.

== History and description ==
It is a dual portrait featuring Queen Victoria and her first cousin Victoria, Duchess of Nemours. The Duchess was also a first cousin of Victoria's husband Prince Albert and had known him in childhood. In 1840 she had married the Duke of Nemours, the second son of Louis Philippe I, but following the fall of the July Monarchy during the Revolution of 1848 she had gone into exile in England. She lived at Claremont House in Surrey but frequently called on Victoria at Buckingham Palace in London. It was there that the secret sittings for the painting took place, which was then given to Albert as a birthday present that year. It was later hung in the Queen's bedroom at Osborne House on the Isle of Wight. Winterhalter was known for his portraits of royalty, and produced numerous paintings featuring the members of both the British and French royal families. Today the painting remains in the Royal Collection.

== Bibliography ==
- Marsden, Jonathan. Victoria & Albert: Art & Love. Royal Collection, 2010. ISBN 1905686218.
- Paoli, Dominque. Fortunes et infortunes des princes d'Orléans: 1848-1918. Artena, 2006. ISBN 2351540042.
- Plumb, John Harold. Royal Heritage: The Story of Britain's Royal Builders and Collectors. Crescent Books, 1985. ISBN 0563170824.
- Warner, Malcolm, Helmreich, Anne & Brock, Charles. The Victorians: British Painting, 1837-1901. National Gallery of Art, 1996. ISBN 0810963426.
