= Princess Victoria of Saxe-Coburg and Gotha =

Princess Victoria
- Duchess of Nemours
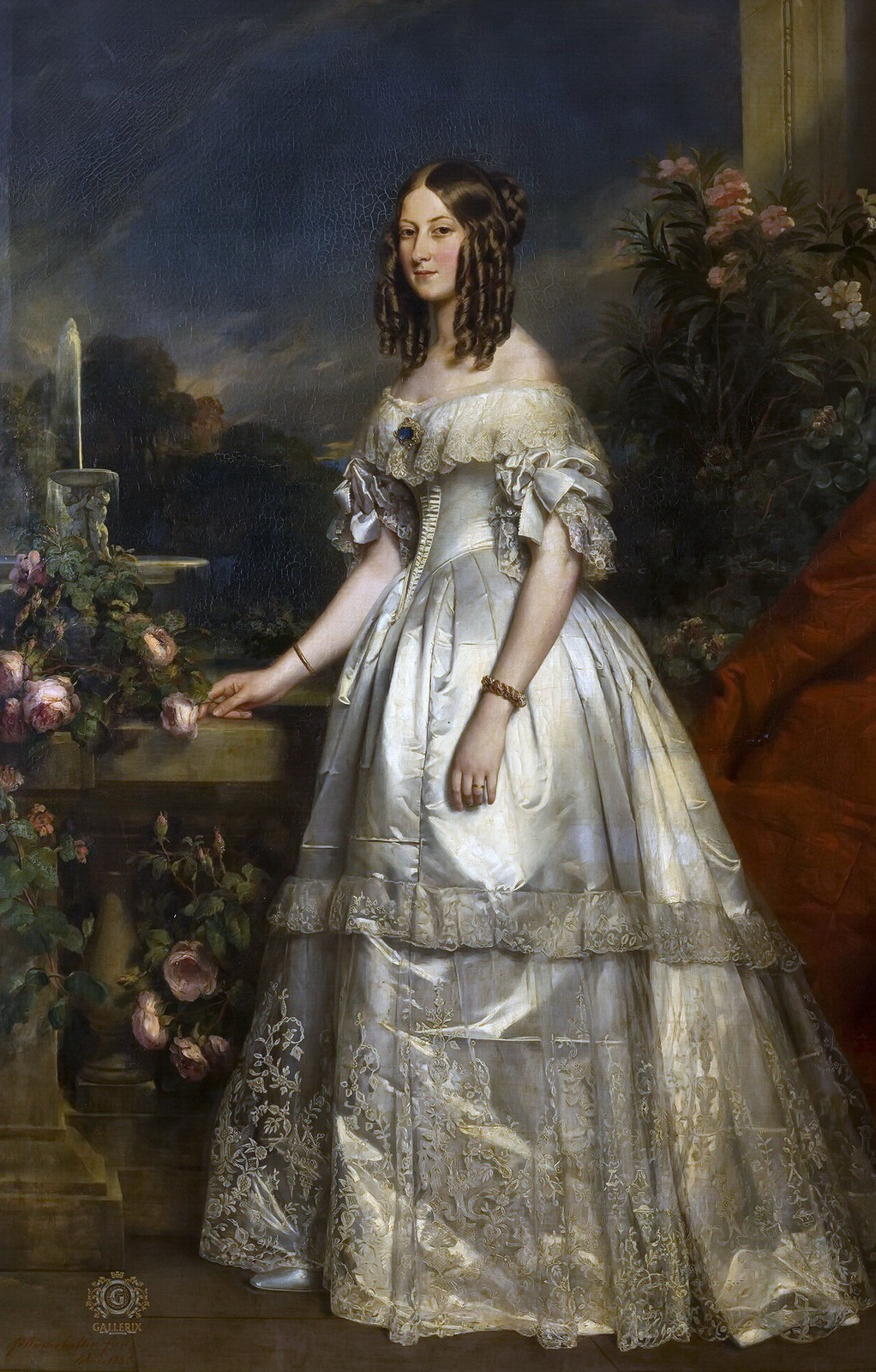
- Portrait of the Duchess of Nemours by Franz Xaver Winterhalter, c. 1840
- Born: 14 February 1822; Vienna, Austria
- Died: 10 November 1857 (aged 35); Claremont House, Surrey, England
- Burial: Chapelle royale de Dreux
- Spouse: Prince Louis, Duke of Nemours (m. 1840)
- Issue: Prince Gaston, Count of Eu; Ferdinand Philippe, Duke of Alençon; Marguerite, Princess Władysław Czartoryski; Princess Blanche
Names
- English: Victoria Frances Antonia Juliana Louise; French: Victoire Françoise Antoinette Julianne Louise; German: Viktoria Franziska Antonia Juliane Luise
- House: Saxe-Coburg-Gotha-Koháry
- Father: Ferdinand, Prince of Saxe-Coburg and Gotha-Koháry
- Mother: Princess Mária Antónia Koháry de Csábrág et Szitnya

Princess Victoria of Saxe-Coburg and Gotha (Victoria Franziska Antonia Juliane Luise; 14 February 1822 – 10 November 1857) was the daughter of Ferdinand, Prince of Saxe-Coburg and Gotha-Koháry, and Princess Mária Antónia Koháry de Csábrág et Szitnya. Her father was the second son of Francis, Duke of Saxe-Coburg-Saalfeld, and Countess Augusta Reuss of Ebersdorf. Through her father, she was the first cousin of Queen Victoria as the Queen's mother was her aunt.

== Biography ==
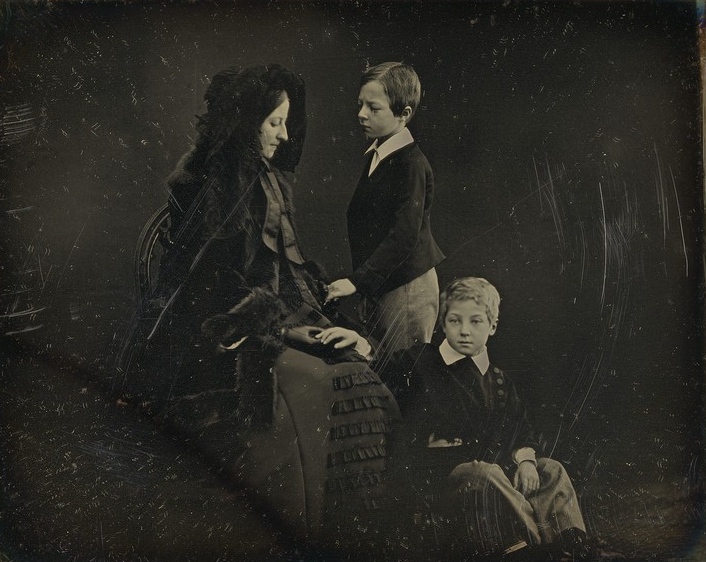
Duchess Victoria of Nemours with her two sons (Gaston and Ferdinand), 1852

Victoria was born as the only daughter to Prince Ferdinand of Saxe-Coburg and Gotha and Princess Mária Antónia Koháry de Csábrág et Szitnya. Her mother was the daughter and heiress of Ferenc József, Prince Koháry de Csábrág et Szitnya. When Antonia's father died in 1826, she inherited his estates in Slovakia and Hungary. Victoria's elder brother was King Ferdinand II of Portugal and first cousins included British Queen Victoria, her husband Prince Albert of Saxe-Coburg and Gotha as well as Belgian King Leopold II and his sister, Empress Carlota of Mexico.

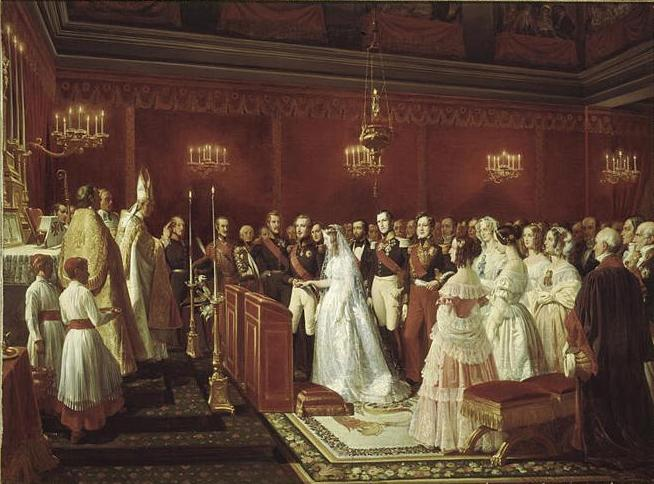
The wedding at Saint-Cloud in 1840.

On 27 April 1840, at the Château de Saint-Cloud, she married Louis d'Orléans, known since birth as the Duke of Nemours, second son of King Louis Philippe of France. After the Revolution of 1848 in France, the royal family went into exile and settled in England. In England Victoria spent a lot of time with her cousin, Queen Victoria, with whom she was extraordinarily close, and she was a frequent guest at Osbourne House.

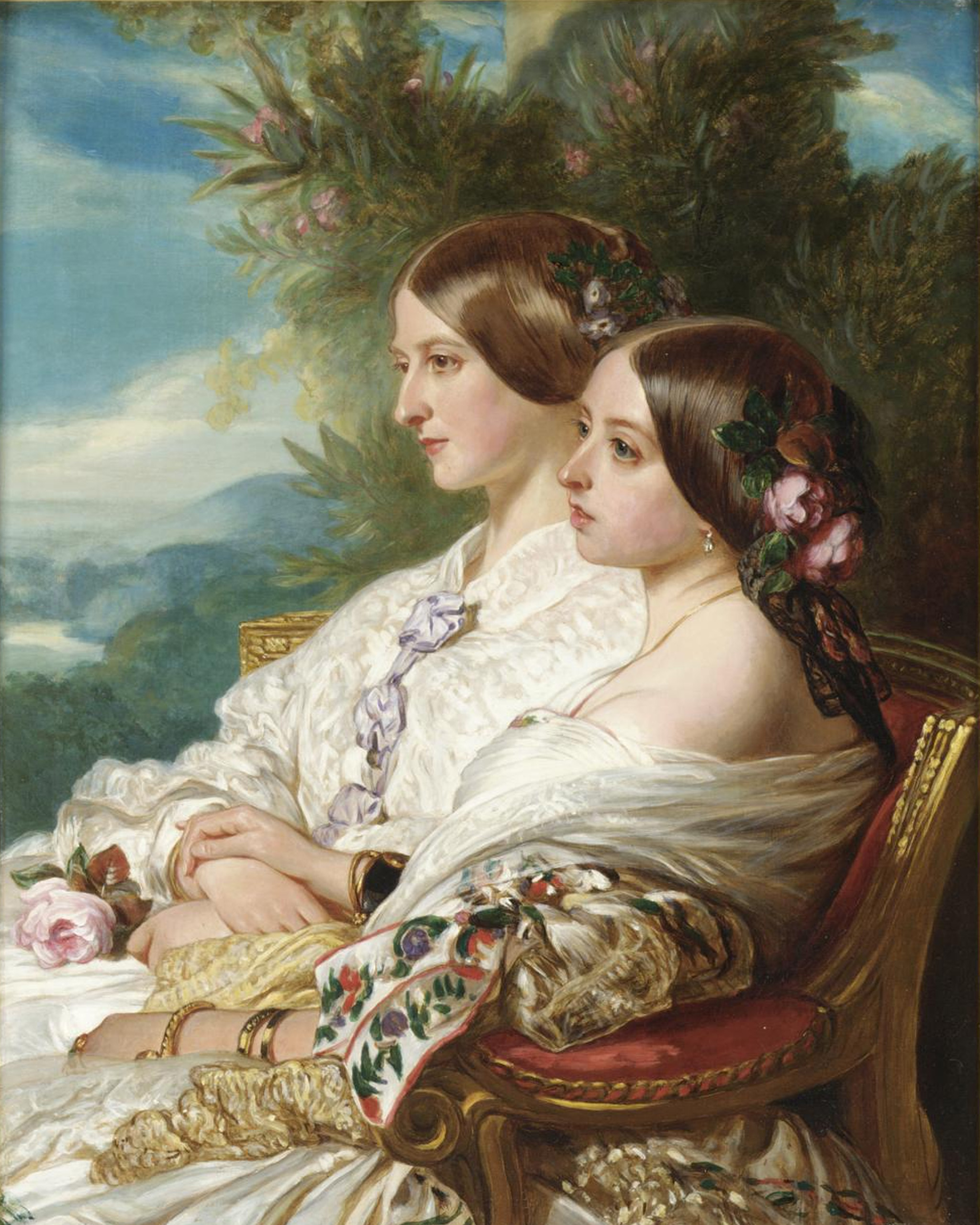
The Cousins by Franz Xaver Winterhalter, 1852. Duchess Victoria together with her cousin, Queen Victoria

The Duke and Duchess of Nemours had four children, all of them having issue except the last, Blanche, who never married. Victoria was outlived by her husband, who died in 1896.

In late 1857, Victoria died after giving birth to her daughter Blanche at Claremont and was buried at the Chapel of Saint Charles Borromeo in Weybridge. Queen Victoria wrote of this tragedy: "It seems too dreadful almost to believe it, – too hard to bear". Her remains were transferred to the Royal Chapel of Dreux, the traditional burial place of the House of Orléans, in 1979.

== Issue ==
- Louis Philippe Marie Ferdinand Gaston d'Orléans, Count of Eu (28 April 1842 – 28 August 1922), who married Isabella, eldest daughter and heiress of Dom Pedro II of Brazil;
- Ferdinand Philippe Marie d'Orléans, Duke of Alençon (12 July 1844 – 29 June 1910), who married Duchess Sophie Charlotte in Bavaria (1847–1897), sister of Elisabeth, Empress of Austria, and who had been for a time engaged to Ludwig II of Bavaria;
- Marguerite Adélaïde Marie d'Orléans (1846–1893), who married Prince Ladislaus Czartoryski;
- Blanche Marie Amelie Caroline Louise Victoire d'Orléans (28 October 1857 – 4 February 1932).

== Honours ==
- Kingdom of Portugal: Dame of the Order of Queen Saint Isabel, 22 July 1839
- Kingdom of Spain: Dame of the Order of Queen Maria Luisa, 6 September 1845

== Ancestry ==
Ancestors of Princess Victoria of Saxe-Coburg and Gotha

8. Ernest Frederick, Duke of Saxe-Coburg-Saalfeld
4. Francis, Duke of Saxe-Coburg-Saalfeld
9. Duchess Sophie Antoinette of Brunswick-Wolfenbüttel
2. Prince Ferdinand of Saxe-Coburg and Gotha
10. Heinrich XXIV, Count Reuss of Ebersdorf
5. Countess Augusta Reuss of Ebersdorf
11. Countess Karoline Ernestine of Erbach-Schönberg
1. Princess Victoria of Saxe-Coburg and Gotha
12. Ignác József, Count Koháry de Csábrág et Szitnya
6. Ferenc József, Prince Koháry de Csábrág et Szitnya
13. Countess Maria Gabriella Cavriani
3. Princess Mária Antónia Koháry de Csábrág et Szitnya
14. Count Georg Christian von Waldstein zu Wartenberg
7. Countess Maria Antonia von Waldstein zu Wartenberg
15. Countess Elisabeth Ulfeldt
