= Prince Louis, Duke of Nemours =

French prince (1814–1896)

Prince Louis
- Duke of Nemours
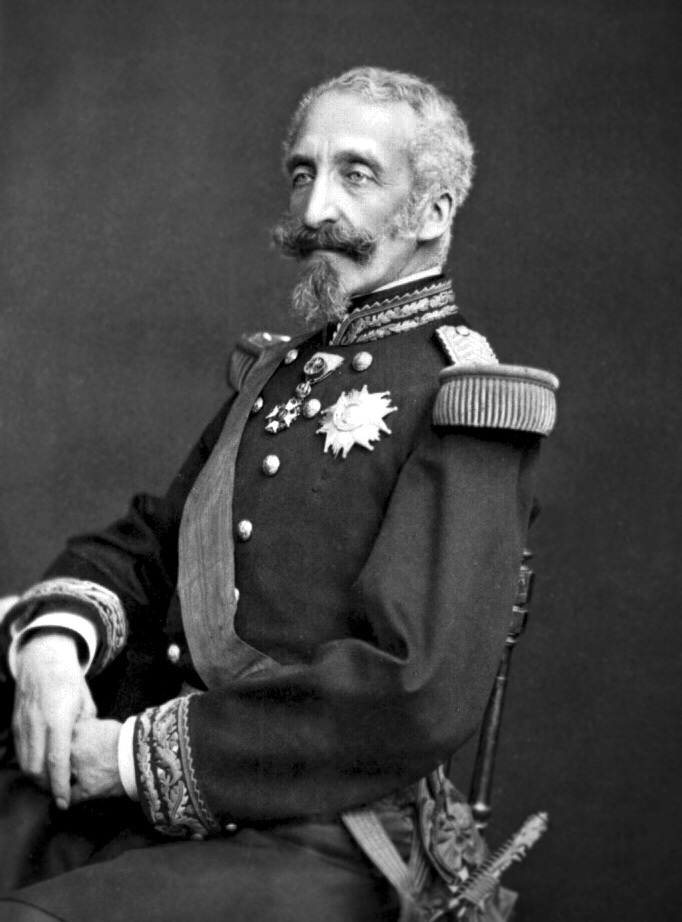
- Born: 25 October 1814; Palais Royal, Paris, France
- Died: 26 June 1896 (aged 81); Versailles, France
- Burial: Chapelle royale de Dreux
- Spouse: Princess Victoria of Saxe-Coburg and Gotha (m. 1840; died 1857)
- Issue Detail: Prince Gaston, Count of Eu; Prince Ferdinand, Duke of Alençon; Marguerite, Princess Czartoryska; Princess Blanche
Names
- Louis Charles Philippe Raphaël d'Orléans
- House: Orléans
- Father: Louis Philippe I
- Mother: Maria Amalia of Naples and Sicily

Prince Louis of Orléans, Duke of Nemours (Louis Charles Philippe Raphaël d'Orléans; 25 October 1814 – 26 June 1896) was the second son of King Louis-Philippe I of France and Maria Amalia of Naples and Sicily.

== Life ==
=== Childhood ===
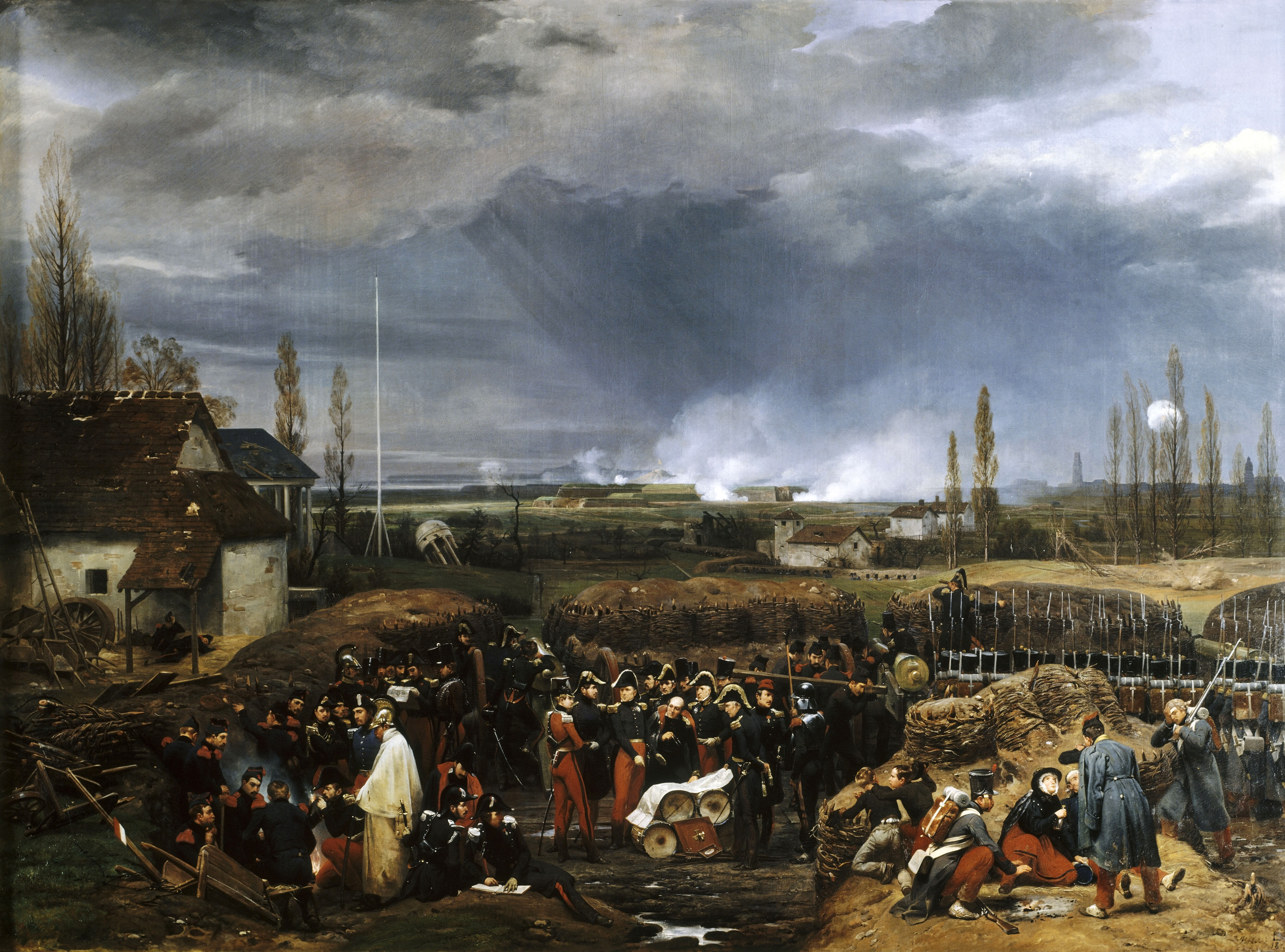
The Siege of Antwerp by Horace Vernet. Nemours shown with his brother Orléans and the French commander Étienne Maurice Gérard

He was born at the Palais Royal, in Paris. At twelve years of age, he was nominated colonel of the First Regiment of Chasseurs, and in 1830 entered the Chambre des Pairs.

As early as 1825, while revolutionaries were still engaged in the Greek War of Independence, attempting to establish a Kingdom of Greece (which transpired with the London Conference of 1832), Louis' name was mentioned as a possible candidate as the first modern King of Greece. In February 1831, five months before revolutionaries succeeded in the Belgian Revolution, which established the Kingdom of Belgium, Louis was nominated to be the first King of the Belgians; international considerations deterred Louis-Philippe from accepting the honour for his son. Prince Louis did accompany the French Armée du Nord that entered Belgium to support its separation from the United Kingdom of the Netherlands; there he took part in the Siege of Antwerp (1832).

Louis accompanied the Algerian expedition against the town of Constantine in the autumn of 1836, and in a second expedition (1837) he was entrusted with the command of a brigade and with the direction of the siege operations at Constantine. General Damrémont was killed at his side on 12 October, and Constantine was taken by assault on the 13th.

He sailed a third time for Algeria in 1841, and served under General Bugeaud, taking part in the expedition to get provisions to Médéa on 29 April, and in sharp fighting near Miliana on 3 to 5 May. In the expedition against the fortified town of Takdempt, Louis commanded the 1st Infantry Division. On his return to France, he became commandant of the camp of Compiègne.

Louis was also dispatched on missions of courtesy to England in 1835, in 1838 and in 1845, and to Berlin and Vienna in 1836.

=== Marriage ===
On 26 April 1840, he married Princess Victoria of Saxe-Coburg and Gotha at the Château de Saint-Cloud. The occasion of his marriage in 1840 with Victoria was marked by a check to Louis-Philippe's government in the form of a refusal to bestow the marriage dowry proposed by Adolphe Thiers in the Chamber of Deputies.

The death of his elder brother, Ferdinand, Duke of Orleans, in 1842 gave him a position of greater importance as the natural regent in the case of the accession of his nephew, the young Count of Paris. His reserve, and dislike of public functions, with a certain haughtiness of manner, however, made him unpopular.

On the outbreak of the revolution of 1848 he held the Tuileries long enough to cover the king's retreat, but refrained from initiating active measures against the mob. He followed his sister-in-law, Hélène, Duchesse d'Orléans, and her two sons to the chamber of deputies, but was separated from them by the rioters, and only escaped finally by disguising himself in the uniform of a national guard.

=== Exile and return to France ===
He embarked for England, where he settled with his parents at Claremont. His chief aim during his exile, especially after his father's death, was a reconciliation between the two branches of the house of Bourbon, as indispensable to the re-establishment of the French monarchy in any form. These wishes were frustrated on the one hand by the attitude of the comte de Chambord, and on the other by the determination of the Duchess of Orleans to maintain the pretensions of the Count of Paris. Nemours was prepared to go further than the other princes of his family in accepting the principles of the legitimists.

Lengthy negotiations ended in 1857 with a letter, written by Nemours, as he subsequently explained, at the dictation of his brother, François, prince de Joinville, in which he insisted that Chambord should express his adherence to the tricolour flag and to the principles of constitutional government. In 1871 the Orléans princes renewed their professions of allegiance to the senior branch of their house, but they were not consulted when the count of Chambord came to Paris in 1873, and their political differences remained until his death in 1883.

Nemours lived at Bushy House after the death in 1866 of Queen Marie Amélie, widow of Louis Philippe. In 1871 the exile imposed on the French princes was withdrawn, but he only transferred his establishment to Paris after their disabilities were also removed. In March 1872 he was restored to his rank in the army as general of division, and placed in the first section of the general staff. After his retirement from the active list he continued to act as president of the Red Cross Society until 1886, when new decrees against the princes of the blood led to his withdrawal from Parisian society.

During the presidency of Marshal MacMahon, he appeared from time to time at the Elysée. He died at Versailles on 26 June 1896 at the age of 81, the duchess having died at Claremont on 10 November 1857. He outlived all of his siblings apart from Princess Clémentine, the Duke of Aumale and the Prince of Joinville.

== Issue ==
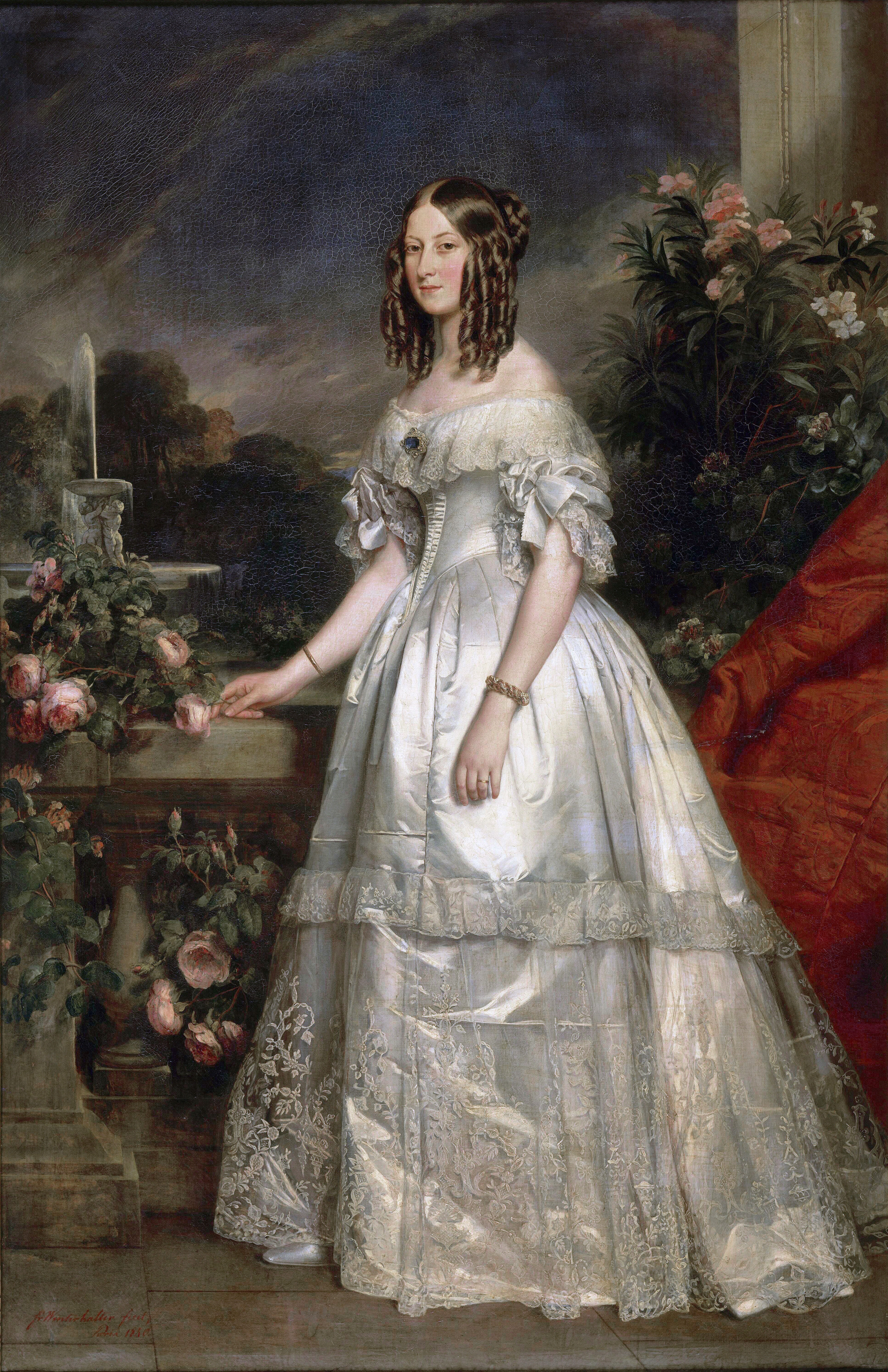
Portrait of the Duchess of Nemours by Franz Xaver Winterhalter, 1840. Painted the year of their marriage, the couple has four children together

- Prince Louis Philippe Marie Ferdinand Gaston of Orléans, Count of Eu (28 April 1842 – 28 August 1922), who married Isabel, Princess Imperial of Brazil, eldest daughter and heiress of Emperor Pedro II of Brazil;
- Prince Ferdinand Philippe Marie of Orléans, Duke of Alençon (12 July 1844 – 29 June 1910), who married Duchess Sophie Charlotte in Bavaria (1847–1897), sister of Elizabeth, Empress of Austria ("Sisi"), and who had been for a time engaged to Ludwig II of Bavaria;
- Princess Marguerite Adélaïde Marie of Orléans (1846–1893), who married Prince Ladislaus Czartoryski;
- Princess Blanche Marie Amélie Caroline Louise Victoire of Orléans (28 October 1857 – 4 February 1932).

== Honours ==
- Kingdom of France:
  - Knight of the Holy Spirit, 19 February 1829
  - Knight of St. Michael, 19 February 1829
  - Grand Cross of the Legion of Honour, 3 August 1830
- Belgium: Grand Cordon of the Order of Leopold, 10 March 1833
- Empire of Brazil: Grand Cross of the Order of Pedro I
- (Saxe-Coburg and Gotha) (Duchy of Saxe-Altenburg) (Saxe-Meiningen) Ernestine duchies: Grand Cross of the Saxe-Ernestine House Order, March 1840
- Spain: Knight of the Golden Fleece, 1 October 1843
- Kingdom of Bavaria: Knight of St. Hubert, 1868
- Kingdom of Portugal: Grand Cross of the Tower and Sword

== Ancestors ==
Ancestors of Prince Louis, Duke of Nemours

8. Louis Philippe I, Duke of Orléans
4. Louis Philippe II, Duke of Orléans
9. Louise Henriette de Bourbon
2. Louis Philippe I of France
10. Louis Jean Marie, Duke of Penthièvre
5. Louise Marie Adélaïde de Bourbon
11. Maria Teresa Felicitas d'Este
1. Prince Louis, Duke of Nemours
12. Charles III of Spain
6. Ferdinand I of the Two Sicilies
13. Maria Amalia of Saxony
3. Maria Amalia of Naples and Sicily
14. Francis I, Holy Roman Emperor
7. Maria Carolina of Austria
15. Maria Theresa of Austria
