= Princess Elisabeth Maria of Bavaria =

Bavarian princess and Countess of Kageneck

- Countess of Kageneck
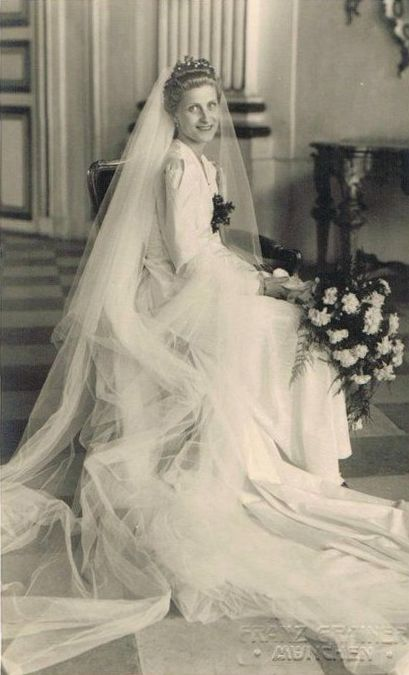
- Elisabeth Maria, circa 1939
- Born: October 10, 1913; Munich, Kingdom of Bavaria, German Empire
- Died: March 3, 2005 (aged 91); Munich, Germany
- Spouse: Franz Joseph Graf von Kageneck (m. 1939; died 1941) Ernst Küstner (m. 1944; div. 1953)
- Issue: Hubertus Graf von Kageneck; Michael Graf von Kageneck; Peter Graf von Kageneck; Maria Anna Küstner; Felicitas Küstner; Christina Kustner; Gabriele Kustner
Names
- Elisabeth Maria Anna Henriette Josepha Sophie Amalia Ferdinanda Ludovika Antonia Theresia Kreszentia Ala Ghislane von Bayern
- House: House of Wittelsbach
- Father: Prince Alfons of Bavaria
- Mother: Princess Louise of Orléans

Princess Elisabeth Maria of Bavaria (10 October 1913 – 3 March 2005) was a member of the House of Wittelsbach.

== Early life ==
She was born on 10 October 1913 in Munich, Germany, as the only daughter of Prince Alfons of Bavaria and Princess Louise of Orléans. Her early life was shaped by the institutional privileges of the House of Wittelsbach until the collapse of the Bavarian monarchy during the German Revolution of 1918. Despite the loss of formal royal standing, she spent her youth being educated within the traditional social expectations of the former ruling dynasty alongside her elder brother, Prince Joseph Clemens.

== Marriage and later life ==
On 6 May 1939, Elisabeth married her first husband, Count Franz Joseph von Kageneck (1915–1941), at Nymphenburg Palace in Munich. This marriage produced three children:

- Hubertus Graf von Kageneck (born 1940), who married four times and had no issue .
- Michael Graf von Kageneck (1941–2012), who married three times and had issue.
- Peter Graf von Kageneck (1941–2009), who married Brigitte von Sievers and had issue.

Count Franz Joseph was killed in action on the Eastern Front during World War II in December 1941.

On 9 May 1944, Elisabeth Maria contracted a second marriage with Ernst Küstner (1920-2008), in a civil ceremony in Munich. The second marriage produced four children, the first of whom was born prior to the legalization of the marriage:

- Maria Anna Küstner (born 1943).
- Felicitas Küstner (born 1945).
- Christina Kustner (born 1946).
- Gabriele Kustner (born 1948).

This marriage was formally dissolved by a civil divorce decree in 1953. She died on 3 March 2005 in Munich. Her remains were interred in the historic Wittelsbach family crypt located at the St. Michael Church.

== Ancestry ==
Ancestors of Princess Elisabeth Maria of Bavaria

8. Ludwig I of Bavaria
4. Prince Adalbert of Bavaria
9. Princess Therese of Saxe-Hildburghausen
2. Prince Alfons of Bavaria
10. Infante Francisco de Paula of Spain
5. Infanta Amalia of Spain
11. Princess Luisa Carlotta of the Two Sicilies
1. Princess Elisabeth Maria of Bavaria
12. Prince Louis, Duke of Nemours
6. Prince Ferdinand, Duke of Alençon
13. Princess Victoria of Saxe-Coburg and Gotha
3. Princess Louise of Orléans
14. Duke Maximilian Joseph in Bavaria
7. Duchess Sophie Charlotte in Bavaria
15. Princess Ludovika of Bavaria
