= Prince Joseph Clemens of Bavaria =

Member of the Bavarian Royal House of Wittelsbach

Prince Joseph Clemens
- Joseph Clemens in 1918
- Born: 25 May 1902; Munich, Kingdom of Bavaria, German Empire (now Germany)
- Died: 8 January 1990 (aged 87); Munich, Bavaria, West Germany
- Burial: Michaelskirche, Munich
Names
- German: Joseph Clemens Maria Ferdinand Ludwig Anton Augustin Alphons Alta Franz von Sales Philipp Nerius
- House: Wittelsbach
- Father: Prince Alfons of Bavaria
- Mother: Princess Louise of Orléans

Prince Joseph Clemens of Bavaria (German: Joseph Clemens Maria Ferdinand Ludwig Anton Augustin Alphons Alta Franz von Sales Philipp Nerius Prinz von Bayern) (25 May 1902 – 8 January 1990) was a member of the Bavarian Royal House of Wittelsbach and a leading German art historian.

== Early life ==
Joseph Clemens was born in Munich, Kingdom of Bavaria. He was the first child and only son of Prince Alfons of Bavaria and his wife Princess Louise Victoire d'Orléans-Alençon.

== Later life ==
The prince studied Art History and later became one of the leading Art Historians in Germany and Europe. He was also a Grand Prior of the Bavarian Royal Order of Saint George for the Defense of the Immaculate Conception and Knight of the Order of Saint Hubert.

He never married and had no known children.

== Ancestry ==
Ancestors of Prince Joseph Clemens of Bavaria

8. Ludwig I of Bavaria
4. Prince Adalbert of Bavaria
9. Princess Therese of Saxe-Hildburghausen
2. Prince Alfons of Bavaria
10. Infante Francisco de Paula of Spain
5. Infanta Amalia of Spain
11. Princess Luisa Carlotta of the Two Sicilies
1. Prince Joseph Clemens of Bavaria
12. Prince Louis, Duke of Nemours
6. Prince Ferdinand, Duke of Alençon
13. Princess Victoria of Saxe-Coburg and Gotha
3. Princess Louise of Orléans
14. Duke Maximilian Joseph in Bavaria
7. Duchess Sophie Charlotte in Bavaria
15. Princess Ludovika of Bavaria
