= Louise d'Orléans (1869–1952) =

French princess of the House of Orléans

Princess Louise
- Princess Alfons of Bavaria
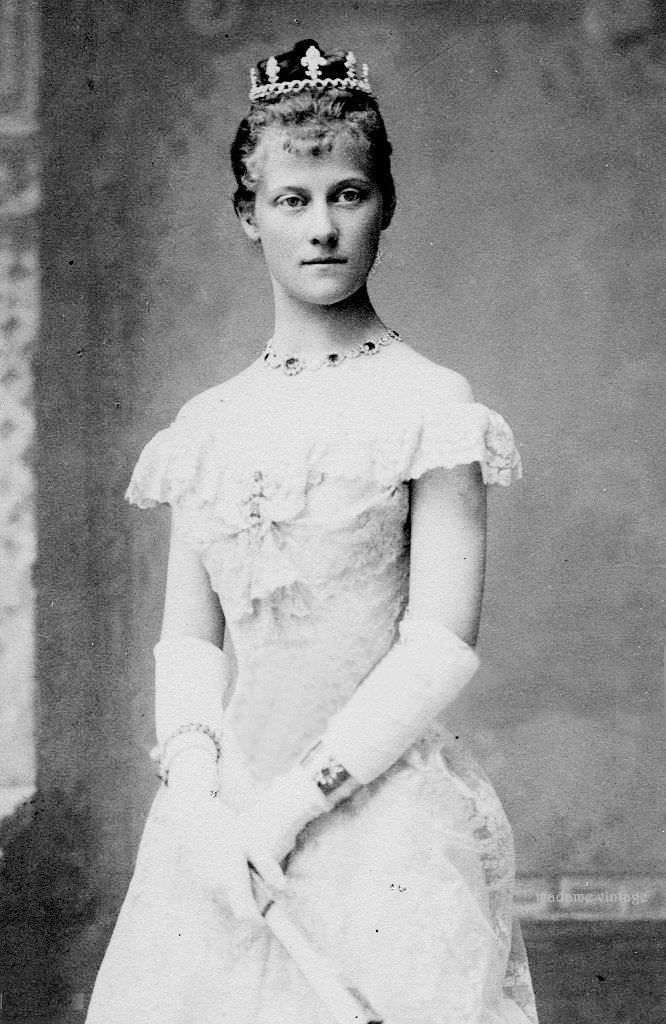
- Louise in the 1890s
- Born: 19 July 1869; Bushy House, Teddington, England
- Died: 4 February 1952 (aged 82); Munich, Germany
- Spouse: Prince Alfons of Bavaria (m. 1891; died 1933)
- Issue: Prince Joseph Clemens; Princess Elisabeth Maria
Names
- French: Louise Victoire Marie Amélie Sophie
- House: Orléans
- Father: Prince Ferdinand, Duke of Alençon
- Mother: Sophie Charlotte of Bavaria

Princess Louise d'Orléans (Louise Victoire Marie Amélie Sophie; 19 July 1869 – 4 February 1952) was a French princess of the House of Orléans and a member of the Royal Family of Bavaria. Throughout her life, Louise remained very close to her first cousin, Archduchess Marie Valerie of Austria.

== Early life and family ==
Princess Louise of Orléans was born at Bushy House, Teddington, England, in 1869. She was the daughter of the French prince Ferdinand, Duke of Alençon, and his wife Duchess Sophie Charlotte in Bavaria. Louise's mother was a sister of Empress Elisabeth of Austria ("Sisi") and Queen Marie of the Two Sicilies, the heroine of Gaeta. Her paternal grandparents were Prince Louis, Duke of Nemours, the second son of Louis-Philippe I, King of the French; and Princess Victoria of Saxe-Coburg and Gotha, a first cousin of Queen Victoria. Louise had a younger brother, Prince Emmanuel, Duke of Vendôme.

== Marriage ==
On 15 April 1891 at Schloss Nymphenburg, Louise married her second cousin Prince Alfons of Bavaria. He was the second son of Prince Adalbert of Bavaria and his wife, Amelia de Bourbon.

They had two children:

- Prince Joseph Clemens of Bavaria (1902–1990), who never married;
- Princess Elisabeth Maria of Bavaria (1913–2005), who married firstly Count Franz Josef von Kageneck (1915–1941), then Ernst Küstner (1920)

In Paris on 4 May 1897, her mother, the famed duchesse d'Alençon, died in a fire at a charity bazaar (the Bazar de la Charité); she had refused rescue attempts, insisting that the girls working with her at the bazaar be saved first.

Louise died in 1952 in Munich.

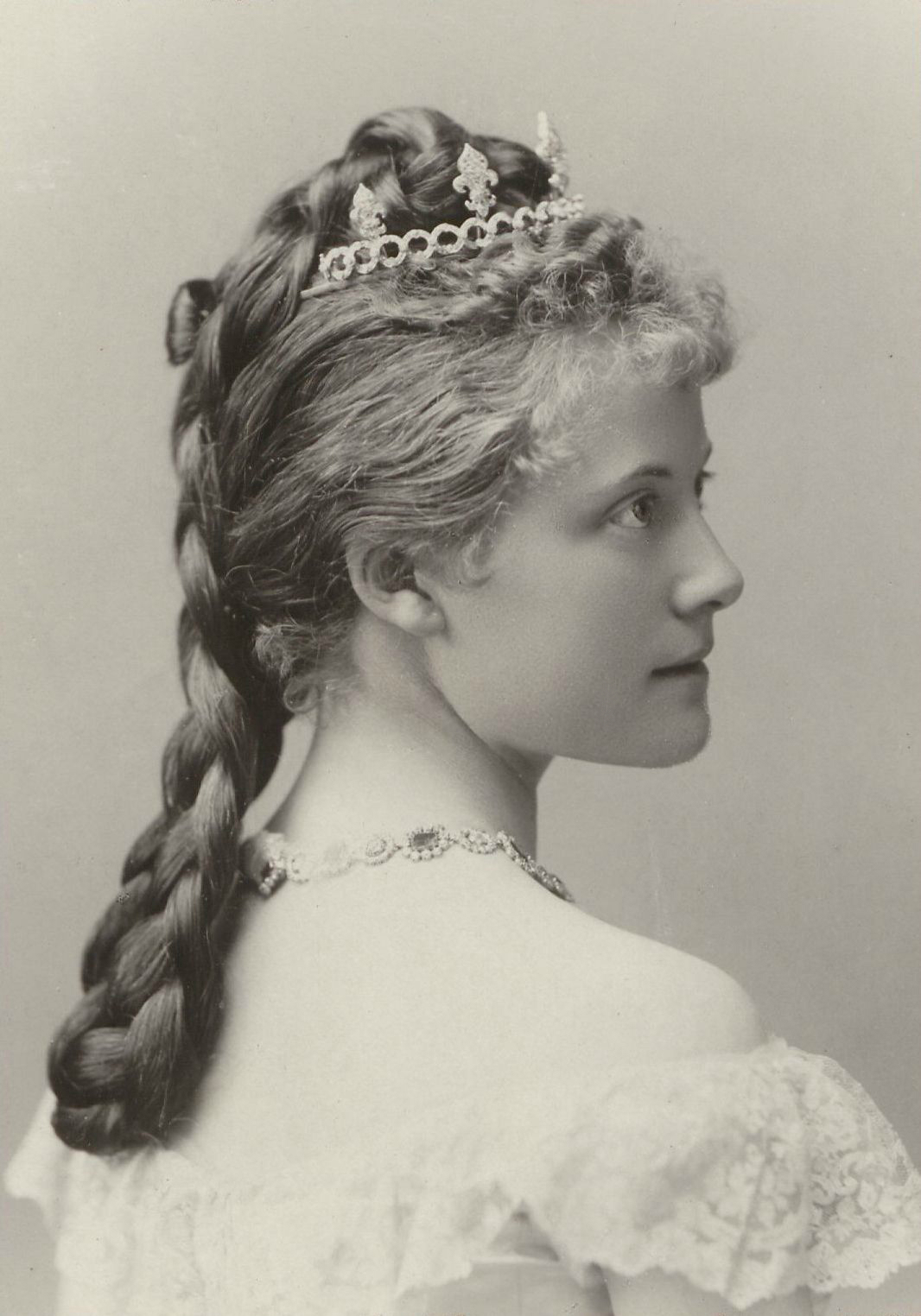
1892

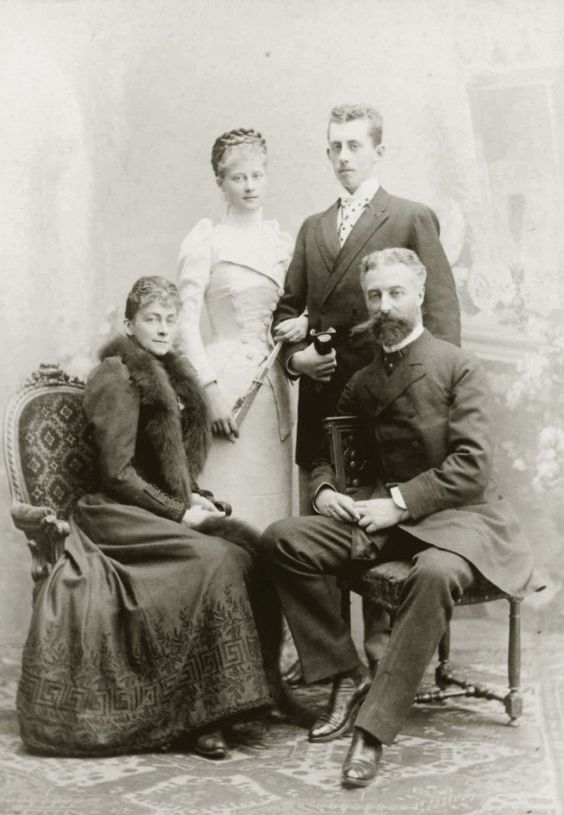
Princess Louise and her family, 1890s

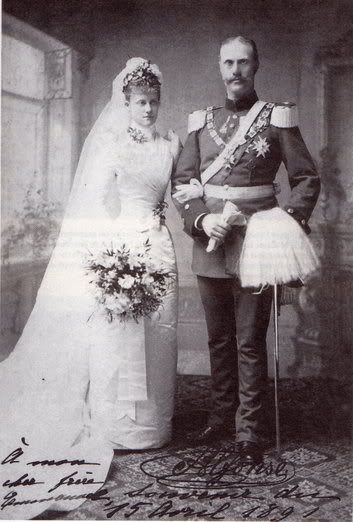
Prince and Princess Alfons of Bavaria

Louise's children Joseph and Elisabeth

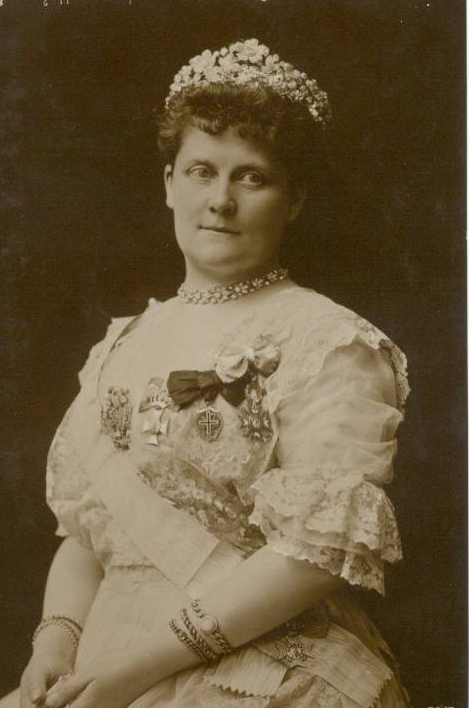
Princess Louise in middle age

== Ancestry ==
Ancestors of Louise d'Orléans (1869–1952)

8. Louis Philippe I of France
4. Prince Louis, Duke of Nemours
9. Princess Maria Amalia of Naples and Sicily
2. Prince Ferdinand, Duke of Alençon
10. Prince Ferdinand of Saxe-Coburg and Gotha
5. Princess Victoria of Saxe-Coburg and Gotha
11. Princess Maria Antonia Koháry of Csábrág and Szitnya
1. Princess Louise of Orléans
12. Duke Pius August in Bavaria
6. Duke Maximilian Joseph in Bavaria
13. Princess Amélie Louise of Arenberg
3. Duchess Sophie Charlotte in Bavaria
14. Maximilian I Joseph of Bavaria
7. Princess Ludovika of Bavaria
15. Princess Caroline of Baden
