= Hôpital Saint-Louis =

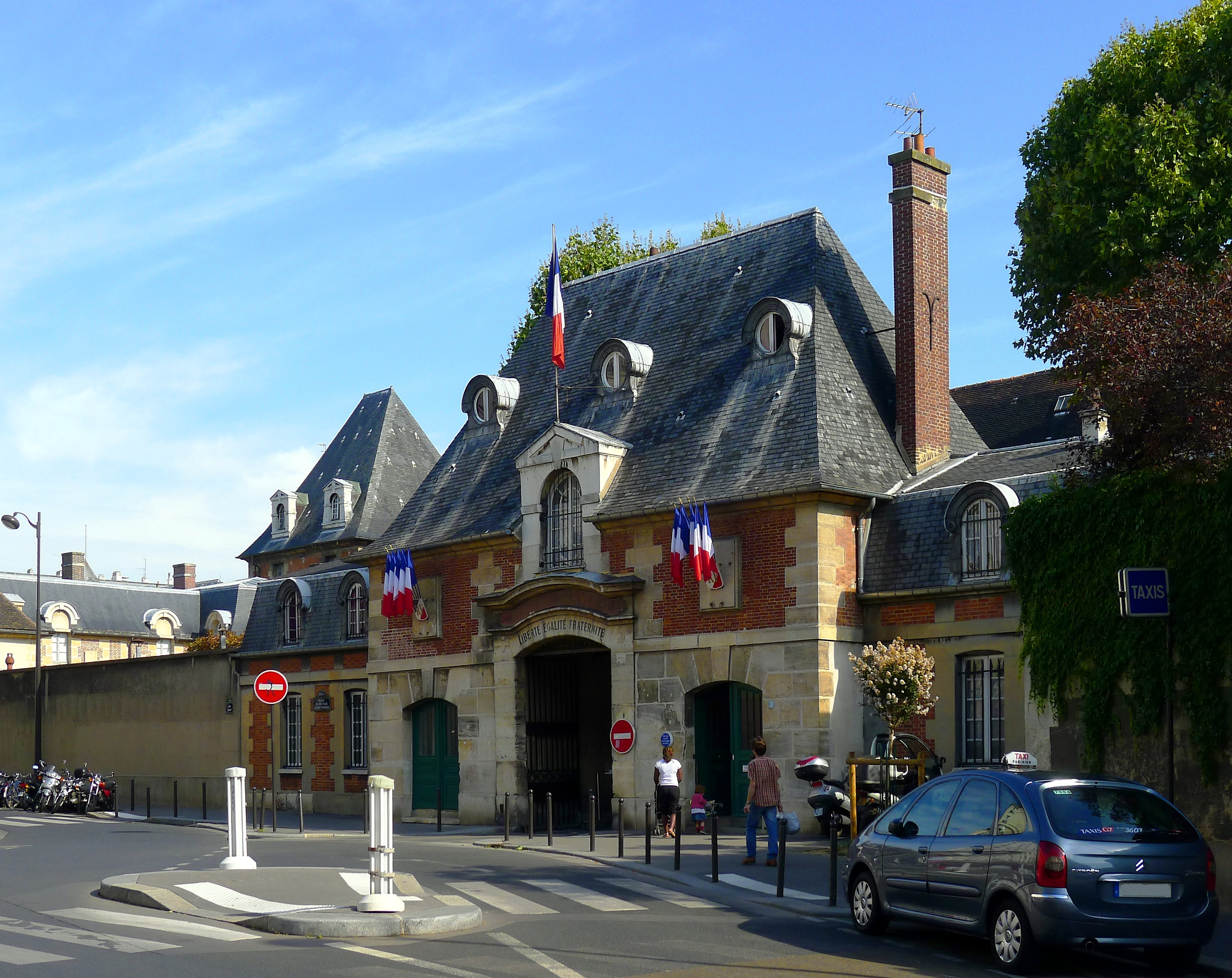
- Hôpital Saint-Louis

Geography
- Location: 1 avenue Claude-Vellefaux, in the 10th arrondissement, Paris, France
- Coordinates: 48°52′29″N 02°22′06″E

History
- Opened: 1661

Links
- Website: hopital-saintlouis.aphp.fr
- Lists: Hospitals in France

Hôpital Saint-Louis (French pronunciation: [opital sɛ̃ lwi]) is a hospital in Paris, France. It was built in 1611 by architect Claude Vellefaux at the request of Henry IV of France. It is part of the Assistance publique - Hôpitaux de Paris hospital system, and it is located at 1 avenue Claude-Vellefaux, in the 10th arrondissement near the metro station Goncourt.

It was founded by King Henry IV (1553–1610) (King of France and Navarre) on May 17, 1607 to relieve the Hôtel-Dieu de Paris during the plague. It was named St. Louis in memory of Louis IX, who died of the dysentery that devastated Tunis in 1270.

Today, Hôpital Saint-Louis uses its historical premises (parts of which are classified as historical monuments) for administrative functions. Following the 1980s new modern additions were made to house the current hospital and teaching hospital. Its primary specialties are dermatology and hematology, as well as oncology. The dermatology library was founded by Dr Henri Feulard. The hospital employs 2,500 people, one thousand of whom are in the medical profession. It houses the INSERM Institute of Research on Skin and the René Touraine Foundation.

The south-west entrance to the hospital, located at the intersection of rue Bichat and avenue Richerand, is popularly known as the entrance to the police station in the hit French detective television series Navarro.

== History ==
Hôpital Saint-Louis was built at the beginning of the 17th century on the orders of King Henry IV of France, who signed an edict founding the hospital on May 17, 1607. It was initially intended to only serve as a temporary hospital during epidemic to quarantine afflicted Parisians who could be contagious. It was also situated just outside the Wall of Charles V beyond Porte du Temple. It was constructed in the proximity of the Gibbet of Montfaucon, as seen by an engraving of the hospital by Claude Chastillon.

Construction was fairly quick, and was carried out using plans by Claude Vellfaux or Claude Chastillon, with work starting on the chapel. On Friday, July 13, 1607, the king laid the first stone, and Antoine Le Mercier lead the construction efforts.

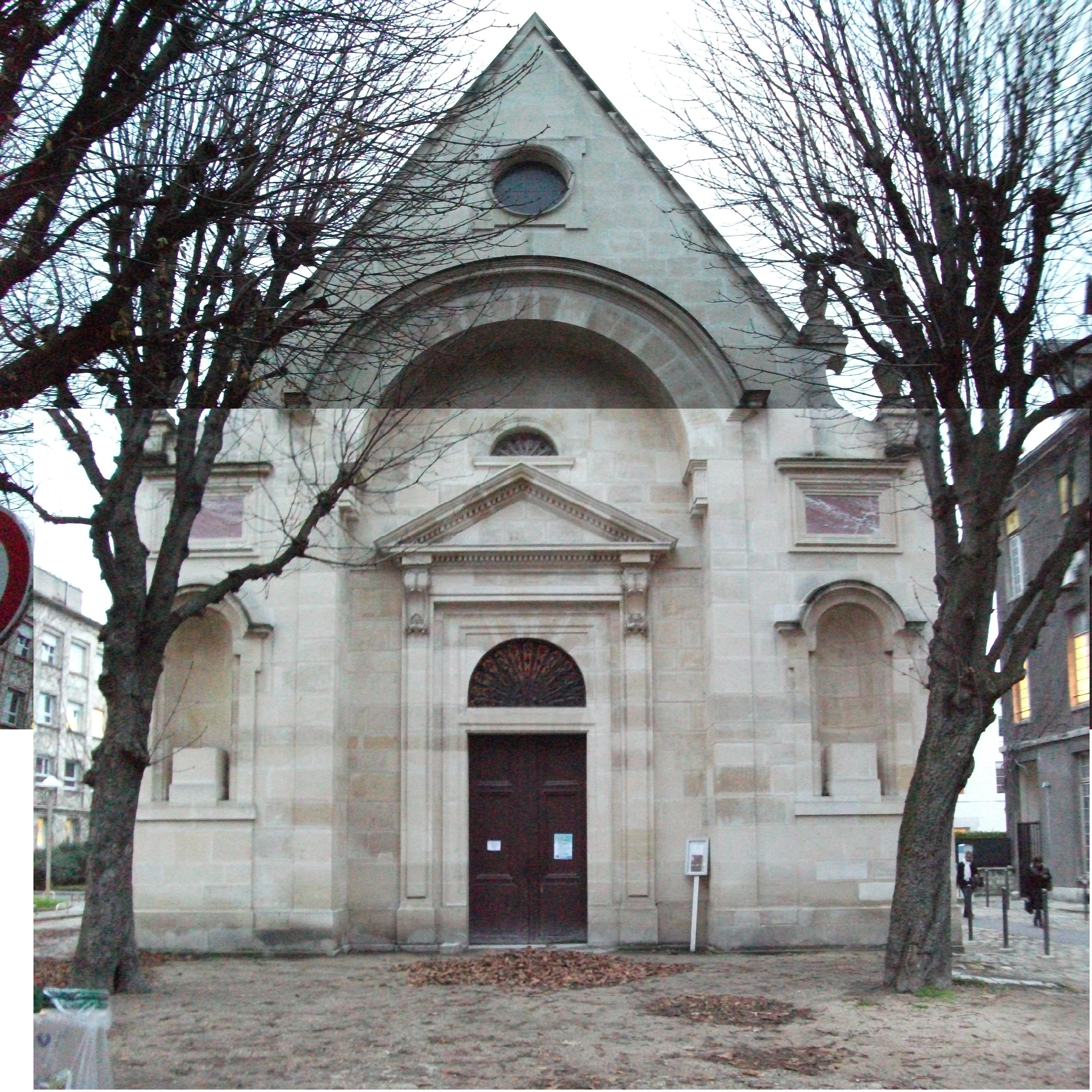
Entrance to the hospital on rue Juliette-Dodu

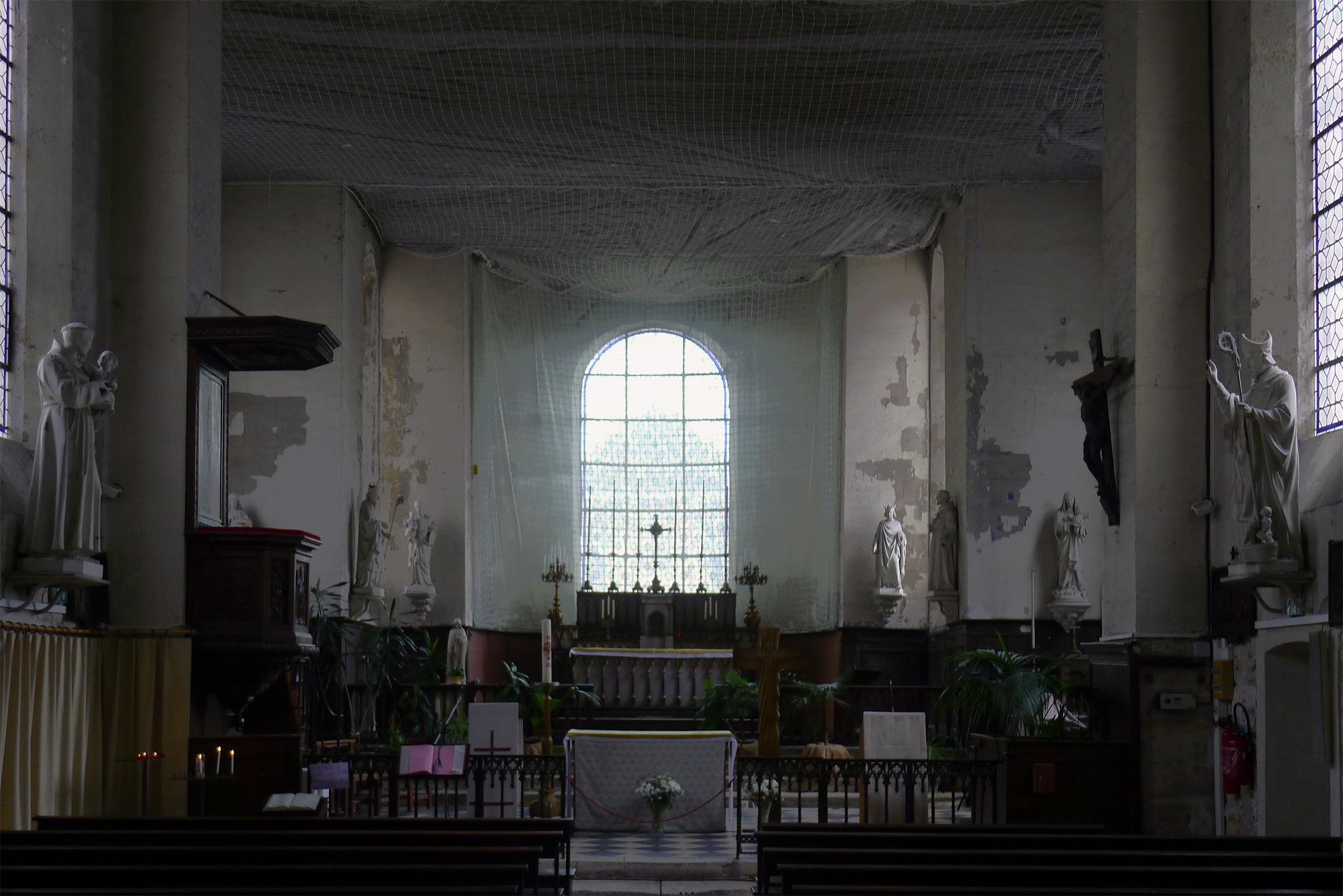
Interior of the chapel

== Wax museum ==
The hospital played an important role in the study of dermatology since the 19th century and holds a wax museum of dermatological diseases.
