= Henri Feulard =

French dermatologist (1858–1897)

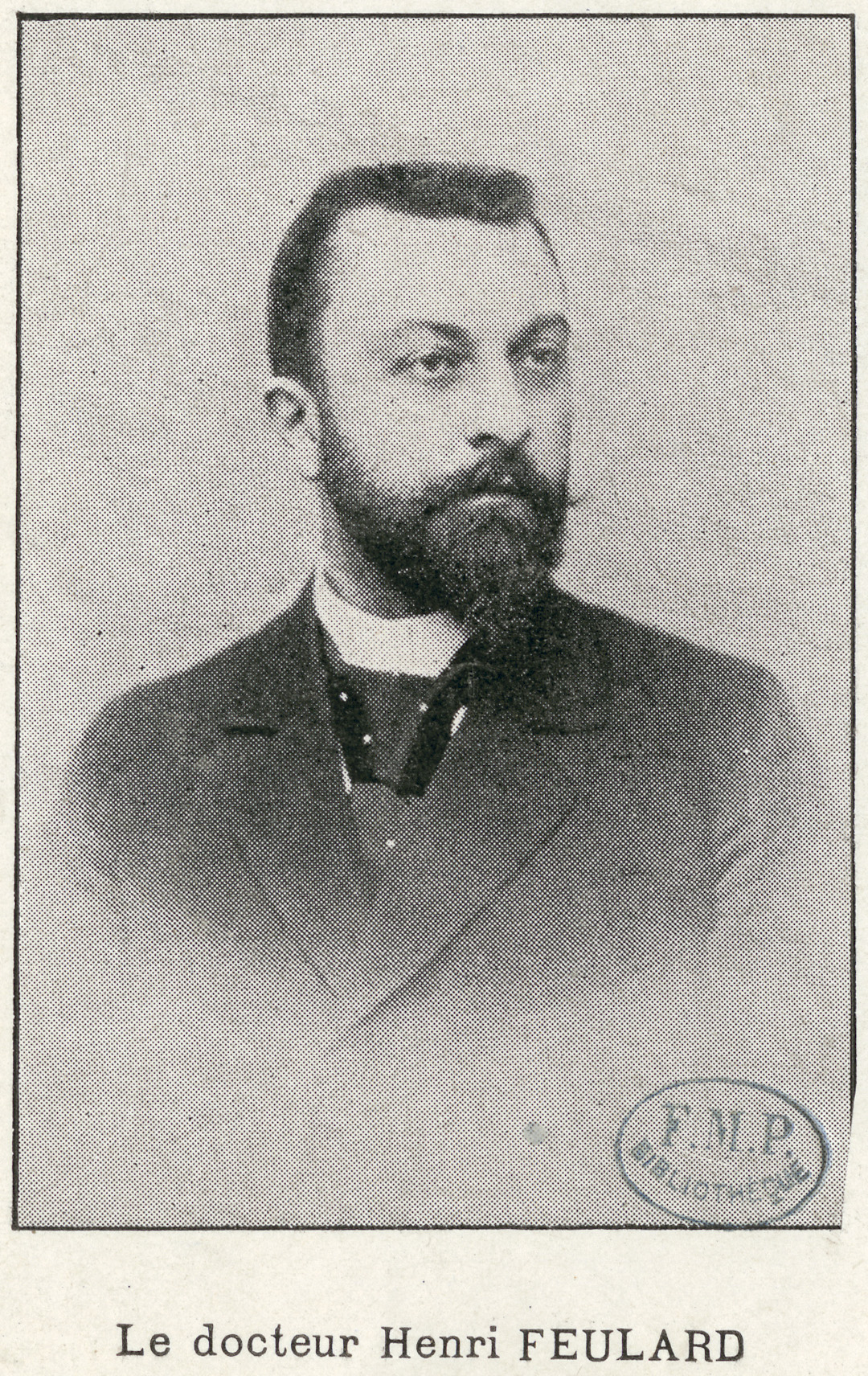
- Born: 20 May 1858; Paris
- Died: 4 May 1897 (aged 38); Paris
- Medical career
- Profession: physician
- Field: dermatology, venereology
- Institutions: Hôpital Saint-Louis, Prison Saint-Lazare
- Research: clinical dermatology, medical history, syphilis

Henri Feulard (French pronunciation: [ɑ̃ʁi følaʁ]; 20 May 1858 – 4 May 1897) was a French dermatologist.

== Life ==
Henri Feulard was born in Paris on 20 May 1858. He trained as a physician in the hospitals of Paris, interning at the Hôpital Saint-Louis, which at the time specialized in dermatology and venereology.

In 1886, he became Professor Jean Alfred Fournier's Chief of Clinic (a position in French teaching hospitals that meant being day-to-day head of a department nominally run by a professor), and helped found the dermatological library in the Hôpital Saint-Louis. He was appointed librarian in 1890, and the library was later renamed Bibliothèque Henri-Feulard – Centre de documentation dermatologique.

Feulard was an organizer and the secretary of the first International Congress of Dermatology, held in Paris in August 1889. He also attended the second International Congress of Dermatology, in Vienna (1892), and the third, in London (1896). He published extensively on clinical dermatology, primarily in the Annales de Dermatologie et de Syphiligraphie, of which he became editor-in-chief in 1890.

From 1892 Feulard also worked at the infirmary of the Prison Saint-Lazare, a women's prison where monthly medical inspections of registered prostitutes were carried out.

== Death ==
On 4 May 1897 Dr Feulard, his wife, their ten-year-old daughter Germaine, and their maid Ernestine Moreau, attended the Bazar de la Charité, a high-class annual charity bazaar in Paris. They were present when the building caught fire. The family became separated in the stampede. Dr Feulard re-entered the building in an attempt to save his daughter, but both perished, as did Ernestine Moreau. Mrs Feulard suffered burn injuries but survived.

Dr Feulard was buried together with his daughter in Montmartre Cemetery, after a service in Notre-Dame-de-Lorette.

== Publications ==
- L'Hôpital Laënnec, ancien hospice des incurables (1634-1884), 1884.
- Histoire de la fondation de l'hôpital Saint-Louis, 1885.
- Teignes et teigneux: histoire médicale, hygiène publique, 1886.
- Fistule ombilicale et cancer de l'estomac, 1887.
- Procès-verbaux du congrès international de dermatologie, 1889.
- Musée de l'Hôpital Saint Louis: catalogue des moulages coloriés, 1889.
- Les hôpitaux de Paris, 1893.
- Iconographie des maladies cutanées et syphylitiques, 1895. With Ernest Besnier.

== Commemoration ==
In 1946 the rue Henri Feulard, in the 10th arrondissement of Paris, was named in his memory.
