= Prince Alfons of Bavaria =

German prince and military general (1862–1933)

Prince Alfons
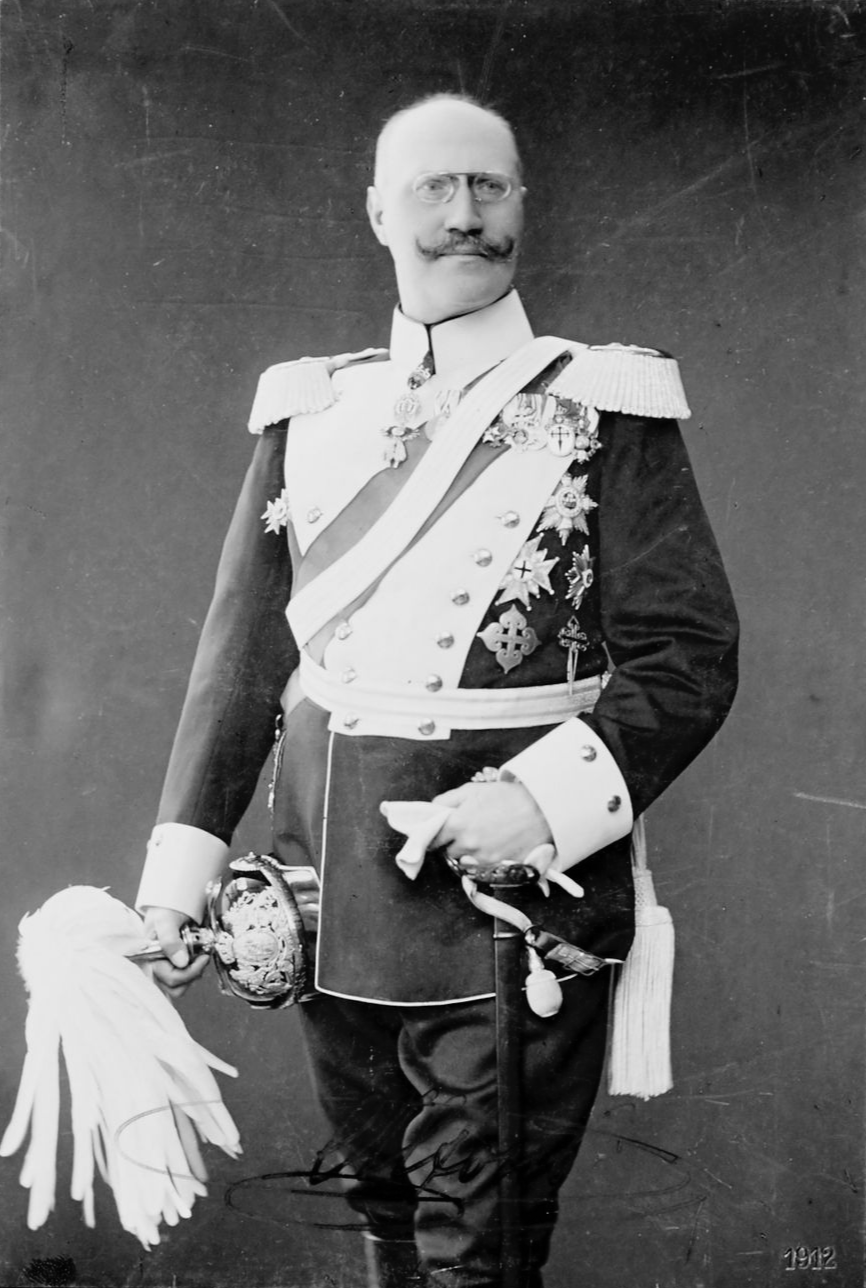
- Photograph, c. 1900
- Born: 24 January 1862; Munich, Bavaria
- Died: 8 January 1933 (aged 70); Munich, Bavaria
- Burial: Michaelskirche, Munich
- Spouse: Princess Louise d’Orléans (m. 1891)
- Issue: Prince Joseph Clemens; Princess Elisabeth Maria
Names
- German: Alfons Maria Franz von Assisi Klemens Max Emanuel
- House: Wittelsbach
- Father: Prince Adalbert of Bavaria
- Mother: Infanta Amalia of Spain

Prince Alfons of Bavaria (German: Alfons Maria Franz von Assisi Klemens Max Emanuel Prinz von Bayern; 24 January 1862 – 8 January 1933) was a member of the Bavarian Royal House of Wittelsbach and a General of Cavalry.

== Early life and family ==
Alfons was born in Munich, Bavaria. He was the second son of Prince Adalbert of Bavaria and his wife Infanta Amalia of Spain. In 1880, as so many young men of his age, Alfons joined the army, soon after becoming a young courtier protege to Ludwig II of Bavaria. On 15 April 1891, Prince Alfons married Princess Louise Victoire d'Orléans-Alençon, the daughter of Duke Ferdinand of Alençon and Duchess Sophie Charlotte in Bavaria. The wedding took place at the Nymphenburg Palace in Munich, Bavaria. The couple had two children:

- Prince Joseph Clemens of Bavaria (1902–1990)
- Princess Elisabeth Maria of Bavaria (1913–2005) married twice, first to Ernest Kusnter and secondly to Hubertus Joseph Alphonse Carl Michael Maria Graf von Kageneck.

== Military career ==
Prince Alfons was commissioned a second lieutenant in the Royal Bavarian 1st Infantry Regiment "König" and later served in the Royal Bavarian 3rd Field Artillery Regiment "Königin Mutter". In 1882, he was transferred into the Royal Bavarian 1st Heavy Cavalry Regiment "Prinz Karl von Bayern", where he was promoted to Rittmeister in 1894, where he served as a squadron commander (Eskadronschef).

He was promoted to Major on 8 March 1889 and was named commander of the 1st Heavy Cavalry Regiment on 15 July 1892. While commander of the regiment, he was promoted to Oberstleutnant (lieutenant colonel) on 21 March 1894 and Oberst (colonel) on 1 September 1896.

On 17 December 1899, he was promoted to Generalmajor and named commander of the Royal Bavarian 1st Cavalry Brigade. On 18 January 1901, he was promoted to Generalleutnant and passed command of the brigade to the later-General der Kavallerie Karl Freiherr von Schacky auf Schönfeld. He was promoted to General der Kavallerie on 23 March 1905.

== Death ==
Prince Alfons of Bavaria died on 8 January 1933 at Munich and is buried in the Colombarium in the Michaelskirche in Munich, Bavaria.

== Honorary titles ==
- À la suite of the Royal Bavarian 1st Heavy Cavalry Regiment (Königlich Bayerisches 1. Schwere-Reiter-Regiment „Prinz Karl von Bayern“), 1901
- Inhaber of the Royal Bavarian 7th Chevauléger Regiment (Königlich Bayerisches 7. Chevaulegers-Regiment „Prinz Alfons“), 24 September 1909
- Chief of the Royal Prussian 5th Dragoon Regiment (Dragoner-Regiment „Freiherr von Manteuffel“ (Rheinisches) Nr. 5), 16 June 1913

== Decorations and awards ==
Prince Alfons received the following orders and decorations:

=== German states ===
- Kingdom of Bavaria:
  - Order of Saint Hubert
  - Honorary Royal Order of Saint George for the Defense of the Immaculate Conception, Grand Prior (1880)
  - St. George Medal
  - Military Merit Order, Grand Cross with Swords
  - Jubilee Medal of the Bavarian Army
  - Service Award Cross, 2nd Class
- Grand Duchy of Baden: House Order of Fidelity
- Duchy of Brunswick:
  - Order of Henry the Lion, Grand Cross
  - War Merit Cross 2nd Class
- Grand Duchy of Hesse: Ludewig Order, Grand Cross (20 September 1900)
- Hohenzollern principalities: Princely House Order of Hohenzollern, Cross of Honour 1st Class
- Grand Duchy of Mecklenburg-Strelitz: Order of the Wendish Crown, Grand Cross with Crown in Ore and Diamonds (22 July 1904)
- Grand Duchy of Oldenburg: House and Merit Order of Peter Frederick Louis, Grand Cross with Golden Crown
- Kingdom of Prussia:
  - Knight of the Black Eagle 03.09.1897
  - Iron Cross (1914), 2nd Class
  - Red Cross Medal 1st Class
  - Commemorative Badge for the Silver Anniversary of the German Imperial Couple 1906
- Kingdom of Saxony: Order of the Rue Crown
- Grand Duchy of Saxe-Weimar-Eisenach: Order of the White Falcon, Grand Cross
- (Saxe-Coburg and Gotha) (Duchy of Saxe-Altenburg) (Saxe-Meiningen) Saxon duchies: Ducal Saxe-Ernestine House Order, Grand Cross
- Kingdom of Württemberg: Order of the Württemberg Crown, Grand Cross

=== Foreign states ===
- Kingdom of Italy: Supreme Order of the Most Holy Annunciation (13 April 1883)
- Ottoman Empire:
  - Liakat Medal in Gold with Sabers
  - Liakat Medal in Silver with Sabers
  - War Medal
- Kingdom of Romania: Order of the Star of Romania, Grand Cross with Swords
- Spain:
  - Order of the Golden Fleece (6 February 1906)
  - Military Order of Santiago
  - Order of Charles III, Grand Cross (26 June 1862), with Collar (31 May 1883)
  - Insignia of the Noble Knightly Association of Zaragoza
  - Insignia of the Noble Knightly Association of Madrid (1910)
  - Medal of the Regency
  - Jubilee Medal of 1809
- Grand Duchy of Tuscany: Order of Saint Joseph, Grand Cross

== Ancestry ==
Ancestors of Prince Alfons of Bavaria

8. Maximilian I Joseph of Bavaria
4. Ludwig I of Bavaria
9. Princess Augusta Wilhelmine of Hesse-Darmstadt
2. Prince Adalbert of Bavaria
10. Frederick, Duke of Saxe-Altenburg
5. Princess Therese of Saxe-Hildburghausen
11. Duchess Charlotte Georgine of Mecklenburg-Strelitz
1. Prince Alfons of Bavaria
12. Charles IV of Spain
6. Infante Francisco de Paula of Spain
13. Princess Maria Luisa of Parma
3. Infanta Amalia of Spain
14. Francis I of the Two Sicilies
7. Princess Luisa Carlotta of the Two Sicilies
15. Infanta Maria Isabella of Spain
