= Bazar de la Charité =

1897 Paris fire

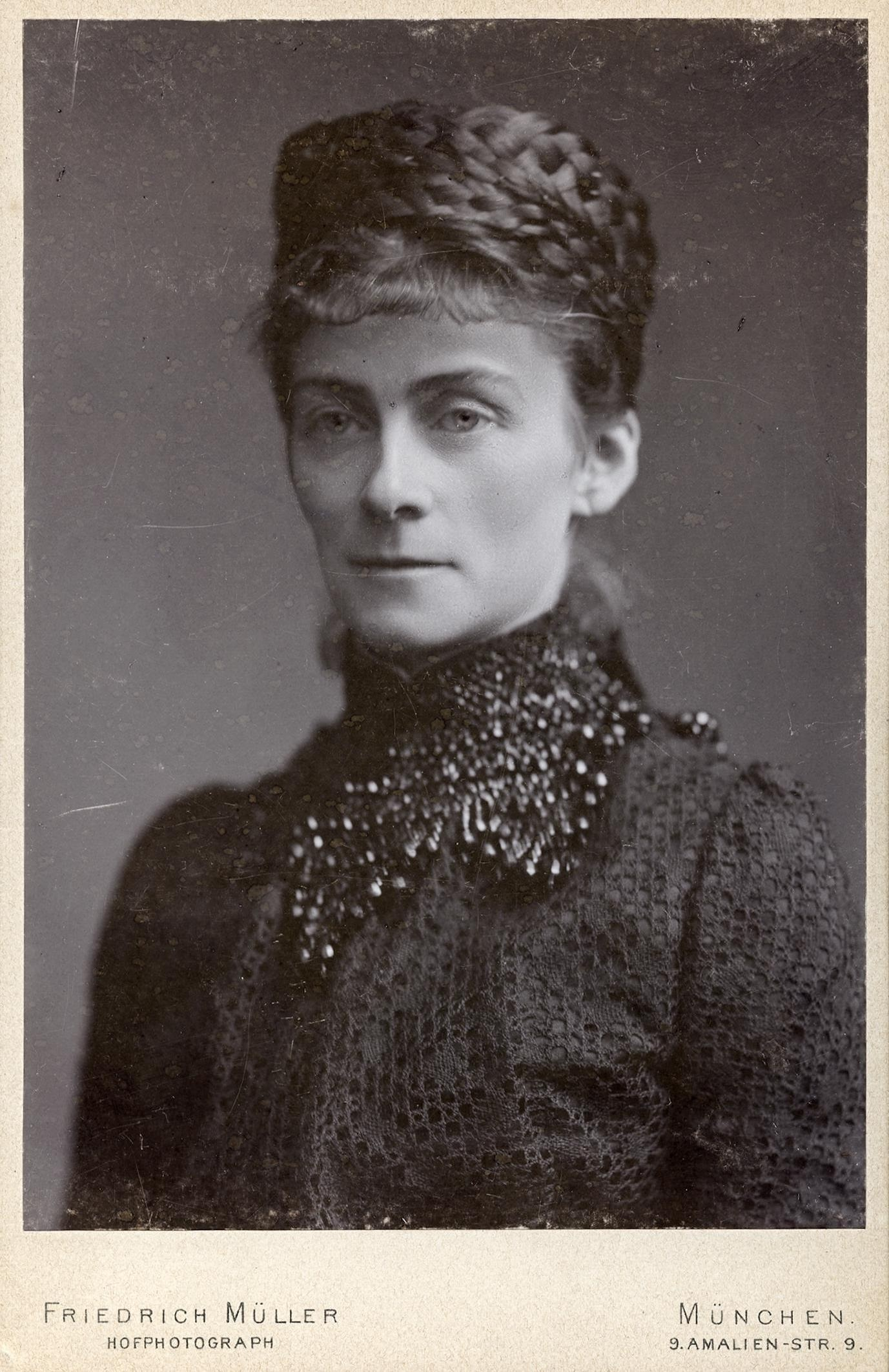
The Duchess of Alençon, née Duchess Sophie in Bavaria, photograph taken in 1895

The Bazar de la Charité was an annual charity event orchestrated by the French Catholic aristocracy in Paris beginning in 1885, when it was first organised by Englishman Henry Blount, the son of banker Sir Edward Blount, a financier of railway enterprises in France. The Bazar was held in a variety of locations by a consortium of charitable organisations that shared renting fees, acting to reduce costs and group potential buyers.

The 1897 Bazar de la Charité became known for the fire which claimed 126 lives, many of which were notable aristocratic women, including Sophie Charlotte, Duchess of Alençon.

== Fire of 1897 ==
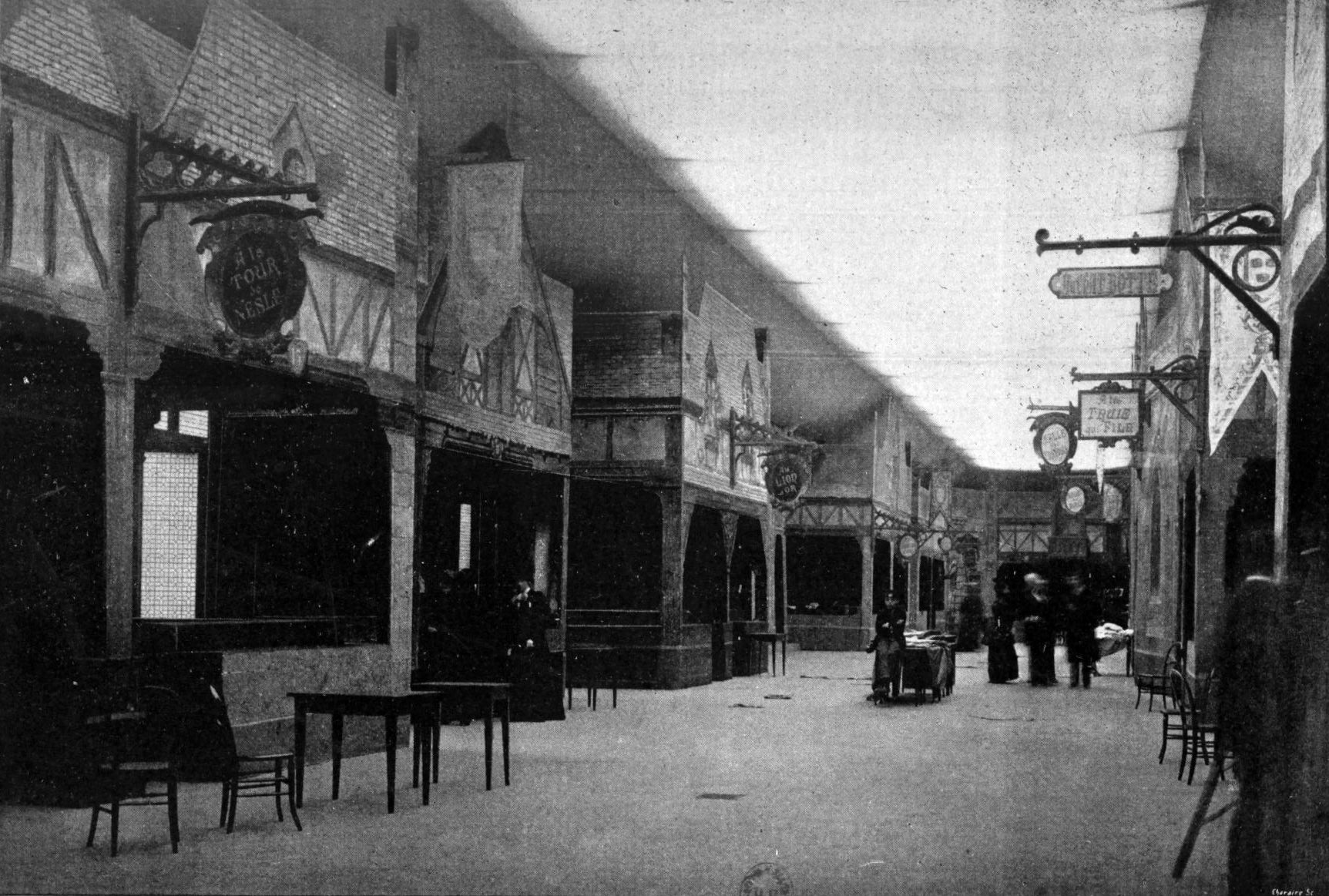
Interior, before the fire

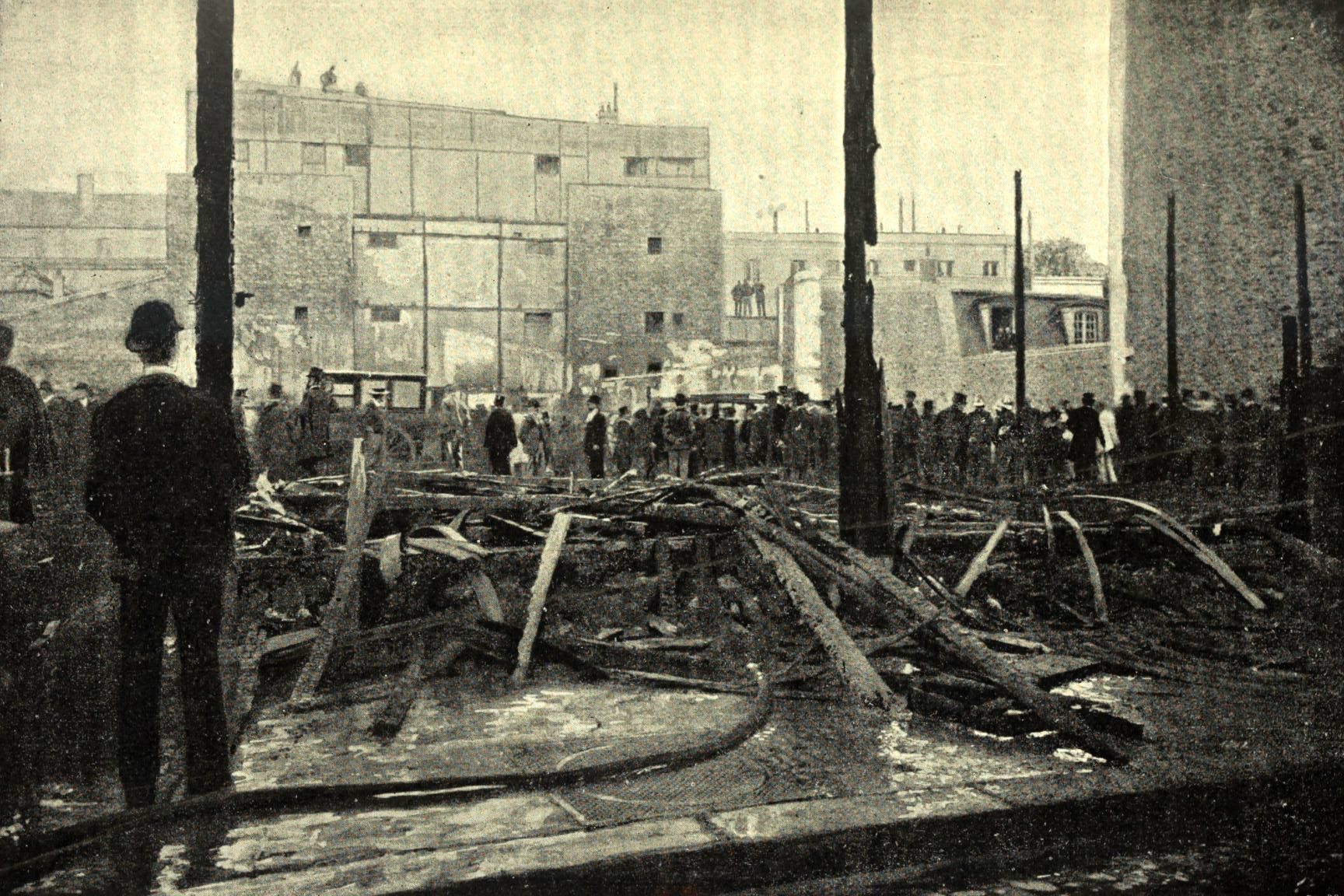
After the fire

In 1897, the Bazar was located in the 8th arrondissement of Paris at 17 Rue Jean-Goujon, inside a large wooden warehouse which the organisers had reconstituted as a medieval street using painted wood, cardboard, cloth, and papier-mache. One of the key attractions of the Bazar, scheduled for 3 to 6 May, was to be a cinematograph installation which functioned with ether lamps.

On the afternoon of 4 May, the projectionist's equipment caught fire, and 126 people — mostly aristocratic women wearing impractical and highly flammable corsets and crinoline — died as a result of the following blaze and the panic of the crowd in attendance. Over 200 others sustained additional injuries, and the disaster—noted for improperly marked exits—was reported internationally.

Some of the visitors fleeing through the courtyard were aided in escaping through the windows of the adjacent Hôtel du Palais' kitchen by the hotel's manager, Mme Roche-Sautier, and cook M Gauméry. The condition of the charred remains of the victims was such that dental records were necessary for identification, which in itself became a landmark in the early history of forensic dentistry.

In the aftermath of the fire, 937,438 francs, equivalent to the amount raised by the previous year's Bazar, was donated by an anonymous benefactor to the charitable purposes for which the Bazar de la Charité had been organised.

== Notre-Dame-de-Consolation ==
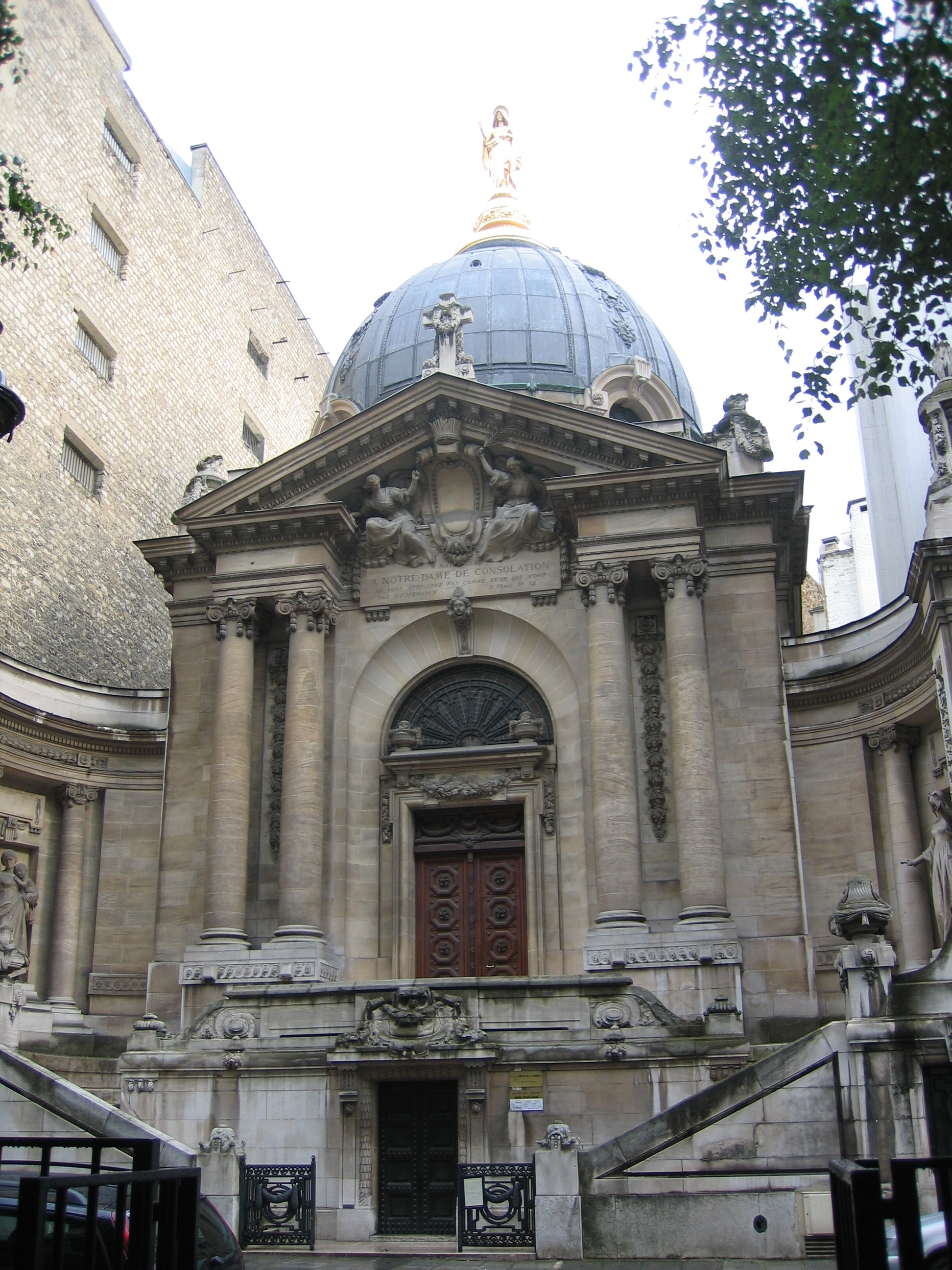
Notre-Dame-de-Consolation, Paris

A Catholic chapel, the Notre-Dame-de-Consolation, was built on the location of the Bazar in honour of the victims of the fire, and is currently owned by the Bazar de la Charité Memorial association. It was classed as a historic monument in 1982, and in 2013 was devolved to the Society of Saint Pius X.

== Victims of the fire ==
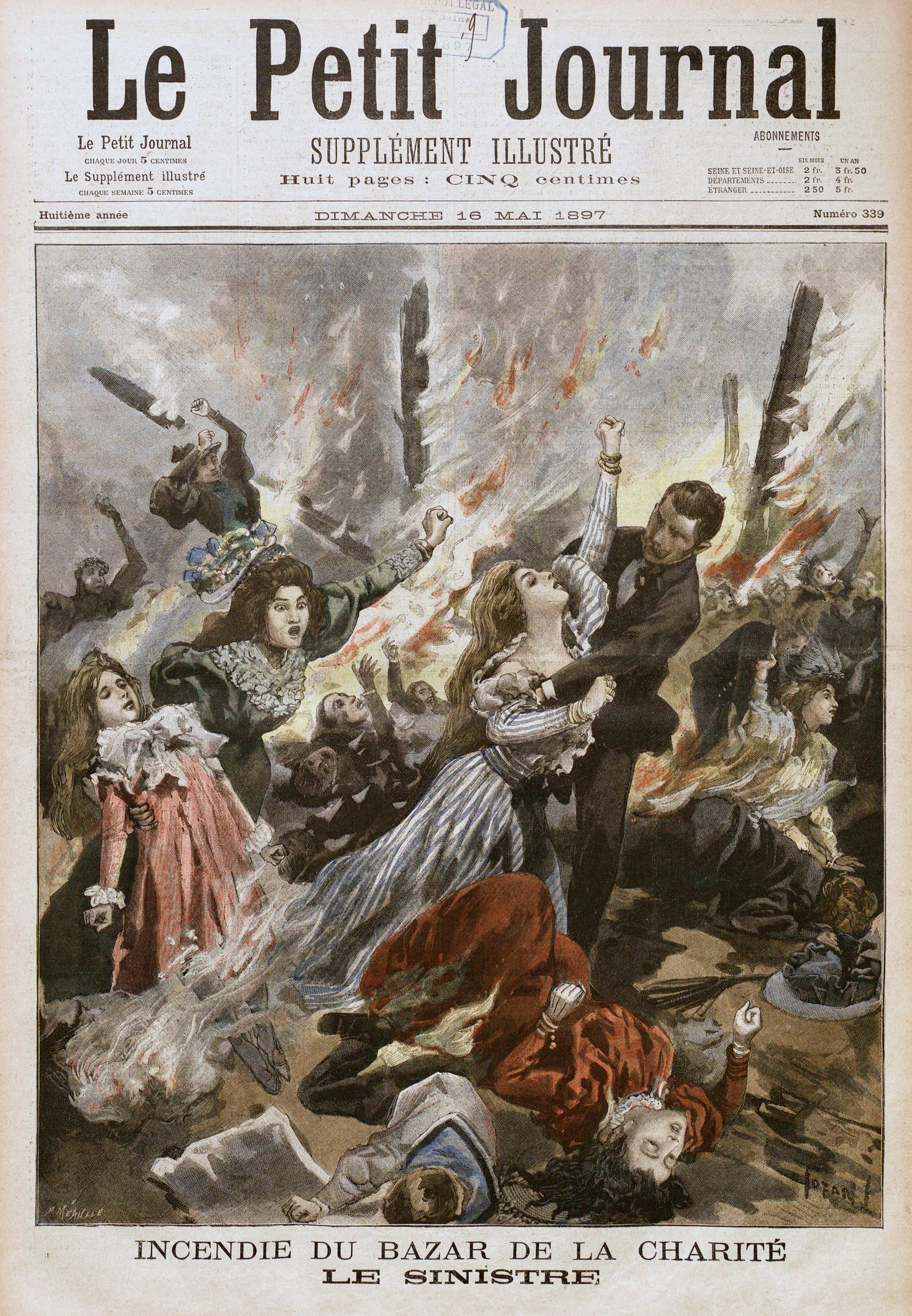
A contemporary report of the fire

A Romanian newspaper published pictures of some of those killed.

The following individuals were numbered among the 126 victims of the fire.

- Sophie Charlotte of Bavaria, Duchess of Alençon (1847–1897). A leading patron of the bazaar, she had insisted on remaining until all those working under her had been rescued. Her body was unrecognisable, even to her personal maid, but was identified by her dentist on the basis of her gold fillings.
- Claire Beucher de Saint Ange (1829–1897), sister of Laure Beucher (below). The two were visitors to the bazaar. Her body was burned beyond recognition, but she was initially identified by her maid on the basis of her red flannels, and the identification was later confirmed by her husband, General Eugène Chevals, from a scar on her breast.
- Laure Beucher de Saint Ange (1827–1897), sister of Claire Beucher (above). The two were visitors to the bazaar. The baroness of Saint Ange's body was burned beyond recognition but was identified by her maid on the basis of three rings she had been wearing.
- Elise Blonska (1835–1897). A Russian immigrant who was librarian to Jules Claretie, she had been working a stall raising money for the blind. Her body, burned beyond recognition, was identified by her orthopaedic corset. She was buried in the Montparnasse Cemetery on 13 May.
- Dona Adélaïda Corradi y Anduga, Madame Florez (1847–1897), died of her injuries in Beaujon Hospital.
- Claire Dalloyau (1838–1897), wife of Auguste Bouvyer, was a member of the Third Order of Saint Dominic. She and her daughter were working at the duchess of Alençon's stall. The daughter suffered serious burns but survived. Mrs Bouvyer's body was entirely consumed by the fire, with no part recovered, requiring a court order to pronounce her dead.
- Lucie Dehondt (1871–1897), in religion Sr Vincent of the Daughters of Charity of Saint Vincent de Paul, was present with Sr Marie Ginoux and Valérie Verhasselt (both below) to raise money for the orphans of Le Raincy.
- Thérèse Donon (1857–1897), baroness Saint-Didier, attended the bazaar to assist her husband's aunt, the dowager baroness Saint-Didier (Louise Pedra, below). After being rescued she re-entered the building thinking her niece, Mademoiselle Kergorlay, was still inside.
- Marie du Quesne (1857–1897), Viscountess Bonneval, whose husband had been a member of the Chamber of Deputies of the Third French Republic from 1885 to 1889. She was helping at one of the stalls in the bazaar. After escaping the fire she had re-entered the building to try to help a friend. Her body was identified by her husband on the basis of her jewellery. Her 15-year-old daughter fell ill and died nine days later. Both were buried in the family vault in Issoudun.
- Dr Henri Feulard (1858–1897), visited the bazaar together with his wife, their ten-year-old daughter Germaine, and the family maid Ernestine Moreau (below). The family became separated in the stampede. Dr Feulard re-entered the building in an attempt to save his daughter, but both perished, as did Ernestine Moreau. Mrs Feulard suffered critical burn injuries, but survived.
- Juilie Garivet (1853–1897), in religion Sr Marie-Madeleine of the Blind Sisters of St Paul.
- Anna Ginoux de Fermon (1863–1897), in religion Sr Marie of the Daughters of Charity of Saint Vincent de Paul, was the superior of her order's house in Le Raincy. She was present with Sr Vincent Dehondt (above) and Valérie Verhasselt (below) to raise money for the orphans of Le Raincy. Her remains were transported to Brittany for burial in the family vault. Her funeral mass was attended by thousands, including the Daughters of Charity of Nantes and 25 priests from the neighbourhood.
- Blanche Grossier (1852–1897), wife of the industrialist Achille Chouippe, who employed upwards of 300 workers. She kept the company accounts and took care to do right by her husband's employees. She had visited the bazaar as a customer. Her body was identified from her clothes.
- Léonie Guillaumet (1868–1897), a young woman attached to the Daughters of Charity of St Vincent de Paul of Saint-Louis-en-l'Isle, accompanied Sr Joseph Sabatier (below) to assist with her efforts.
- Amélie Guyard-Delalain (1829–1897), wife of Alfred Carteron and mother of Jeanne Carteron. She was at the bazaar to help with a stall to support the charitable works of the parish of Saint-Roch, Paris.
- Hélène de Haber, Comtesse de Horn (1831–1897), died of her injuries in Beaujon Hospital.
- Marie Hoskier (1858–1897), was the daughter of Emile Hoskier, the Danish consul general in Paris, and of Elise Weyer (below), and the wife of Eugène Roland-Gosselin, who belonged to a leading family of Parisian stockbrokers. A Protestant convert to Catholicism, she was very active in charitable projects. Her mother also died in the fire.
- Emma Jaume (1830–1897), wife of General Warnet, her second husband. She had previously been widowed as Madame de Terrasse, and visited the bazaar because her daughter by her first marriage was running a stall to benefit the Daughters of Charity of St Vincent de Paul of Clichy. She was buried with her parents in the Cimetière Saint-Martin, Perpignan.
- Jeanne de Kergorlay (1849–1897), wife of Jean Guy de Poilloüe, count Saint-Périer, and mother of (among others) René de Saint-Périer. A large woman, she remained inside the building giving a leg-up to others escaping through a high window (including her niece, Mademoiselle Kergorlay) until the floor gave way. Her body was identified by her children's governess on the basis of her jewellery, and the identification confirmed by her father.
- Eugénie Marlé (1853–1897), wife of Louis Chapuis, a businessman in the Bercy neighbourhood, active in the charitable works of the parish of Saint Roch. Her body was burnt beyond recognition but was identified due to a bracelet.
- Christianne Meilhac (1882–1897), aged 15, visited the bazaar together with her grandfather, Victor Poidevin (below), and an old friend of his, Dr Ernest Rochet (below). After calling at the stall where Mrs Rochet was assisting Viscountess Malézieu, the three took a turn around the building to admire the decorations. They were at the furthest point from the exit when the fire started. Ms Meilhac's body was not identified for several days, until after her grandfather's funeral had already taken place.
- Laura Meinell, Viscountess d'Avenel (1855–1897). The wife of the economic historian Viscount Georges d'Avenel, Viscountess d'Avenel kept a salon noted for the attendance of leading figures in literature, the arts and diplomacy. On returning home from the catastrophe she did not seem seriously hurt, but she later died of internal injuries. She was buried in the Père Lachaise Cemetery.
- Ernestine Moreau (1862–1897). Maid to the Feulard family (above), she was buried in Montmartre Cemetery.
- Louiza Francesca Pedra (1816–1897), dowager baroness of Saint-Didier. Born in London to Portuguese parents, and growing up in England, in 1836 she married Baron Armand-Aimé de Saint-Didier, a magistrate who would go on to become a director of the Compagnie des chemins de fer du Nord. As a widow she divided her time between socialising and charity work.
- Pénélope Petrocochino (1836–1897), widow of Antoine Vlasto, died of her injuries three days after the incident.
- Victor Poidevin (1825–1897), visited the bazaar together with his granddaughter, Christiane Meilhac (above), and an old friend, Dr Ernest Rochet (below). After calling at the stall where Mrs Rochet was assisting Viscountess Malézieu, the three took a turn around the building to admire the decorations. They were at the furthest point from the exit when the fire started.
- Aline Ramboug, Madame Anatole Le Brun de Sesseval (1826–1897), was rescued from the fire by her 15-year-old granddaughter, Mademoiselle de Froissard, who re-entered the building to save her, but she died of her injuries four days later.
- Marguerite Rémond (1835–1897), in religion Sr Sainte Claire of the Blind Sisters of St Paul.
- Dr Ernest Rochet (1830–1897), visited the bazaar together with a friend, Mr Poidevin (above) and his granddaughter, Christiane Meilhac (above). After calling at the stall where Mrs Rochet was helping Viscountess Malézieu, the three took a turn around the building to admire the decorations. They were at the furthest point from the exit when the fire started. Dr Rochet was identified by scraps of clothing burnt to his body.
- Adèle Sabatier (1830–1897), in religion Sr Joseph of the Daughters of Charity of Saint Vincent de Paul, was one of three Daughters of Charity to die in the fire, the only one from the community in Saint-Louis-en-l'Isle.
- Valérie Verhasselt (1876–1897), aged 20, a boarder at the orphanage run by the Daughters of Charity of St Vincent de Paul in Le Raincy, had accompanied Sr Marie Ginoux and Sr Vincent Dehondt (both above) to the bazaar. She was buried in Raincy cemetery.
- Elise Weyer (1836–1897), wife of Emile Hoskier, the Danish consul general in Paris, died together with her daughter Marie Hoskier (above), wife of the stockbroker Eugène Roland-Gosselin.

== In popular culture ==
- The event inspired the 1947 film, The Scarlet Bazaar (French: La kermesse rouge).
- In the German telefilm, A Passionate Princess (German: Sophie – Sissis kleine Schwester), the Duchess Sophie was featured.
- In the French telefilm, The President's Mistress (French: La maîtresse du président), the President of France Felix Faure worries about the hypothetical presence of his mistress at the scene of the tragedy.
- The TF1/Netflix co-production Le Bazar de la Charité (streamed on Netflix under the title The Bonfire of Destiny) premiered in 2019.
- The Greek TV miniseries Μετά την φωτιά premiered in 2023.
