= Saint-Louis-en-l'Isle =

- Commune
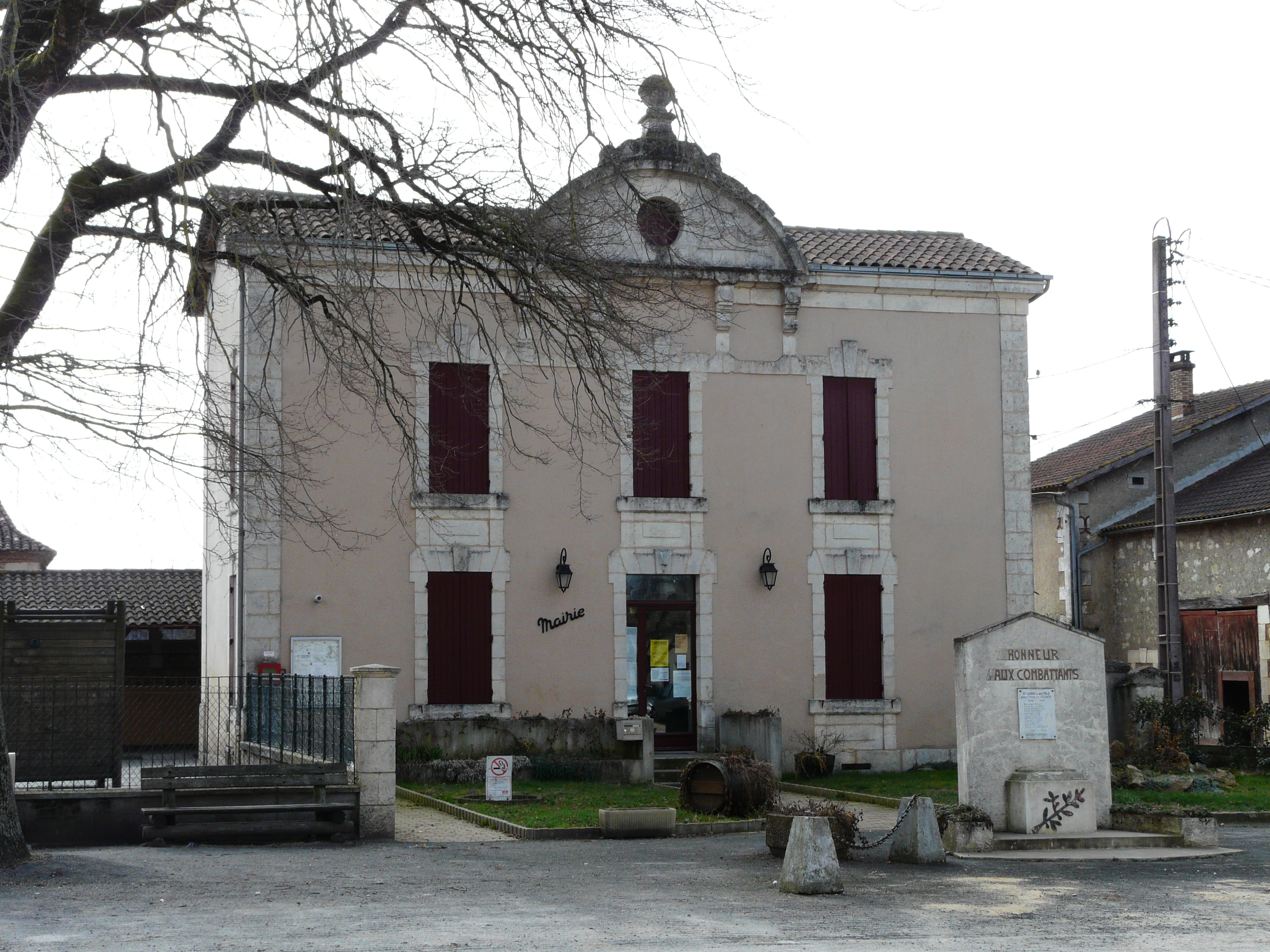
- Town hall

- Coat of arms
- Location of Saint-Louis-en-l'Isle
- Location within France Location within Nouvelle-Aquitaine
- Coordinates: 45°03′41″N 0°23′32″E
- Country: France
- Region: Nouvelle-Aquitaine
- Department: Dordogne
- Arrondissement: Périgueux
- Canton: Vallée de l'Isle

Government
  - Mayor (2020–2026): Jean-Luc Massias
- Area^{1}: 2.82 km^{2} (1.09 sq mi)
- Elevation: 58 m (190 ft)
- Highest elevation: 127 m (417 ft)
- Lowest elevation: 43 m (141 ft)
- Population (2023): 311
  - Density: 110/km^{2} (286/sq mi)
- Time zone: UTC+01:00 (CET)
  - Summer (DST): UTC+02:00 (CEST)
- INSEE/Postal code: 24444 /24400
- ^{1} French Land Register data, which excludes lakes, ponds, glaciers > 1 km^{2} (0.386 sq mi or 247 acres) and river estuaries.

(For the Paris Church of the same name see Saint-Louis-en-l'Île)

Saint-Louis-en-l'Isle (French pronunciation: [sɛ̃ lwi ɑ̃ lil]; Limousin: Sent Loís d'Eila) is a commune in the Dordogne department in Nouvelle-Aquitaine in southwestern France.

== Population ==
Historical population
Year	Pop.	±% p.a.
1968	204	—
1975	241	+2.41%
1982	220	−1.29%
1990	233	+0.72%
1999	224	−0.44%
2007	248	+1.28%
2012	269	+1.64%
2017	303	+2.41%
2023	311	+0.44%
Source: INSEE

== See also ==
- Communes of the Dordogne department
