= Prince Ferdinand, Duke of Alençon =

French prince; grandson of Louis Philippe I

Prince Ferdinand
- Duke of Alençon
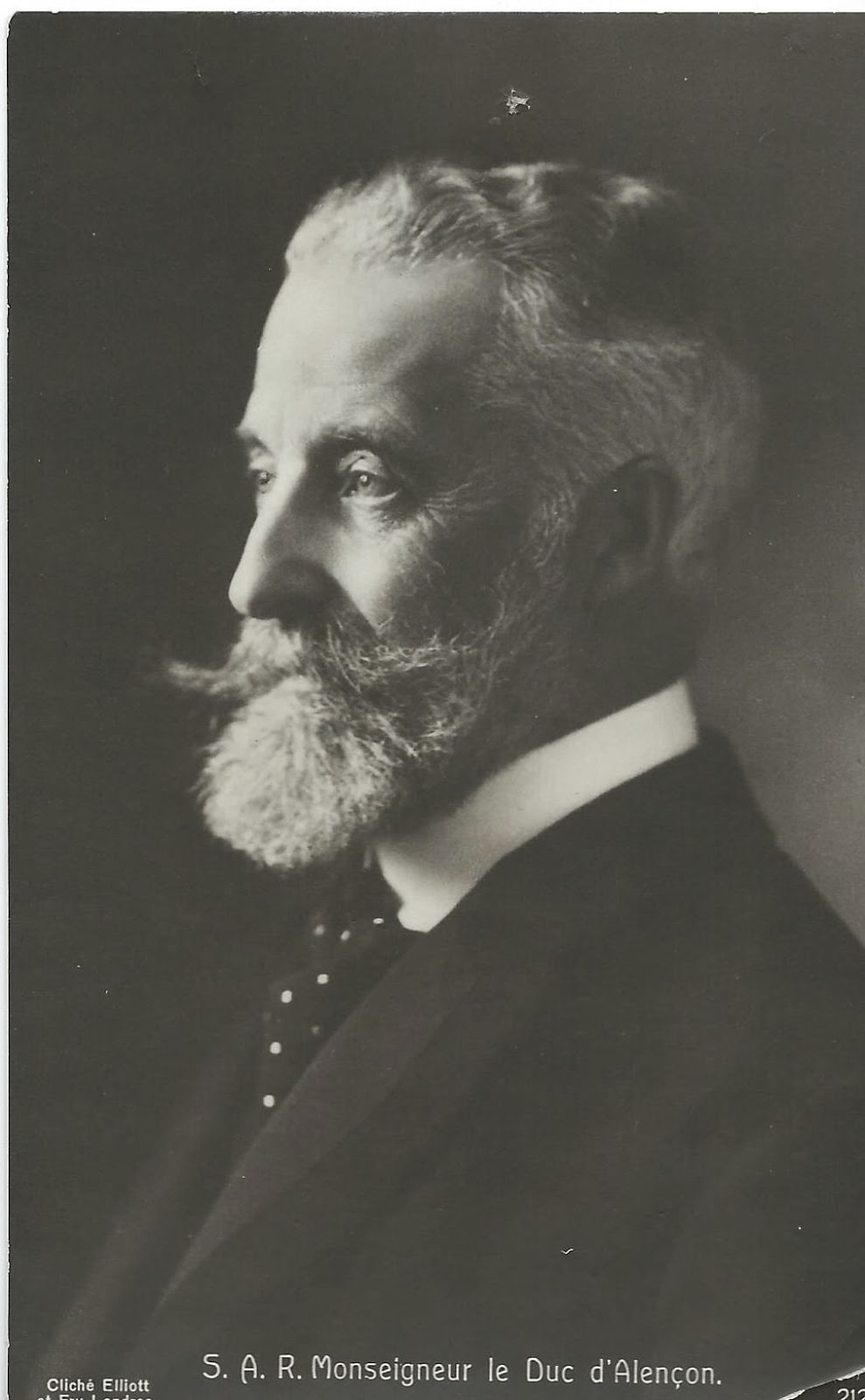
- Born: 12 July 1844; Neuilly-sur-Seine, France
- Died: 29 June 1910 (aged 65); Wimbledon, London
- Burial: Royal Chapel, Dreux, France
- Spouse: Duchess Sophie Charlotte in Bavaria (m. 1868; died 1897)
- Issue: Louise, Princess Alfons of Bavaria; Prince Emmanuel, Duke of Vendôme
Names
- French: Ferdinand Philippe Marie
- House: Orléans
- Father: Prince Louis, Duke of Nemours
- Mother: Princess Victoria of Saxe-Coburg and Gotha

Ferdinand Philippe Marie d'Orléans, duc d'Alençon (12 July 1844 – 29 June 1910) was the son of Louis Charles Philippe Raphael d'Orléans, Duke of Nemours and Princess Victoria of Saxe-Coburg and Gotha (a first cousin of Queen Victoria).

== Early life ==
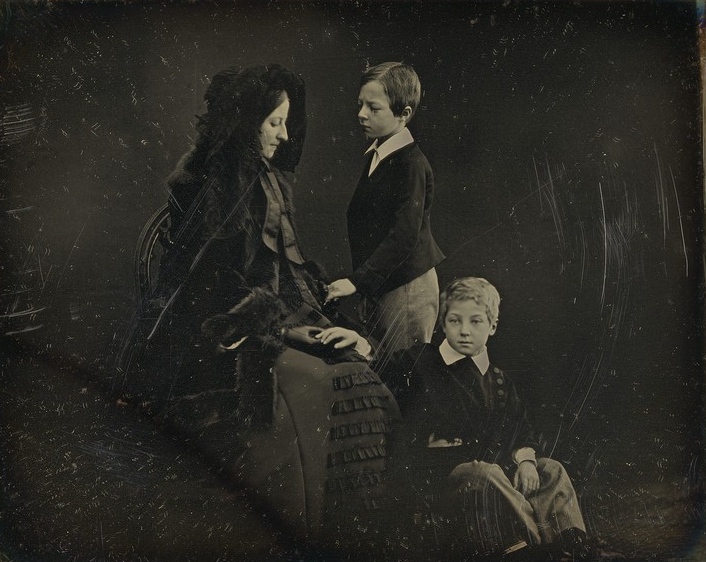
Duchess Victoria of Nemours with her two sons (Gaston and Ferdinand), 1852

Prince Ferdinand of Orléans was born on 12 July 1844. He was the son of Prince Louis, Duke of Nemours, and Princess Victoria of Saxe-Coburg and Gotha, cousin of Queen Victoria. Among his siblings was older brother Prince Gaston of Orleans, Count of Eu, the Imperial consort of Brazil (through his marriage to Isabel, Princess Imperial of Brazil), and younger sister Princess Marguerite Adélaïde of Orléans, wife of Prince Władysław Czartoryski.

His paternal grandparents were Maria Amalia of Naples and Sicily, Queen consort of the French, and King Louis Philippe, who was forced to abdicate after the outbreak of the French Revolution of 1848.

His maternal grandparents were Prince Ferdinand of Saxe-Coburg and Gotha and Princess Maria Antonia Koháry.

== Personal life ==
On 28 September 1868, he married Sophie Charlotte Augustine, Duchess in Bavaria (1847–1897) at Possenhofen Castle, near Starnberg. Sophie, the ninth of ten children born to Duke Maximilian Joseph in Bavaria and Princess Ludovika of Bavaria, was a sister of Empress Elisabeth of Austria, Queen Maria Sophie of the Two Sicilies, and Duchess Mathilde Ludovika in Bavaria, the wife of Neapolitan Prince Luis of the Two Sicilies. Before their marriage, she had been engaged to King Ludwig II of Bavaria, but the King called off the engagement before the marriage. The year after their marriage, the ducal couple moved into Bushy House in the Teddington area of Southwest London. The couple had two children:

- Louise d'Orléans (1869–1952), who married Prince Alfons of Bavaria (1862–1933) and had children.
- Emmanuel d'Orléans (1872–1931), duke of Vendôme, who married Princess Henriette of Belgium (1870–1948) and had children.

His wife died in a fire at the Bazar de la Charité in Paris on 4 May 1897. He died in Wimbledon on 29 June 1910. He was buried at the Chapelle royale de Dreux, the Orléans family necropolis.

== Ancestry ==
Ancestors of Prince Ferdinand, Duke of Alençon

8. Louis Philippe II, Duke of Orléans
4. Louis Philippe I of France
9. Louise Marie Adélaïde de Bourbon
2. Prince Louis, Duke of Nemours
10. Ferdinand I of the Two Sicilies
5. Princess Maria Amalia of Naples and Sicily
11. Archduchess Maria Carolina of Austria
1. Prince Ferdinand, Duke of Alençon
12. Francis, Duke of Saxe-Coburg-Saalfeld
6. Prince Ferdinand of Saxe-Coburg and Gotha
13. Countess Augusta Reuss of Ebersdorf
3. Princess Victoria of Saxe-Coburg and Gotha
14. Ferenc József, Prince Koháry de Csábrág et Szitnya
7. Princess Maria Antonia Koháry of Csábrág and Szitnya
15. Countess Maria Antonia von Waldstein

== Orders and decorations ==
- Kingdom of Bavaria: Knight of the Order of Saint Hubert, 1868
