= Duchess Sophie Charlotte in Bavaria =

Duchess of Alençon (1847–1897)

Sophie Charlotte
- Duchess of Alençon
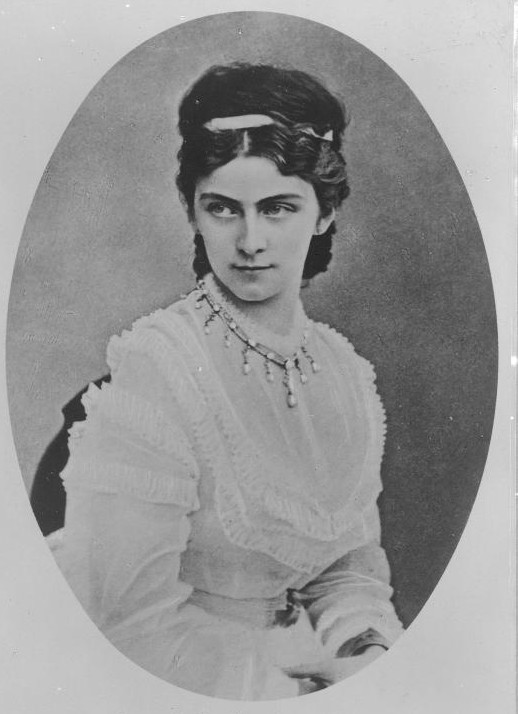
- Born: 23 February 1847; Possenhofen Castle, Possenhofen, Bavaria
- Died: 4 May 1897 (aged 50); 17 Jean-Goujon Street, Paris, France
- Burial: Chapelle royale de Dreux
- Spouse: Prince Ferdinand, Duke of Alençon (m. 1868)
- Issue: Louise, Princess of Bavaria; Prince Emmanuel, Duke of Vendôme
Names
- Sophie Charlotte Auguste
- House: Wittelsbach
- Father: Duke Maximilian Joseph in Bavaria
- Mother: Princess Ludovika of Bavaria

Duchess Sophie Charlotte Auguste in Bavaria (22 February 1847 – 4 May 1897) was the granddaughter-in-law of King Louis Philippe of France, the favorite youngest sister of Empress Elisabeth of Austria and the fiancée of King Ludwig II of Bavaria.

== Life ==
Sophie Charlotte was born in Munich, the residence of her paternal family, the Dukes in Bavaria. She was a daughter of Duke Maximilian Joseph in Bavaria and Princess Ludovika of Bavaria and the ninth of ten children born to her parents.

=== Marriage ===
Upon the 1861 marriage of her elder sister Duchess Mathilde Ludovika to the Neapolitan prince Louis of the Two Sicilies, her parents looked for a suitable husband for Sophie Charlotte. Sophie then was engaged to her cousin King Ludwig II of Bavaria, and their engagement was publicised on 22 January 1867, but after having repeatedly postponed the wedding date, Ludwig finally cancelled it in October as Ludwig had homosexual tendencies (he was never again engaged to be married), and also because it seemed Sophie had fallen in love with the court photographer Edgar Hanfstaengl. Five love letters from Sophie to Edgar were published by Edgar's daughter Erna. In one, she wrote: "I love you so dearly, my Edgar, so dearly, that I've shamefully neglected the duties to my poor King."

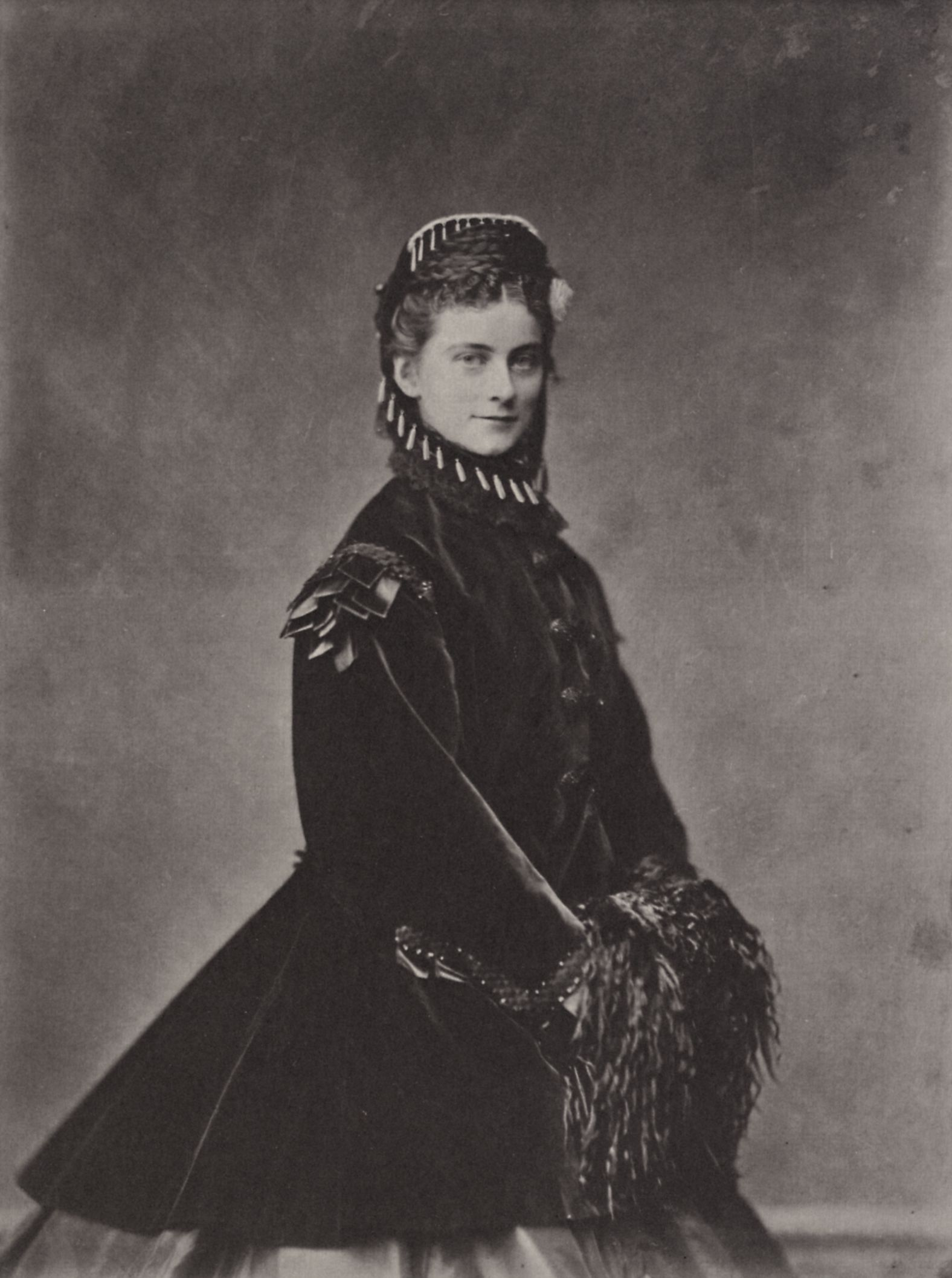
Duchess Sophie Charlotte in 1867, photograph by Joseph Albert

Other proposed husbands included the renowned homosexual Archduke Ludwig Viktor of Austria, brother of both Franz Joseph I of Austria and Maximilian I of Mexico, as well as the future Luís I of Portugal. Another candidate was Duke Philipp of Württemberg, (Note: Son of Princess Marie of Orléans, daughter of Louis Philippe I.) the first cousin of her eventual husband.

She refused all the candidates, and was sent to stay with her aunt Amalie Auguste, then the Queen of Saxony as wife of King John. It was in Saxony that Sophie Charlotte met Prince Ferdinand of Orléans, Duke of Alençon, the son of Prince Louis, Duke of Nemours and grandson of the late King Louis Philippe. Soon after, on 28 September 1868, she married him at Possenhofen Castle, near Starnberg. King Ludwig II attended the reception.

=== Duchess of Alençon ===
She had a good relationship with her husband as well as with her sister-in-law Princess Marguerite Adélaïde of Orléans, wife of Prince Władysław Czartoryski. Her mother-in-law, Princess Victoria of Saxe-Coburg and Gotha, cousin of Queen Victoria of the United Kingdom, had died in 1857. Sophie Charlotte did not have an overly good relationship with her father-in-law, the widowed Duke of Nemours.

The year after their marriage, the ducal couple moved into Bushy House in the Teddington area of Southwest London, where Sophie Charlotte gave birth to her first child, Princess Louise of Orléans.

=== Affair and stay at a sanatorium ===
In the winter of 1886–1887, Sophie came down with diphtheria and scarlet fever. On the advice of her brother Karl Theodor, she sought treatment in Munich and, eventually, recovered thanks to the care of Dr. Franz Joseph Sebastian Glaser. He was a married physician with three children, who was a year her junior. They fell in love, and planned to divorce their spouses to marry each other.

In June 1887, Dr. Glaser divorced his wife. That same month, her husband and various physicians declared that the Duchess of Alençon suffered from 'moral delusion'. On the advice of the physicians, and ironically, Karl Theodor, the Duke of Alençon sent his wife to the Mariagrün Sanatorium, near Graz. She was allowed to stay there with her maid Paula and her dog Ponto. The sanatorium was run by the psychiatrist Richard von Krafft-Ebing, who was specialised in sexual perversions. One of the alleged treatments used at Mariagrün was sprinkling ice-cold water on the patients. Sophie smuggled three letters to Dr. Glaser, but no responses from him have been found. He married another woman in December 1888.

In January 1888, after seven months at the sanatorium, Sophie gave up her plans of a divorce and returned to her husband. In 1891, however, she suffered from jaundice and tried to contact Dr. Glaser once more, but her husband found out. She confessed everything, and he forgave her.

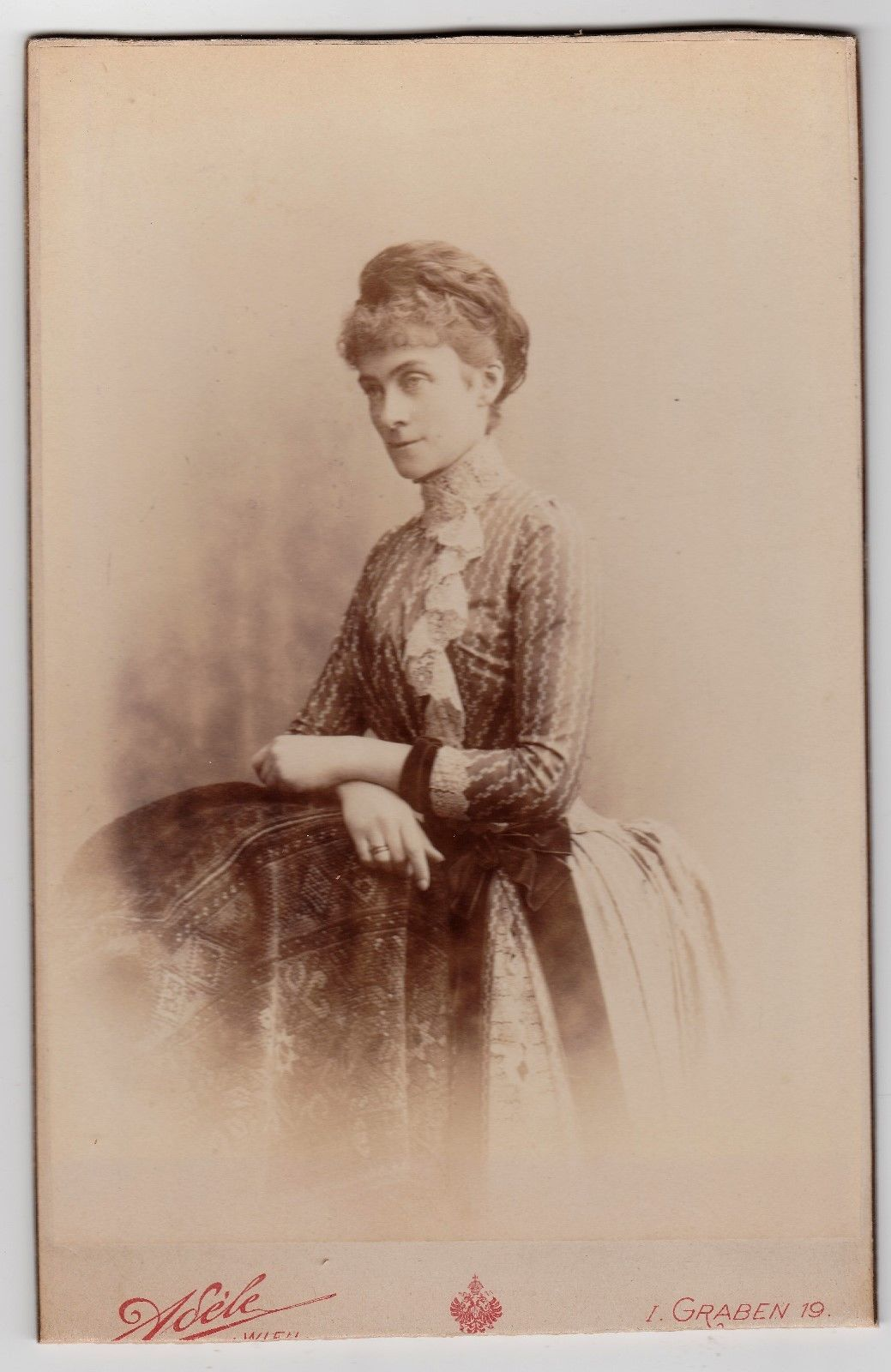
Duchess Sophie Charlotte in 1886

=== Later years and death ===
Sophie Charlotte wrote her last will and testament on 4 October 1896, seven months before her death: she died in a fire at the Bazar de la Charité in Paris on 4 May 1897, where she had been helping to raise funds for charity. She refused to be rescued, insisting that the girls, visitors and nuns working alongside her at the bazaar be saved first. A Dominican nun who had managed to escape from the fire explained that she saw the Duchess get down on her knees and start praying.

Identifying Sophie Charlotte's remains was not easy; her personal maid was unable to recognise the body, as it had been severely disfigured by the fire. The Duchess's dentist, M. Lavanport, was called in. After two hours examining various bodies, he identified Sophie Charlotte on the basis of her gold fillings. Thus she became one of the first people whose remains were identified by forensic dentistry. She was buried at the Chapelle royale de Dreux.

== Issue ==
- Louise Victoire Marie Amélie Sophie d'Orléans (19 July 1869 – 4 February 1952); married Prince Alfons of Bavaria and had issue. The family line ended in a dynastical sense in 1990 in male line, with cognatic descendants still present.
- Philippe Emmanuel Maximilien Marie Eudes d'Orléans, Duke of Vendôme (18 January 1872 – 1 February 1931); married Princess Henriette of Belgium (Note: Sister of Albert I of Belgium and daughter of Prince Philippe, Count of Flanders who in turn was a grandson of Louis-Philippe of France.) and had issue. The family line ended dynastically in 1970 in male line, with cognatic descendants still present.

== Coat of arms ==
Royal Monogram of Sophie Charlotte, Duchess of Bavaria

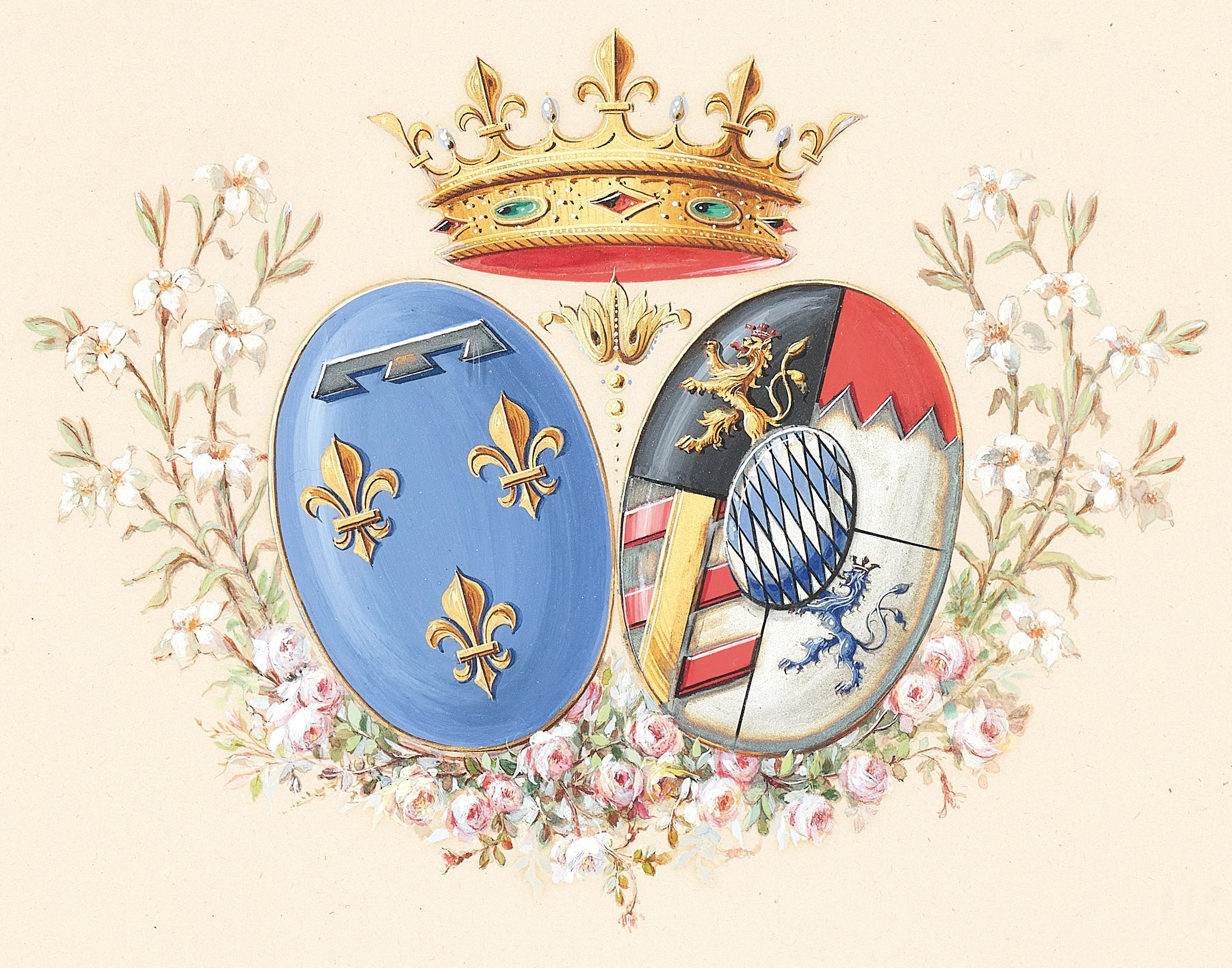
Alliance Coat of Arms Orleans - Bavaria
