= Prince Alberto of Naples and Sicily =

Member of the House of Bourbon

Prince Alberto
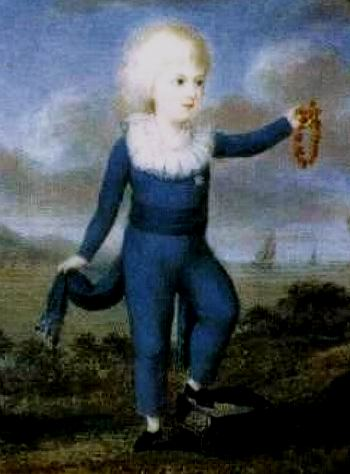
- Portrait of Prince Alberto by an unidentified artist
- Born: 2 May 1792; Royal Palace, Naples
- Died: 25 December 1798 (aged 6); On board HMS Vanguard
- Burial: Palermo, Sicily
Names
- Alberto Lodovico Maria Filipo Gaetano di Borbone
- House: Bourbon-Two Sicilies
- Father: Ferdinand IV of Naples
- Mother: Maria Carolina of Austria

Prince Alberto of Naples and Sicily (Alberto Lodovico Maria Filipo Gaetano; 2 May 1792 – 25 December 1798) was a Prince of Naples and Sicily as the youngest son of King Ferdinand I of the Two Sicilies and Maria Carolina of Austria. He died aged 6 near Palermo, Sicily, during a storm on board HMS Vanguard, a British Royal Navy warship, whilst his family was fleeing, under the care of Admiral Lord Nelson, from Napoleonic troops approaching Naples.

== Origins ==
Alberto was a member of the House of Bourbon of Naples, a Prince of Naples and Sicily by birth. He was born in Naples and baptised Alberto Lodovico Maria Filipo Gaetano, the sixteenth child and seventh son of King Ferdinand IV of Naples, by his wife Maria Carolina of Austria, a daughter of Empress Maria Theresa and thus a sister of Marie Antoinette. From his birth he was third in line to the Neapolitan throne after his brothers Prince Francis, Duke of Calabria (later King Francis I of the Two Sicilies), and Leopold, Prince of Salerno, the other brother Carlo, Duke of Calabria having died of smallpox in 1778.

His elder sisters included Maria Theresa of Naples and Sicily (the future Holy Roman Empress), Princess Luisa of Naples and Sicily (Grand Duchess of Tuscany), Princess Maria Cristina of Naples and Sicily (Queen of Sardinia), the wife of King Charles Felix of Sardinia; Maria Cristina's twin Princess Maria Cristina Amelia died in 1783 of smallpox. Another sister was the Queen of the French and the last surviving daughter was the future Princess of Asturias.

His cousins included the Duke of Parma, Grand Duke of Tuscany, Holy Roman Emperor, Queen of Portugal, King of Spain and a Duchess of Calabria, the first wife of his brother Francis.

=== Death ===
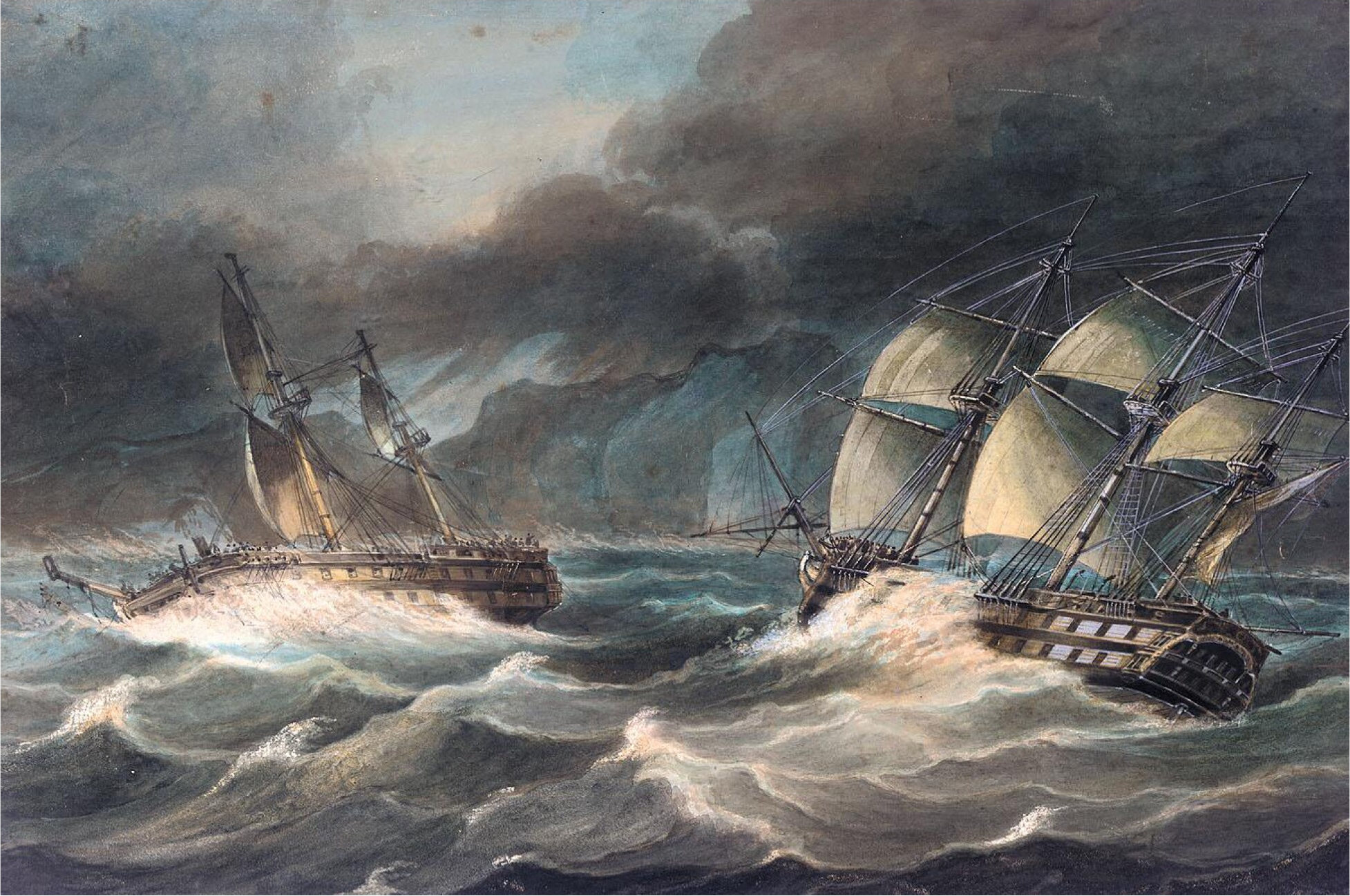
A storm on 12 May 1798 off Toulon depicting left: Vanguard, with blown off topmasts and foremast; right: Alexander

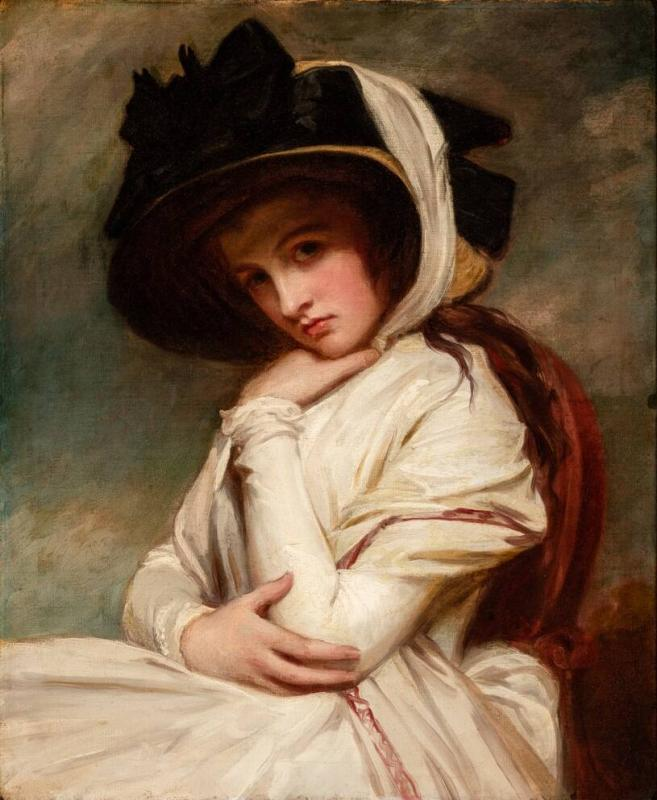
Lady Hamilton, Nelson's mistress, in whose arms the six-year-old Prince Alberto died on board the Vanguard approaching Palermo in a storm

On the outbreak of the French Revolution in 1789, the Neapolitan court was not hostile to the movement. However, when the French monarchy was abolished and Marie Antoinette and King Louis XVI (Alberto's aunt and uncle) were executed, his parents joined the First Coalition against France in 1793, a year after Alberto's birth.

Although peace was made with France in 1796, by 1798 conflict was again fierce. It was decided that the king and royal family should flee to the Kingdom of Sicily, to his secondary capital of Palermo, leaving his primary capital in a state of anarchy. During the cold and stormy night of 21 December 1798, the royal family including six-year-old Prince Alberto, and escorted in person by Admiral Nelson, left the royal palace at Naples and via a long underground tunnel reached the Vittoria landing stage where a British barge was waiting in the heavy swell of Naples Bay. It transferred them to the British Royal Navy flagship HMS Vanguard waiting offshore out of range of cannon-fire, which was in turn protected by two Neapolitan warships, three British transports and a Portuguese squadron. The Vanguard was overcrowded with many other Neapolitan and British refugees, and was "rolling at single anchor". It was not until two days later, at 7 pm on 23 December that the Vanguard set sail for Palermo. On 24 December in Nelson's own words "it blew harder than I have ever experienced since I have been at sea", and the Vanguard "laboured prodigiously" and "all rest was out of the question". The Vanguard's topsails were blown to pieces, and "in the ladies' quarters the Duchess of Castelcicala cut her head on Admiral Nelson's sideboard and little Prince Alberto fell into convulsions". The Ambassadress "Lady Hamilton, Nelson's mistress, and one of the Queen's stewards Saverio Rodino, a faithful and sure man, were the only passengers to keep their heads". In the words of Nelson, Lady Hamilton "from the moment that she had come on board ... had put him and the whole royal family under an eternal obligation". The Ambassador, her husband Sir William Hamilton, also "made every sacrifice for the comfort of the august royal family", but was found during the height of the gale in his cabin with pistols in each hand "resolved not to die with the 'guggle-guggle-guggle' of the salt water in his throat". On Christmas Day morning the wind moderated, and although Prince Alberto "apparently entirely recovered, ate a hearty breakfast", he soon afterwards began to "display symptoms of agony" and by 7 pm had died in the arms of Lady Hamilton, whose favourite of all the royal children he had become. A mourning brooch containing two lockets of his blonde hair survives in the National Museum of the Royal Navy, Portsmouth (item RNM 1957/53) inscribed "Prince Albert died in my arms 25th Dec'r 1798", and on the reverse "1st Aug 98", with depiction of a gold trident breaking in two a French flag, the date of Nelson's victory in the Battle of the Nile, which had saved the Kingdom of Naples from Napoleonic conquest by sea. It was presumably formerly the property of Lady Hamilton. The Vanguard disembarked the Queen and Princesses at Palermo at 2 am on 26 December, accompanied in person by Nelson, and the King disembarked at 9 am, also assisted by Nelson, at his secondary capital with formal ceremony. It is generally said that Alberto died of exhaustion, after suffering four days on the stormy sea. He was buried in Palermo and his funeral was the first official engagement his family attended in Sicily. He died on the same day as his cousin Maria Amalia of Austria.

=== Letter from Admiral Nelson ===
On 28 December 1798, Nelson wrote concerning the voyage to Admiral John Jervis, 1st Earl of St Vincent, commander-in-chief of the fleet in the Mediterranean, including the following:

Your Lordship will believe that my anxiety was not lessened by the great charge that was with me, but not a word of uneasiness escaped the lips of any of the Royal Family. On the 25th, at 9AM, Prince Albert their Majesties’ youngest child, having eat a hearty breakfast, was taken ill, and at 7PM, died in the arms of Lady Hamilton; and here it is my duty to tell your Lordship the obligations which the whole Royal Family as well as myself are under on this trying occasion to her Ladyship.

== Ancestry ==
Ancestors of Prince Alberto of Naples and Sicily

8. Philip V of Spain
4. Charles III of Spain
9. Elisabeth Farnese
2. Ferdinand I of the Two Sicilies
10. Augustus III of Poland
5. Maria Amalia of Saxony
11. Maria Josepha of Austria
1. Prince Alberto of Naples and Sicily
12. Leopold, Duke of Lorraine
6. Francis I, Holy Roman Emperor
13. Élisabeth Charlotte of Orléans
3. Maria Carolina of Austria
14. Charles VI, Holy Roman Emperor
7. Maria Theresa of Austria
15. Elisabeth Christine of Brunswick
