= Domenico Cirillo =

Italian physician

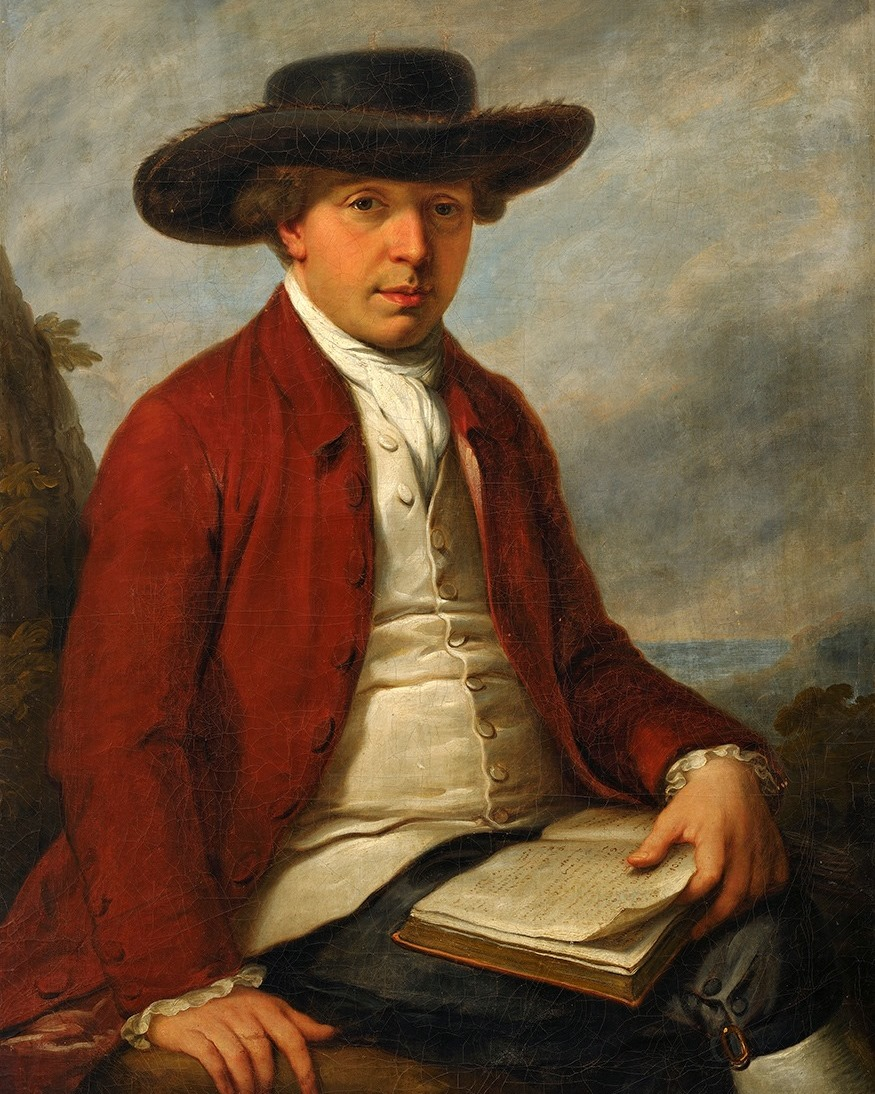
- Portrait of Domenico Cirillo by Angelica Kauffman, oil on canvas, 1784-6, National Museum of San Martino, Naples
- Born: 10 April 1739; Grumo Nevano, Kingdom of Naples
- Died: 29 October 1799 (aged 60); Naples
- Other names: Domenico Maria Leone Cirillo
- Awards: Corresponding member of the American Philosophical Society
- Scientific career
- Fields: botany, entomology, medicine
- Author abbrev. (botany): Cirillo

Signature
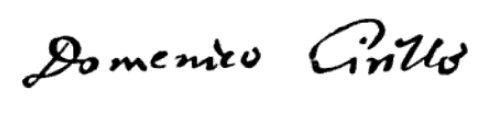

Domenico Maria Leone Cirillo (10 April 1739 in Grumo Nevano, Kingdom of Naples – 29 October 1799 in Naples) was an Italian physician, entomologist, botanist and patriot of the Neapolitan Republic of 1799.

== Professional life ==
Cirillo completed his medical degree at the University of Naples in 1759 and assumed the role of Professor of Botany there the following year. He was a pioneer in the Kingdom of Naples for introducing the Linnaean system, to which he had been initiated through fruitful contacts with Gioachino Venturi, a disciple of Linnaeus.

Cirillo embarked on numerous botanical expeditions and produced numerous publications in the fields of botany and entomology. Additionally, he possessed remarkable skills as an illustrator, providing detailed descriptions and drawings for over thirty plant species, many of which are still recognised today. An excellent microscopist, he discovered the role of pollen in plant fertilisation. These contributions to the field of botany were recognised by Carl Linnaeus himself, who honoured Cirillo by naming the plant genus Cyrilla after him.

In 1777, Cirillo was appointed as a Medicine Professor at the University of Naples. Concurrently, he served as a physician at the Naples Hospital of the Incurables, where he taught Physiology and Obstetrics. Furthermore, he held the esteemed position of Court Physician for the Kingdom of Naples. His clientele ranged from local dignitaries and foreign diplomats to the less fortunate, whom he treated without charge. Cirillo authored several medical publications and devised an innovative treatment for syphilis. He was among the first physicians in Italy to maintain a medical journal documenting his patients. Moreover, he introduced numerous medical advancements to Naples, notably the practice of smallpox inoculation.

As well as several works on hygiene he also wrote:

- Ad botanicas institutiones introduction, Naples, 1771
- De essentialibus nonnullarum plantarum characteribus commentarius (in Latin). Napoli. 1784.
- Plantae rarae Regni Neapolitani (in Latin). Napoli. 1792.
- Entomologiae Neapolitanae Specimen Primum, Naples, 1787 – 1792

Cirillo visited England and France, and his fame reached even the other side of the Atlantic, as attested by his election to the American Philosophical Society in 1768. Due to a transcription error, however, his name was recorded as "Professor Famitz" in the Society's minutes and membership roll. A Professor from the University of Naples recently exposed the error and prompted the American Philosophical Society to correct its records after 255 years, thus recognising Cirillo as its first Italian member.

== Patriot and Martyr of the Neapolitan Republic ==
With French help, the Neapolitan Republic was established in January 1799, causing the monarch and his government to flee to Sicily. After at first refusing to take part in the new government, Cirillo consented to be chosen as a representative of the people and became a member of the legislative commission, of which he was eventually elected president. By June of the same year, the republic collapsed when the French withdrew and the city was overtaken by Cardinal Ruffo's counter-revolutionary Sanfedist army. Ferdinand IV's army returned to Naples, and the Republicans withdrew to the forts, ill-armed and with inadequate provisions. After a short siege, the Republicans surrendered on what they considered honourable terms: life and liberty being guaranteed to them by the signatures of Ruffo, of Foote, and of Micheroux.

The arrival of Lord Nelson changed the state of affairs, and he refused to ratify the capitulation. Secure under the British flag, Ferdinand and his wife, Marie Caroline of Austria, showed themselves eager for revenge, and Cirillo joined other Republicans in fighting back.

Cirillo wrote to Emma, Lady Hamilton (wife of the British ambassador to Naples) asking her to intercede on his behalf, but Nelson wrote of the petition: "Domenico Cirillo, who had been the King's physician, might have been saved, but that he chose to play the fool and lie, denying that he had ever made any speeches against the government, and saying that he only took care of the poor in the hospitals". He was condemned to death, and hanged on 29 October 1799.

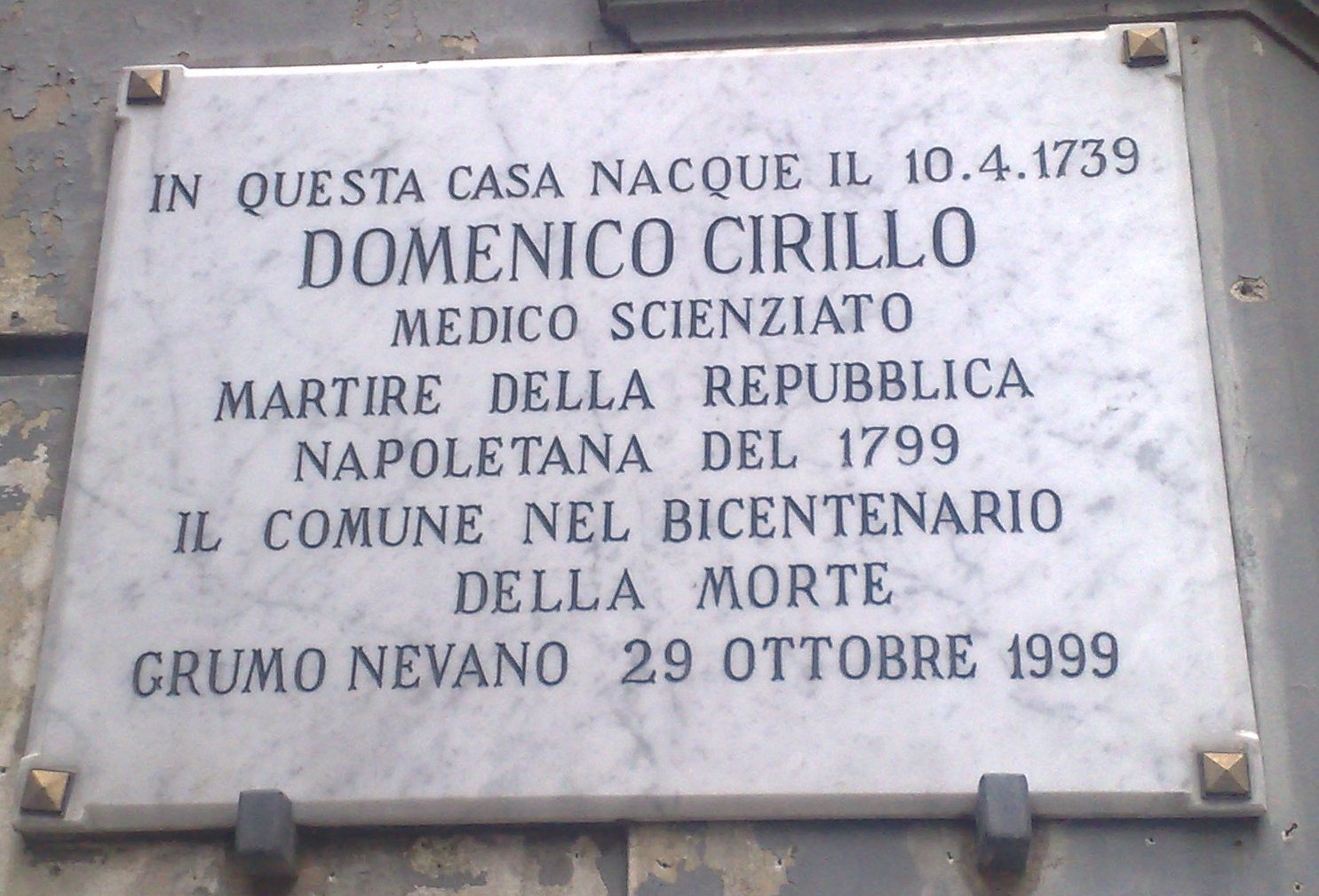
Commemorative plaque on the building where he was born, in Grumo Nevano

Today, Grumo Nevano, his hometown, has named a school after him (now the Institute Comprehensive Matteotti-Cirillo), erected a statue in the central square of the town, and named a library "Biblioteca Comunale Domenico Cirillo". The state boarding school in Bari and the High School of Aversa in Caserta are also named for him.

== Works ==
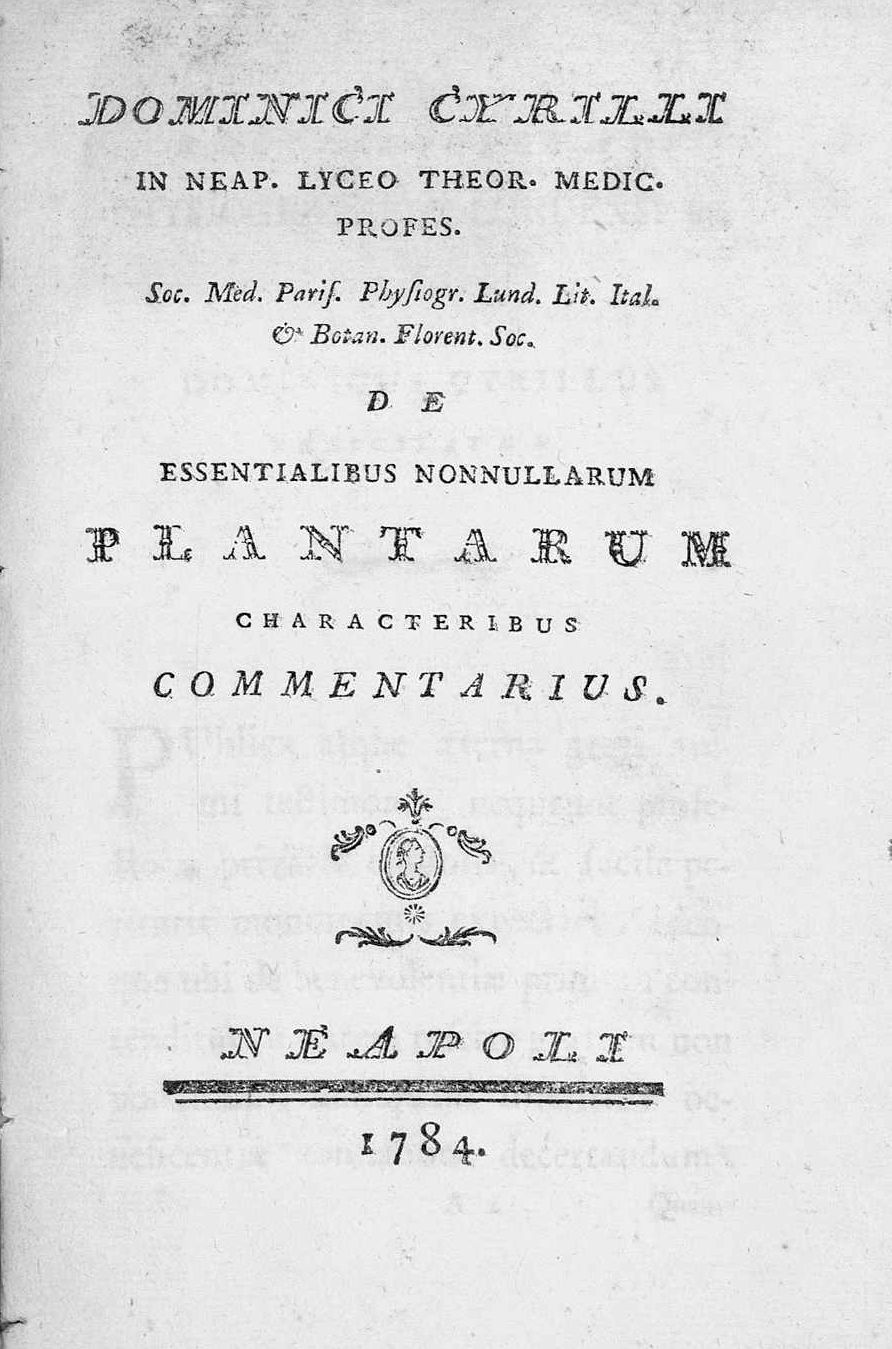
De essentialibus nonnullarum plantarum characteribus commentarius, 1784

- De essentialibus nonnullarum plantarum characteribus commentarius (in Latin). Napoli. 1784.
- Plantae rarae Regni Neapolitani (in Latin). Napoli. 1792.
