= Princess Maria Clotilde of Naples and Sicily =

Princess Maria Clotilde
- Coat of arms of Maria Clotilde of Naples
- Born: 18 February 1786; Naples
- Died: 10 September 1792 (aged 6 years, 6 months); Naples
- Burial: September 1792; Santa Chiara
Names
- Maria Clotilde Teresa Amelia Antonietta Giovanna Battista Anna Gaetana Polcheria
- House: Bourbon-Two Sicilies
- Father: Ferdinand I of the Two Sicilies
- Mother: Maria Carolina of Austria

Princess Maria Clotilde of Naples and Sicily (Italian: Maria Clotilda Teresa Amelia Antonietta Giovanna Battista Anna Gaetana Pulcheria; 18 February 1786 – 10 September 1792) was a member of the House of Bourbon in the Kingdom of the Two Sicilies. She was styled Princess of Naples and Sicily.

== Early life ==
Maria Clotilde was born in Naples. Her father was Ferdinand, Duke of Calabria, the third son and ninth child of Charles III of Spain and Maria Amalia of Saxony. Her mother was the Archduchess of Austria, the tenth daughter and thirteenth child of the famous Maria Theresa of Austria and her husband, Francis I, Holy Roman Emperor. She was baptised during the first year of her life. Her full name was Maria Clotilda Teresa Amelia Antonietta Giovanna Battista Anna Gaetana Pulcheria. She was born and died while her father was still styled Duke of Calabria. She was then styled Princess of Naples and Sicily. Her older siblings included Maria Theresa, namesake of her grandmother, born in 1772; Maria Luisa, born in 1773 and Carlo, Duke of Calabria, born in 1775, who also died in childhood; Francis, born in 1777 and Maria Amalia, born in 1782.

== Death ==
Both Maria Clotilde and her sister Maria Henrietta of Naples and Sicily were very sensible children with a very frail health. In the case of Maria Clotilde, this was the result of a cold in 1786, when the princess was just a few days old. In 1789, Maria Clotide caught smallpox from her brothers, Prince Gennaro of Naples and Sicily and Carlo Gennaro. She then passed it on to her sister Maria Henrietta, but both recovered yet they remained very very frail and the smallpox returned to Maria Clotide in September 1792, who yet again passed it on to her sister, the two dying within ten days of each other.

== Ancestry ==
Ancestors of Princess Maria Clotilde of Naples and Sicily

8. Philip V of Spain
4. Charles III of Spain
9. Elisabeth Farnese
2. Ferdinand I of the Two Sicilies
10. Augustus III of Poland
5. Maria Amalia of Saxony
11. Maria Josepha of Austria
1. Maria Clotilde of Naples and Sicily
12. Leopold, Duke of Lorraine
6. Francis I, Holy Roman Emperor
13. Élisabeth Charlotte of Orléans
3. Maria Carolina of Austria
14. Charles VI, Holy Roman Emperor
7. Maria Theresa of Austria
15. Elisabeth Christine of Brunswick
