= Maria Isabella =

Maria Isabella may refer to:

- María Isabella of Spain (1789–1848), Queen of the Two Sicilies
- Princess Maria Isabella of Naples and Sicily (1793–1801), daughter of Ferdinand I of the Two Sicilies and Maria Carolina of Austria
- Archduchess Maria Isabella of Austria (1834–1901), daughter of Leopold II, Grand Duke of Tuscany and Princess Maria Antonia of the Two Sicilies
- Duchess Maria Isabella of Württemberg (1871–1904)

== See also ==
- My Life for Maria Isabella, 1935 German film
