= Princess Maria Isabella of Naples and Sicily =

Princess Maria Isabella
- Portrait of Princess Maria Isabella
- Born: 2 December 1793; Naples, Kingdom of Naples
- Died: 23 April 1801 (aged 7)
- Burial: Basilica of Santa Chiara
Names
- Maria Isabella di Borbone
- House: Bourbons of Naples
- Father: Ferdinand I of the Two Sicilies
- Mother: Maria Carolina of Austria

Princess Maria Isabella of Naples and Sicily (2 December 1793 – 23 April 1801) was a member of the House of Bourbon as the youngest child and daughter of Ferdinand I of the Two Sicilies and Maria Carolina of Austria.

== Biography ==
Maria Isabella was born in Naples, and was named after her paternal aunt Maria Isabel Ana, who died at the age of six in 1749. Her father was Ferdinand, Duke of Calabria, the third son and ninth child of King Charles III of Spain and Queen Maria Amalia of Saxony. Her mother was Archduchess Maria Carolina of Austria, the tenth daughter and thirteenth child of the famous Empress Maria Theresa and her husband, Francis I, Holy Roman Emperor. Through her mother she was a niece of Marie Antoinette, and also through her father she was a niece of Maria Luisa of Spain and Charles IV of Spain.

Her brothers included the future King Francis and Leopold, Prince of Salerno. Another brother, Carlo, Duke of Calabria, died in 1778 aged 3 of smallpox. Her older sisters included Princess Maria Theresa, namesake of her grandmother, and Princess Luisa, future Grand Duchess of Tuscany. Her older sister Princess Maria Cristina was the wife of the future Charles Felix of Sardinia as Queen of Sardinia. Another sister, Princess Maria Cristina Amelia, died in 1783 of smallpox. Another sister was the Queen of the French as the wife of Louis Philippe I and the youngest was the future Princess of Asturias.

Maria Isabelle died on 23 April 1801, at the age of seven. She was buried at the Church of Santa Chiara in Naples.

== Ancestry ==
Ancestors of Princess Maria Isabella of Naples and Sicily

8. Philip V of Spain
4. Charles III of Spain
9. Elisabeth Farnese
2. Ferdinand I of the Two Sicilies
10. Augustus III of Poland
5. Maria Amalia of Saxony
11. Maria Josepha of Austria
1. Princess Maria Isabella of Naples and Sicily
12. Leopold, Duke of Lorraine
6. Francis I, Holy Roman Emperor
13. Élisabeth Charlotte of Orléans
3. Maria Carolina of Austria
14. Charles VI, Holy Roman Emperor
7. Maria Theresa of Austria
15. Elisabeth Christine of Brunswick

== Bibliography ==
- Richard Reifenscheid, Die Habsburger in Lebensbildern, Piper 2006
- John A. Rice, Empress Marie Therese and Music at the Viennese Court, 1792–1807, Cambridge 2003
