= Prince Giuseppe of Naples and Sicily =

Italian prince (1781–1783)

Prince Giuseppe
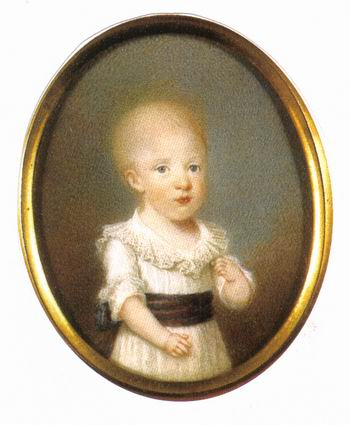
- Born: 18 June 1781; Royal Palace, Kingdom of Naples
- Died: 19 February 1783 (aged 1); Caserta Palace, Kingdom of Naples
- Burial: Basilica of Santa Chiara
Names
- Italian: Giuseppe Carlo Gennaro
- House: Bourbon-Two Sicilies
- Father: Ferdinand IV of Naples
- Mother: Maria Carolina of Austria

Prince Giuseppe of Naples and Sicily (Giuseppe Carlo Gennaro; 18 June 1781 – 19 February 1783) was the first "Prince of Naples and Sicily". The title was later conferred by Joseph Bonaparte to be hereditary on his children and grandchildren.

== Biography ==
Prince Giuseppe (Joseph) was born at the Royal Palace of Naples to King Ferdinand IV of Naples and his consort Maria Carolina of Austria, daughter of Empress Maria Theresa.

A member of the House of Bourbon, he was a Prince of Naples and Sicily by birth.

He was the ninth child of his parents and their fourth son. At the time of his birth, he was third in line to the throne after his brother Prince Francis, then Duke of Calabria and Prince Gennaro. His oldest brother Carlo, Duke of Calabria (d.1778) died of smallpox aged 3 and the next in line, Francis became heir apparent.

His sisters included the future Holy Roman Empress, Grand Duchess of Tuscany. His younger sister, Princess Maria Cristina, was the wife of the future Charles Felix of Sardinia and Queen of Sardinia. Another sister was the Queen of the French and the youngest was the future Princess of Asturias.

His cousins included a Duke of Parma, Grand Duke of Tuscany, Holy Roman Emperor, Queen of Portugal, King of Spain, a Duchess of Calabria, the first wife of his older brother Ferdinand.

At the age of 20 months the prince caught smallpox which eventually killed him. He died at the Caserta Palace and was buried at the Basilica of Santa Chiara, Naples.

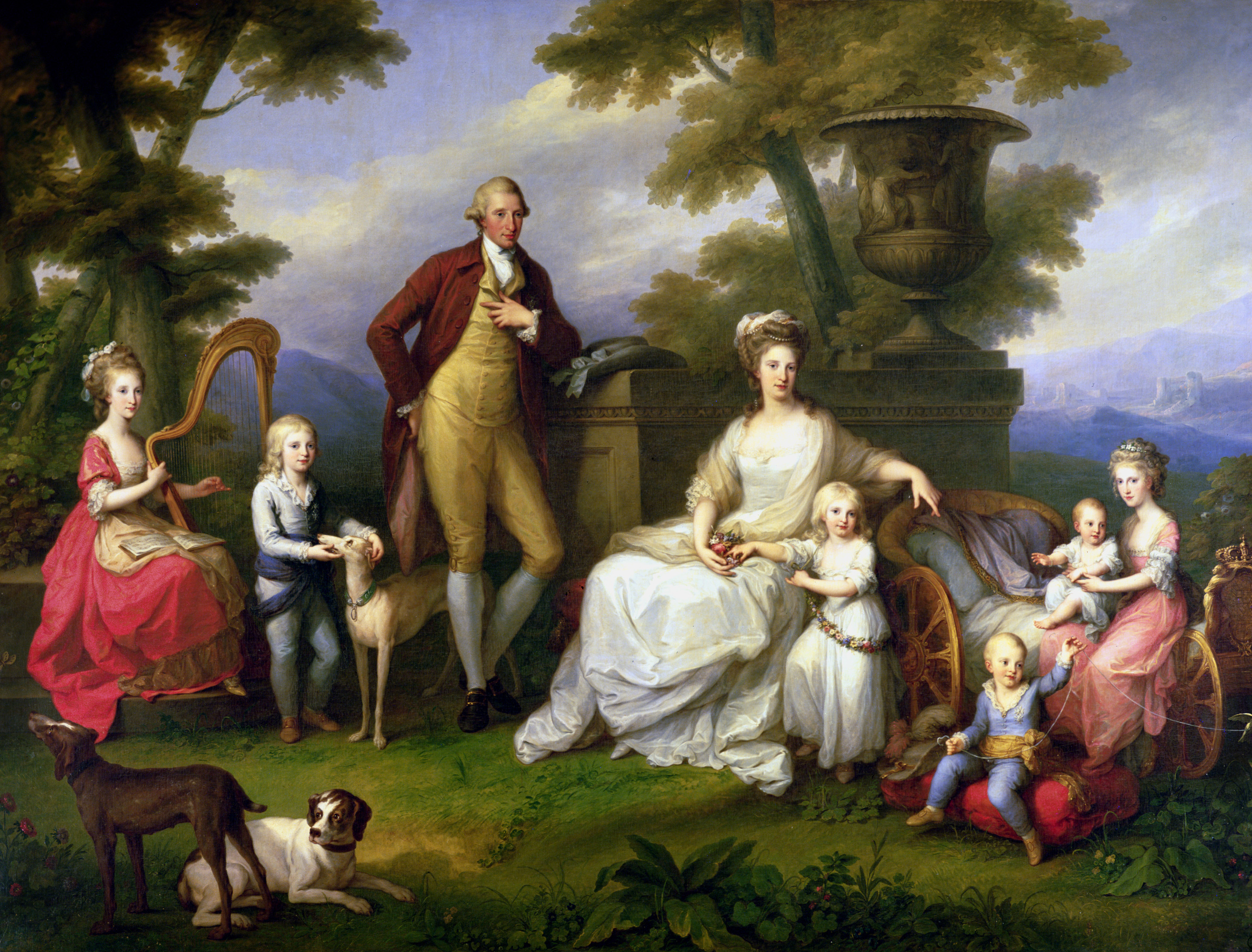
Family of Giuseppe in 1783
The Royal Family of Naples and Sicily in 1783, Angelica Kauffman; (L-R) Princess Maria Teresa; the future King Prince Francis; his father King Ferdinand; his mother Maria Carolina of Austria holding Princess Maria Cristina; Prince Gennaro (died in 1789); Princess Maria Amalia in the arms of Princess Luisa; the royal couple’s seventh child was stillborn during the preparation phase for the painting. The artist then painted a veil over the child already in the cradle, which had been clearly visible in the modello.

== Ancestry ==
Ancestors of Prince Giuseppe of Naples and Sicily

8. Philip V of Spain
4. Charles III of Spain
9. Elisabeth Farnese
2. Ferdinand I of the Two Sicilies
10. Augustus III of Poland
5. Maria Amalia of Saxony
11. Maria Josepha of Austria
1. Prince Giuseppe of Naples and Sicily
12. Leopold, Duke of Lorraine
6. Francis I, Holy Roman Emperor
13. Élisabeth Charlotte of Orléans
3. Maria Carolina of Austria
14. Charles VI, Holy Roman Emperor
7. Maria Theresa of Austria
15. Elisabeth Christine of Brunswick
