= Maria Anna of Naples and Sicily =

Sicilian princess (1775–1780)

Princess Maria Anna
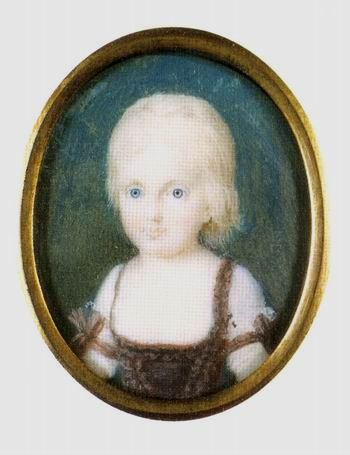
- Born: 23 November 1775; Royal Palace, Naples
- Died: 22 February 1780 (aged 4 years, 2 months); Royal Palace, Naples
- Burial: March 1780; Santa Chiara
Names
- Maria Anna Giuseppa Antonietta Francesca Gaetana Teresa Amalia Clementina
- House: Bourbon-Two Sicilies
- Father: Ferdinand I of the Two Sicilies
- Mother: Maria Carolina of Austria
- Religion: Roman Catholicism

Princess Maria Anna of Naples and Sicily (Italian: Maria Anna Giuseppa Antonietta Francesca Gaetana Teresa Amalia Clementina; 23 November 1775 – 22 February 1780) was a member of the Spanish Royal Family (branched out to the Kingdom of the Two Sicilies).

== Early life ==
Maria Anna was born at the Royal Palace in Naples. Her father was Ferdinand, Duke of Calabria, the third son and ninth child of Charles III of Spain and Maria Amalia of Saxony. Her mother was the Archduchess of Austria, the tenth daughter and thirteenth child of the famous Maria Theresa of Austria and her husband, Francis I, Holy Roman Emperor. She was baptised during the first year of her life. Her full name was Maria Anna Giuseppa Antoinette Francesca Gaetana Teresa Amalia Clementina, her first four names were the same as her mother's eldest sister Archduchess Maria Anna of Austria (1738-1789). She was born and died while her father was still styled Duke of Calabria. She was then styled Princess of Naples and Sicily. Her older siblings were Maria Theresa, namesake of her grandmother, born in 1772; Maria Luisa, born in 1773 and Carlo, Duke of Calabria, born just ten months before her. He also died in childhood, yet Maria Anna outlived him.

== Death ==
Due to the fact that Maria Anna was born just ten months after her older brother Carlo Francesco Giuseppe Gennaro, her birth was extremely difficult for Maria Carolina, and thus for the baby too. She was a very frail and weak child. Her health was reason for debate and when her brother Carlo, Duke of Calabria became ill with smallpox, he was immediately transferred to the Caserta Palace in order to prevent Maria Anna from getting sick, too. Carlo eventually succumbed to the illness on 17 December 1778, aged just three. In 1778, against all efforts, she contracted smallpox. She rallied for a while, but died on 22 February 1780.

== Ancestry ==
Ancestors of Maria Anna of Naples and Sicily

8. Philip V of Spain
4. Charles III of Spain
9. Elisabeth Farnese
2. Ferdinand I of the Two Sicilies
10. Augustus III of Poland
5. Maria Amalia of Saxony
11. Maria Josepha of Austria
1. Maria Anna of Naples and Sicily
12. Leopold, Duke of Lorraine
6. Francis I, Holy Roman Emperor
13. Élisabeth Charlotte of Orléans
3. Maria Carolina of Austria
14. Charles VI, Holy Roman Emperor
7. Maria Theresa of Austria
15. Elisabeth Christine of Brunswick
