= Maria Carolina of Austria =

Queen of Naples and Sicily from 1768 to 1814

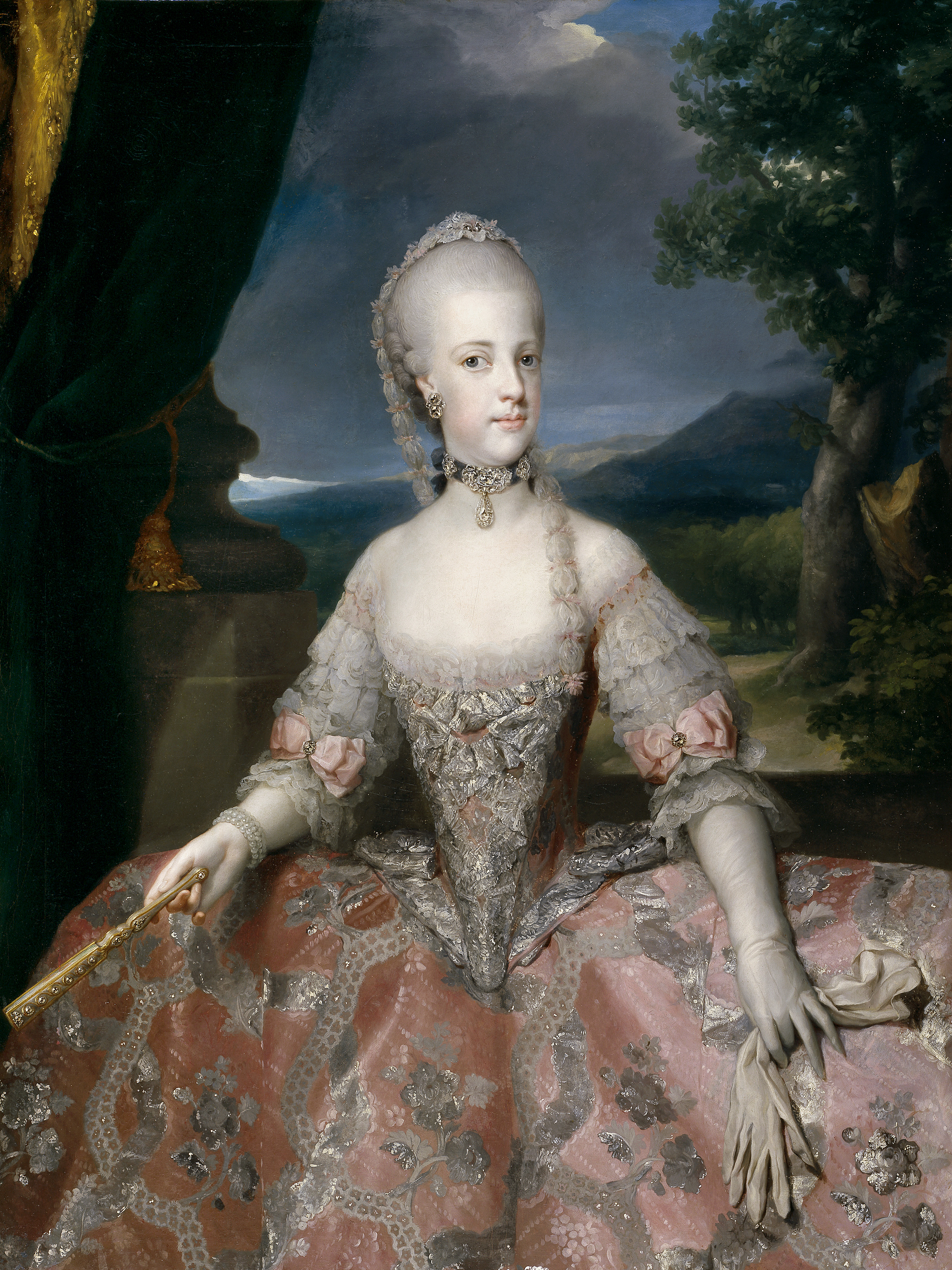
- Portrait by Anton Raphael Mengs c. 1728–1779

Queen consort of Naples
- Tenure: 12 May 1768 – 23 January 1799; 13 June 1799 – 30 March 1806

Queen consort of Sicily
- Tenure: 12 May 1768 – 8 September 1814
- Born: 13 August 1752; Schönbrunn Palace, Vienna, Archduchy of Austria, Holy Roman Empire
- Died: 8 September 1814 (aged 62); Hetzendorf Palace, Vienna, Austrian Empire
- Burial: Imperial Crypt, Vienna
- Spouse: Ferdinand IV and III (m. 1768)
- Issue more...: See: Maria Theresa, Holy Roman Empress; Luisa Maria, Grand Duchess of Tuscany; Francis I, King of the Two Sicilies; Maria Cristina, Queen of Sardinia; Maria Amalia, Queen of the French; Maria Antonia, Princess of Asturias; Leopold, Prince of Salerno
Names
- German: Maria Karolina Luise Josepha Johanna Antonia; Italian: Maria Carolina Luisa Giuseppa Giovanna Antonia; English: Mary Caroline Louisa Josepha Joanna Antonia
- House: Habsburg-Lorraine
- Father: Francis I, Holy Roman Emperor
- Mother: Maria Theresa

Maria Carolina of Austria (Maria Karolina Luise Josepha Johanna Antonia; 13 August 1752 – 8 September 1814) was Queen of Naples and Sicily as the wife of King Ferdinand IV and III, who later became King of the Two Sicilies. As de facto ruler of her husband's kingdoms, Maria Carolina oversaw the promulgation of many reforms, including the revocation of the ban on Freemasonry, the enlargement of the navy under her favourite, Sir John Acton, and the expulsion of Spanish influence. She was a proponent of enlightened absolutism until the advent of the French Revolution, when, in order to prevent its ideas gaining currency, she made Naples a police state.

Born an archduchess of Austria, the thirteenth child of Empress Maria Theresa and Holy Roman Emperor Francis I, Maria Carolina married Ferdinand as part of an Austrian alliance with Spain, of which Ferdinand's father was king. Following the birth of a male heir in 1775, Maria Carolina was admitted to the Privy Council. She dominated the Council until 1812, when she was sent back to Vienna. Like her mother, Maria Carolina arranged politically advantageous marriages for her children. Maria Carolina promoted Naples as a centre of the arts, patronising painters Jacob Philipp Hackert and Angelica Kauffman, and academics Gaetano Filangieri, Domenico Cirillo and Giuseppe Maria Galanti.

Maria Carolina, abhorring how the French treated their queen, her sister Marie Antoinette, allied Naples with Britain and Austria during the Napoleonic and French Revolutionary Wars. As a result of a failed Neapolitan invasion of French-occupied Rome, she fled to Sicily with her husband in December 1798. One month later, the Parthenopean Republic was declared, which repudiated Bourbon rule in Naples for six months. Deposed as Queen of Naples for a second time by French forces, in 1806, Maria Carolina died in Vienna in 1814, a year before her husband's restoration to Naples.

Maria Carolina was the last surviving child of Maria Theresia. She was also the last queen of Naples and Sicily before the unification of the two into the Kingdom of the Two Sicilies.

== Early life ==
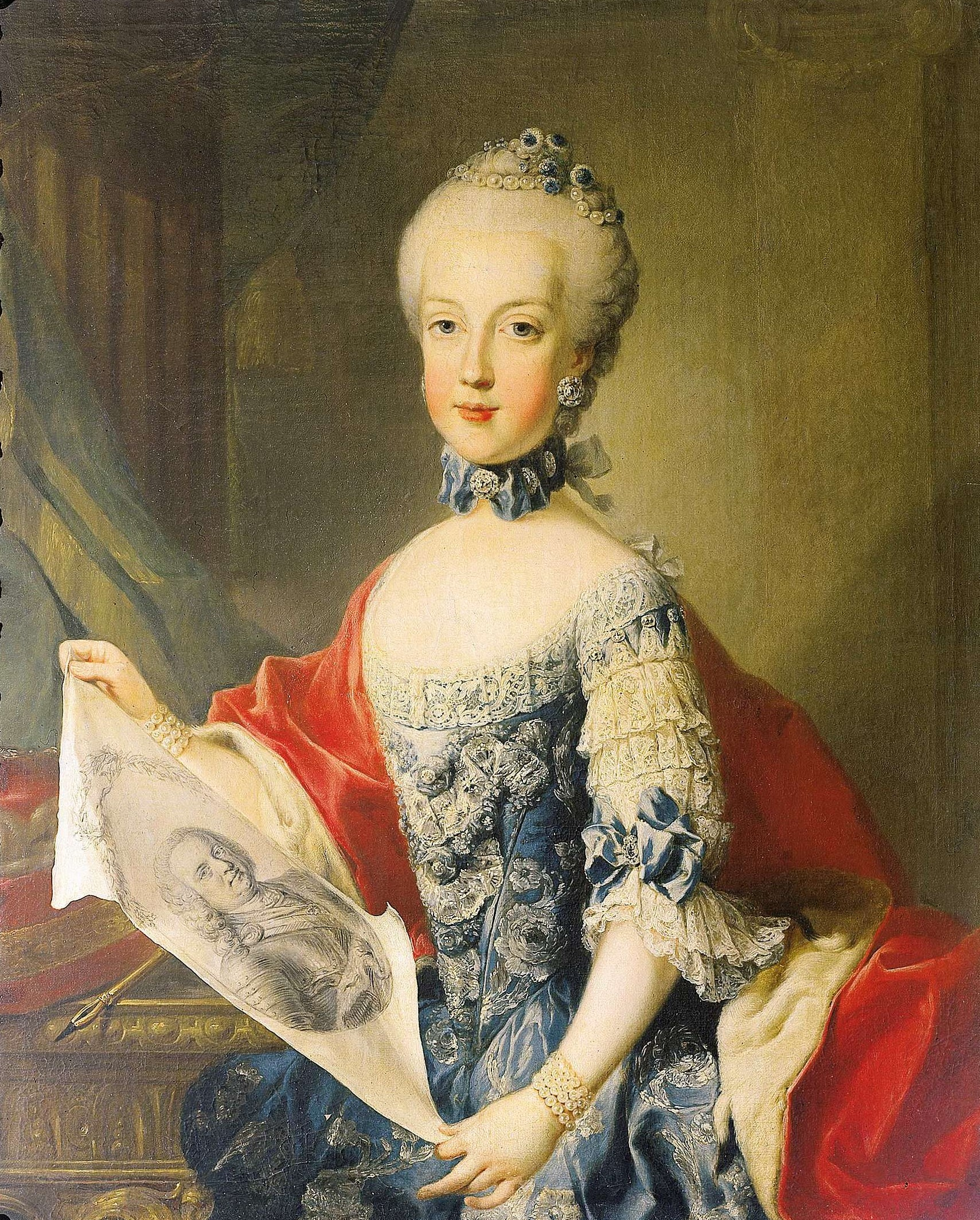
Archduchess Maria Carolina holding a portrait of her father, Francis I, Holy Roman Emperor

Born on 13 August 1752 at the Schönbrunn Palace in Vienna, Maria Carolina Luise Josepha Johanna Antonia was the thirteenth and sixth surviving child of Maria Theresa, Queen of Hungary and Bohemia and ruler of the Habsburg dominions, and Francis I, Holy Roman Emperor. She was a namesake of her elder sisters – Maria Carolina, who died two weeks after her first birthday, and Maria Carolina, who died several hours after being baptised – but she was known as Charlotte by her family. Her godparents were King Louis XV of France and his wife, Maria Leszczyńska. Maria Carolina was the daughter who resembled her mother most, inheriting her strong-willed and dominant personality.

Maria Carolina formed a very close bond with her youngest sister, Maria Antonia. From very early on they shared the same governess, Countess Lerchenfeld. A testament to their closeness is the fact that when one caught an illness the other did too. In August 1767 Maria Theresia separated the two girls, hitherto raised together under the auspices of Countess Marie von Brandis, because of their bad behaviour. Soon after in October of the same year, Maria Carolina's sister Maria Josepha, destined to marry Ferdinand IV of Naples as part of an alliance with Spain, died during a smallpox epidemic before she could leave for Naples to marry him. Just five years earlier, Maria Josepha's older sister, Maria Johanna was previously engaged to the young king, but she too had died from smallpox. Anxious to save the Austro-Spanish alliance, Charles III of Spain, father of Ferdinand IV, requested one of Maria Josepha's sisters as a replacement. The empress offered the court of Madrid, negotiating on behalf of that of Naples, Maria Amalia or Maria Carolina. Because Maria Amalia was five years older than his son, Charles III opted for the latter. Maria Carolina reacted badly to her engagement, crying, entreating and saying that Neapolitan marriages were unlucky, considering that two of her sisters had died before they could marry Ferdinand. Her objections, however, did not delay her preparation for her new role as Queen of Naples by the Countess of Lerchenfeld. Nine months later, on 7 April 1768, Maria Carolina married Ferdinand IV of Naples by proxy, her brother Ferdinand representing the bride-groom.

== Early reign ==
The fifteen-year-old Queen of Naples journeyed at leisure from Vienna to Naples, making stops at Mantua, Bologna, Florence, and Rome on the way. She entered the Kingdom of Naples on 12 May 1768, disembarking at Terracina, where she took leave of her native attendants. From Terracina, she and her remaining suite, comprising her brother, the Grand Duke of Tuscany, and his wife Maria Luisa of Spain, ventured to Poztella, where she met her husband, whom she found "very ugly". To the Countess of Lerchenfeld, she wrote, "I love him only out of duty..." Ferdinand was not taken with her either, declaring, after their first night together, "She sleeps like the dead and sweats like a pig."

Maria Carolina’s dislike of her husband, however, did not get in the way of her bearing children, as her most important wifely duty was to perpetuate the dynasty. In total, Maria Carolina bore Ferdinand eighteen children within twenty-one years, from 1772 to 1793. Seven of these children survived into adulthood including his successor, Francis I, the last Holy Roman Empress, a Grand Duchess of Tuscany, the last Queen of the French, and a Princess of Asturias.

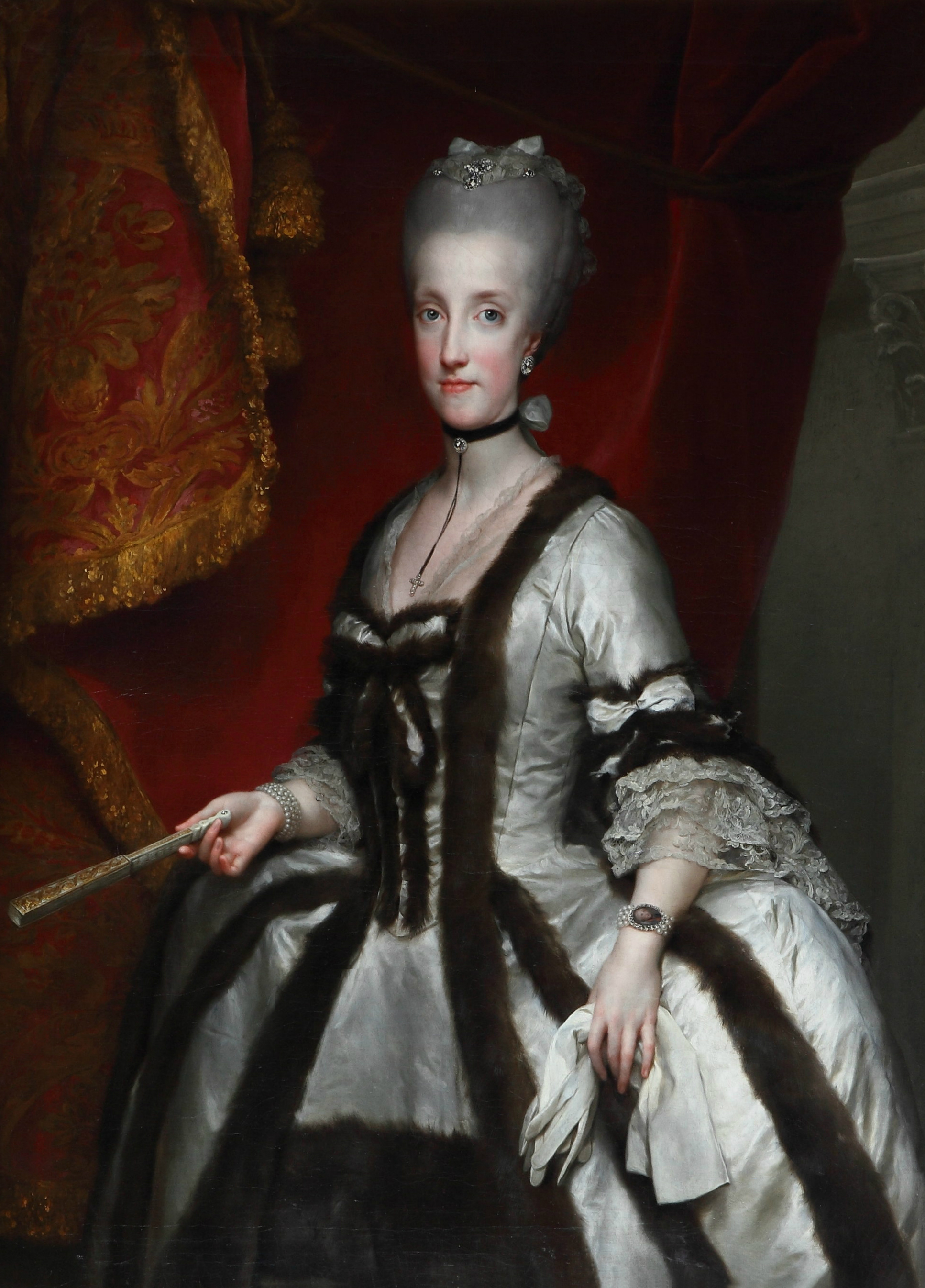
Portrait of Maria Carolina (by Anton Raphael Mengs, c. 1772–1773)

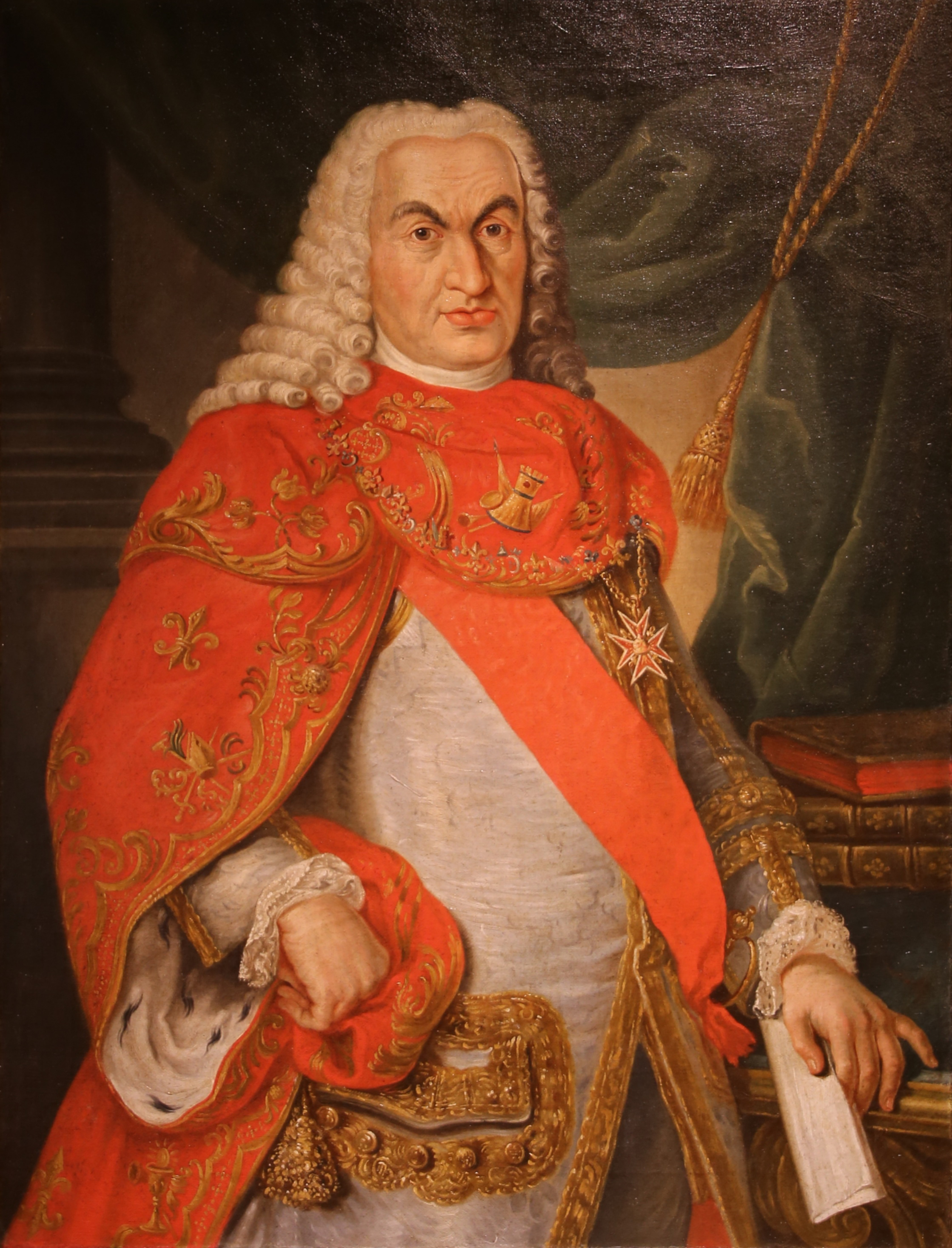
Marquis Bernardo Tanucci, de facto ruler of Naples and Sicily from 1759 until 1776

=== Fall of Tanucci ===
Ferdinand, having received a lacklustre education from the Prince of San Nicandro, lacked the ability to rule, relying completely on his father Charles III of Spain's (Note: Charles III was King of Naples and Sicily from 1734 until 1759, when his half-brother, Ferdinand VI, died.) counsel, communicated by Bernardo Tanucci. Pursuant to Empress Maria Theresia’s instructions, Maria Carolina gained Ferdinand's trust by feigning interest in his favourite activity—hunting. With it, she obtained a back door to the administration of the state, to be fully realised only by the birth of an heir in 1775, and her consequent admission to the Privy Council. Until then, Maria Carolina presided over the rejuvenation of Neapolitan court life, largely neglected since the advent of her husband's regency. Academics Gaetano Filangieri, Domenico Cirillo, and Giuseppe Maria Galanti frequented her salon, among others.

Tanucci's fall from grace came about over an argument with Maria Carolina regarding Freemasonry, of which she was an adherent. Acting on orders from Charles III, Tanucci revived a law from 1751 banning Freemasonry in response to the discovery of a Masonic lodge among the royal regiment. Angered, the queen expressed to Charles III her opinion that Tanucci was ruining the country through the medium of a letter written by her husband, thus making it look as if it was his idea. Resigned to the queen's wishes, Ferdinand dismissed Tanucci in October 1776, causing a rift with his father. The appointment of Tanucci's successor, the Marquis of Sambuca, Maria Carolina's powerless puppet, represented the end of Spanish influence in Naples, hitherto virtually a province of that country. Maria Carolina proceeded to alienate large swaths of the nobility by replacing the influence of Spain with that of Austria. Her unpopularity among the nobility was increased by her attempts to curb their prerogative.

=== Acton and the military ===
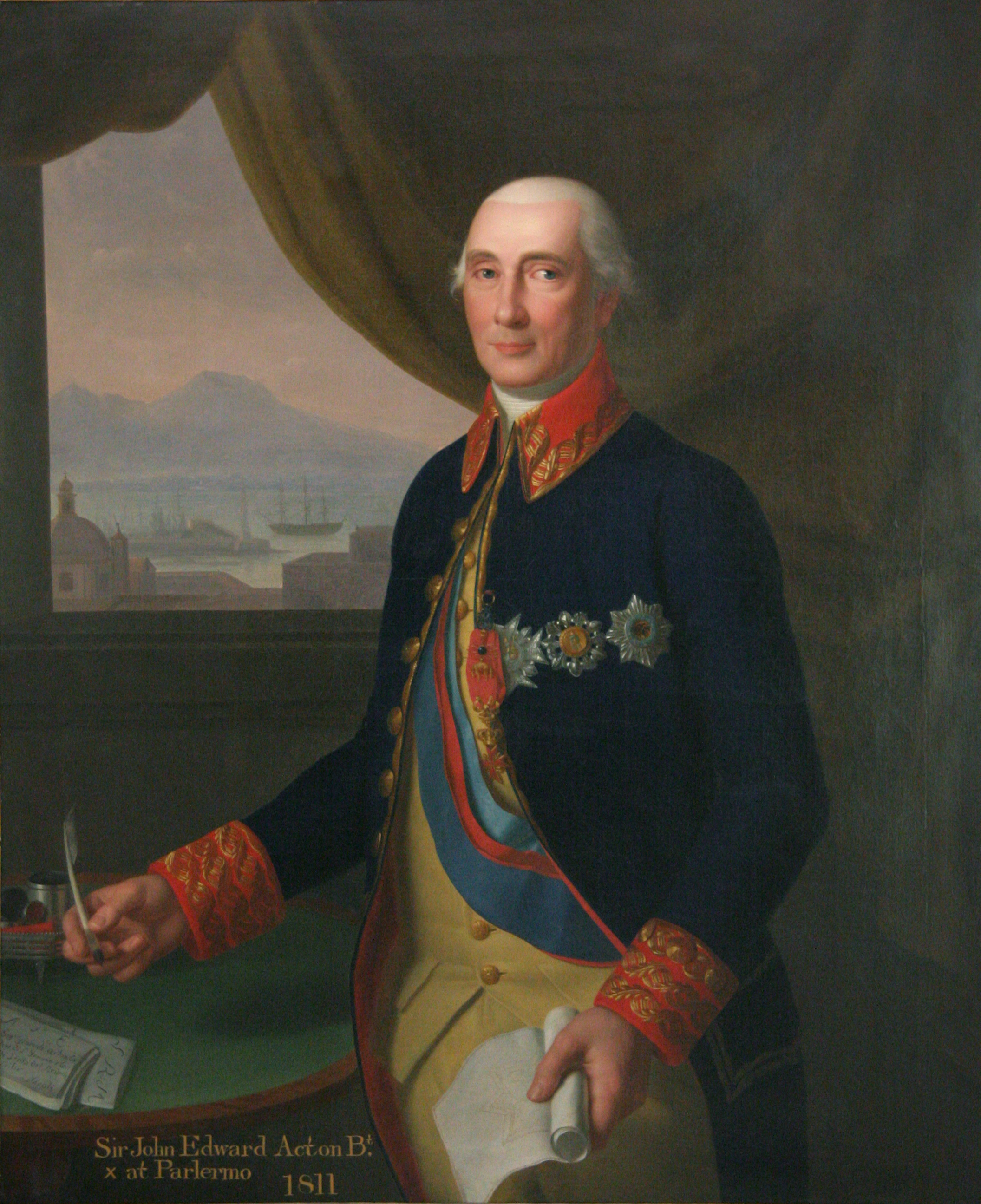
Sir John Acton, Maria Carolina's favourite, from a painting by Emanuele Napoli

Without Tanucci in government, the queen alone ruled Naples and Sicily, assisted by her French-born, English favourite, Sir John Acton, from 1778 onwards. Acting on her brother the Holy Roman Emperor Joseph II's advice, Maria Carolina and Acton revamped the Neapolitan navy, then neglected, opening 4 marine colleges and commissioning 150 ships of various sizes. The merchant navy, too, was augmented by trade pacts with Russia and Genoa. Charles III, having declared war on Great Britain in alliance with the United States, was angered by Acton's appointment to the Ministry of War and of Marine because he felt his Spanish candidate, Don Antonio Otero, was more worthy of such a high government post by virtue of the fact he was not English. Maria Carolina once again replied using a letter written by the king, expounding to Charles III that Acton, the son of a French woman, was not English and that he was appointed before Spanish hostilities with Britain broke out. Charles's attacks against Acton only served to endear the latter more to the queen, who proceeded to appoint him Field-Marshal. Acton's reforms were not restricted to the expansion of the navy; at the same time, he cut the expenditure of his department by 500,000 ducats and invited foreign drill-sergeants and officers to fill vacancies in the army. Acton and Maria Carolina were seen to have become so close by 1782 that, according to the Sardinian ambassador in Naples, people falsely believed they were lovers. That the rumour was untrue was not known to the king, who tried several times to "surprise you together" and threatened to kill them both in a rage. In response, Maria Carolina set spies on her husband, but a reconciliation was soon achieved. As part of this rapprochement, Acton went to live in Castellamare, but returned to Naples three times a week to see the queen.

=== Artistic patronage and the death of Charles III ===
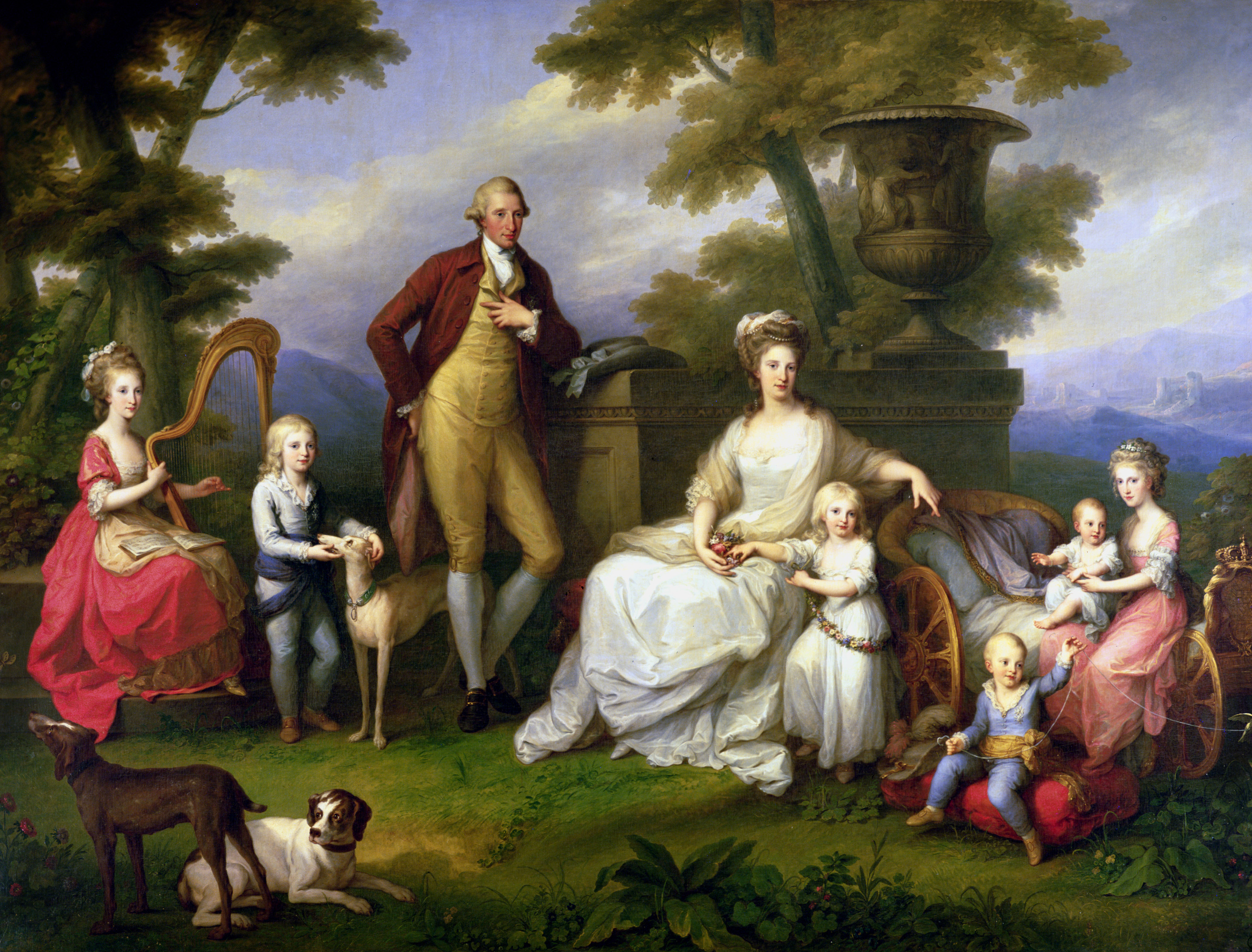
Ferdinand I and His Family, by Angelica Kauffman. This portrait represents a break with typical depictions of the Bourbons, incorporating an Arcadian landscape and simple poses

Maria Carolina patronised German-Swiss artists, foremostly Angelica Kauffman, who famously painted the queen's family in an informal garden setting in 1783, and gave her daughters lessons in drawing. Maria Carolina showered Kauffman with gifts, but she preferred the artistic circles in Rome to Naples. The queen's patronage was not restricted to portrait painters: she allotted landscape painter Jacob Philipp Hackert a wing of the palace at Francavilla. Like Kauffman, he gave lessons to the queen's children and enjoyed her confidence. On recommendation from Hackert, the king and queen restored the statues of Palazzo Farnese and brought them to Naples. In 1784, the queen established the philanthropic San Leucio colony, a village with its own unique laws and customs whose sole object was to weave silk. She also commissioned ornamental snuff boxes and jewellery from goldsmiths.

In 1788, with the death of King Charles III, Neapolitan-Spanish relations improved. The new king, Charles IV, was eager to be on good terms with his brother, the King of Naples, sending the Spanish fleet to salute to him. To consolidate their reconciliation, Charles IV proposed that his daughter marry the king and queen's eldest son, the Duke of Calabria. While the king supported the match, Maria Carolina shunned it. Like her mother, she had carefully chosen the prospective husbands and wives of her children, matches that were to cement political alliances of her choosing. The death of the queen's nephew Crown Prince Francis of Austria's wife, Duchess Elisabeth of Württemberg, afforded her an opportunity to fulfil her marital ambitions. Her daughters Maria Theresa and Luisa married Crown Prince Francis and Ferdinand III, Grand Duke of Tuscany, respectively, during the Neapolitan royal family's visit to Vienna in 1790.

== End of enlightened absolutism ==
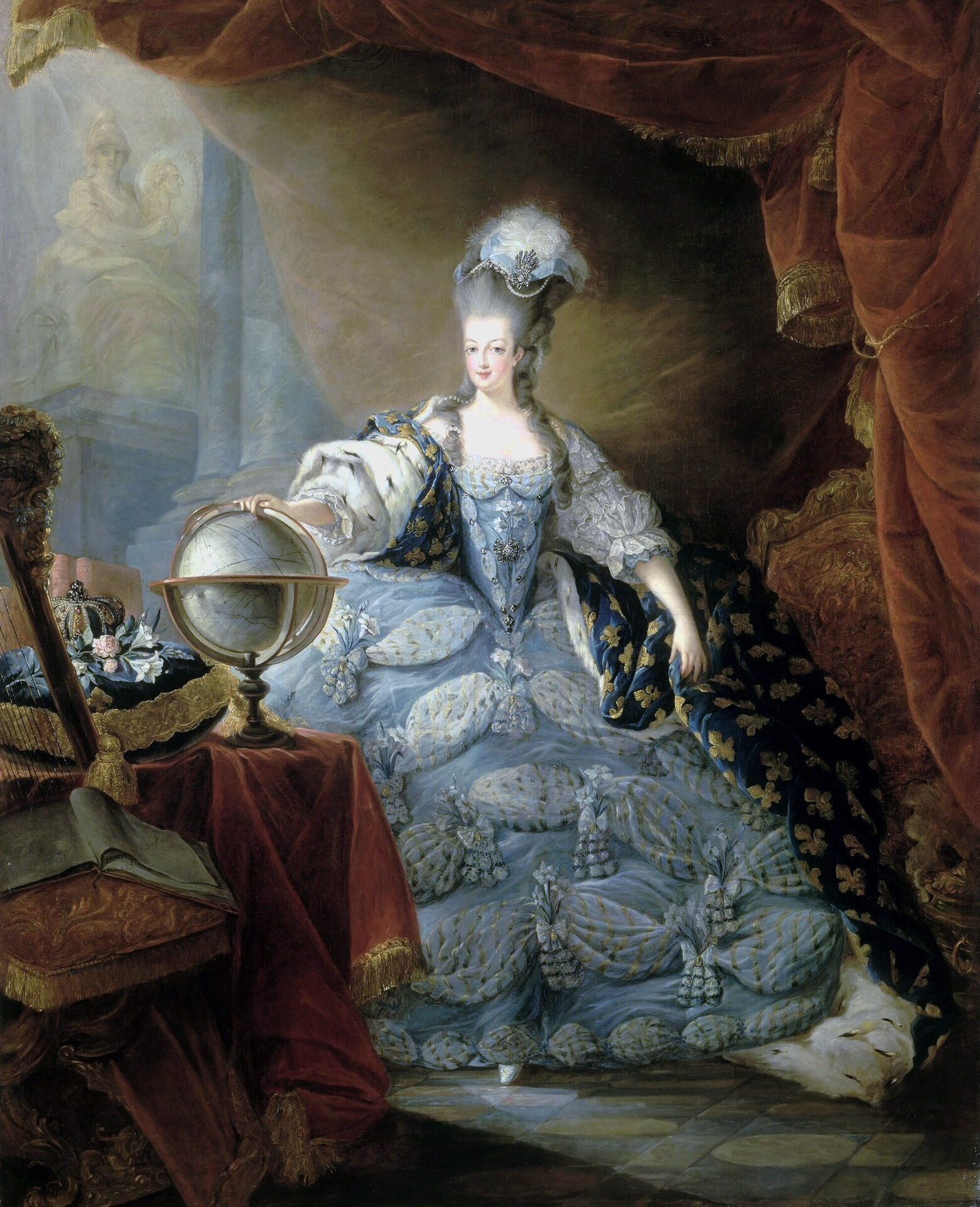
Marie Antoinette, Queen of France, here depicted by Jean-Baptiste Gautier Dagoty, was Maria Carolina's favourite sister. It was as a response to her treatment by the French that Maria Carolina allied Naples with Britain during the French Revolutionary Wars

Maria Carolina was anxious to improve Neapolitan-Papal relations, which had deteriorated owing to arguments with Pope Pius VI over ecclesiastical laws and the investiture and choice of bishops. Consequently, Naples had stopped paying its annual tribute of 7,000 ducats. (Note: The Kingdom of Naples was nominally a Papal fief.) Therefore, Maria Carolina arranged a meeting with the pope. To emphasise their desire to see him, the king and queen arrived in Rome, en route to Naples from Vienna, earlier than expected, where they were greeted by Pius VI in a private audience. The pope agreed to cede to the king the right of appointing bishops to vacant sees. Thus, because the king and queen had not made any concessions in return, the prestige of Naples was augmented. On leaving, Maria Carolina was presented with the Golden Rose, a great mark of Papal favour.

The return from Vienna marked a new epoch in the politics of Naples. Alarmed by developments in France, especially in regards to her favourite sister, Marie Antoinette, (Note: In Rome, Maria Carolina met the Mesdames de France, the last two surviving daughters of King Louis XV, who had sought refuge from the turmoil engulfing France there. From them, Maria Carolina learned of her sister's maltreatment at the hands of the French.) Maria Carolina ended her experiment in enlightened absolutism and started on a reactionary course. She rejected the French Revolution and was determined to prevent its ideology gaining prevalence in Naples. She did this by sub-dividing Naples into twelve police wards, controlled by government-appointed commissioners, replacing the popularly elected alderman system. The effectiveness of the wards was increased by the creation of a secret police force, which had in its pay spies of every class. It was through her secret police that Maria Carolina learned of her substantial decline in popularity among all classes of society.

In an attempt to please Great Britain, with a military alliance in mind, the queen deigned to meet the wife of the English ambassador, Emma Hamilton, in audience, despite the fact that the British Queen, Charlotte of Mecklenburg-Strelitz, had not yet received her. (Note: At the time, there was a convention that disbarred women from being received by a foreign sovereign if they had not been received by their native one.) However, they soon struck up a friendship, Emma singing duets with the king and dining privately with the royal family. The queen, whom Emma thought "most excellent and strictly good and upright", was drawn closer to Emma by her willingness to betray Britain's diplomatic secrets.

=== The Sémonville affair and the First Coalition ===
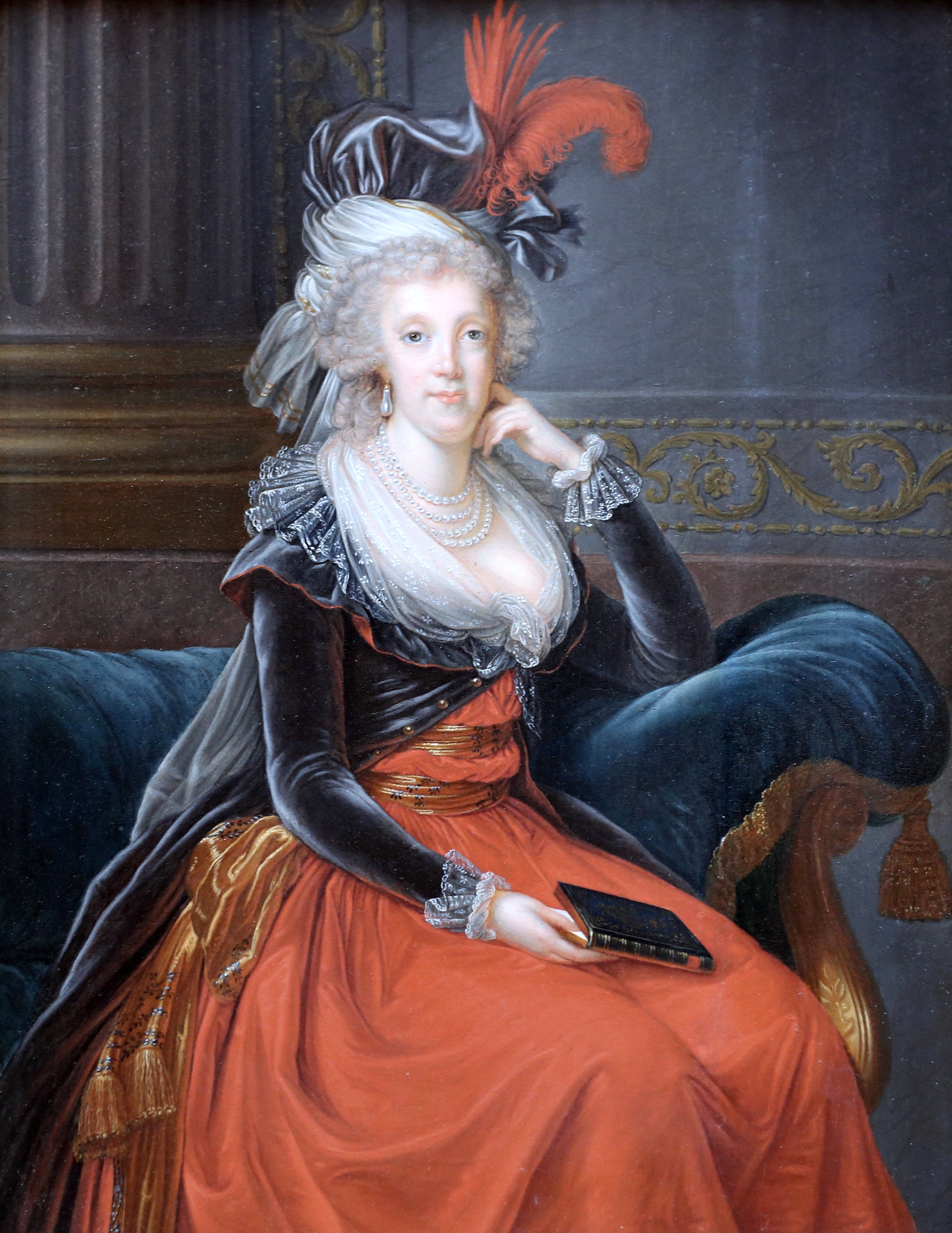
Maria Carolina as she appeared in 1791, in a painting by Élisabeth-Louise Vigée-Le Brun. She strongly resembles her sister, Marie Antoinette

King Louis XVI of France and Queen Marie Antoinette were arrested on 10 August 1792. Hence, the Neapolitan government refused to recognise French diplomatist Baron Armand de Mackau's recently arrived legation. Queen Maria Carolina was so horrified at what had happened at the Tuileries that day that she almost broke off relations with France altogether. The king and queen's procrastination regarding Mackau's requests to be recognised as a representative of the French Republic (Note: The French monarchy had just been abolished, on 21 September 1792.) caused tension with that country. John Acton, now Prime Minister of Naples, allayed Maria Carolina's fervent desire to go to war with France and tried to placate Mackau until he could rely on British military support. His plan, however, backfired when the French government intercepted a letter detailing how he sabotaged the diplomatic mission of Huguet de Sémonville to the Ottoman Empire. When France started making preparations for war in November to avenge this insult, the king and queen finally capitulated and begrudgingly recognized Mackau and the Republic. However, the national assembly had already sent 9 ships under Admiral Latouche-Tréville to seek redress, which arrived on 17 December in Naples. Latouche stipulated that, if Acton did not apologise to him in person for the Sémonville affair, he would bombard and lay waste to Naples within an hour. The queen's decision to accede to Latouche's demands earned her the criticism of some Neapolitan historians, like General Colletta, who overlook the fact that Naples was unable to mount a defence at the time as the navy was not mobilised.

Maria Carolina's preventatives against Jacobinism were rendered useless in the face of the subversive actives of Latouche's fleet, which was obliged to return to Naples shortly after leaving by a storm. The French sailors, "republican agents", were allowed to land on this occasion, inculcating their anti-monarchical sentiments in the Neapolitans. Upon Latouche's departure, on 29 January 1793, Maria Carolina launched an ineffective offensive against Neapolitan radicals, allowing the most dangerous schemers to escape justice. Why the offensive failed can be explained by the fact that her chief of police, Luigi de' Medici, was secretly a radical himself. Concurrently, Maria Carolina arranged a treaty of alliance with Great Britain, on whom France had latterly declared war. By this treaty, Naples was to contribute four men-of-war, four frigates and four smaller ships, along with six thousand soldiers, to protect commerce in the Mediterranean. In August 1793, following the Siege of Toulon, Naples joined the First Coalition, comprising Great Britain, Russia, Austria, Prussia, Spain, Portugal and Savoy-Sardinia, against France.

=== Italian campaign ===
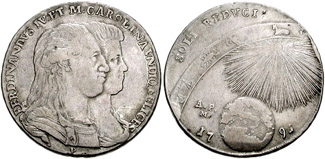
The effigies of Maria Carolina and her husband on a 1791 Neapolitan piastra

The execution of Marie Antoinette in October 1793 breathed a new lease of life into the queen's counter-revolution. Maria Carolina was so horrified by that event that she refused to speak French, "that monstrous language", and banned the "inflammatory" philosophical works of Galanti and Filangeri, who had hitherto enjoyed the queen's patronage. In 1794, following the discovery of a Jacobin plot to overthrow the government, Maria Carolina ordered Medici to suppress the Freemasons, of which she was once an adherent, believing they were partaking in treasonable activities with the French. The army was kept perpetually mobilised in case of sudden attack, occasioning a huge increase in taxation. Fearing for the safety of her family, Maria Carolina employed food-testers and switched the royal families' apartments on a daily basis. What compelled Maria Carolina to do this was the general terror reigning throughout the city, in which "nobody was safe".

The cessation of Franco-Spanish hostilities in the summer of 1795 gave Napoleon Bonaparte, a Corsican general in the French army, the opportunity to focus on France's Italian Campaign. Bonaparte's successes in Northern Italy (Note: Napoleon had conquered Parma, Modena, Lombardy and the main fortresses of Piedmont in rapid succession.) compelled Maria Carolina to sue for peace, under which Naples had to pay to France a war indemnity of 8 million francs. However, neither country intended to observe this treaty in the long-term. The marriage of her eldest son, the Duke of Calabria, to Archduchess Maria Clementina of Austria in 1797 offered Maria Carolina a brief respite from the affairs of war, which had taken a toll on her health. Maria Carolina entered a secret defensive alliance with Austria on 20 May 1798, in response to France's occupation of the Papal States, which shared a border with Naples. After the British victory at the Battle of the Nile, the queen decided to join the Second Coalition against France; Austria sent General Mack to take command. War council meetings, comprising the queen, the king, Mack, Sir William Hamilton, the English ambassador, and Admiral Nelson, the victor of the Nile, were held in the Palace of Caserta. They decided to invade the Roman Republic, (Note: France had replaced the Papal States with a republic in February 1798.) a French puppet state.

=== Escape and creation of the Parthenopean Republic ===
When the Kingdom of Naples and Sicily joined the Second Coalition, Napoleon found a reason to act. The French General Jean-Étienne Championnet succeeded rapidly, and in January 1799 he occupied Naples and forced the royal family to escape to Sicily. In the Sicilian exile Maria Carolina continued her politics towards Naples.

Flag of the Parthenopean Republic

On 24 January 1799, the Parthenopean Republic was proclaimed in Naples by the French troops led by General Championnet. The chosen name (after Parthenope, an ancient Greek colony which existed on the site of the future city of Naples) was an attempt by the French to obtain the support of the Neapolitan people. During the republican period, a government was installed with Ercole D'Agnese as elected President, press freedom was proclaimed, and future reforms were prepared. However, after only 6 months, the young republic ended when the Sanfedisti, the army led by Cardinal Fabrizio Ruffo, attacked and invaded Naples (21 June 1799). The collapse of the republic was largely due to the English fleet, which had supplied the royal army with weapons. Again, it was Admiral Nelson who successfully defeated the French in the middle of 1799 from Naples and Sicily securing the throne for the Royal couple.

In June 1800, Maria Carolina traveled with her three unmarried daughters, her younger son Leopoldo, and accompanied by William and Emma Hamilton and Nelson over Livorno, Florence, Trieste, and Laibach to Vienna, where she arrived two months later. Maria Carolina stayed two years in her homeland, where she arranged advantageous marriages for her children. In the family circle, she spent most time with her favorite grandchild, Archduchess Marie Louise of Austria, who later became the wife of her arch-enemy Napoleon.

== Exile and death ==
Coat of arms of Maria Carolina as Queen of Naples and Sicily

After her stay in Vienna, Maria Carolina returned to Naples on 17 August 1802. It is said that Napoleon claimed that the queen was the only man in the Kingdom of Naples. The European states were concerned by Napoleon's growing power, which reached its peak with his Imperial coronation on 18 May 1804. By 1805 Italy was again the center of interest of the new Emperor, whose crown bore the inscription Rex totius Italiae. From then on, events came quickly and Maria Carolina was surprised by the news of the defeat of Austria in the Battle of Austerlitz (2 December 1805).

Napoleon then did not hesitate to conquer Naples and installed first his brother Joseph Bonaparte, and four years later his brother-in-law Joachim Murat, on the throne of Naples. The royal family was forced to flee to Sicily in February 1806. In their exile, the refugees relied on the help of Great Britain, but after the death of Admiral Nelson in the Battle of Trafalgar (21 October 1805), the British developed more and more aversion to Maria Carolina. Finally in 1813, her husband essentially (but not officially) abdicated and appointed their son Francis regent. This deprived her of any political influence, and the queen was forced to leave Sicily and return to Vienna.

During her trip, she received the news of Napoleon's defeat at the Battle of Leipzig on 19 October 1813. After a long journey through Constantinople, Odessa, Lviv, and Budapest, Maria Carolina finally arrived in Vienna in January 1814, where she began negotiations with Prince Metternich and her nephew, Emperor Francis I of Austria, for the restoration of her husband and herself to the Neapolitan throne. However, this never happened: Maria Carolina died on 8 September as a consequence of a stroke, without seeing the final defeat of Napoleon and the restoration of her husband by the Congress of Vienna. Her maid found the queen lying dead on the floor among scattered letters. Maria Carolina was the last surviving child of Empress Maria Theresia.

Maria Carolina was buried in the Imperial Crypt in Vienna. Her parents and most of her siblings are also buried there.

== Issue ==
Several of Maria Carolina’s young children succumbed to smallpox. Maria Carolina outlived all but four of her many offspring.

Children of Maria Carolina of Austria by Ferdinand IV of Naples
Name	Picture	Birth	Death	Notes
Maria Teresa Carolina Giuseppina		Royal Palace of Naples, 6 June 1772	Hofburg Imperial Palace, 13 April 1807	Named after her maternal grandmother Maria Theresa of Austria, she married her double first cousin Francis II, Holy Roman Emperor, in 1790; had issue, among them Emperor Ferdinand I of Austria, the Archduke Franz Karl of Austria and Marie Louise, Empress of the French.
Maria Luisa Amelia Teresa		Royal Palace of Naples, 27 July 1773	Hofburg Imperial Palace, 19 September 1802	Married her double first cousin Ferdinand III, Grand Duke of Tuscany; had issue.
Carlo Tito Francesco Giuseppe		Caserta Palace, 6 January 1775	Caserta Palace, 17 December 1778	Died of smallpox.
Maria Anna Giuseppa Antonietta Francesca Gaetana Teresa		Royal Palace of Naples, 23 November 1775	Royal Palace of Naples, 22 February 1780	Died of smallpox.
Francesco Gennaro Giuseppe Saverio Giovanni Battista		Naples, 14 August 1777	Naples, 8 November 1830	Married his double first cousin Archduchess Maria Clementina of Austria in 1797; had issue; married another first cousin Infanta Maria Isabella of Spain in 1802; had issue; was King of the Two Sicilies from 1825 to 1830.
Maria Cristina Teresa		Caserta Palace, 17 January 1779	Savona, 11 March 1849	Married Charles Felix of Sardinia in 1807; had no issue; it was she who ordered the excavations of Tusculum.
Gennaro Carlo Francesco		Royal Palace of Naples, 12 April 1780	Caserta Palace, 2 January 1789	Died of smallpox.
Giuseppe Carlo Gennaro		Royal Palace of Naples, 18 June 1781	Caserta Palace, 19 February 1783	Died of smallpox.
Maria Amelia Teresa		Caserta Palace, 26 April 1782	Claremont House, 24 March 1866	Married Louis Philippe d'Orléans, Duke of Orléans in 1809; had issue; Queen of the French 1830–1848; died in exile in England.
Maria Carolina		Caserta Palace, 19 July 1783	Caserta Palace, 19 July 1783	Stillborn.
Maria Antonietta Teresa Amelia Giovanna Battista Francesca Gaetana Maria Anna Lucia		Caserta Palace, 14 December 1784	Royal Palace of Aranjuez, 21 May 1806	Married her cousin Infante Ferdinand, Prince of Asturias; died from tuberculosis; had no issue.
Maria Clotilde Teresa Amelia Antonietta Giovanna Battista Anna Gaetana Polcheria		Caserta Palace, 18 February 1786	Caserta Palace, 10 September 1792	Died of smallpox.
Maria Enrichetta Carmela		Royal Palace of Naples, 31 July 1787	Caserta Palace, 20 September 1792	Died of smallpox.
Carlo Gennaro		Naples, 26 August 1788	Caserta Palace, 1 February 1789	Died of smallpox.
Leopoldo Giovanni Giuseppe Michele of Naples		Naples, 2 July 1790	Naples, 10 March 1851	Married his niece Archduchess Clementina of Austria; had issue.
Alberto Lodovico Maria Filipo Gaetano		Royal Palace of Naples, 2 May 1792	Died on board HMS Vanguard, 25 December 1798	Died in childhood (died of exhaustion on board HMS Vanguard).
Maria Isabella		Naples, 2 December 1793	Naples, 23 April 1801	Died in childhood.

== Ancestry ==
Ancestors of Maria Carolina of Austria

8. Charles V, Duke of Lorraine
4. Leopold, Duke of Lorraine
9. Eleonore of Austria
2. Francis I, Holy Roman Emperor
10. Philippe I, Duke of Orléans
5. Élisabeth Charlotte of Orléans
11. Elizabeth Charlotte of the Palatinate
1. Maria Carolina of Austria
12. Leopold I, Holy Roman Emperor
6. Charles VI, Holy Roman Emperor
13. Eleonore Magdalene of Neuburg
3. Maria Theresa of Austria
14. Louis Rudolph, Duke of Brunswick
7. Elisabeth Christine of Brunswick
15. Christine Louise of Oettingen-Oettingen

== In popular culture ==
Maria Carolina has occasionally been portrayed on film. Examples include Norma Drury in That Hamilton Woman (1941) and Gabriella Pession in Ferdinando and Carolina (1999).

== Notes ==
Maria Carolina of Austria House of Habsburg-Lorraine Cadet branch of the House of Lorraine Born: 13 August 1752 Died: 8 September 1814
Italian royalty
Vacant Title last held by Maria Amalia of Saxony	Queen consort of Naples; 12 May 1768 – 23 January 1799	Vacant Parthenopaean Republic
Vacant Title last held by Maria Amalia of Saxony	Queen consort of Sicily; 12 May 1768 – 8 September 1814	Vacant Title next held by María Isabella of Spain as Queen of the Two Sicilies
Vacant Parthenopaean Republic	Queen consort of Naples; 13 June 1799 – 30 March 1806	Vacant Title next held by Julie Clary
