= Prince Gennaro of Naples and Sicily =

Italian prince (1780–1789)

Prince Gennaro
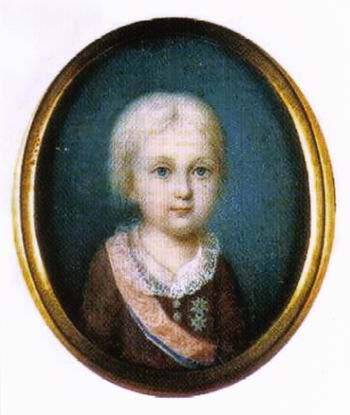
- Born: 12 April 1780; Royal Palace of Naples, Naples
- Died: 1 January 1789 (aged 8); Caserta Palace, Kingdom of Naples
- Burial: Basilica of Santa Chiara
Names
- Gennaro Carlo Francesco di Borbone
- House: Bourbon-Two Sicilies
- Father: Ferdinand IV of Naples
- Mother: Maria Carolina of Austria

Prince Gennaro of Naples and Sicily (Gennaro Carlo Francesco; 12 April 1780 – 1 January 1789) was a Prince of Naples and Sicily. He died of smallpox at age 8. He and his mother are the central figures of a portrait by Angelica Kauffman in 1783.

== Biography ==
Born at the Royal Palace of Naples in the Kingdom of Naples, he was his parents' third son and eighth child. He was named Gennaro in honour of Saint Januarius, the patron saint of Naples and a martyr saint of both the Roman Catholic and the Eastern Orthodox Churches.

A member of the Bourbons of Naples, he was a Prince of Naples and Sicily by birth.

His sisters included the future Holy Roman Empress, Grand Duchess of Tuscany. His younger sister's Princess Maria Cristina, was the wife of the future Charles Felix of Sardinia and Queen of Sardinia; Maria Cristina's twin Princess Maria Cristina Amelia died in 1783 of smallpox. Another sister was the Queen of the French and the youngest was the future Princess of Asturias.

His cousins included a Duke of Parma, Grand Duke of Tuscany, Holy Roman Emperor, Queen of Portugal, King of Spain, a Duchess of Calabria, the first wife of his older brother Ferdinand.

He was the second in line to the throne, second only to his oldest surviving brother Prince Francis, then Duke of Calabria. At the age of three, he survived a smallpox epidemic, which killed his older sister Maria Cristina Amelia and younger brother Giuseppe, the two dying within a week of each other in February 1783. Later that year, his mother gave birth to a stillborn daughter named Maria Cristina in honour of the deceased Maria Cristina Amelia.

In August 1788, his mother gave birth to another son named Carlo. In December 1788, Gennaro caught smallpox and died on 2 January 1789 at the Caserta Palace. Gennaro passed the illness onto his infant brother, who died a month after him. Both are buried at the Basilica of Santa Chiara, Naples.

== Ancestry ==
Ancestors of Prince Gennaro of Naples and Sicily

8. Philip V of Spain
4. Charles III of Spain
9. Elisabeth Farnese
2. Ferdinand I of the Two Sicilies
10. Augustus III of Poland
5. Maria Amalia of Saxony
11. Maria Josepha of Austria
1. Prince Gennaro of Naples and Sicily
12. Leopold, Duke of Lorraine
6. Francis I, Holy Roman Emperor
13. Élisabeth Charlotte of Orléans
3. Maria Carolina of Austria
14. Charles VI, Holy Roman Emperor
7. Maria Theresa of Austria
15. Elisabeth Christine of Brunswick
