= Ferdinand I of the Two Sicilies =

King of Naples and Sicily (r. 1759–1799; 1799–1806; 1815–1825)

Ferdinand I
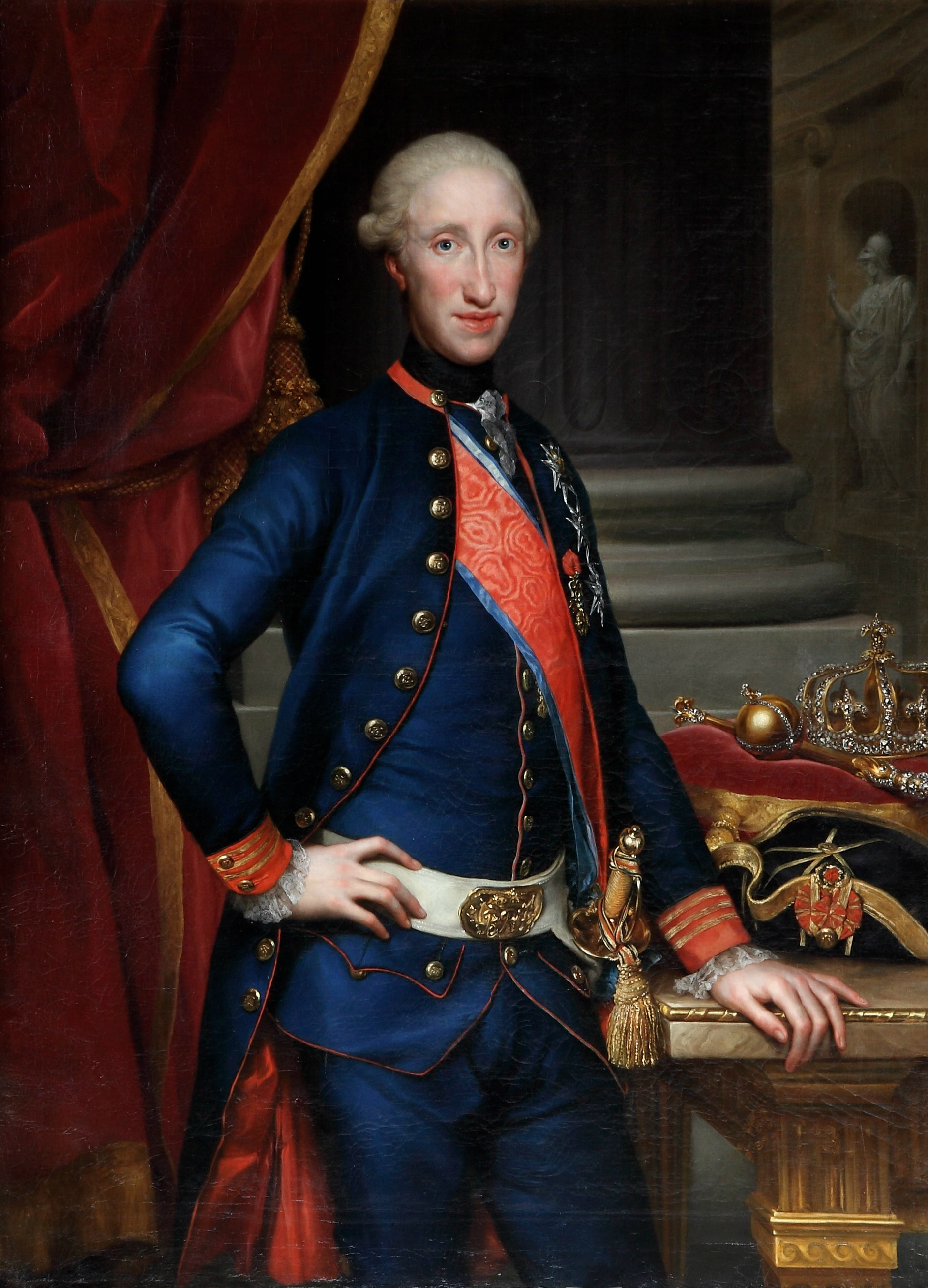
- Portrait by Anton Raphael Mengs, c. 1772–1773

King of the Two Sicilies
- Reign: 12 December 1816 – 4 January 1825
- Successor: Francis I

King of Naples
- Reign: 22 May 1815 – 8 December 1816
- Predecessor: Joachim I
- Reign: 13 June 1799 – 30 March 1806
- Predecessor: Étienne Macdonald (as dictator)
- Successor: Joseph I
- Reign: 6 October 1759 – 23 January 1799
- Predecessor: Charles VII
- Successor: Jean-Étienne Championnet (as dictator)

King of Sicily
- Reign: 6 October 1759 – 12 December 1816
- Predecessor: Charles III
- Born: 12 January 1751; Royal Palace, Naples
- Died: 4 January 1825 (aged 73); Naples, Two Sicilies
- Burial: Basilica of Santa Chiara, Naples
- Spouses: Maria Carolina of Austria (m. 1768; died 1814) Lucia Migliaccio (m. 1814)
- Issue Detail: See: Maria Teresa, Holy Roman Empress; Luisa, Grand Duchess of Tuscany; Francis I, King of the Two Sicilies; Maria Cristina, Queen of Sardinia; Maria Amalia, Queen of the French; Maria Antonia, Princess of Asturias; Leopoldo, Prince of Salerno
Names
- Ferdinando Antonio Pasquale Giovanni Nepomuceno Serafino Gennaro Benedetto di Borbone
- House: Bourbon-Two Sicilies
- Father: Charles III of Spain
- Mother: Maria Amalia of Saxony
- Religion: Catholic Church

Ferdinand I (Italian: Ferdinando I; 12 January 1751 – 4 January 1825) was King of the Two Sicilies from 1816 until his death. Before that he had been, since 1759, King of Naples as Ferdinand IV and King of Sicily as Ferdinand III. He was deposed twice from the throne of Naples: once by the revolutionary Parthenopean Republic for six months in 1799, and again by a French invasion in 1806, before being restored in 1815 at the end of the Napoleonic Wars.

Ferdinand was born in Naples as the third son of King Charles VII and Queen Maria Amalia. In August 1759, Charles succeeded his half-brother Ferdinand VI of Spain as King Charles III, but treaty provisions made him ineligible to hold all three crowns. On 6 October, he abdicated his Neapolitan and Sicilian titles in favour of his third son, Ferdinand, because his eldest son Philip had been excluded from succession due to intellectual disability and his second son Charles was heir-apparent to the Spanish throne. Ferdinand was the founder of the cadet House of Bourbon-Two Sicilies.

== Childhood ==
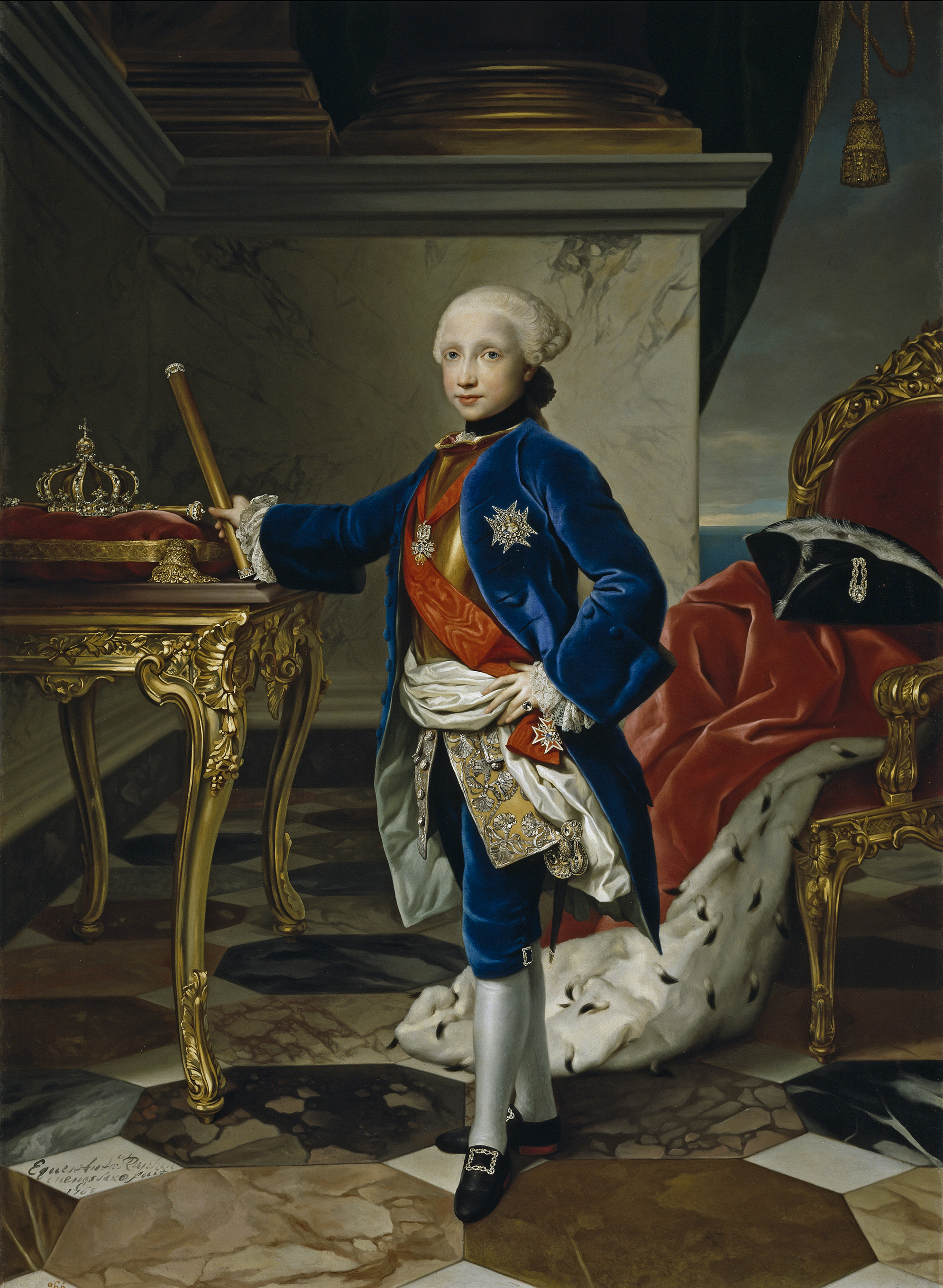
Ferdinand in 1760, at age nine

Ferdinand was born in Naples and grew up amidst many of the monuments erected there by his father which can be seen today; the Palaces of Portici, Caserta and Capodimonte.

Ferdinand was his parents' third son; his elder brother Charles was expected to inherit Naples and Sicily. When his father ascended the Spanish throne in 1759, he abdicated the thrones of Naples and Sicily in Ferdinand's favour in accordance with the treaties forbidding the union of the two crowns. A regency council presided over by the Tuscan Bernardo Tanucci was set up. Tanucci, an able, ambitious man, wishing to keep the government as much as possible in his own hands, purposely neglected the young king's education, and encouraged him in his love of pleasure, his idleness and his excessive devotion to outdoor sports.

== Reign ==
Ferdinand's minority ended in 1767, and his first act was the expulsion of the Jesuits. The following year he married Archduchess Maria Carolina, daughter of Empress Maria Theresa. By the marriage contract, the queen was to have a voice in the council of state after the birth of her first son, and she was not slow to avail herself of this means of political influence.

Tanucci, who attempted to thwart her, was dismissed in 1777. The Englishman Sir John Acton, who in 1779 was appointed director of marine, won Maria Carolina's favour by supporting her scheme to free Naples from Spanish influence, securing rapprochement with the Archduchy of Austria and the Kingdom of Great Britain. He became practically and afterward actually prime minister. Although not a mere grasping adventurer, he was largely responsible for reducing the internal administration of the country to a system of espionage, corruption and cruelty.

== French occupation and the Parthenopaean Republic ==
Although peace was made with France in 1796, the demands of the French Directory, whose troops occupied Rome, alarmed Ferdinand once more. At his wife's instigation, he took advantage of Napoleon's absence in the French campaign in Egypt and Syria and of Horatio Nelson's victories to go to war. Ferdinand marched with his army against the French and entered Rome (29 November). On the defeat of some of his columns, Ferdinand hurried back to Naples. On the approach of the French, Ferdinand fled on 23 December 1798 aboard Nelson's ship HMS Vanguard to Palermo, leaving his capital in a state of anarchy. The weather was extremely stormy and the king's 6-year-old younger son Prince Alberto died of exhaustion during the voyage, in the arms of Emma, Lady Hamilton, Nelson's mistress.

The French entered the city despite the fierce resistance of the lazzaroni, and with the aid of the nobles and bourgeoisie, established the Parthenopean Republic in January 1799. A few weeks later, when the French troops were recalled to northern Italy, Ferdinand sent a hastily assembled force under Fabrizio Cardinal Ruffo to reconquer the mainland kingdom. Ruffo, with the support of British artillery, the Church, and the pro-Bourbon aristocracy, succeeded in reaching Naples in May 1799, and the Parthenopean Republic collapsed. After some months, King Ferdinand returned to the throne.

The king and the queen were anxious that no mercy should be shown to the rebels, and Maria Carolina (a sister of the executed Marie Antoinette) made use of Lady Hamilton to induce Nelson to carry out her vengeance.

== Third Coalition ==
The king returned to Naples soon afterwards, and ordered the execution of several hundred French collaborators. This stopped only when the French successes forced him to agree to a treaty which included amnesty for members of the French party. When the War of the Third Coalition broke out between France and the Austrian Empire in 1805, Ferdinand signed a treaty of neutrality with the former. A few days later, Ferdinand allied himself with Austria and allowed an Anglo-Russian force to land at Naples.

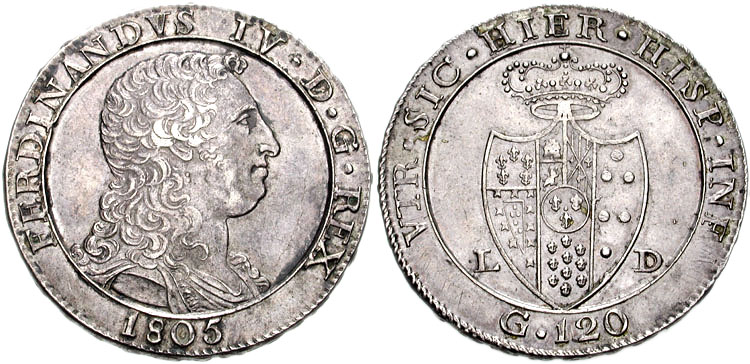
Piastra of Ferdinand IV of Naples, dated 1805

The French victory at the Battle of Austerlitz on 2 December enabled Napoleon to launch an invasion of the Kingdom of Naples. Ferdinand fled to Palermo on 23 January 1806, followed soon after by his wife and son, and on 14 February 1806 the French again entered Naples. Napoleon declared that the Bourbon dynasty had forfeited the crown, and proclaimed his brother Joseph King of Naples and Sicily. But Ferdinand continued to reign over the latter kingdom (becoming the first King of Sicily in centuries to actually reside there) under British protection.

Parliamentary institutions of a feudal type had long existed on the island, and Lord William Bentinck, the British minister, insisted on a reform of the constitution on English and French lines. The king indeed practically abdicated his power, appointing his son Francis as regent, and the queen, at Bentinck's insistence, was exiled to Austria, where she died in 1814.

== Restoration ==
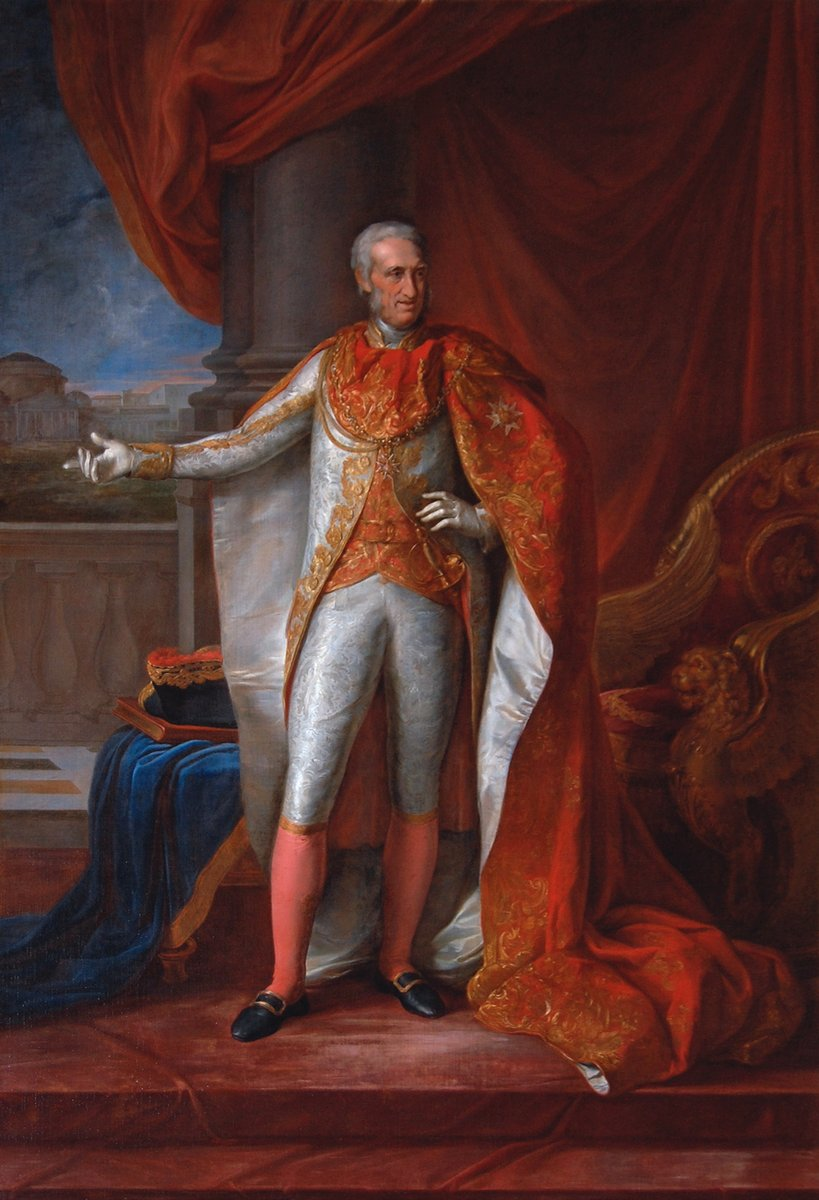
Portrait of Ferdinand I of the Two Sicilies by Vincenzo Camuccini, 1818-1819

After the fall of Napoleon, Joachim Murat, who had succeeded Joseph Bonaparte as king of Naples in 1808, was dethroned in the Neapolitan War in 1815, and Ferdinand returned to Naples. By a secret treaty he had bound himself not to advance further in a constitutional direction than Austria should at any time approve; but, though on the whole he acted in accordance with Metternich's policy of preserving the status quo, and maintained with but slight change Murat's laws and administrative system. Ferdinand took advantage of the situation to abolish the Sicilian constitution, in violation of his oath, and to proclaim the union of the two states into the Kingdom of the Two Sicilies (12 December 1816).

Ferdinand was now completely subservient to Austria; an Austrian, Count Nugent, being even made commander-in-chief of the army. For the next four years, Ferdinand reigned as an absolute monarch within his domain, granting no constitutional reforms.

== 1820 revolution ==
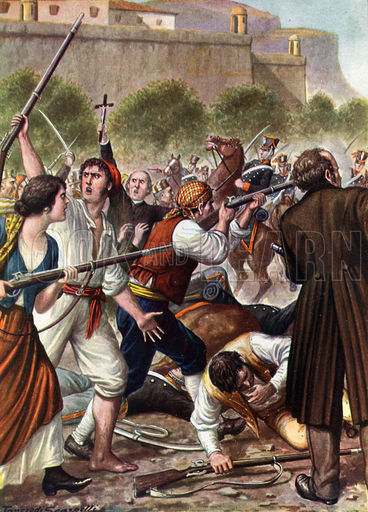
Palermo insurrection of 1820

The suppression of liberal opinion caused an alarming spread of the influence and activity of the secret society of the Carbonari, which in time affected a large part of the army. In July 1820, a military revolt broke out under General Guglielmo Pepe, and Ferdinand was terrorised into signing a constitution on the model of the Spanish Constitution of 1812. On the other hand, a revolt in Sicily, in favour of the recovery of its independence, was suppressed by Neapolitan troops.

The success of the military revolution at Naples seriously alarmed the powers of the Holy Alliance, who feared that it might spread to other Italian states and so lead to a general European conflagration. The Troppau Protocol of 1820 was signed by Austria, Prussia and Russia, although an invitation to Ferdinand to attend the adjourned Congress of Laibach (1821) was issued at which he failed to distinguish himself. He had twice sworn to maintain the new constitution but was hardly out of Naples before he repudiated his oaths and, in letters addressed to all the sovereigns of Europe, declared his acts to have been null and void. Metternich had no difficulty in persuading the king to allow an Austrian army to march into Naples "to restore order".

The Neapolitans, commanded by General Pepe, made no attempt to defend the difficult defiles of the Abruzzi, and were defeated at Battle of Rieti (7 March 1821). The Austrians entered Naples.

== Later years ==
Following the Austrian victory, the Parliament was dismissed and Ferdinand suppressed the Liberals and Carbonari. The victory was used by Austria to force its grasp over Naples' domestic and foreign policies. Count Charles-Louis de Ficquelmont was appointed as the Austrian ambassador to Naples, practically administering the country as well as managing the occupation and strengthening Austrian influence over Neapolitan elites.

Ferdinand died in Naples on 4 January 1825. He was the last surviving child of Charles III.

== Cultural depictions ==
- That Hamilton Woman (1941) directed by Alexander Korda, played by Luis Alberni
- Ferdinando and Carolina (1999) directed by Lina Wertmüller, played by Sergio Assisi, Adriano Pantaleo, and Mario Scaccia at different ages
- Luisa Sanfelice (2004) directed by Paolo and Vittorio Taviani, played by Emilio Solfrizzi
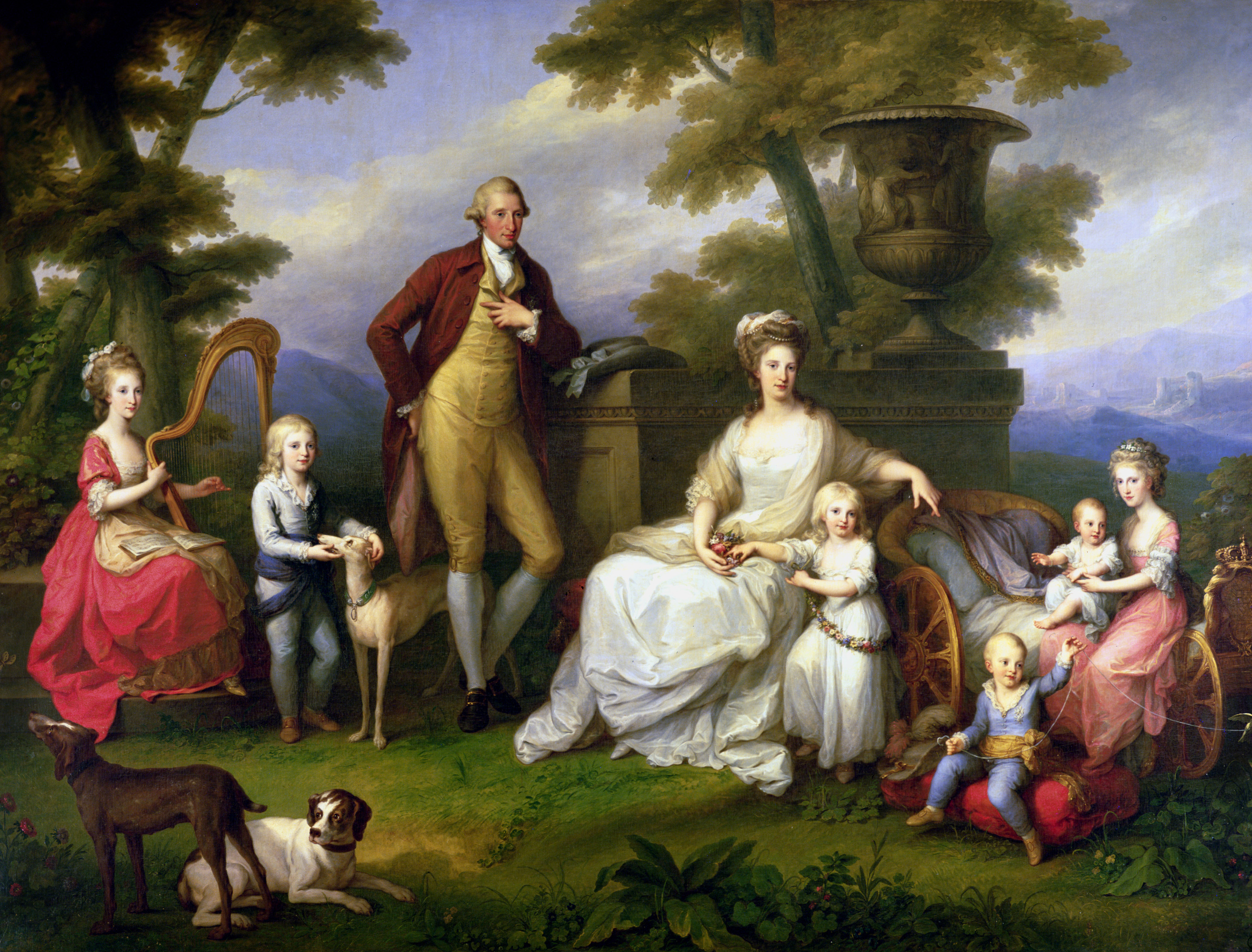
Family of Ferdinand I in 1783
The Royal Family of Naples and Sicily in 1783, Angelica Kauffman; (L-R) Princess Maria Teresa; the future King Prince Francis; King Ferdinand; Queen Maria Carolina holding Princess Maria Cristina; Prince Gennaro (died in 1789); Princess Maria Amalia in the arms of Princess Luisa; the royal couple's seventh child was stillborn during the preparation phase for the painting. The artist then painted a veil over the child already in the cradle, which had been clearly visible in the modello.

== Issue ==
Children of Ferdinand I
Name	Picture	Birth	Death	Notes
By Maria Carolina of Austria (Vienna, 13 August 1752 – Vienna, 8 September 1814)
Maria Teresa Carolina Giuseppina		Royal Palace of Naples, 6 June 1772	Hofburg Imperial Palace, 13 April 1807	Named after her maternal grandmother, Maria Theresa of Austria, she married her first cousin Francis II, Holy Roman Emperor in 1790; had issue.
Maria Luisa Amelia Teresa		Royal Palace of Naples, 27 July 1773	Hofburg Imperial Palace, 19 September 1802	Married her first cousin Ferdinand III, Grand Duke of Tuscany and had issue.
Carlo Tito Francesco Giuseppe		Caserta Palace, 6 January 1775	Caserta Palace, 17 December 1778	Died of smallpox.
Maria Anna Giuseppa Antonietta Francesca Gaetana Teresa		Royal Palace of Naples, 23 November 1775	Royal Palace of Naples, 22 February 1780	Died of smallpox.
Francesco Gennaro Giuseppe Saverio Giovanni Battista		Royal Palace of Naples, 19 August 1777	Naples, 8 November 1830	Married his cousin Archduchess Maria Clementina of Austria in 1797 and had issue; married another cousin Infanta Maria Isabella of Spain in 1802 and had issue; was King of the Two Sicilies from 1825 to 1830.
Maria Cristina Teresa		Caserta Palace, 17 January 1779	Savona, 11 March 1849	Married Charles Felix of Sardinia in 1807; had no issue; it was she who ordered the excavations of Tusculum.
Maria Cristina Amelia		Caserta Palace, 17 January 1779	Caserta Palace, 26 February 1783	Died of smallpox. Died in childhood.
Gennaro Carlo Francesco		Royal Palace of Naples, 12 April 1780	Caserta Palace, 1 January 1789	Died of smallpox.
Giuseppe Carlo Gennaro		Royal Palace of Naples, 18 June 1781	Caserta Palace, 19 February 1783	Died of smallpox.
Maria Amelia Teresa		Caserta Palace, 26 April 1782	Claremont House, 24 March 1866	Married in 1809 Louis Philippe I, Duke of Orleans, King of the French and had issue.
Maria Cristina		Caserta Palace, 19 July 1783	Caserta Palace, 19 July 1783	Stillborn.
Maria Antonietta Teresa Amelia Giovanna Battista Francesca Gaetana Maria Anna Lucia		Caserta Palace, 14 December 1784	Royal Palace of Aranjuez, 21 May 1806	Married her cousin Infante Ferdinand, Prince of Asturias; died from tuberculosis; had no issue.
Maria Clotilde Teresa Amelia Antonietta Giovanna Battista Anna Gaetana Polcheria		Caserta Palace, 18 February 1786	Naples, 10 September 1792	Died of smallpox.
Maria Enrichetta Carmela		Naples, 31 July 1787	Naples, 20 September 1792	Died of smallpox.
Carlo Gennaro		Naples, 26 August 1788	Caserta Palace, 1 February 1789	Died of smallpox. Died aged 5 months.
Leopoldo Giovanni Giuseppe Michele of Naples		Naples, 2 July 1790	Naples, 10 March 1851	Married his niece Archduchess Clementina of Austria and had issue.
Alberto Lodovico Maria Filipo Gaetano		Royal Palace of Naples, 2 May 1792	Died on board HMS Vanguard, 25 December 1798	Died in childhood (died of exhaustion on board HMS Vanguard).
Maria Isabella		Naples, 2 December 1793	Naples, 23 April 1801	Died in childhood.

== Ancestry ==
Ancestors of Ferdinand I of the Two Sicilies

Louis, Dauphin of France
Philip V of Spain
Maria Anna Victoria of Bavaria
Charles III of Spain
Odoardo Farnese, Hereditary Prince of Parma
Elisabeth Farnese
Dorothea Sophie of Neuburg
Ferdinand I of the Two Sicilies
Augustus II of Poland
Augustus III of Poland
Christiane Eberhardine of Brandenburg-Bayreuth
Maria Amalia of Saxony
Joseph I, Holy Roman Emperor
Maria Josepha of Austria
Wilhelmine Amalie of Brunswick-Lüneburg

== Heraldry ==
Heraldry of Ferdinand of Naples, Sicily and the Two Sicilies

Coat of arms as King of Naples
(1759–1799 / 1799–1806 /1814–1816)

Coat of arms as King of Sicily
(1759–1816)

Coat of arms as King of the Two Sicilies
(1816–1825)

Ferdinand I of the Two Sicilies House of Bourbon-Two Sicilies Cadet branch of the House of Bourbon Born: 12 January 1751 Died: 4 January 1825
Regnal titles
Preceded by Charles VII & III	King of Naples (as Ferdinand IV); 6 October 1759 – 23 January 1799	Parthenopaean Republic
Preceded by Charles VII & III	King of Sicily (as Ferdinand III); 6 October 1759 – 12 December 1816	Himself as King of the Two Sicilies
Preceded by Joachim Murat	King of Naples (as Ferdinand IV); 22 May 1815 – 12 December 1816	Himself as King of the Two Sicilies
Parthenopaean Republic	King of Naples (as Ferdinand IV); 13 June 1799 – 30 March 1806	Succeeded by Joseph Bonaparte
Union of the crowns	King of the Two Sicilies (as Ferdinand I); 12 December 1816 – 4 January 1825	Succeeded by Francis I
