= Carlo, Duke of Calabria =

Italian prince (1775-1778)

Carlo
- Duke of Calabria
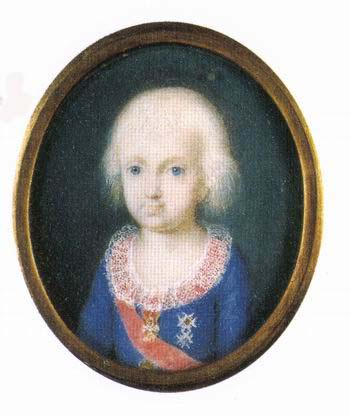
- Born: 4 January 1775; Caserta Palace, Kingdom of Naples
- Died: 17 December 1778 (aged 3); Caserta Palace, Kingdom of Naples
- Burial: Basilica of Santa Chiara
- Italian: Carlo Tito Francesco Giuseppe
- House: Bourbon-Two Sicilies
- Father: Ferdinand IV of Naples
- Mother: Maria Carolina of Austria

Prince Carlo of Naples and Sicily (Italian: Carlo Tito Francesco Giuseppe; 4 January 1775 – 17 December 1778) was Duke of Calabria as heir to the kingdoms of Naples and Sicily.

== Biography ==
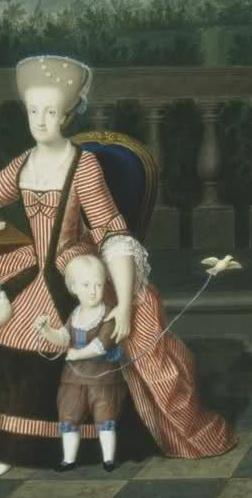
Prince Carlo with his mother Maria Carolina, circa 1775, painted by Carlo Marsigli.

Born at the Caserta Palace near Naples, he was the heir apparent to his father's throne at birth, as his uncle Infante Philip, Duke of Calabria was excluded from the Neapolitan and Sicilian succession due to his intellectual disability. His mother was a daughter of Empress Maria Theresa and thus sister of Marie Antoinette.

A member of the House of Bourbon, he was a prince of Naples and Sicily by birth. He was the hereditary prince of Naples. His birth allowed his mother to have a place in the Council of State, pursuant to his parents' marriage contract. With the death of his uncle Philip in 1777, Carlo was then known as the Duke of Calabria.

Carlo died of smallpox aged 3. Six of his younger siblings would die of smallpox also: Princess Maria Anna (in 1780), Prince Giuseppe (in 1783), Prince Gennaro (in 1789), Prince Carlo Gennaro (also in 1789), Princess Maria Clotilde (in 1792) and Princess Maria Henriette (also in 1792).

He was buried at the Church of Santa Chiara in Naples.
