= Princess Maria Antonia of Naples and Sicily =

First wife of Ferdinand VII (1784–1806)

Maria Antonia of Naples and Sicily
- Princess of Asturias
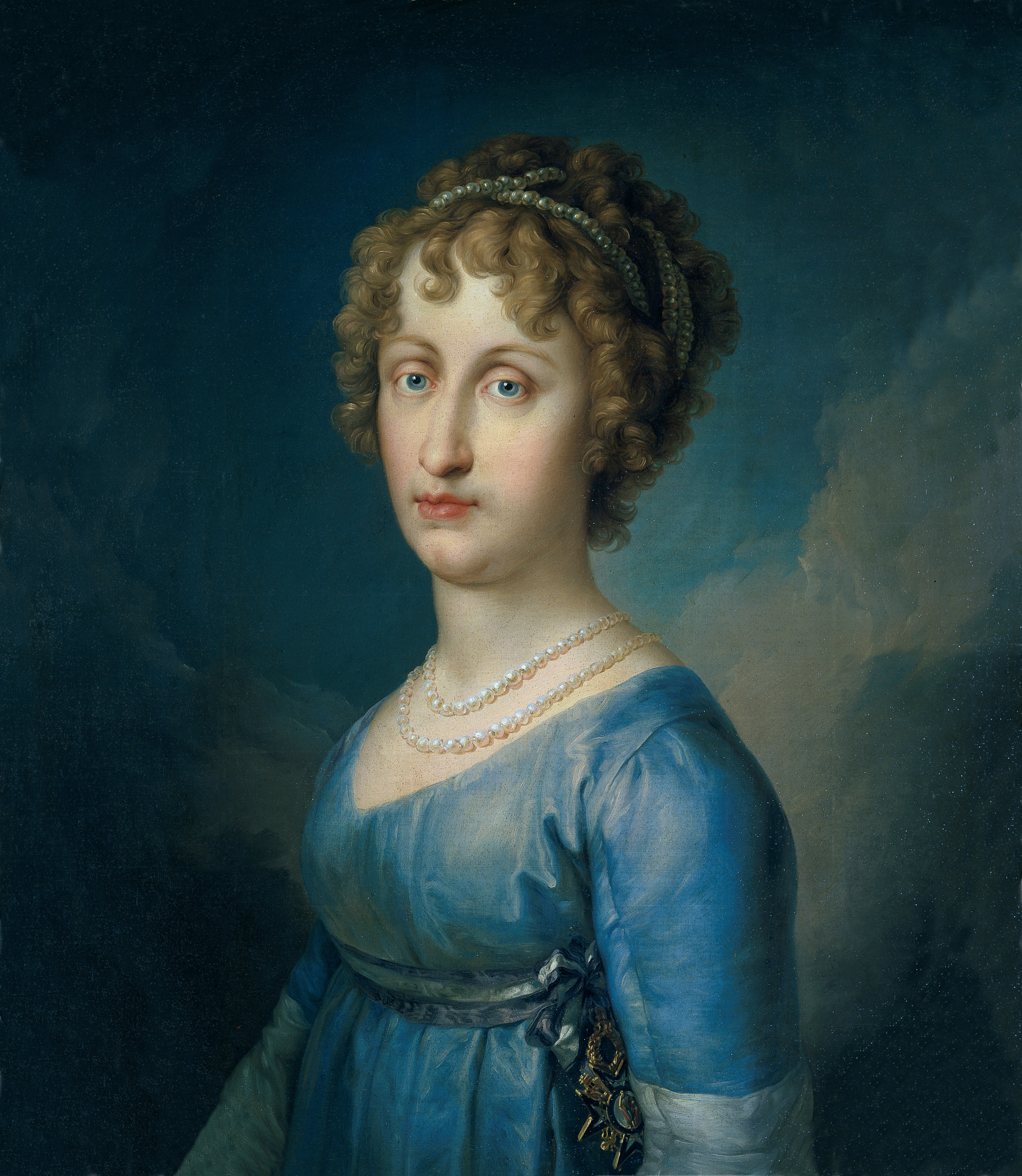
- Posthumous portrait by Vicente López Portaña, c. 1815
- Born: 14 December 1784; Caserta Palace, Caserta, Naples
- Died: 21 May 1806 (aged 21); Royal Palace of Aranjuez, Aranjuez, Kingdom of Spain
- Burial: El Escorial
- Spouse: Ferdinand, Prince of Asturias (later Ferdinand VII) (m. 1802)
Names
- Italian: Maria Antonietta Teresa Amelia Giovanna Battista Francesca Gaetana Maria Anna Lucia
- House: Bourbon-Two Sicilies
- Father: Ferdinand IV of Naples and III of Sicily
- Mother: Maria Carolina of Austria

Maria Antonia of Naples and Sicily (14 December 1784 – 21 May 1806) was the youngest surviving daughter of Ferdinand, King of Naples and Sicily, and Maria Carolina of Austria. As the wife of the future Ferdinand VII of Spain, then heir apparent to the Spanish throne, she held the title of Princess of Asturias. It was rumoured that her mother-in-law, Maria Luisa of Parma, caused her death, but there is no evidence to prove this.

== Early life ==
Born at the Caserta Palace in Caserta, Italy, Maria Antonia was the youngest daughter of King Ferdinand IV/III of Naples and Sicily and his first wife, Maria Carolina of Austria. Named after her mother's favourite sister, her maternal aunt Queen Marie Antoinette of France, she was an intelligent girl, having learned several languages by the age of seventeen.

=== Marriage ===
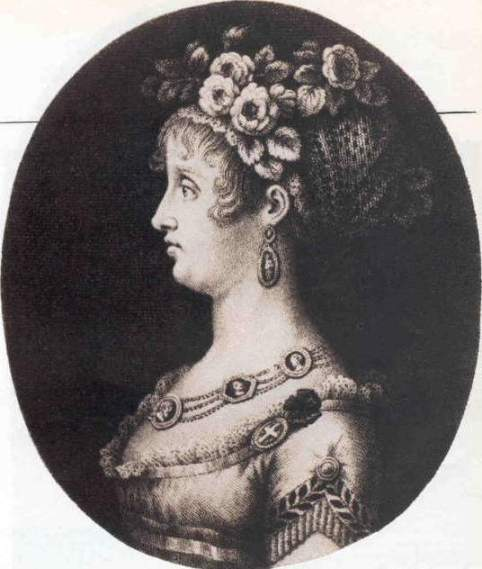
Princess Maria Antonietta

In a series of dynastic alliances, a double marriage took place. Maria Antonia became engaged to her first cousin, Infante Ferdinand, Prince of Asturias (who later became King Ferdinand VII of Spain), while her eldest brother, Francis, became engaged to Infante Ferdinand's younger sister, Infanta Maria Isabella of Spain. On 4 October 1802, 13-year-old Maria Isabella married Francis, who was 25 years old, and two days later, on 6 October, Maria Antonia married Infante Ferdinand in Barcelona, Spain. Both of them were seventeen, with Ferdinand only being two months older than Maria Antonia, and the marriage took place the week before his eighteenth birthday. Their fathers were brothers.

== Princess of Asturias ==
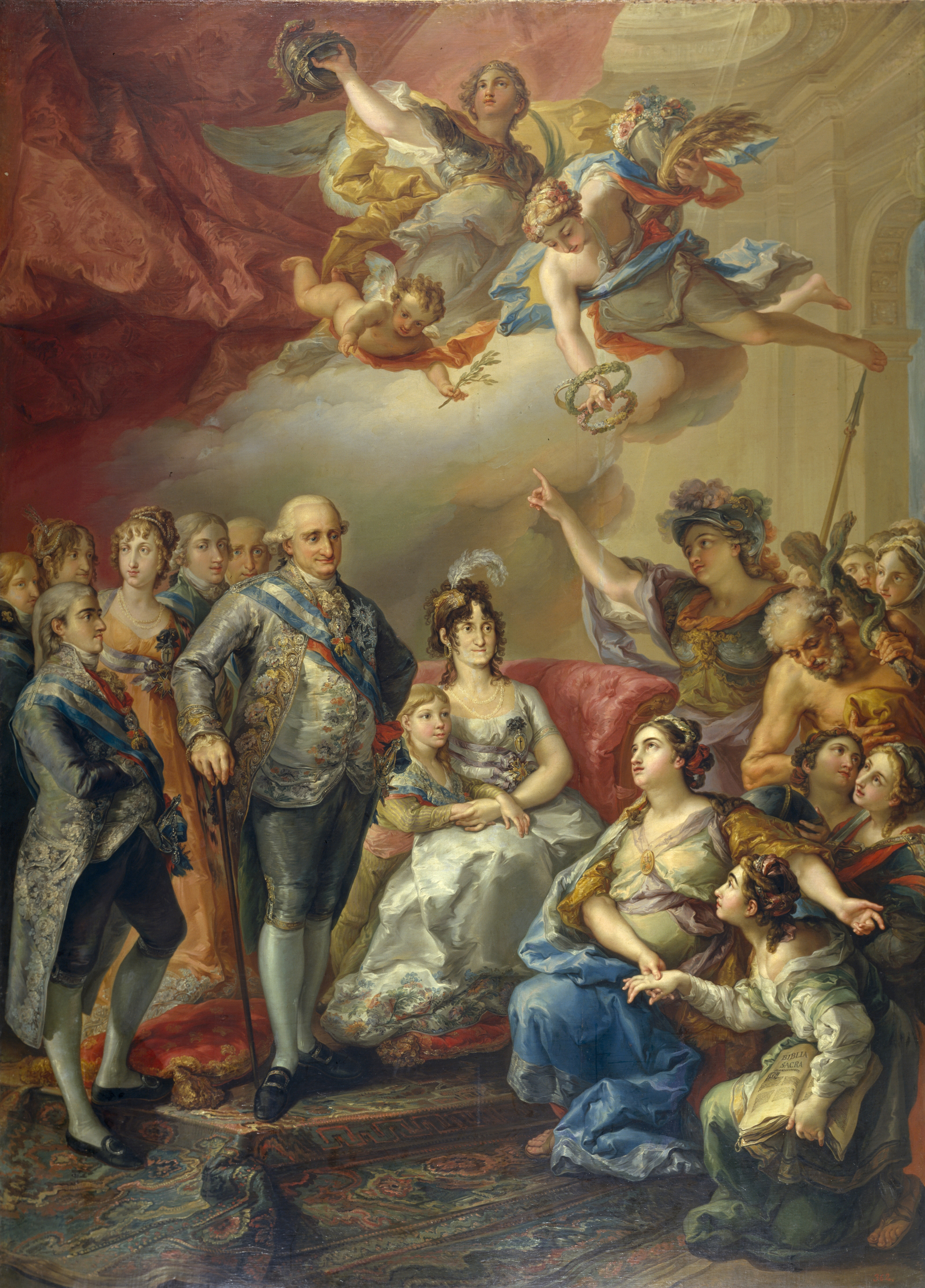
Maria Antonia (fourth from left), together with the rest of the Spanish royal family, visits the University of Valencia in 1802, shortly after her wedding. Oil painting by Vicente López.

The princess failed to provide the expected heir to the throne: her two pregnancies, in 1804 and 1805, ended in miscarriages. Her mother, Maria Carolina, was highly anti-French after the execution of her sister and brother-in-law during the French Revolution. She was also strongly opposed to the military expansion of the French Republic. As Spain became more easily dominated by Napoleon Bonaparte, there were rumours that Maria Carolina wanted her daughter to poison the Queen of Spain and Manuel Godoy, Spain's prime minister. However, as with most poison rumours of the period, it is unlikely to be true, not least because both women were devout Roman Catholics and secondly because the Spanish court's ties to France were in no way greater or lesser than most in Europe after Napoleon’s early victories. Maria Antonia's mother-in-law, Queen Maria Luisa, disliked her daughter-in-law and she encouraged rumours of a Habsburg poisoning plot, even subjecting her books and clothes to scrutiny in order to discredit her daughter-in-law further. In spite of all of this campaign of character assassination, Maria Antonia managed to gain considerable influence over her husband and created an opposition party against Queen Maria Luisa and Godoy.

== Death ==
Maria Antonia died of tuberculosis on 21 May 1806 at the Royal Palace of Aranjuez in Aranjuez, Spain, at the age of 21. It was rumoured that Maria Antonia had been poisoned by Queen Maria Luisa and Manuel Godoy but there is no evidence to support this claim. However, Queen Maria Carolina, who was devastated, truly believed this. Maria Antonia's father, King Ferdinand, consolidated Naples and Sicily into the Kingdom of the Two Sicilies a decade after her death.

The Neapolitan princess was buried at El Escorial in Spain. Her husband was to marry three more times: –

- Infanta Maria Isabel of Portugal in Madrid on 29 September 1816; the couple had a daughter who died young.
- Maria Josepha Amalia of Saxony on 20 October 1819, who bore him no children.
- Maria Antonia's niece (born a month before her death), Princess Maria Christina of Naples and Sicily (more often known as of the Two Sicilies), with whom Ferdinand had the future Isabella II of Spain.

== Ancestry ==
Ancestors of Princess Maria Antonia of Naples and Sicily

8. Philip V of Spain
4. Charles III of Spain
9. Elisabeth Farnese
2. Ferdinand I of the Two Sicilies
10. Augustus III of Poland
5. Maria Amalia of Saxony
11. Maria Josepha of Austria
1. Princess Maria Antonia of Naples and Sicily
12. Leopold, Duke of Lorraine
6. Francis I, Holy Roman Emperor
13. Élisabeth Charlotte of Orléans
3. Maria Carolina of Austria
14. Charles VI, Holy Roman Emperor
7. Maria Theresa of Austria
15. Elisabeth Christine of Brunswick

== Bibliography ==
- EPTON, Nina, The Spanish mousetrap: Napoleon and the Court of Spain (London: Macdonald, 1973).
- HILT, Douglas, The troubled trinity: Godoy and the Spanish monarchs (Tuscaloosa; London: University of Alabama Press, 1987).
