= François d'Orléans (1854–1872) =

French royal; grandson of Louis Philippe I

- Duke of Guise
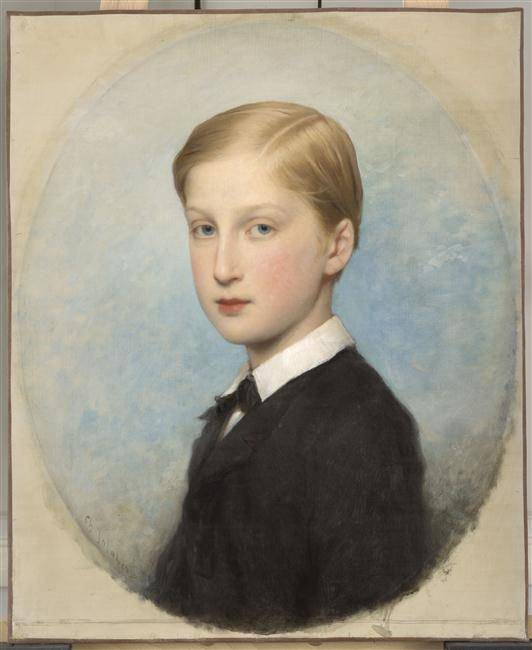
- Portrait c. 1865
- Born: 5 January 1854; Orleans House, Twickenham, England
- Died: 25 July 1872 (aged 18); Rue du Faubourg Saint-Honoré, Paris, France
- Burial: 27 July 1872; Chapelle royale de Dreux
Names
- François Louis Marie Philippe d'Orléans
- House: Orléans
- Father: Henri d'Orléans, Duke of Aumale
- Mother: Princess Maria Carolina Augusta of Bourbon-Two Sicilies

François Louis Marie Philippe d'Orléans (5 January 1854 – 25 July 1872) was a member of the House of Orléans who used the courtesy title of Duke of Guise. He was the last surviving child of Henri d'Orléans, Duke of Aumale and Princess Maria Carolina Augusta of Bourbon-Two Sicilies.

== Family ==
François Louis Marie Philippe d'Orléans was the fourth son of Henri d'Orléans, Duke of Aumale and of his wife Princess Maria Carolina Augusta of Bourbon-Two Sicilies.

Through his father, he was the grandson of Louis Philippe I, King of the French and Maria Amalia of Naples and Sicily while through his mother he was a grandson of Leopold, Prince of Salerno and Archduchess Clementina of Austria, daughter of Francis II, Holy Roman Emperor and Maria Theresa of Naples and Sicily.

== Exile in England ==
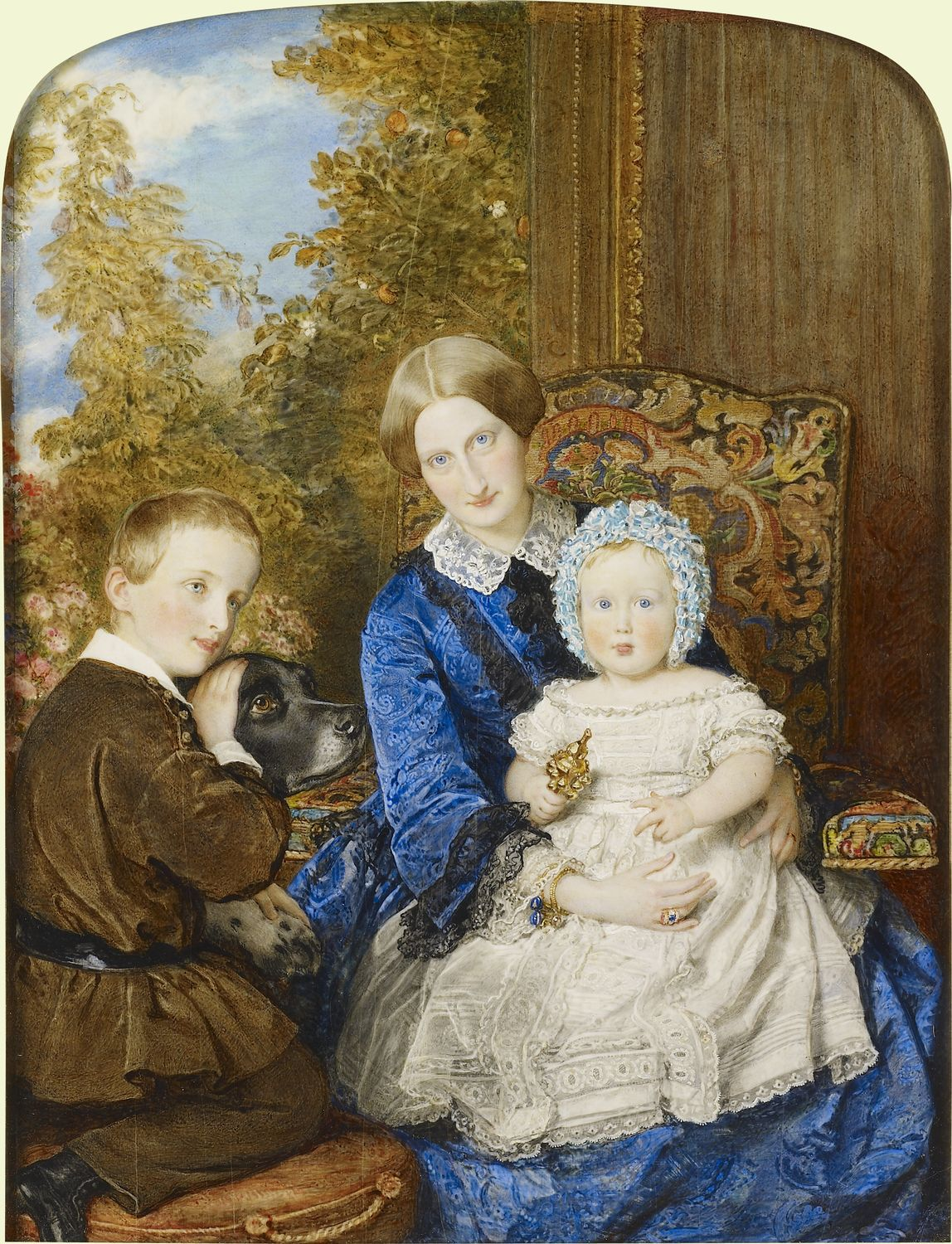
François, with his mother Maria Carolina and his brother Louis, by William Charles Ross c. 1855.

François was born on 5 January 1854 at Orleans House in Twickenham, London. His parents had been in England in exile since 24 February 1848 because of the February 1848 Revolution where they settled in Orleans House upon the death of Louis Philippe I in 1850.

François received the title of Duke of Guise from birth. He had the same name and title as his brother, who died at three months old in April 1852.

François was baptised at the chapel of Saint-Raphael in Kingston Upon Thames and his godparents were his uncle and aunt Prince Louis, Duke of Nemours and Princess Victoria of Saxe-Coburg and Gotha.

After the outbreak of the revolution, the formal royal family had gone into exile in England to Queen Victoria where the family later bought Orleans House. He had only one surviving brother, Louis d'Orléans, Prince of Condé, who died in Australia on 24 May 1866. Three years later, his mother, Maria Carolina, died of a pulmonary embolism at the age of 47 in Twickenham. A year before her death, she said about the future of François "my poor Guise, so intelligent and so good, should not be brought up in mourning and sadness. This whole generation around us is counting on me."

== Return to France ==
In September 1870, his father learned of the French loss at the Battle of Sedan and so along with his brother, François d'Orléans, Prince of Joinville offered to fight but they were later escorted back by ship. In February 1871, his father was elected Member of the Chamber of Deputies for Oise and that July the laws of exile of Napoleon III were repealed.

In July 1871, he joined his father and returned to France. Although his health had been fragile for a long period of time, he intended to devote himself to hunting, something that he had requested a permit for from the French authorities. In his religious life, he maintained a close friendship with Abbé Nicolas Auguste Guelle (1799-1881), who had followed the family to the United Kingdom and returned with him to France. He was educated at Lycée Condorcet and prepared for a baccalaureate in science at Sorbonne.

== Illness and death ==
In July 1872, François became ill with scarlet fever and on 21 July his condition worsened suddenly. The attempts of the family doctor, Henri Guéneau de Mussy, to help were unsuccessful. His condition worsened so rapidly that only part of his family were able to be at his bedside. Prince Philippe, Count of Paris arrived to see him and he received the help of the religion from Abbé Guelle. On 25 July 1872, François died at the age of 18 at his fathers' private mansion No. 129 Rue du Faubourg Saint-Honoré in the 8th arrondissement of Paris.

== Funeral and legacy ==
On 27 July 1872, the remains of François were brought to Dreux station in the presence of his family, members of the Chamber of Deputies and generals. His coffin was carried on a white funeral chariot with stars which was harnessed by four white horses and held by footmen. The mourning was led by his father followed by his cousin Prince Philippe, Count of Paris and the Duke of Nemours, the Prince of Joinville, the Duke of Penthièvre and the Duke of Montpensier. François was buried at the Chapelle royale de Dreux after a religious service. Two other ceremonies were held on the same day, at the Notre-Dame-de-la-Compassion and the Église Saint-Philippe-du-Roule. His first cousin, King Leopold II, announced fifteen days of mourning at the Royal court of Belgium from 27 July to 10 August.

François was the last surviving child of his parents and his father had outlived all of his children. The media speculated that he would retire from politics and the military because of his mourning for François, which he did not.

== Ancestry ==
Ancestors of François d'Orléans (1854–1872)

8. Louis Philippe II, Duke of Orléans
4. Louis Philippe I of France
9. Louise Marie Adélaïde de Bourbon
2. Henri, Duke of Aumale
10. Ferdinand I of the Two Sicilies
5. Marie Amélie of Naples and Sicily
11. Maria Carolina of Austria
1. Louis, Prince of Condé
12. Ferdinand I of the Two Sicilies (= 10)
6. Leopold, Prince of Salerno
13. Maria Carolina of Austria (= 11)
3. Maria Carolina of the Two Sicilies
14. Francis II, Holy Roman Emperor
7. Maria Clementina of Austria
15. Maria Theresa of Naples and Sicily
