= Louis d'Orléans, Prince of Condé =

French prince; grandson of Louis Philippe I

Louis d'Orléans
- Prince of Condé
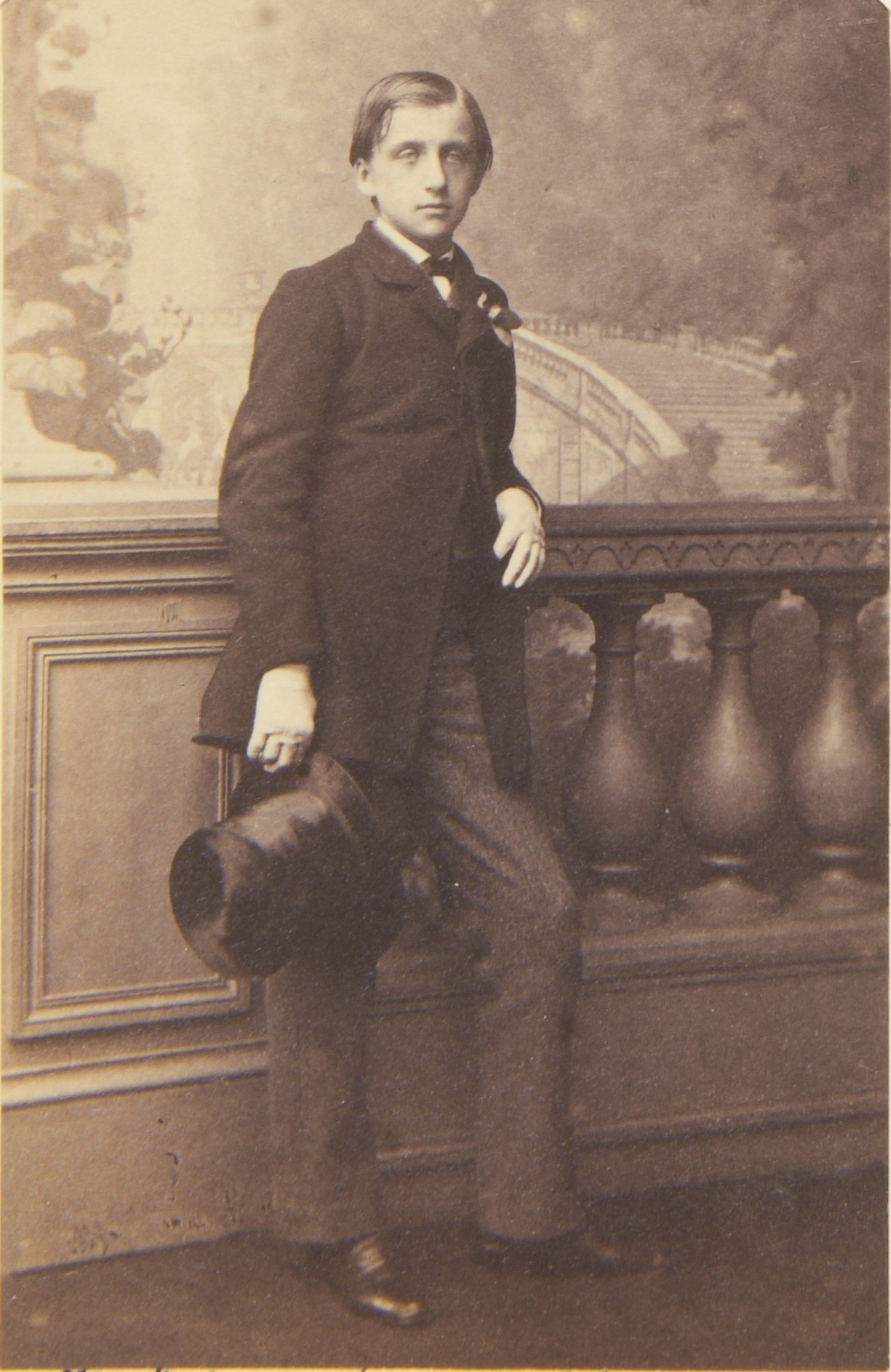
- Louis d'Orléans c. 1861
- Born: 15 November 1845; Saint-Cloud, France
- Died: 24 May 1866 (aged 20); Sydney, Australia
- Burial: Chapelle royale de Dreux
Names
- Louis Philippe Marie Léopold d’Orléans
- House: Orléans
- Father: Henri d'Orleans, Duke of Aumale
- Mother: Princess Maria Carolina Augusta of Bourbon-Two Sicilies
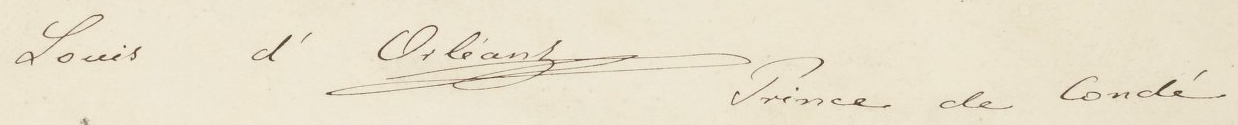
- Signature

Louis Philippe Marie Léopold d'Orléans (15 November 1845 – 24 May 1866) was a member of the House of Orléans and held the title of Prince of Condé. He was the first member of a royal house to visit the Australian continent where he died in 1866.

== Life ==
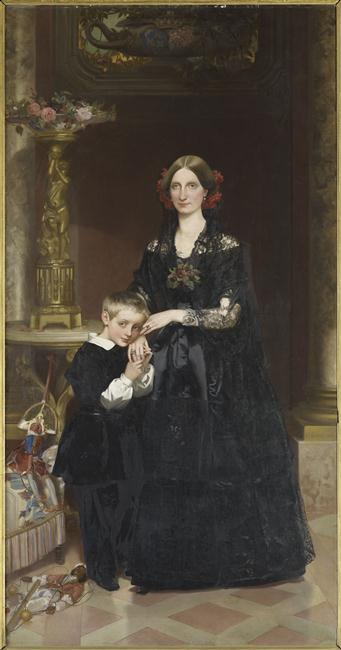
Louis d'Orléans with his mother, Maria Carolina of Bourbon-Two Sicilies (Victor Mottez, 1851)

=== Exile in England ===
Louis d'Orléans was born on 15 November 1845 in Saint-Cloud, the eldest son of Henri d'Orléans, Duke of Aumale and his wife, Princess Maria Carolina of Bourbon-Two Sicilies. He was given the title Prince of Condé, originally borne by the House of Bourbon-Condé; however, on the death of Louis Henri, Prince of Condé, it died out. With reference to the most renowned bearer of the title, le Grand Condé, the young Louis d'Orléans was given the nickname "le petit Condé".

Following the outbreak of the French Revolution of 1848, he and his family went into exile in England. Later he attended the Royal High School in Edinburgh, where he was taught by Leonhard Schmitz.

=== Journey to Australia ===
When Louis d'Orléans was 20 years old, his father arranged an 18-month world tour for him. In the view of his father, a journey through climes beyond the borders of Europe would improve his ailing health. Together with his doctor, Paul Gingeot, and his cousin, Prince Ferdinand, Duke of Alençon, Louis d'Orléans began his journey on 4 February 1866 in Southampton on the Mongolia, a passenger ship owned by British shipping line, P&O. The itinerary was to take him to Egypt, Ceylon, Australia, New Zealand, Java, China, Japan and India. Louis d'Orléans was especially interested in Australia; he was fascinated by its exotic nature.

Because the Suez Canal was still not completed in 1866, after his arrival in Alexandria he travelled by train via Cairo to Suez and then took a smaller ship to join up eventually with the Bengal, another P&O passenger ship, on which Louis d'Orléans and Gingeot continued their journey. Ferdinand d'Orléans, Duke of Alençon, had left the group in Egypt in order to go on to Manila. After a short stay in Ceylon, they continued their travels on the P&O liner, Bombay.

On 8 April, the Bombay reached King George Sound, a bay on the southwest coast of Western Australia. Louis d'Orléans went ashore at Albany, accompanied by a wealthy businessman from Queensland, and met there, amongst others, the Chief Magistrate of Albany, Sir Alexander Campbell.

On 13 April, the Bombay entered the port at Melbourne. Louis d'Orléans, who wanted to get to Sydney as soon as possible, decided to visit the city on his return journey. The Bombay continued along past the colonies of South Australia, Victoria and New South Wales, past Cape Howe and the Australian Alps.

On 16 April 1866, the Bombay tied up at Port Jackson. D'Orléans was very impressed by the town and compared it to old towns around the world.

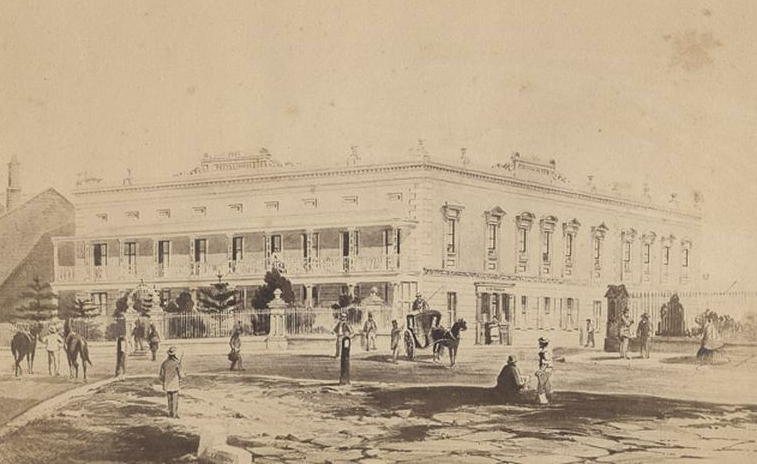
Petty's Hotel, the last residence of the Prince of Condé

Although several people, including the Governor of New South Wales, Sir John Young, offered d'Orléans and his travelling companions better accommodation, he decided to stay at Petty's Hotel on Church Hill near St. Philip's. Over the next five weeks, d'Orléans, whose health had markedly improved, went to various social occasions, visited the University of Sydney, the Australian Museum, the Royal Botanic Garden and Sydney Hospital, during the course of which he met local dignitaries like Edward Deas Thomson, the Chancellor of the University of Sydney, and Charles Moore, the Director of the Botanic Gardens. Other excursions took him to Parramatta, Windsor and Kurrajong.

=== Death and burial ===
On 12 May 1866, he received news of the death of his grandmother, Maria Amalia of Naples and Sicily, which affected him badly and this, together with a cold, that he had picked up during his trip to Manly, caused his health to noticeably worsen. Dr Gingeot ordered him to rest, but the Prince ignored him.

After a short-lived improvement, his health deteriorated rapidly, so that Dr. Gingeot sought the opinion of a second doctor. On the evening of 24 May, at the early age of 20, Louis d'Orléans died in Sydney in the presence of Dr. Gingeot, his valet and archdeacon McEnroe, who administered the last rites. On his death, the title of Prince of Condé died out for a second, and final, time.

Over the next few days, various public figures visited Petty's Hotel, including Governor John Young, Chief Justice Alfred Stephen, the Premier of New South Wales James Martin, Commodore Sir William Wiseman and the Consuls of the United States, the Netherlands, Belgium and Brazil, in order to pay their last respects to d'Orléans. Louis Sentis, the French consul, unlike his peers, went as a private individual, because the French government did not recognise the claims of the House of Orléans to the French throne.

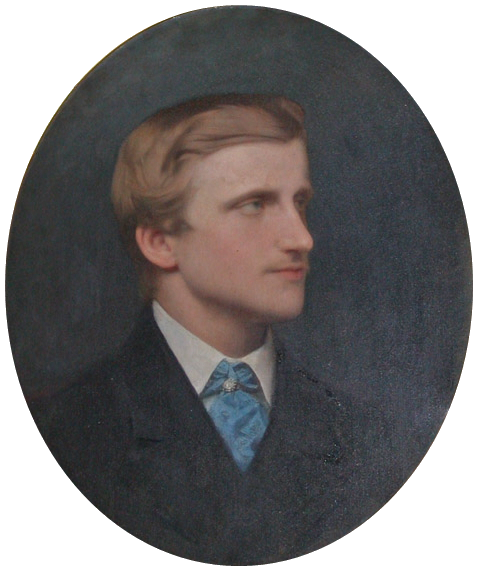
Portrait by Charles Jalabert

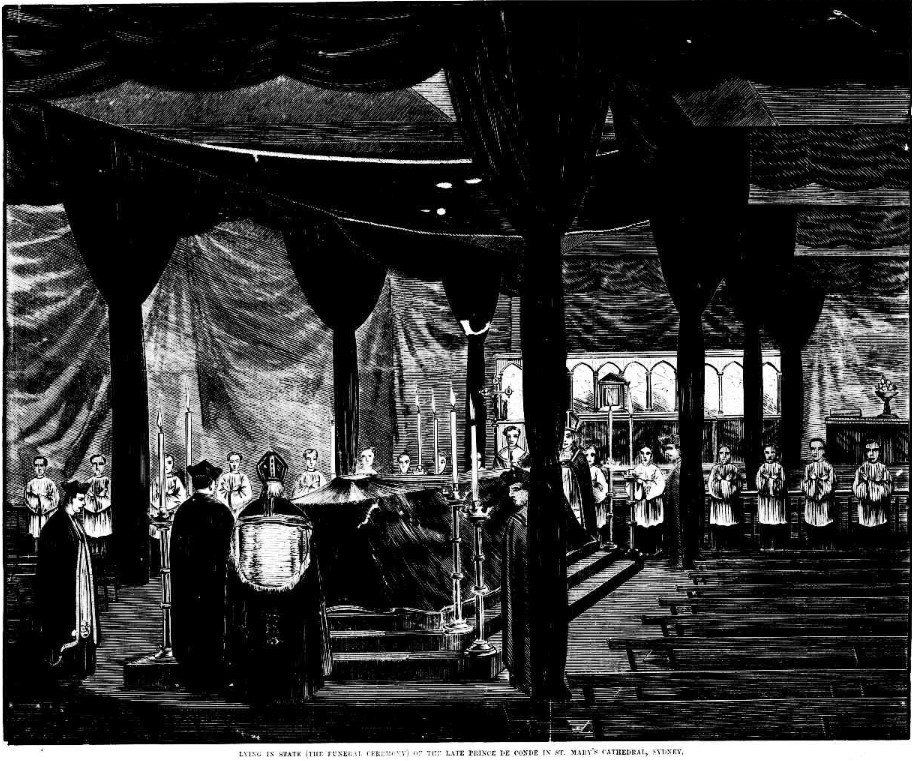
Prince de Conde, 1866, St Mary's Cathedral Sydney

The funeral took place on 29 May 1866. A long procession, led by Bishop Aloys Elloy and about 20 clerics, accompanied the coffin from Petty's Hotel to Saint Mary's Cathedral. Amongst the coffin bearers were the Governor, the Chief Justice, the Premier, Commodore Sir William Wiseman and the Belgian consul. Many businesses in Sydney closed during the funeral and the consulates lowered their flags to half mast.

Two thousand attended the requiem mass in Saint Mary's Cathedral. Because Archbishop John Bede Polding was in Rome at the time, he was represented at the service by Aloys Elloy. After the end of the service the coffin and the silver container that held the heart of Louis d'Orléans were taken on board the Sea Star which was anchored at Circular Quay. On 2 June 1866 the Sea Star set sail for London with d'Orléans' remains. Also on board were Dr. Gingeot and the prince's retinue. The Sea Star arrived in London on 11 September 1866.

After the end of the Second French Empire and the Paris Commune the family of Louis d'Orléans returned to France in 1871 from their exile in England. In 1885, the urn that contained the hearts of the Princes of Condé was placed in the chapel of Château de Chantilly. Here, too, is the final resting place of Louis d'Orléans' heart.

His mortal remains are in Chapelle Royale Saint-Louis in Dreux.

=== Legacy ===
Louis d'Orléans is primarily remembered for his visit to Australia. He was the first member of a royal house to visit the Australian continent. The first visit by a member of the British royal family was in 1867 by Prince Alfred, who reached Australia in October that year and stayed there for five months.

== Ancestry ==
Ancestors of Louis d'Orléans, Prince of Condé

8. Louis Philippe II, Duke of Orléans
4. Louis Philippe I of France
9. Louise Marie Adélaïde de Bourbon
2. Henri, Duke of Aumale
10. Ferdinand I of the Two Sicilies
5. Marie Amélie of Naples and Sicily
11. Maria Carolina of Austria
1. Louis, Prince of Condé
12. Ferdinand I of the Two Sicilies (= 10)
6. Leopold, Prince of Salerno
13. Maria Carolina of Austria (= 11)
3. Maria Carolina of the Two Sicilies
14. Francis II, Holy Roman Emperor
7. Maria Clementina of Austria
15. Maria Theresa of Naples and Sicily
