= Maria Clementina of Austria =

Maria Clementina of Austria may refer to:

- Archduchess Maria Clementina of Austria, Hereditary Princess of Naples (1777-1801)
- Archduchess Clementina, Princess of Salerno, Archduchess Maria Clementina of Austria, Princess of Salerno (1798-1881)
