= Prince François =

Prince François may refer to:

- Prince François of Luxembourg (born 2023), son of Guillaume, Hereditary Grand Duke of Luxembourg
- François d'Orléans, Prince of Joinville
- Prince François, Count of Clermont
- François de Rohan, 1st Prince of Soubise
- François de Bourbon, Prince of Conti
- François d'Orléans (1854–1872)
- François de Noailles, Prince of Poix
- François Hollande, co-prince of Andorra
