= Princes of Condé =

Cadet branch of the House of Bourbon

House of Bourbon-Condé
- Parent house: House of Bourbon (Note: The Bourbons were, themselves, descended from the Capetian dynasty)
- Origin: Condé-en-Brie, France
- Founded: 1557; 469 years ago
- Founder: Louis I de Bourbon, Prince of Condé
- Final head: Louis Henri de Bourbon, Prince of Condé
- Titles: Prince of Condé; Prince of La Roche-sur-Yon; Duke of Enghien; Duke of Bourbon; Duke of Montmorency; Duke of Mercœur; Marquis of Graville; Count of La Marche; Count of Pézenas; Count of Alais; Count of Clermont; Prince du sang
- Properties: Château de Chantilly; Château de Condé; Château de Vallery; Hôtel de Bourbon-Condé; Hôtel de Condé; Palais Bourbon
- Dissolution: 1830; 196 years ago
- Cadet branches: Princes of Conti; Counts of Soissons

The Most Serene House of Bourbon-Condé (pronounced [buʁbɔ̃ kɔ̃de]), named after Condé-en-Brie (now in the Aisne département), was a French princely house and a cadet branch of the House of Bourbon. The name of the house was derived from the title of Prince of Condé (French: prince de Condé) that was originally assumed around 1557 by the French Protestant leader Louis de Bourbon (1530–1569), uncle of King Henry IV of France, and borne by his male-line descendants.

This line became extinct in 1830 when his eighth-generation descendant, Louis Henri Joseph de Bourbon, died without surviving male issue. The princely title was held for one last time by Louis d'Orléans, Prince of Condé, who died in 1866.

== History ==
The Princes of Condé descend from the Vendôme family – the progenitors of the modern House of Bourbon. There was never a principality, sovereign or vassal, of Condé. The name merely served as the territorial source of a title adopted by Louis, who inherited from his father, Charles IV de Bourbon, duc de Vendôme (1489–1537), the lordship of Condé-en-Brie in Champagne, consisting of the Château of Condé and a dozen villages some fifty miles east of Paris.

It had passed from the sires of Avesnes, to the Counts of St. Pol. When Marie de Luxembourg-St. Pol wed François, Count of Vendôme (1470–1495) in 1487, Condé-en-Brie became part of the Bourbon-Vendôme patrimony.

=== Duc de Bourbon ===
After the extinction in 1527 of the Dukes of Bourbon, François's son Charles (1489–1537) became head of the House of Bourbon, which traces its male-line descent from Robert, Count of Clermont (1256–1318), a younger son of France's Saint-King Louis IX. Of the sons of Charles of Vendôme, the eldest, Antoine, became jure uxoris King of Navarre and fathered Henry IV.

Arms of the princes de Condé, 1546-1588

The youngest son, Louis, inherited the lordships of Meaux, Nogent, Condé, and Soissons as his appanage. Louis was titled Prince of Condé in a parliamentary document on 15 January 1557 and, without any legal authority beyond their dignity as princes of the Blood Royal, they continued to bear it for the next three centuries. He was succeeded by his son Henri I, Prince of Condé.

Louis, the first Prince, actually gave the Condé property to his youngest son, Charles (1566–1612), Count of Soissons. Charles' only son Louis (1604–1641) left Condé and Soissons to female heirs in 1624, who married into the Savoy and Orléans-Longueville dynasties.

=== Monsieur le Prince ===
Upon the accession to France's throne of Henry IV of Bourbon in 1589, his first cousin-once-removed Henry, Prince of Condé (1588-1646), was heir presumptive to the crown until 1601. Although Henry's own descendants thereafter held the senior positions within the royal family of Dauphin, Fils de France, and Petits-Fils de France, from 1589 to 1709 the Princes of Condé coincidentally held the rank at court of premier prince du sang royal (First Prince of the Blood Royal), to which was attached income, precedence, and ceremonial privilege (such as the exclusive right to be addressed as Monsieur le Prince at court).

Arms of the Princes de Condé and Ducs de Bourbon, 1588-1830

Arms of the heir to the Prince de Condé and Duc de Bourbon, 1588-1830, usually titled the Duc d'Enghien

However, the position of premier prince du sang devolved upon the ducs d'Orléans in 1710, so the seventh Prince, Louis III (1668-1710) declined to make use of the title, preferring instead to be known by his hereditary peerage of Duke of Bourbon, which still afforded him the right to be known as Monsieur le Duc. Subsequent heirs likewise preferred the ducal to the princely title.

=== Later ===
After the death of Henry III Jules de Bourbon, prince de Condé in 1709, the family were in regular attendance at court. Louis de Bourbon-Condé (at that point known as the Duke of Bourbon) had in 1685 married Louise-Françoise de Bourbon, the legitimated daughter of Louis XIV and Madame de Montespan.

The couple had many children and produced an heir to the Condé titles and lands. Their son was Louis Henri de Bourbon-Condé, duc de Bourbon. He led a quiet life and was known at court as Monsieur le Duc after the loss of the rank of premier prince du sang in 1723. After his death the family retreated from court life but Louis Joseph, Prince of Condé was vital in the forming of the Army of Condé - formed to support his cousin Louis XVI during his imprisonment during the revolution. He was the longest holder of the title, being known as the prince de Condé for seventy-eight years.

His son married the sister of Louis Philippe II d'Orléans better known as Philippe Égalité. She was called Louise Marie Thérèse Bathilde d'Orléans. She was the last princesse de Condé and mother of Louis-Antoine-Henri de Bourbon-Condé - titled duc d'Enghien. He was executed by Napoleon, Emperor of the French, at the Château de Vincennes. With the death of the duc d'Enghien, the heir to the Condé name, his father was the last holder of the title.

After his death in 1830 the Condé lands passed to the last prince's cousin Henri Eugène Philippe Louis d'Orléans, duc d'Aumale whose eldest son Louis was later a prince de Condé after gaining the title from his father.

== Simplified Bourbon family tree ==
=== From Louis IX to Charles X ===
Direct Capetians
Louis IX; King of France; 1214–1270 r. 1226–1270	Margaret of Provence; 1221–1295
House of Bourbon
Philip III; King of France; 1245–1285 r. 1270–1285	Robert; Count of Clermont; 1256–1317 r. 1268–1317	Beatrice of Burgundy; 1257–1310
House of Valois
Charles; Count of Valois; 1270–1325 r. 1284–1325	Louis I Duke of Bourbon; 1279–1341 r. 1327–1341	Mary of Avesnes; 1280–1354
Philip VI; King of France; 1293–1350 r. 1328–1350
John II; King of France; 1319–1364 r. 1350–1364	Isabella of Valois; 1313–1383	Peter I Duke of Bourbon; 1311–1356 r. 1342–1356	James I Count of La Marche; 1319–1362 r. 1356–1362	Jeanne of Châtillon; 1320-1371
Charles V King of France; 1338–1380 r. 1364–1380	Joanna of Bourbon; 1338–1378	Louis II; Duke of Bourbon; 1337–1410 r. 1356–1410	Peter II; Count of La Marche; 1342–1362 r. 1362	John I Count of La Marche; 1344–1393 r. 1362–1393	Catherine of Vendôme; 1354–1412
Charles VI; King of France; 1368–1422 r. 1380–1422	John I Duke of Bourbon; 1381–1434 r. 1410–1434	Louis I Duke of Orléans; 1372–1407 r. 1392–1407	James II; Count of La Marche; 1370–1438 r. 1393–1438	Louis; Count of Vendôme; 1376–1446 r. 1393–1446	John; Lord of Carency; 1378–1458 r. 1393–1458
Charles VII; King of France; 1403–1461 r. 1422–1461	Charles I Duke of Bourbon; 1401–1456 r. 1434–1456	Louis I Count of Montpensier; 1405–1486 r. 1428–1486	John; Count of Angoulême; 1399–1467	Eleanor of Bourbon-La Marche; 1407–aft.1464	Lords of Carency
Louis XI; King of France; 1423–1483 r. 1461–1483	Joan of France; 1435–1482	John II; Duke of Bourbon; 1426–1488 r. 1456–1488	Charles II; Duke of Bourbon; 1433–1488 r. 1488	Louis; Bishop of Liège; 1438–1482 r. 1456–1482	Gilbert; Count of Montpensier; 1443–1496 r. 1486–1496	Charles; Count of Angoulême; 1459–1496 r. 1467–1496	Dukes of Nemours	John VIII; Count of Vendôme; 1425–1477 r. 1446–1477
Anne of France; 1461–1522	Peter II; Count of La Marche; Duke of Bourbon; 1438–1503 r. 1488–1503	Peter of Bourbon-Busset; 1464–1529	Francis; Count of Vendôme; 1470–1495 r. 1477–1495	Louis; Prince of La Roche-sur-Yon; 1473–1520	Louise; Duchess of Montpensier; 1482–1561 r. 1538–1561
Suzanne; Duchess of Bourbon; 1491–1521 r. 1503–1521	Charles III; Count of La Marche; Duke of Bourbon; 1490–1527 r. 1521–1527	Philip of Bourbon-Busset; 1494–1557	Francis I King of France; 1494–1547 r. 1515–1547	Charles; Duke of Vendôme; 1489–1537 r. 1514–1537	Louis; Duke of Montpensier; 1513-1582 r. 1561–1582
Bourbon-Busset illegitimate male-line	Henry II; King of France; 1519–1559 r. 1547–1559	Jeanne III d'Albret; Queen of Navarre; 1528–1572 r. 1555–1572	Antoine; Duke of Vendôme; King of Navarre; 1518–1562 r. 1555–1562	Louis; Prince of Condé; 1530–1569 r. 1546–1569	Dukes of Montpensier
Margaret of France; 1553–1615	Henry IV of Bourbon; King of France; 1553–1610 r. 1589–1610	Marie de' Medici; 1575–1642	Henri I Prince of Condé; 1552–1588 r. 1569–1588
Louis XIII; King of France; 1601–1643 r. 1610–1643	Henri II; Prince of Condé; 1588–1646 r. 1588–1646
Louis XIV; King of France; 1638–1715 r. 1643–1715	Louis II; Grand Condé; Prince of Condé; 1621–1686 r. 1646–1686	Armand; Prince of Conti; 1629–1666 r. 1629–1666	Philippe I 1640–1701; Duke of Orléans
Henri Jules; Prince of Condé; 1643–1709 r. 1686–1709
Louis; 1661-1711 "Grand Dauphin" of France	{{{La2}}}	Louise Bénédicte de Bourbon; 1676-1753	Louis III; Prince of Condé; 1668–1710 r. 1709–1710	Louise Françoise of Bourbon; 1673–1743	Marie Thérèse de Bourbon; 1666–1732	François Louis; Grand Conti; Prince of Conti; 1664–1709 r. 1685–1709	Louis Armand I Prince of Conti; 1661–1685 r. 1666–1685	Marie Anne de Bourbon; 1666–1739
Louis; 1682–1712; Duke of Burgundy, Dauphin of France	Philip V 1683–1746; King of Naples, Sardinia, and Spain	Louis IV Henri; Prince de Condé; 1692–1740 r. 1710–1740	Marie Anne de Bourbon; 1689–1720	Louise Élisabeth de Bourbon; 1693–1775	Louis Armand II; Prince of Conti; 1695–1727 r. 1709–1727
Louis XV; King of France; 1710-1774 r. 1715–1774	Louis V Joseph; Prince of Condé; 1736–1818 r. 1740–1818	Louis François; Prince of Conti; 1717–1776 r. 1727–1776
Louis; 1729–1765; Dauphin of France	Maria Teresa of Spain; 1726–1746	Louis VI Henri; Prince of Condé; 1756–1830 r. 1818–1830	Louis François Joseph; Prince of Conti; 1734–1814 r. 1776–1814
Louis XVI; King of France; 1754–1793 r. 1774–1792	Louis XVIII; King of France; 1755–1824 r. 1815–1824	Charles X King of France; 1757–1836 r. 1824–1830	Louis Antoine; Duke of Enghien; 1772–1804

=== Descent from Henry IV ===
see also:Family tree of Spanish monarchs

Henry IV; King of France (1589–1610)
Louis XIII; King of France (1610–1643)
Louis XIV; King of France (1643–1715)	Philippe I Duke of Orléans
Louis "Le Grand Dauphin" of France	Philippe II; Duke of Orléans; Regent of France
Louis "Le Petit Dauphin" of France	Philip V King of Spain (1700–1746)	Louis; Duke of Orléans
Louis XV; King of France (1715–1774)	Louis I King of Spain (1724)	Ferdinand VI; King of Spain (1746–1759)	Charles III; King of Spain (1759–1788)	Philip; Duke of Parma (1748–1765)	Louis Philippe I Duke of Orléans
Louis; Dauphin of France	Charles IV; King of Spain (1788–1808)	Ferdinand; Duke of Parma (1765–1802)	Louis Philippe II (Philippe Égalité); Duke of Orléans
Louis XVI; King of France (1774–1791); King of the French (1791–1792); Titular King of France (1792–1793)	Louis XVIII; Titular King of France (1795–1804); Legitimist pretender (1804–1814); King of France (1814–1824)	Charles X King of France (1824–1830); Legitimist pretender (1830–1836)	Ferdinand VII; King of Spain (1808; 1813–1833)	Francisco de Paula	Carlos; Count of Molina Carlos V Carlist pretender (1833–1845)	Louis I King of Etruria (1801–1803)	Louis Philippe I King of the French (1830–1848); Orléanist pretender (1848–1850)
Louis; Dauphin of France as Louis XVII; Titular King of France (1793–1795)	Louis-Antoine; Duke of Angoulême Dauphin of France as Louis XIX; Legitimist pretender (1836–1844)	Charles Ferdinand; Duke of Berry	Isabella II; Queen of Spain (1833–1868)	Francis; Duke of Cádiz; King consort of Spain	Carlos; Count of Montemolin Carlos VI; Carlist pretender (1845–1861)	Juan; Count of Montizón Juan III; Carlist pretender (1861–1868) as Jean III; Legitimist pretender (1883–1887)	Louis II; King of Etruria (1803–1807) Charles I Duke of Lucca (1824–1847) Charles II; Duke of Parma (1847–1849)	Ferdinand Philippe; Duke of Orléans
Henri; Count of Chambord as Henri V Legitimist pretender (1844–1883)	Alfonso XII; King of Spain (1874–1885)	Carlos; Duke of Madrid Carlos VII; Carlist pretender (1868–1909) as Charles XI; Legitimist pretender (1887–1909)	Alfonso Carlos; Duke of San Jaime Alfonso Carlos I Carlist pretender (1931–1936) as Charles XII; Legitimist pretender (1931–1936)	Charles III; Duke of Parma (1849–1854)	Philippe; Count of Paris as Philippe VII; Orléanist pretender (1850–1894)	Robert; Duke of Chartres
Alfonso XIII; King of Spain (1886–1931) as Alphonse I Legitimist pretender (1936–1941)	Jaime; Duke of Madrid Jaime III; Carlist pretender (1909–1931) as Jacques I Legitimist pretender (1909–1931)	Robert I Duke of Parma (1854–1859)	Philippe; Duke of Orléans as Philippe VIII; Orléanist pretender (1894–1926)	Jean; Duke of Guise as Jean III; Orléanist pretender (1926–1940)
Jaime; Duke of Segovia Jaime IV; Carlist pretender (1941–1969) as Jacques II or Henri VI; Legitimist pretender (1941–1975)	Juan; Count of Barcelona	Xavier; Duke of Parma; Carlist regent (1936–1952) Javier I Carlist pretender (1952–1977)	Felix; Prince of Luxembourg	Henri; Count of Paris as Henri VI; Orléanist pretender (1940–1999)
Alfonso; Duke of Anjou and Cádiz as Alphonse II; Legitimist pretender (1975–1989)	Juan Carlos I King of Spain (1975–2014)	Carlos Hugo; Duke of Parma Carlos Hugo I Carlist pretender (1977–1979)	Sixtus Henry; Prince of Parma Enrique V Carlist pretender (1979–present)	Jean; Grand Duke of Luxembourg (1964–2000)	Henri; Count of Paris; Duke of France as Henri VII; Orléanist pretender (1999–2019)
Louis; Duke of Anjou as Louis XX; Legitimist pretender (1989–present)	Felipe VI; King of Spain (2014–present)	Carlos; Duke of Parma Carlos Xavier II; Carlist pretender (2011–present)	Henri; Grand Duke of Luxembourg (2000–2025)	Jean; Count of Paris as Jean IV; Orléanist pretender (2019–present)
Louis; Duke of Burgundy; Dauphin of France	Leonor; Princess of Asturias	Carlos; Prince of Piacenza	Guillaume V Grand Duke of Luxembourg (2025–present)	Gaston; Count of Clermont

== Cadet branches ==
Arms of the Counts of Soissons (1569-1641); at the extinction of their line, it was adopted by the Princes of Conti until they became extinct in 1814.

=== House of Bourbon-Conti ===
The House of Bourbon-Conti was formed in 1581 by François de Bourbon, prince de Conti. He was the son of Louis I de Bourbon, prince de Condé. The house became extinct in 1814 upon the death of Louis François II de Bourbon, prince de Conti.

The Princes of Conti were as follows:

- 1558–1614: marquis, then from 1581 onwards 1st prince François de Bourbon.

At his death, the title became extinct because the prince died without issue. The title was assumed in 1629 by:

- 1629–1666: 2nd prince Armand de Bourbon-Conti
- 1666–1685: 3rd prince Louis Armand I de Bourbon-Conti
- 1685–1709: 4th prince Francis Louis de Bourbon-Conti
- 1709–1727: 5th prince Louis Armand II de Bourbon-Conti
- 1727–1776: 6th prince Louis Francis I de Bourbon-Conti
- 1776–1814: 7th prince Louis Francis II de Bourbon-Conti

=== House of Bourbon-Soissons ===
The first prince de Conti was also the brother of the founder of the House of Bourbon-Soissons, Charles de Bourbon-Soissons. The comtes de Soissons were addressed at court as Monsieur le Comte and their wives as Madame la Comtesse. The members of the house were:

- 1487–1495: François de Bourbon-Vendôme (1470–1495);
- 1495–1537: Charles de Bourbon-Vendôme (1489–1537), comte (jure matris), son of the preceding;
- 1547–1557: Jean de Bourbon-Soissons (1528–1557), son of the preceding;
- 1557–1569: Louis I, Prince of Condé (1530–1569), brother of the preceding;
- 1569–1612: Charles, Count of Soissons (1566–1612), son of the preceding;
- 1612–1641: Louis, Count of Soissons (1604–1641), son of the preceding;
- 1641–1656: Marie de Bourbon-Soissons (1606–1692), sister of the preceding.

The line started in 1566 when the title of Count of Soissons was given to Charles de Bourbon-Condé, the second son of Louis I, the first Prince of Condé. The Soissons title had been acquired by the first Prince of Condé in 1557 and was held by his descendants for two more generations with Charles de Bourbon-Condé, 1st comte de Soissons, and Louis de Bourbon-Condé, 2nd comte de Soissons.

The 2nd comte de Soissons died without an heir, so the Soissons estates passed to his younger sister, Marie de Bourbon-Condé, the wife of Thomas Francis, Prince of Carignano, a younger brother of the sovereign Duke of Savoy. Although she received 400,000 livres in annual revenues from the Soissons estates, lived in the Hôtel de Soissons where, according to Saint-Simon, she "maintained the traditions of the Soissons", she continued to be known as the princesse de Carignan. On her death, the Soissons countship passed first to her second son, Prince Joseph-Emmanuel of Savoy-Carignano (1631–1656), and then to her third son, Prince Eugène-Maurice of Savoy-Carignano. He married Olympia Mancini, niece of Cardinal Mazarin. She was known as Madame la Comtesse de Soissons. On his death, the title went to his eldest son, Prince Louis Thomas of Savoy-Carignano, who was the older brother of the famous Austrian general, Prince Eugene of Savoy. The Soissons countship became extinct upon the death of Prince Eugène-Jean-François of Savoy-Carignano in 1734.

== Princes of Condé ==
=== First creation: 1546–1830 – House of Bourbon ===
Name	Portrait	Lifespan	Parents
Louis I de Bourbon; 1546–1569		May 7, 1530 – March 13, 1569	Charles de Bourbon-La Marche; Françoise d'Alençon
Henri I de Bourbon; 1569–1588		December 29, 1552 – March 5, 1588	Louis I de Bourbon; Eléanor de Roucy de Roye
Henri II de Bourbon; 1588–1646		September 1, 1588 – December 26, 1646	Henri I de Bourbon; Charlotte Catherine de La Trémoille
Louis II de Bourbon; 1646–1686		September 8, 1621 – November 11, 1686	Henri II de Bourbon; Charlotte Marguerite de Montmorency
Henri Jules de Bourbon; 1686–1709		July 29, 1643 – April 1, 1709	Louis II de Bourbon; Claire-Clémence de Maillé-Brézé
Louis III de Bourbon; 1709–1710		November 10, 1668 – March 4, 1710	Henri Jules de Bourbon; Anne Henriette of Bavaria
Louis Henri de Bourbon; 1710–1740		August 18, 1692 – January 27, 1740	Louis III de Bourbon; Louise-Françoise de Bourbon
Louis Joseph de Bourbon; 1740–1818		August 9, 1736 – May 13, 1818	Louis Henri de Bourbon; Landgravine Caroline of Hesse-Rotenburg
Louis Henri Joseph de Bourbon; 1818–1830		April 13, 1756 – August 30, 1830	Louis Joseph de Bourbon; Charlotte Élisabeth Godefride de Rohan daughter of Charles de Rohan

=== Second creation: 1845 –1866 – House of Orléans ===
Name	Portrait	Lifespan	Parents
Louis d'Orléans		November 15, 1845 – May 24, 1866	Prince Henri, Duke of Aumale; Princess Maria Carolina Augusta of Bourbon-Two Sicilies

== Styles of address ==
The eldest sons of the Princes of Condé used the title of Duke of Enghien and were addressed as Monsieur le Duc until that style came to be pre-empted by their fathers, as Dukes of Bourbon, after 1709. The Princes of Condé were also the male-line ancestors of the branches of the Princes of Conti (which flourished 1629–1814) and the Counts of Soissons (1566–1641).

Although both the sons and daughters of these branches of the House of Bourbon held the rank of princes et princesses du sang, it never became the custom in France for them to use prince or princess as a prefix to their Christian names. Rather, sons took a title of French nobility (count or duke), suffixed with their appanage (e.g. Count of Charolais), while unmarried daughters used one of their fathers' subsidiary properties to form a courtesy style (e.g. Mademoiselle de Clermont).

== Family residences ==
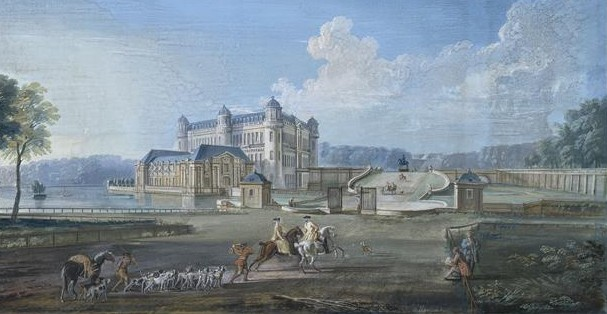
The Château de Chantilly at the time of the Grand Condé

The Hôtel de Condé became the Parisian base of the Condé family in 1610, in what is now the 6th district of Paris. In 1722, Louise-Françoise de Bourbon, wife of Louis III, Prince of Condé, started building the Palais Bourbon, which in 1764 became the Condé family's main Parisian residence. They sold the Hôtel de Condé to the King in 1770, and it was demolished around 1780 to be replaced by a new neighborhood around the theater that later became known as the Odéon. Another Parisian property, still known as the Hôtel de Bourbon-Condé (12 rue Monsieur), was built and inhabited between 1780 and 1789 by Louise Adélaïde de Bourbon-Condé.

The family had several residences outside Paris – the Château de Condé in Condé-en-Brie, Picardy, which they ceased to own by 1624; the Château de Vallery, built from 1548 for the Marshal of Saint André, acquired by Louis I de Bourbon-Condé in 1564 and kept by the family until 1747; and the Château de Chantilly, previously a Montmorency property from 1484 to 1632 and a Condé estate afterward. The latter was the home of the Grand Condé during his exile from court, and the host château of a party given in honour of King Louis XIV in 1671. It was confiscated during the French Revolution and eventually came into the possession of King Louis Philippe I, who gave it to his youngest son, Prince Henri, Duke of Aumale.
