= Prince Henri, Duke of Aumale =

French prince; fifth son of Louis Philippe I (1822-1897)

Henri d'Orléans
- Duke of Aumale
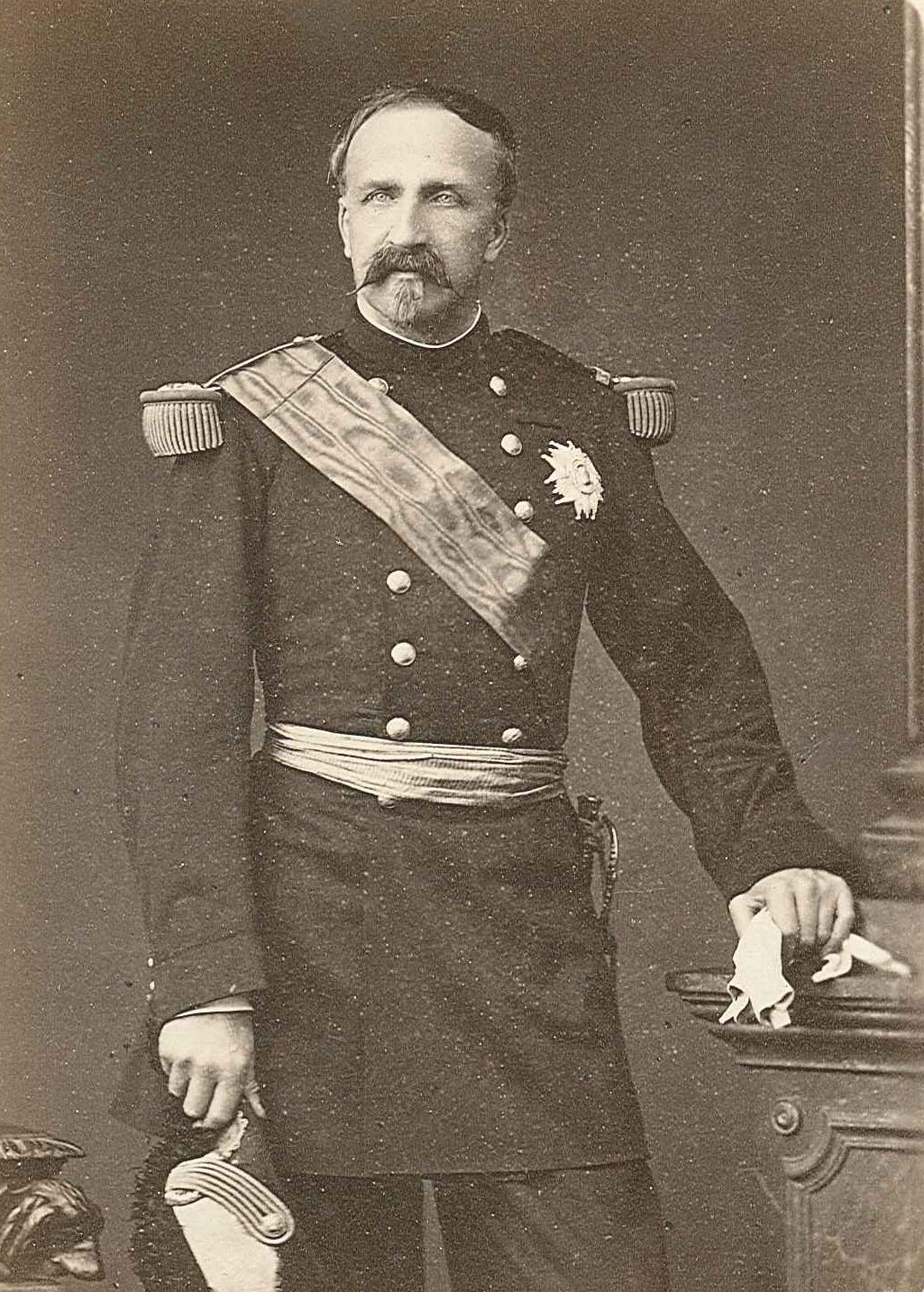
- Portrait by Appert, c. 1870
- Born: 16 January 1822; Palais Royal, Paris
- Died: 7 May 1897 (aged 75); Giardinello, Sicily
- Burial: Royal Chapel, Dreux, France
- Spouse: Carolina Augusta of the Two Sicilies (m. 1844; died 1869)
- Issue Among others...: Louis, Prince of Condé; François Louis, Duke of Guise
Names
- Henri Eugène Philippe Louis d'Orléans
- House: Orléans
- Father: Louis Philippe I
- Mother: Maria Amalia of Naples and Sicily
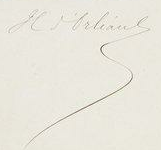
- Signature

Henri Eugène Philippe Louis d'Orléans, Duke of Aumale (16 January 1822 – 7 May 1897) was a leader of the Orleanists, a political faction in 19th-century France associated with constitutional monarchy. He was born in Paris, the fifth son of King Louis-Philippe I of the French and Maria Amalia of Naples and Sicily and used the title Duke of Aumale.

Aumale became an infantry officer and saw active service in the French conquest of Algeria and in 1847 was appointed as its Governor-General. After the French Revolution of 1848, he went to live in England, where he pursued historical interests. The Franco-Prussian War enabled him to return to France, where he was elected to parliament and the Académie française. In 1872, he returned to the army as a Divisional General, and from 1879 to 1883 was inspector-general of the army.

An important art collector, Aumale left his Château de Chantilly to the Institute of France, to display his collection.

== Early life ==
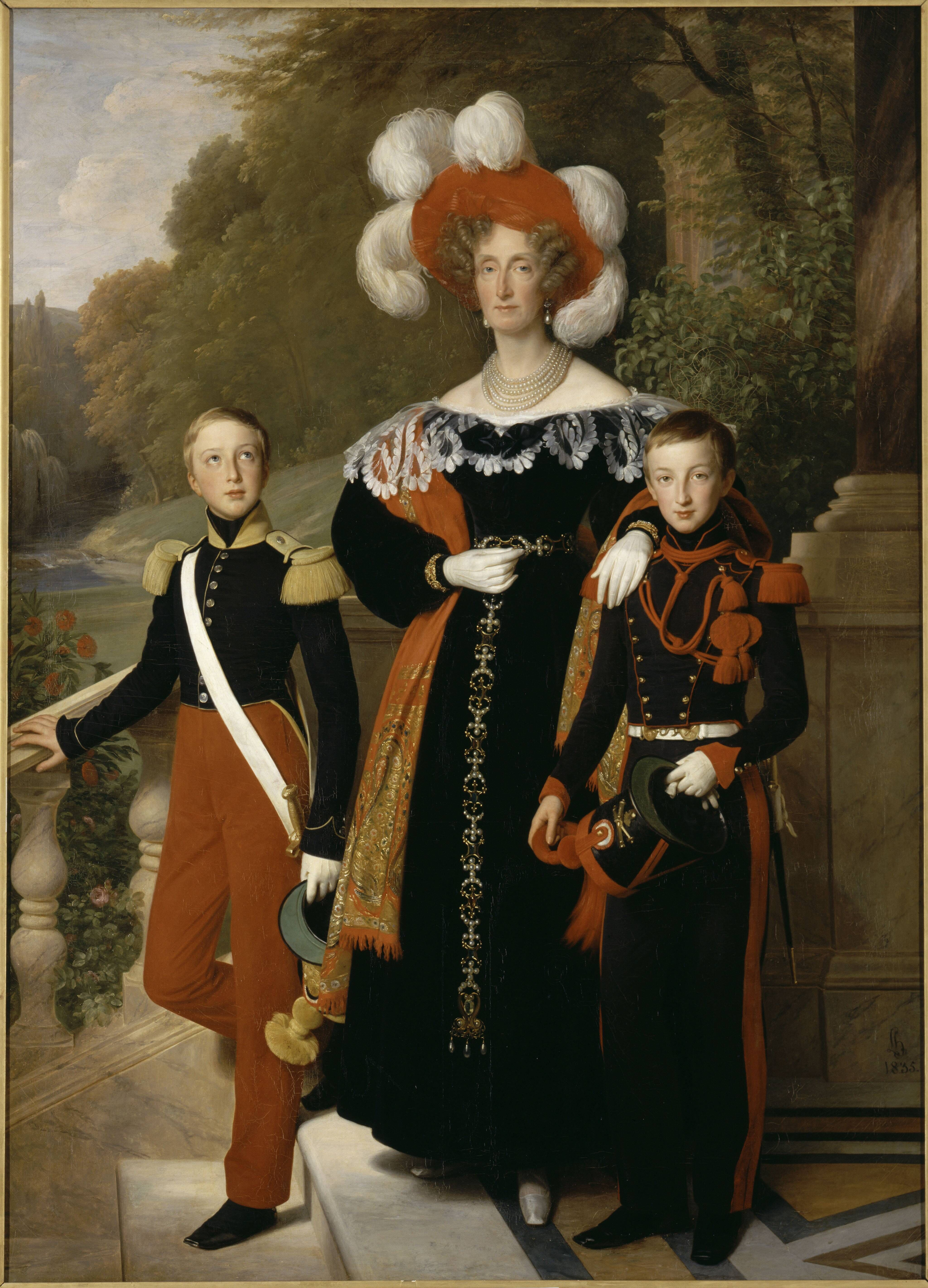
Henri (left) with his brother Antoine and his mother Queen Marie Amélie.

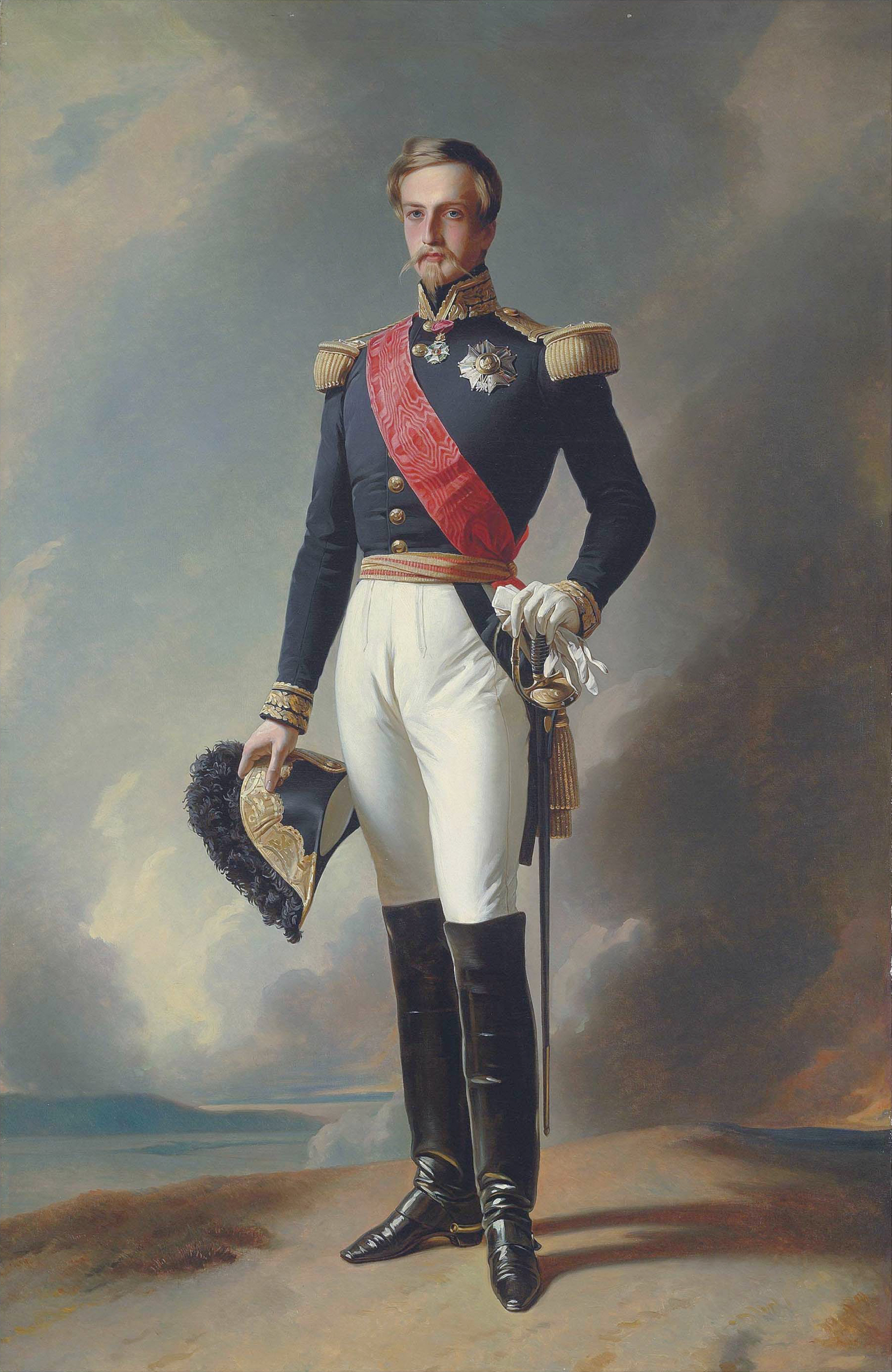
Portrait by Franz Xaver Winterhalter

Born on 16 January at the Palais Royal in Paris, he shared a birthday with his older brother Prince Charles. The young Henri was brought up by his parents in relative simplicity. At the age of eight, he inherited a fortune of 66 million livres (approximately £200 million today), the lands and wealth of his godfather, Louis Henri de Bourbon, Prince of Condé, the last Prince of Condé. This inheritance included the famous Château de Chantilly, the Château d'Écouen, and the domaines of Saint-Leu, Taverny, Enghien, Montmorency, and Mortefontaine.

He was educated at the Collège Henri IV, then at the age of seventeen, entered the French army with the rank of captain of infantry.

== Marriage and children ==
On 25 November 1844, aged 22, Aumale married in Naples his first cousin Princess Maria Carolina of the Two Sicilies, daughter of Leopold of the Two Sicilies, Prince of Salerno, and Archduchess Maria Clementina of Austria. They had several children, of whom two reached adulthood, but still predeceased him:

1. Louis Philippe Marie Léopold d'Orléans, Prince of Condé (15 November 1845 – 24 May 1866), died unmarried and childless.
2. Henri Léopold Philippe Marie d'Orléans, Duke of Guise (11 September 1847 – 10 October 1847), died in infancy.
3. Stillborn daughter (16 August 1850).
4. François Paul d'Orléans, Duke of Guise (11 January 1852 – 15 April 1852), died in infancy.
5. François Louis Philippe Marie d'Orléans, Duke of Guise (5 January 1854 – 25 July 1872), died unmarried.
6. Stillborn son (May 1857).
7. Stillborn son (15 June 1861).
8. Stillborn son (June 1864).

== Career ==
Aumale distinguished himself during the French invasion of Algeria and, in 1847, he became lieutenant-general and was appointed Governor-General of Algeria, a position he held from 27 September 1847 to 24 February 1848.

In this capacity, he received the submission of the emir Abdel Kadir, in December 1847. After the Revolution of 1848, he retired to England and busied himself with historical and military studies, responding in 1861 to Napoleon III's violent attacks upon the House of Orléans with a Letter upon History of France.

After the Bavarian-born King Otto of Greece was overthrown in October 1862, the Greeks still favoured a monarchy and wanted Prince Alfred, Duke of Edinburgh, as their new king, but he declined. In the search for a king, the French put forward the name of Aumale, while other contenders included Ernest II, Duke of Saxe-Coburg and Gotha, the Prince of Leiningen, and Archduke Maximilian of Austria. Eventually, the choice fell on Prince William of Denmark, aged only seventeen, and the Greek National Assembly elected him as the new King of the Hellenes in March 1863.

At the outbreak of the Franco-Prussian War, Aumale volunteered for service in the French army, but his offer was declined. Elected to parliament as deputy for the Oise, he returned to France. He also succeeded to the seat of the Count Montalembert in the Académie française.

In March 1872, he returned to the army as a Divisional General and in 1873 presided over the court-martial which condemned Marshal Bazaine to death.

At this time, having been appointed commander of the VII Army Corps at Besançon, Aumale retired from political life. In 1879, he became inspector-general of the army. The act of exception, passed in 1883, deprived all members of families who had reigned in France of their military commissions. Consequently, Aumale was placed on the unemployed supernumerary list.

In 1886, another law was promulgated which expelled from French territory the heads of former reigning families and provided that, henceforward, all members of those families should be disqualified from holding any public position or function and from election to any public body. Aumale protested energetically but was nonetheless expelled from France.

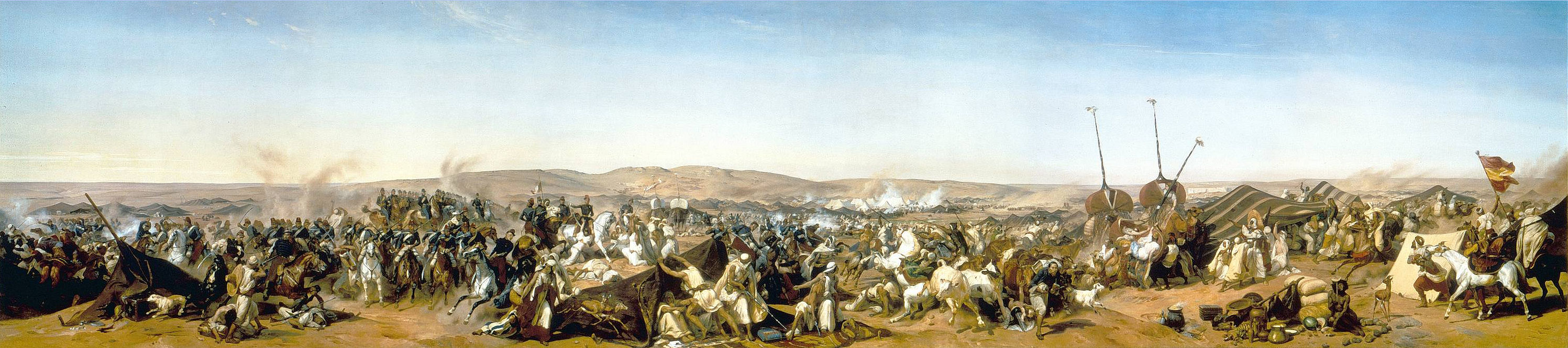
The Duc d'Aumale capturing the Smalah of Abdelkader with his chasseurs d'Afrique (1843), by Horace Vernet

In his will, written on 3 June 1884, Aumale had bequeathed his Chantilly estate to the Institute of France, including the Château de Chantilly, which was to be turned into a museum displaying his large art collection. After this act of generosity was revealed, the French government withdrew the decree of exile, and the duke returned to France in 1889.

== Bibliophile ==
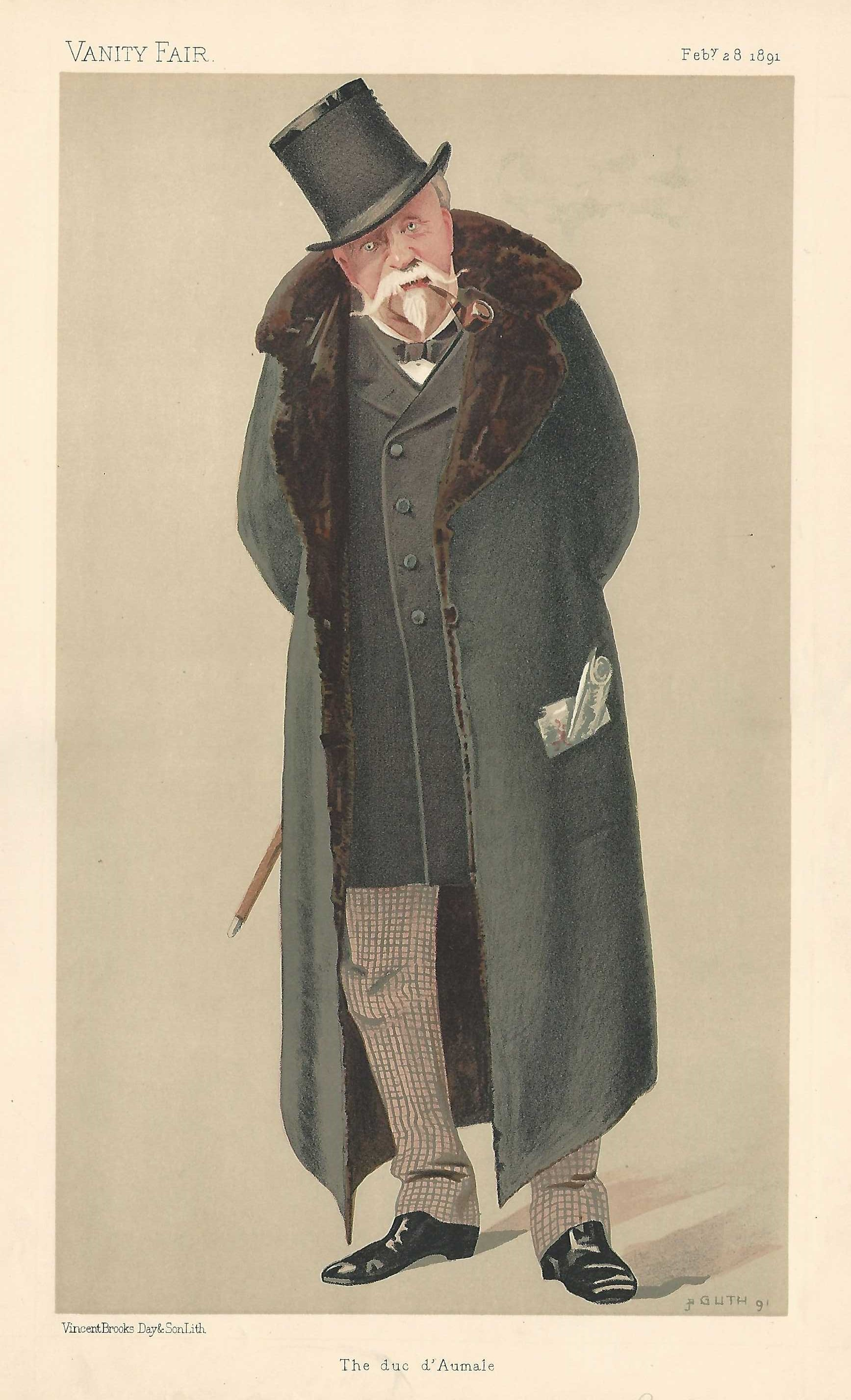
The duc d'Aumale in his final years, portrait by Jean Baptiste Guth in Vanity Fair, 1891

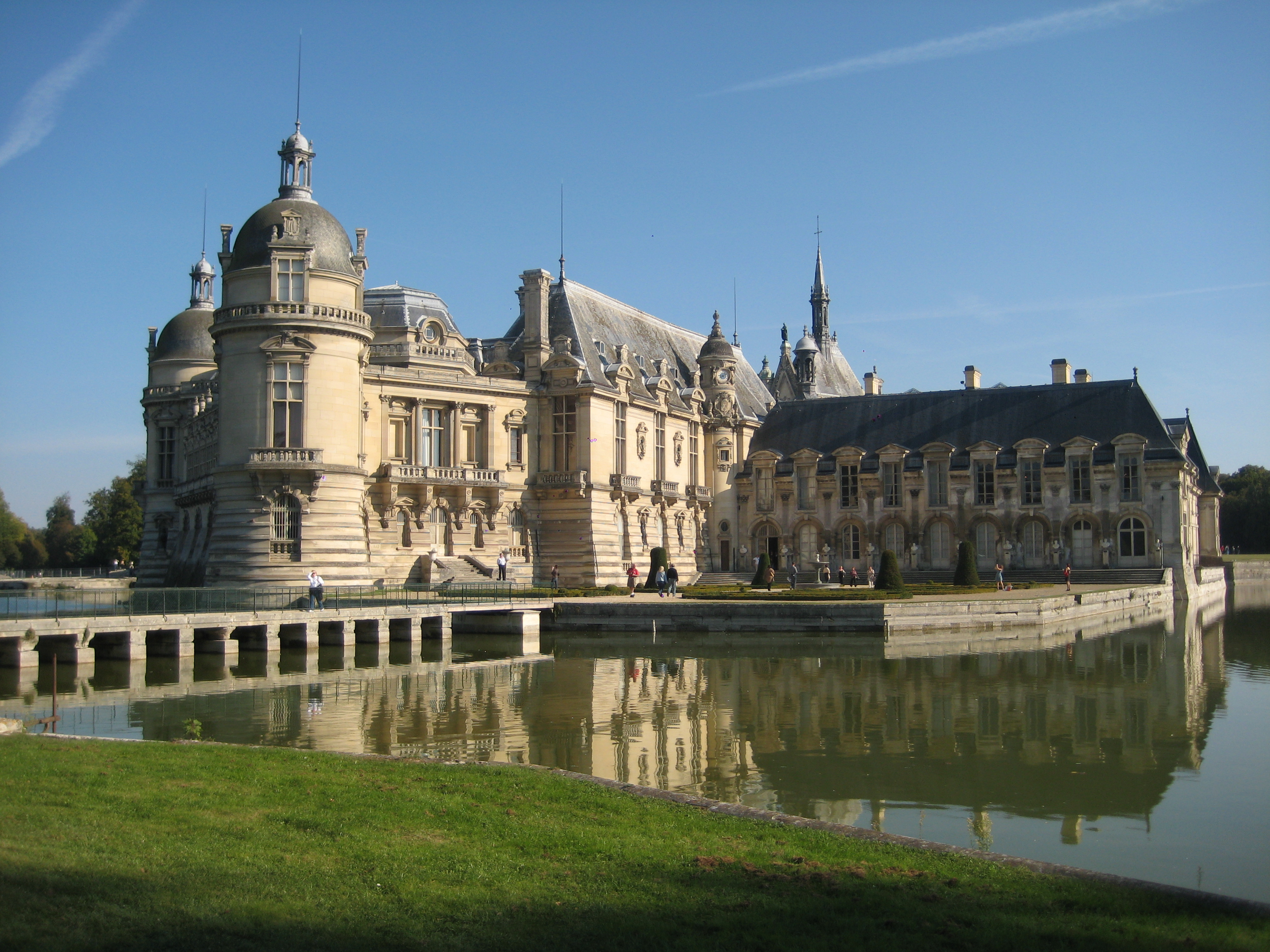
The Château of Chantilly houses one of the finest art collections in France.

Royal styles of Prince Henri, Duke of Aumale
- Reference style: His Royal Highness
- Spoken style: Your Royal Highness
- Alternative style: Sir

Aumale was a notable collector of antique books and manuscripts and owned the important medieval Très Riches Heures du Duc de Berry. He was a member of the Philobiblon Society a grouping of eminent members who represented royalty, aristocracy, diplomats, antiquarians, collectors and scholars. The Duke of Aumale was the main host, the society often met at his house, Orleans House, in Twickenham, where he not only provided outstanding meals but also showed quantities of the books he had recently acquired.

Most of his collection is still at Chantilly.

== Death ==
Henri d'Orléans, duc d'Aumale, died in Lo Zucco, Sicily. After the fire of the Bazar de la Charité on 4 May 1897, which killed 126 people, mostly aristocratic women, he wanted to send his condolences to the families of the victims. After writing twenty letters, he suffered a cardiac arrest and died. He was buried in Dreux, in the chapel of the Orléans.

== Honours ==
- 1842: Grand Cross of the Legion of Honour
- 22 March 1842: Grand Cordon of the Order of Leopold
- 6 September 1845: Knight of the Order of the Golden Fleece (Spanish branch)
- 1864: Grand Cross of the Saxe-Ernestine House Order
- 22 May 1886: Grand Cross of the Order of the Tower and Sword
- 1887: Member of the Royal Academy of Science, Letters and Fine Arts of Belgium.
- 1890: Charles Oberthür described & named parnassian butterfly P. orleans from China, named after the Duke who discovered it.
- Grand Cross of the Order of St. Ferdinand and Merit
- Recipient of the Husainid family order, Nichan ad-Dam
- Member of the Académie Française
- Member of the Académie des Sciences Morales et Politiques

== Arms ==
The duke of Aumale did not have a personal coat of arms, so used the traditional arms of the House of Orléans, consisting of:

- Blazon : Azure, three fleurs de lys or, a label argent
- Coronet : of a fils de France
- Supporters : two angels
- Personal motto (after 1871) : J'attendrai (I'll be waiting)

== Ancestry ==
Ancestors of Prince Henri, Duke of Aumale

8. Louis Philippe I, Duke of Orléans
4. Louis Philippe II, Duke of Orléans
9. Louise Henriette de Bourbon
2. Louis Philippe I of France
10. Louis Jean Marie, Duke of Penthièvre
5. Louise Marie Adélaïde de Bourbon
11. Maria Teresa Felicitas d'Este
1. Prince Henri, Duke of Aumale
12. Charles III of Spain
6. Ferdinand I of the Two Sicilies
13. Maria Amalia of Saxony
3. Maria Amalia of Naples and Sicily
14. Francis I, Holy Roman Emperor
7. Maria Carolina of Austria
15. Maria Theresa of Austria
