= Charles d'Orléans, Duke of Penthièvre =

French prince; fourth son of Louis Philippe I (1820-1828)

Charles d'Orléans
- Duke of Penthièvre
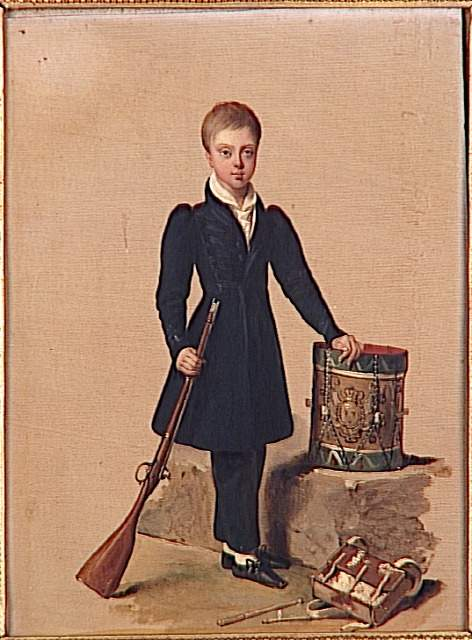
- Portrait c. 1827–28
- Born: 16 January 1820; Palais Royal, Paris, France
- Died: 25 July 1828 (aged 8); Château de Neuilly, Paris, France
- Burial: Royal Chapel, Dreux, France
Names
- Charles Ferdinand Louis Philippe Emmanuel d'Orléans
- House: Orléans
- Father: Louis Philippe, Duke of Orléans
- Mother: Maria Amalia of Naples and Sicily

Charles d'Orléans, Duke of Penthièvre (Charles Ferdinand Louis Philippe Emmanuel; 1 January 1820 – 25 July 1828) was the eighth child of the Duke and Duchess of Orléans, future Louis Philippe I and la Reine Marie Amélie. He was created Duke of Penthièvre, a title previously held by his great-grandfather.

== Biography ==
Charles d'Orléans was born at the Palais Royal in Paris, the official city residence of the Orléans family since 1692. Inside his family, he was nicknamed Pimpin.

He was the fourth of six sons born to the Orléans; Ferdinand Philippe born in 1810; the Duke of Nemours born in 1814; the Prince of Joinville born in 1818 who was followed by Charles. His younger brothers were the Duke of Aumale and the Duke of Montpensier. His oldest sister Princess Louise married Leopold I of Belgium. Another sister Princess Clémentine was the mother of Ferdinand I of Bulgaria. He was born one month premature and it was believed he would not live. Although he lived, he remained both physically weak and mentally disabled. He was cared by a servant named Joseph Uginet, who loved him greatly.

Charles was given the title of Duke of Penthièvre, which had passed to the House of Orléans by inheritance; Charles paternal grandmother Louise Marie Adélaïde de Bourbon, Duchess of Orléans as wife of Duke Louis Philippe II (Philippe Égalité), was a great heiress and inherited the Penthièvre fortune from her father prior to the Revolution. As such, the Orléans family were one of the wealthiest in Europe rivalling that of the mainline in the previous century.

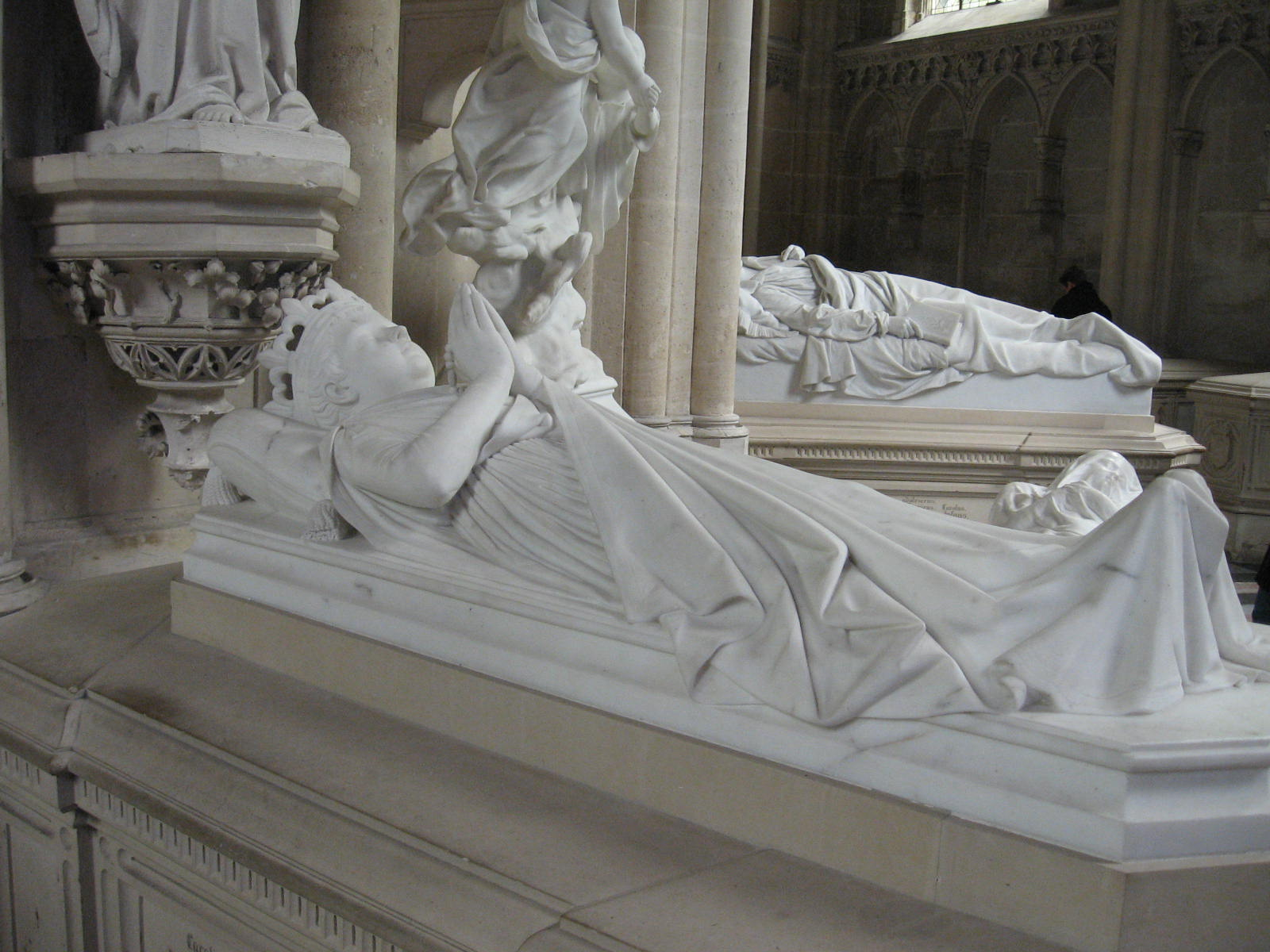
Charles' tomb at Dreux

He died at the Château de Neuilly on the outskirts of Paris in 1828 aged 8. Uginet wrote: "Pimpin dies from horrible spasms, July 25, 1828". Possible brides included his first cousin Princess Maria Carolina of the Two Sicilies, also born in 1820. She later married Infante Carlos Luis de Borbón, Count of Montemolin, but died childless. Charles was buried at the Royal Chapel of Dreux, burial place of the House of Orléans remodelled by his paternal grandmother Louise Marie Adélaïde de Bourbon, Duchess of Orléans whom he never met. Under two years after his death, his father became the King of the French on 9 August 1830.
