= Princess Maria Carolina of the Two Sicilies (born 1822) =

Duchess of Aumale (1822–1869)

Princess Maria Carolina Augusta
- Duchess of Aumale
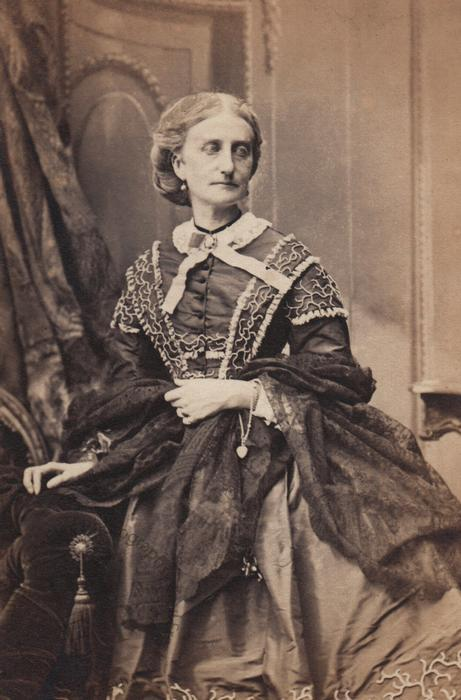
- Born: 26 April 1822; Vienna, Austrian Empire
- Died: 6 December 1869 (aged 47); Twickenham, London, England
- Burial: Chapelle royale de Dreux
- Spouse: Prince Henri, Duke of Aumale (m. 1844)
- Issue Among others...: Louis, Prince of Condé; François Louis, Duke of Guise
- House: Bourbon-Two Sicilies
- Father: Leopold, Prince of Salerno
- Mother: Archduchess Maria Clementina of Austria
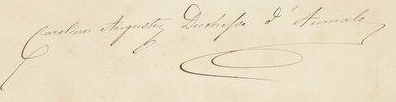
- Signature

Princess Maria Carolina Augusta of Bourbon-Two Sicilies (26 April 1822 – 6 December 1869) was a Princess of Bourbon-Two Sicilies by birth and a princess of the House of Orléans through her marriage to Prince Henry of Orléans, Duke of Aumale. She was the daughter of Leopold, Prince of Salerno and Archduchess Clementina of Austria, and was their only child to survive to adulthood.

== Life ==
=== Youth and marriage ===
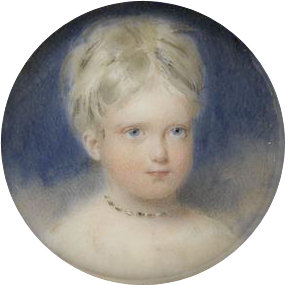
Portrait miniature of Maria Carolina Augusta in her early years. The miniature is undated and the artist is unknown.

Maria Carolina was born in Vienna on 26 April 1822, the only surviving child of Leopold, Prince of Salerno and his wife and niece Archduchess Maria Clementina of Austria.

Nicknamed Lina since her birth, the Princess spent the first years of her life under the supervision of her mother in the Austrian Imperial court at Vienna and was officially introduced there in society. As a teenager, she returned with her family in Naples.

In the 1830s and 1840s, there were not many princesses from European nobility who were in a marriageable age, allowing Maria Carolina to receive several suitors for her hand. The choice finally fell on Prince Henry, Duke of Aumale, fifth and second-youngest son of King Louis-Philippe I of France and his wife Maria Amalia of the Two Sicilies, who became impressed with her during a stay at her father's palace in Naples. The marriage negotiations began in late August 1844, and on 17 September of the same year at the Revue de Paris, their engagement was officially announced. The union was anything but a love match. Henri d'Orléans described his wife in a letter to his teacher Alfred-Auguste de Cuvillier-Fleury as "not nice, but nothing unpleasant about herself". Cuvillier-Fleury agreed with him, adding that she also had an "exquisite appearance". Henry agreed to the marriage only after intense pressure from his parents after they rejected other candidates. Finally opting for the small and graceful Maria Carolina to forestall any other marriage proposals to her from other European princes.

The marriage took place on 25 November 1844 in Naples at the request of the groom, although Maria Carolina's future in-laws would have preferred that the marriage would be celebrated in Paris. The civil wedding was performed in the royal palace of King Ferdinand II of the Two Sicilies, and on the same day, the religious ceremony was celebrated with great pomp. The bride received the large amount of 517,000 gold francs as a dowry. The festivities on the occasion of the wedding, such as balls, receptions, hunting events or theater galas, lasted more than two weeks. However, Maria Carolina travelled already on 2 December 1844 together with her husband by ship to Toulon. From there, the newlyweds had a grand reception by the city to Paris, where they settled in a series of rooms at the Tuileries Palace.

=== First years of marriage and children ===
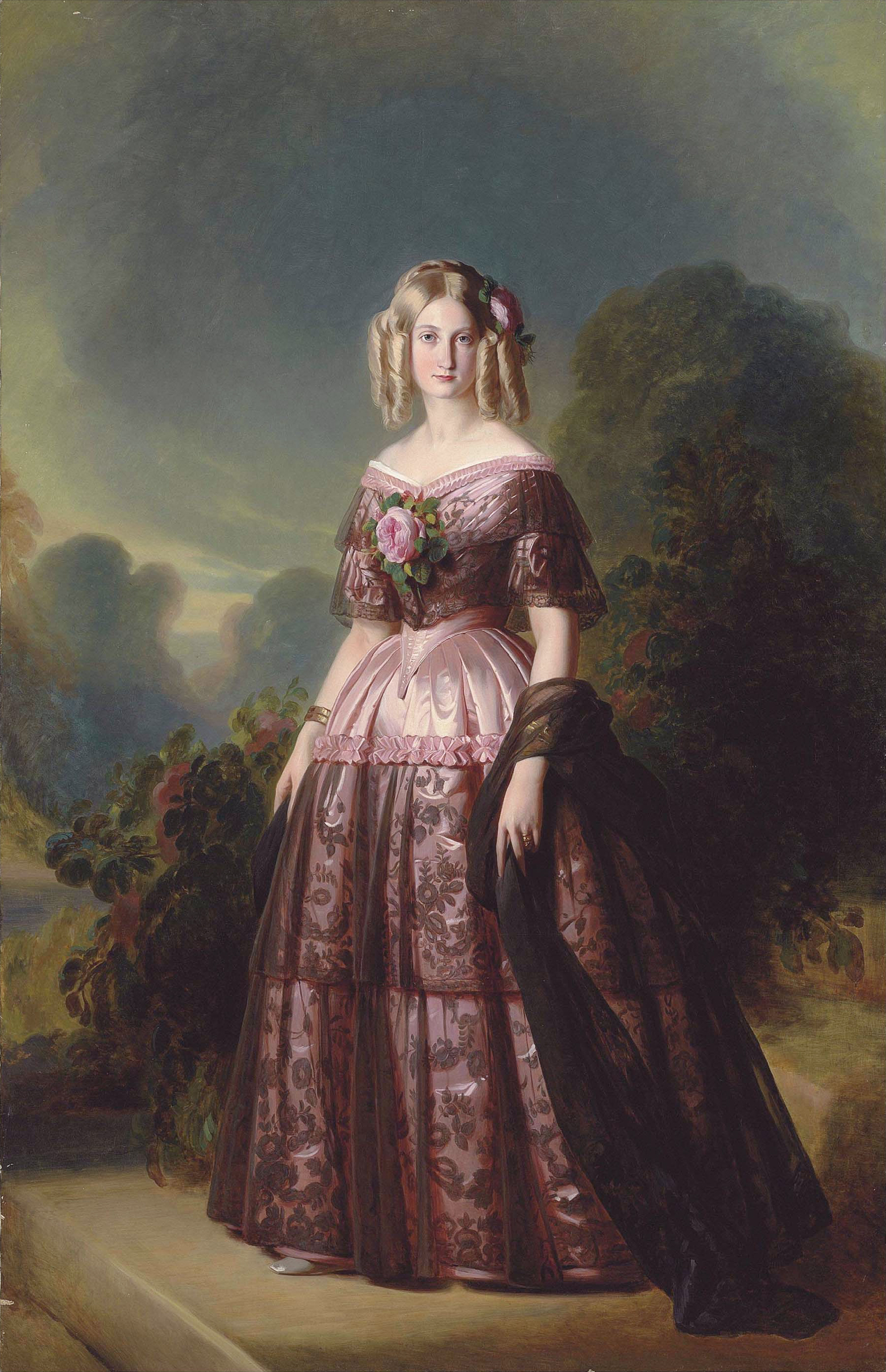
Portrait of Maria Carolina around the time of her marriage, by Franz Xaver Winterhalter

During the first months of 1845, which for Maria Carolina were filled by ceremonial duties at official occasions such as balls, theatrical performances or meetings with nobles, she and her husband had finally the opportunity to know each other better. They developed a mutual respect, and during all their years together, the Princess was a faithful and devoted wife who never made claims. Her charming ways, gentleness and kindness, gained the love of her husband's family. Contemporaries described her as amiable and witty. In May 1845 she moved with her husband to the Château de Chantilly, which Henry specially rebuilt and modernized for her. During that summer Queen Victoria and her husband were passing by France from their trip to Germany stayed for a night with the French royal family, according to her diary she describe of meeting Marie Carolina of the first time "who is a good bit smaller than me, very, very, fair & not at all pretty, but very pleasing; she has light blue eyes, a large nose & not a pretty mouth." but later wrote that "Lina is really very amiable; she speaks German de préférence, having been born in Germany — at Vienna — & having always lived there." They would become lifelong friends.

Maria Karolina remained at her husband's side after he was appointed in September 1847 Governor General of Algeria and therefore his presence in that country was necessary.

=== Exile in England and death ===
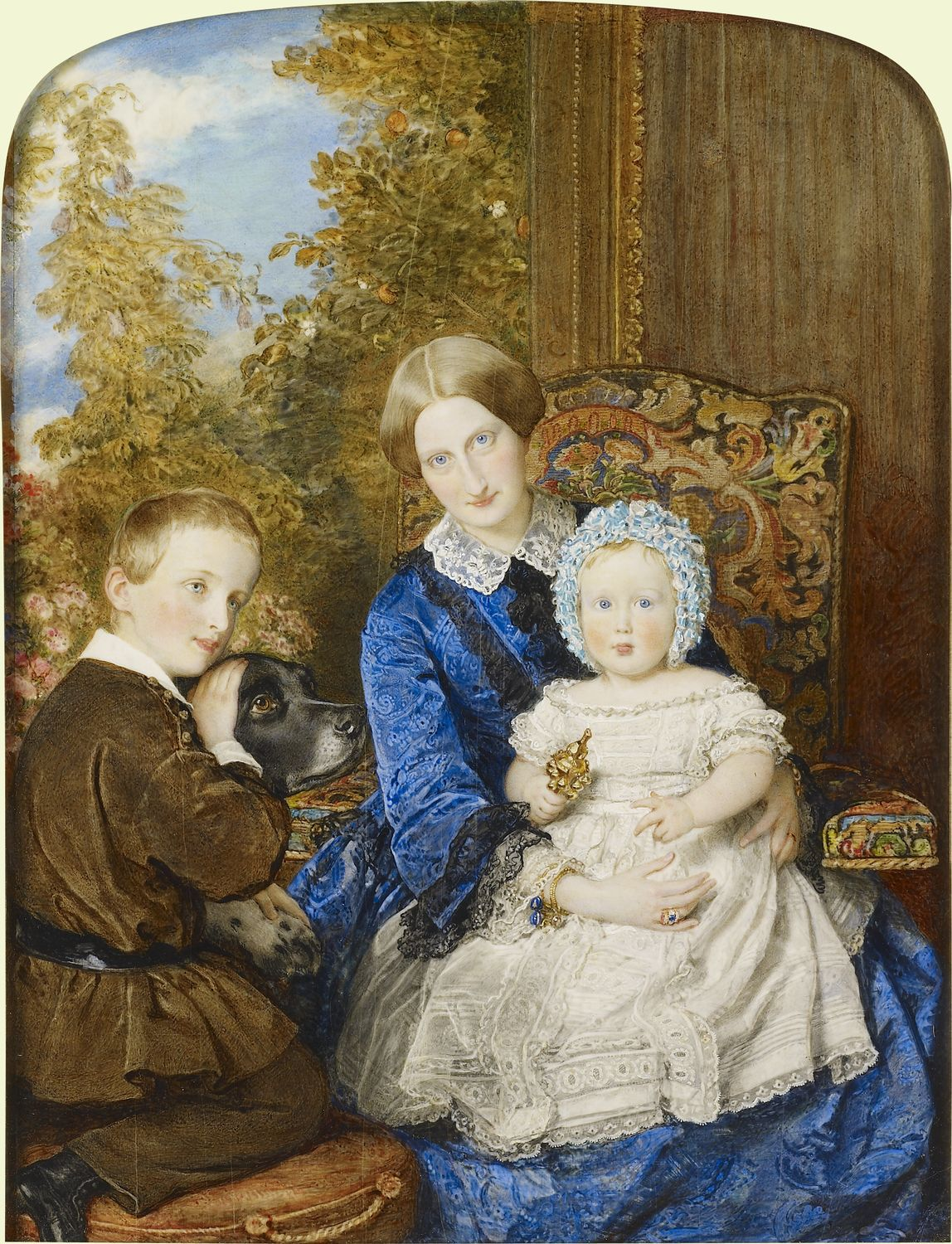
Maria Carolina and her two sons around 1855, by William Charles Ross

After the February Revolution of 1848 the Orléans family went into exile in England and were, by decree from 16 May 1848, permanently banned from France. Maria Carolina followed her husband, and they temporarily moved to Claremont House. Their strained finances forced the Princess to sell parts of their precious jewels to pay for their maintenance.

Maria Carolina soon become a close friend of Queen Victoria, who gave her and her family the Orleans House in Twickenham, London, as their residence. They moved from Claremont to their new home on 16 April 1852. A year earlier, she traveled to Naples with her husband to visit her recently widowed mother and remained there for almost a whole year. While there, she gave birth to her fourth child, named François Paul in January 1852, who unfortunately died at the age of 3 months due to catching whooping cough 'on the way & dies 10 days after their arrival at Claremont.' as Queen Victoria sadly wrote in her journal. Possibly as a result of her parents and her husband's genetic closeness, is likely the main reason for the demise of all her siblings and most of her children. After a long journey in August 1864 across Europe (including Belgium, Germany, Austria, Hungary, Spain, Switzerland and the Orient), Maria Carolina preferably spent her time in the Wood Norton Hall estate at Worcestershire.

The unexpected death of her eldest son Louis Philippe, Prince of Condé, in 1866 plunged Maria Carolina into a deep depression from which she never fully recovered. After a six-week bout of illness, she died on 6 December 1869 aged 47 at Orleans House from infectious tuberculosis.

Queen Victoria wrote of her friend's death: "Deeply grieved, for I loved her much, & since dear Victoria's death, she was the one of the family I clung most to. Dear, kind little soul, I can hardly believe I shall never see her again! It is dreadful for poor Aumale & her poor old mother, also her poor little boy."

Four days after her death, on 10 December 1869, Maria Carolina was buried in the Catholic Chapel of Weybridge until 1876, when her remains were returned to France by her husband to be buried in the Chapelle royale de Dreux. After the death of his wife, Henry preferred to remain a widower until his own death in 1897.

== Children ==
Children of Maria Carolina Augusta

Name	Portrait	Lifespan	Notes
Louis Philippe Marie Léopold d'Orléans; Prince of Condé		15 November 1845 – 24 May 1866	Died at age 20 without issue.
Henri Léopold Philippe Marie d'Orléans; Duke of Guise		11 September 1847 – 10 October 1847	Died in infancy.
Daughter		16 August 1850	Stillborn
François Paul d'Orléans; Duke of Guise		11 January 1852 – 15 April 1852	Died in infancy.
François Louis; Duke of Guise		11 January 1854 – 25 July 1872	Died at age 18 without issue.
Son		May 1857	Stillborn
Son		15 May 1861	Stillborn
Son		June 1864	Stillborn

== Ancestry ==
Ancestors of Princess Maria Carolina of the Two Sicilies (born 1822)

8. Charles III of Spain
4. Ferdinand I of the Two Sicilies (= 14)
9. Princess Maria Amalia of Saxony
2. Leopold, Prince of Salerno
10. Francis I, Holy Roman Emperor
5. Archduchess Maria Carolina of Austria (= 15)
11. Maria Theresa of Austria
1. Princess Maria Carolina of the Two Sicilies
12. Leopold II, Holy Roman Emperor
6. Francis II, Holy Roman Emperor
13. Infanta Maria Luisa of Spain
3. Archduchess Clementina of Austria
14. Ferdinand I of the Two Sicilies (= 4)
7. Princess Maria Theresa of Naples and Sicily
15. Archduchess Maria Carolina of Austria (= 5)

== Bibliography ==
- Raymond Cazelles: Le duc d’Aumale. Prince aus dix visages. Tallandier, Paris 1984, ISBN 2-235-01603-0, pp. 98–115, 279–282.
- Alfred-Auguste de Cuvillier-Fleury: Marie-Caroline Auguste de Bourbon, duchesse d’Aumale, 1822–1869. C. Lahure, Paris 1870. online
- Eric Woerth: Le duc d’Aumale. L'étonnant destin d’un prince collectionneur. L’Archipel, Paris 2006, ISBN 2-84187-839-2, pp. 65–82.
