= Leopold, Prince of Salerno =

Leopold
- Prince of Salerno
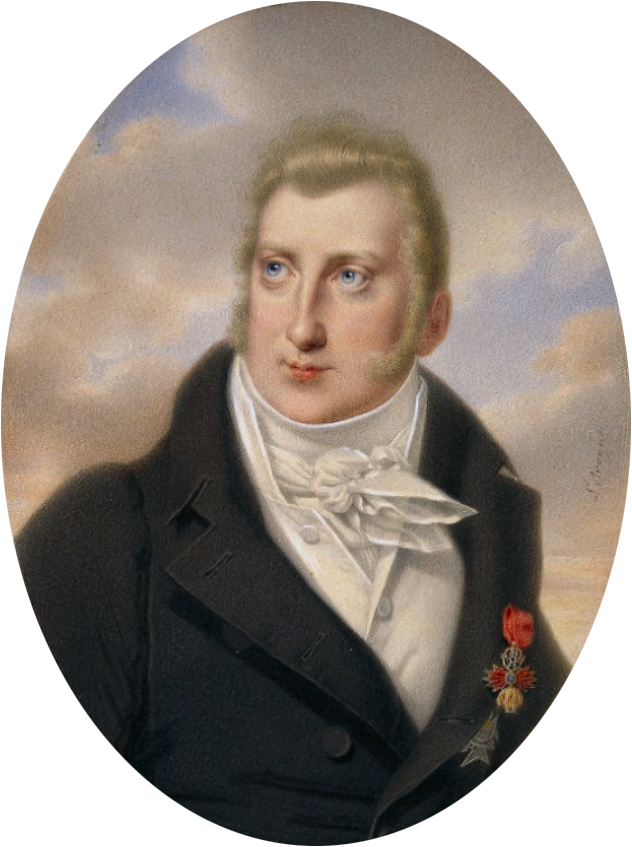
- Portrait by Louis Rene Letronne, 1816
- Born: 2 July 1790; Naples, Kingdom of Naples
- Died: 10 March 1851 (aged 60); Naples, Kingdom of the Two Sicilies
- Burial: Basilica of Santa Chiara, Naples
- Spouse: Archduchess Clementina of Austria (m. 1816)
- Issue: Maria Carolina, Duchess of Aumale
Names
- Italian: Leopoldo Giovanni Giuseppe Michele
- House: Bourbon-Two Sicilies
- Father: Ferdinand I of the Two Sicilies
- Mother: Maria Carolina of Austria

Leopoldo Giovanni Giuseppe Michele of Bourbon-Two Sicilies, Prince of Salerno (2 July 1790 – 10 March 1851) was a member of the House of Bourbon-Two Sicilies and a Prince of Bourbon-Two Sicilies. He married Archduchess Clementina of Austria in 1816, and became the Prince of Salerno.

== Biography ==
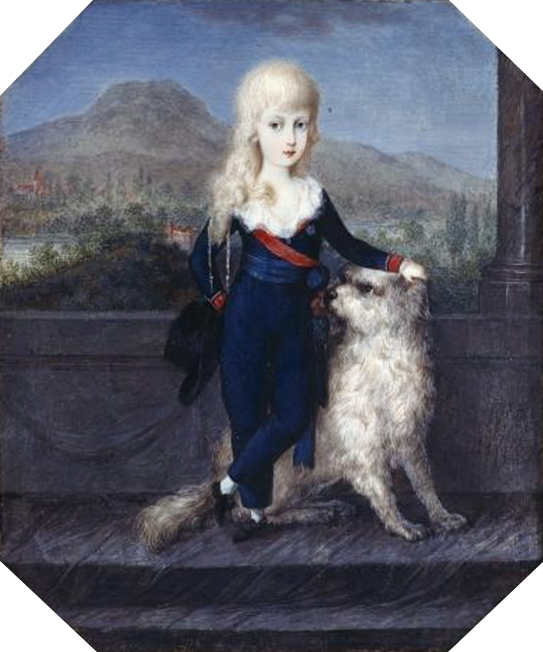
Portrait miniature of Leopold as a child (by Peter Edward Stroehling, 1793–1794).

Born Leopoldo of Naples and Sicily, he was the sixth son of Ferdinand IV of Naples and Maria Carolina of Austria, daughter of Maria Theresa of Austria.

=== Marriage and issue ===
Leopold married his niece and double-first cousin once removed Archduchess Clementina of Austria, third surviving daughter of Francis II, Holy Roman Emperor (later Francis I of Austria) and his sister Maria Teresa of Naples and Sicily, on 28 July 1816 at Schönbrunn Palace in Vienna. They had four children but only their daughter Princess Maria Carolina survived infancy. Prince Louis and two infants died within their first year.

- Stillborn daughter* (16 September 1819)
- Princess Maria Carolina (26 April 1822 – 6 December 1869); married, on 25 November 1844, Prince Henri, Duke of Aumale. Had issue.
- Prince Lodovico Carlos (19 July – 7 August 1824) died in infancy.
- Stillborn daughter* (5 February 1829)

Leopold also had an extramarital affair with the Viennese dancer Fanny Elssler, which led to the birth of an illegitimate son, Franz, born in 1827 and died by suicide in 1873.

=== Death ===
Leopold died at the age of 60 on 10 March 1851 in Naples. His wife, Clementina, died 30 years later at the age of 83.

== Honours ==
- Knight of the Order of Saint Januarius (1790)
- Knight Grand Cross of Justice of the Sacred Military Constantinian Order of Saint George (1797)
- Knight of the Spanish Order of the Golden Fleece (1802)
- Knight of the Orders of the King of France (1810)
- Knight of the Order of Saint Ferdinand and of Merit
- Knight of the Royal and Distinguished Spanish Order of Charles III
- Knight of the Order of Saint George and Reunion
- Knight of the Order of the Most Holy Annunciation (1822)

== Ancestry ==
Ancestors of Leopold, Prince of Salerno

8. Philip V of Spain
4. Charles III of Spain
9. Elisabeth Farnese
2. Ferdinand I of the Two Sicilies
10. Augustus III of Poland
5. Maria Amalia of Saxony
11. Maria Josepha of Austria
1. Leopold, Prince of Salerno
12. Leopold, Duke of Lorraine
6. Francis I, Holy Roman Emperor
13. Élisabeth Charlotte of Orléans
3. Maria Carolina of Austria
14. Charles VI, Holy Roman Emperor
7. Maria Theresa of Austria
15. Elisabeth Christine of Brunswick
