= Archduchess Clementina of Austria =

- Princess of Salerno
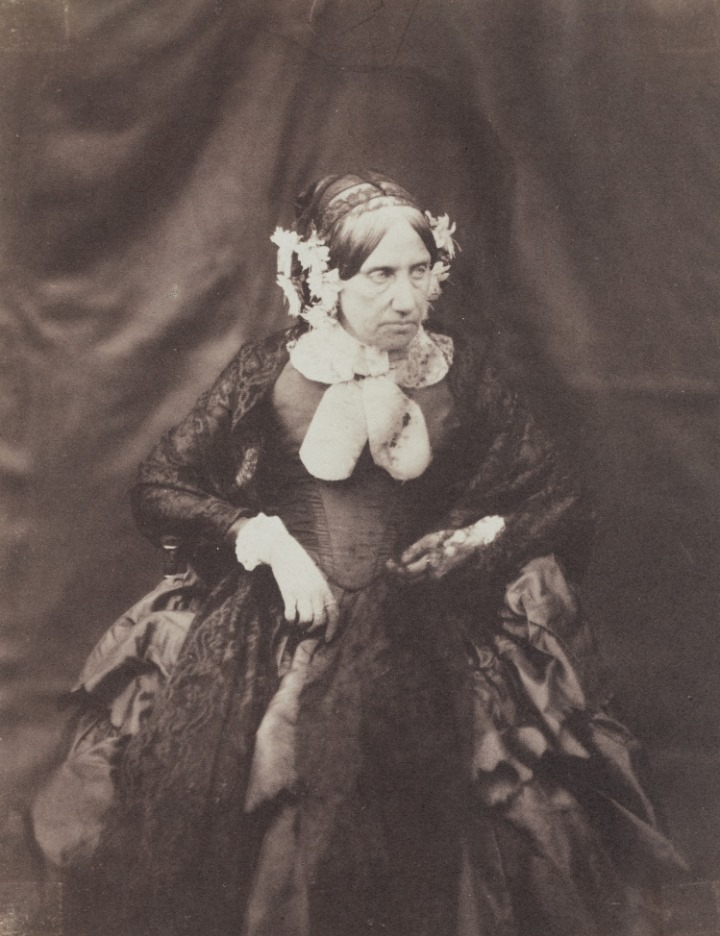
- Clementina c. 1870s
- Born: 1 March 1798; Hofburg Palace, Vienna, Archduchy of Austria
- Died: 3 September 1881 (aged 83); Château de Chantilly, Chantilly, French Third Republic
- Burial: 6 September 1881; Chapelle royale de Dreux
- Spouse: Leopold, Prince of Salerno (m. 1816; died 1851)
- Issue Detail: Maria Carolina, Duchess of Aumale; Prince Ludovico
Names
- German: Maria Klementina Franziska Josepha; Italian: Maria Clementina Francesca Giuseppa
- House: Habsburg-Lorraine
- Father: Francis II, Holy Roman Emperor
- Mother: Maria Theresa of Naples and Sicily

Archduchess Maria Clementina Franziska Josepha of Austria (1 March 1798 – 3 September 1881) was Princess of Salerno by marriage to the Sicilian prince Leopold, Prince of Salerno. She was born an archduchess of Austria as the daughter of Francis II, Holy Roman Emperor, and Maria Theresa of Naples and Sicily.

== Biography ==
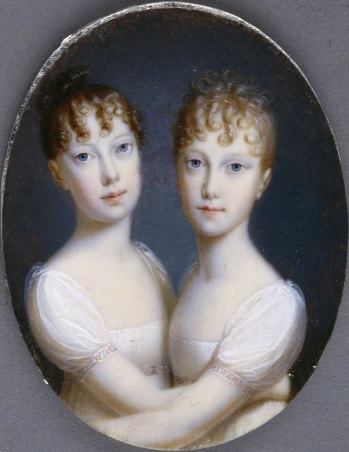
Portrait of Clementina with her elder sister Maria Leopoldina (by Bernhard von Guérard, 1810)

=== Early life ===
Born at the Hofburg Palace in Vienna on 1 March 1798, Clementina was the third surviving daughter of Francis II, Holy Roman Emperor, later Emperor Francis I of Austria after the dissolution of the Holy Roman Empire, and his wife Maria Theresa of Naples and Sicily.

Maria Clementina was a younger sister of Marie Louise, Empress of the French, Emperor Ferdinand I of Austria, and Maria Leopoldina, Empress of Brazil. She was also an older sister of Marie Caroline, Crown Princess of Saxony, Archduke Franz Karl of Austria, and Archduchess Maria Anna of Austria.

=== Marriage ===
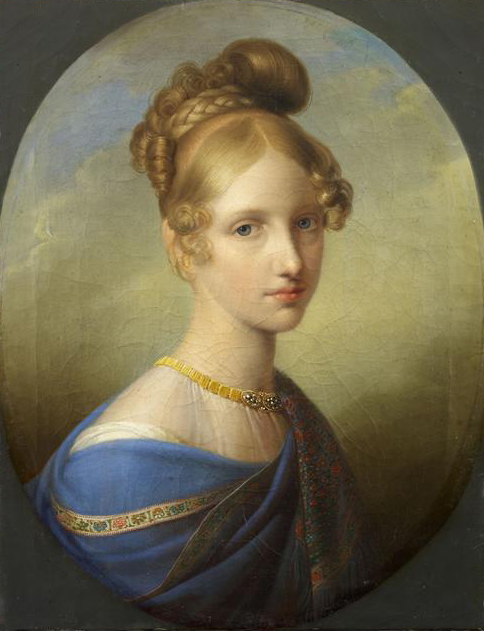
Portrait of Clementina in the year of her marriage (by Johann Peter Krafft, 1816)

Maria Clementina married her mother's younger brother, and double-first cousin once removed, Prince Leopoldo of the Two Sicilies, Prince of Salerno, on 28 July 1816 at the Schönbrunn Palace in Vienna. He was the youngest son of King Ferdinand I of the Two Sicilies and Archduchess Maria Carolina of Austria.

From their four children, only a daughter survived to adulthood, Princess Maria Carolina of the Two Sicilies, who on 25 November 1844, in Naples, married her paternal first cousin Prince Henri, Duke of Aumale. Henri was the fourth (and second-youngest) surviving son of King Louis-Philippe of France and his wife Princess Maria Amalia of Naples and Sicily. Henri and Maria Clementina were also first cousins as both of their mothers were sisters.

Through their daughter, Clementina and Leopoldo had seven grandchildren, two of whom reached adulthood. However, neither of these grandchildren married or produced children of their own.

=== Death ===
Maria Clementina died on 3 September 1881 at the Château de Chantilly in France, the residence of her widowed son-in-law, Duke Henri. She was eighty-three years old, having outlived all her descendants. Maria Clementina was buried in the Royal Chapel at Dreux, France.

== Issue and family ==
- Stillborn daughter* (16 September 1819)
- Princess Maria Carolina Augusta of the Two Sicilies (26 April 1822 – 6 December 1869); married Prince Henri, Duke of Aumale, and had issue.
- Prince Lodovico Carlo of the Two Sicilies (19 July 1824 – 7 August 1824); died in infancy.
- Stillborn daughter* (5 February 1829)

== Honours ==
- Austria-Hungary : Dame of the Order of the Starry Cross.
- Spain : Dame of the Order of Queen Maria Luisa.

== Ancestry ==
Ancestors of Archduchess Clementina of Austria

8. Francis I, Holy Roman Emperor (= 14)
4. Leopold II, Holy Roman Emperor
9. Maria Theresa of Austria (= 15)
2. Francis II, Holy Roman Emperor
10. Charles III of Spain (= 12)
5. Maria Louisa of Spain
11. Maria Amalia of Saxony (= 13)
1. Archduchess Clementina of Austria
12. Charles III of Spain (= 10)
6. Ferdinand I of the Two Sicilies
13. Maria Amalia of Saxony (= 11)
3. Maria Theresa of Naples and Sicily
14. Francis I, Holy Roman Emperor (= 8)
7. Maria Carolina of Austria
15. Maria Theresa of Austria (= 9)
