= Maria Amalia of Naples and Sicily =

Queen of the French from 1830 to 1848

- Duchess of Orléans
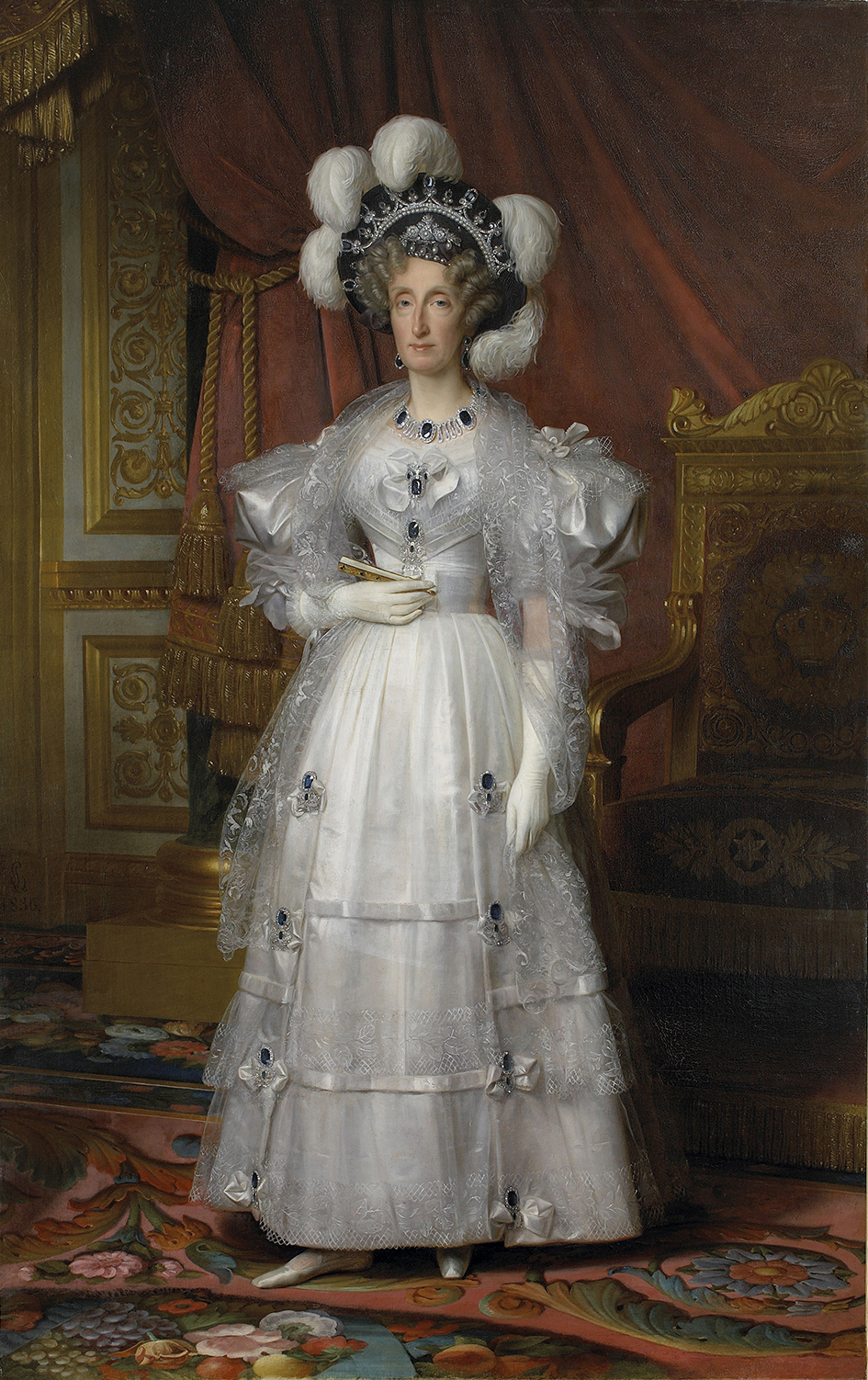
- Portrait by Louis Hersent, c. 1836

Queen consort of the French
- Tenure: 9 August 1830 – 24 February 1848
- Born: 26 April 1782; Caserta Palace, Naples
- Died: 24 March 1866 (aged 83); Claremont House, Surrey, England
- Burial: Royal Chapel, Dreux, France
- Spouse: Louis Philippe I, King of the French (m. 1809; died 1850)
- Issue: Ferdinand Philippe, Duke of Orléans; Louise, Queen of the Belgians; Marie, Duchess of Württemberg; Prince Louis, Duke of Nemours; Princess Françoise; Clémentine, Princess of Saxe-Coburg and Gotha; François, Prince of Joinville; Prince Charles, Duke of Penthièvre; Prince Henri, Duke of Aumale; Prince Antoine, Duke of Montpensier
Names
- Italian: Maria Amalia Teresa di Borbone; French: Marie-Amélie Thérèse de Bourbon-Siciles
- House: Bourbon-Two Sicilies
- Father: Ferdinand I of the Two Sicilies
- Mother: Maria Carolina of Austria

Maria Amalia of Naples and Sicily (Maria Amalia Teresa; 26 April 1782 – 24 March 1866) was Queen of the French by marriage to Louis Philippe I, King of the French. She was the last Queen of the French.

Among her grandchildren were the monarchs Leopold II of Belgium, Empress Carlota of Mexico, with whom Maria Amalia regularly corresponded while she was in Mexico, Ferdinand I of Bulgaria, and Queen Mercedes of Spain.

== Early years ==
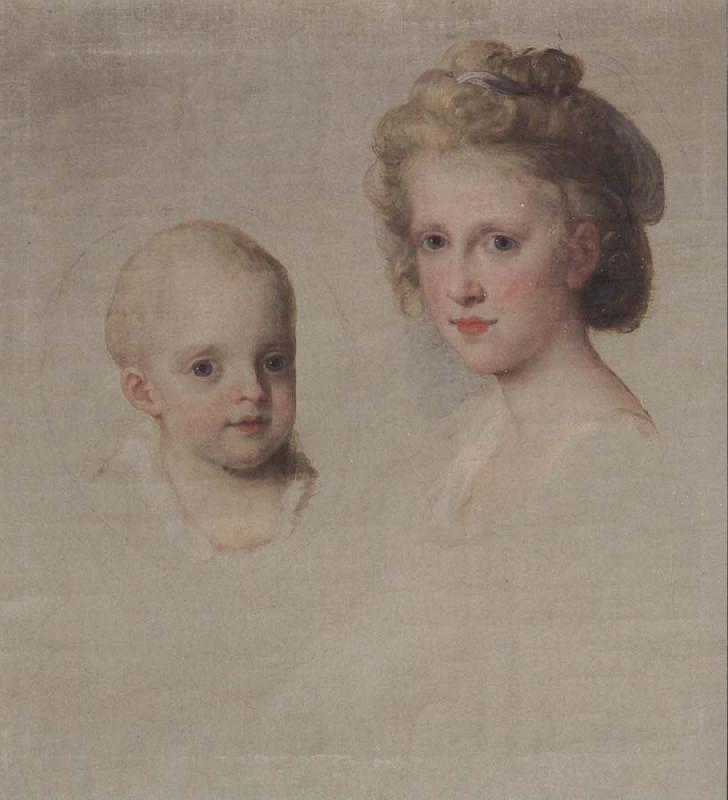
Maria Amalia (left) with her older sister Maria Luisa, by Angelica Kauffmann, 1782.

Maria Amalia was born on 26 April 1782 at the Caserta Palace just outside Naples. She was the tenth of eighteen children of Ferdinand I of the Two Sicilies and Maria Carolina of Austria.

As a young Italian princess, she was educated in the Catholic tradition, which she appears to have taken to heart. Maria Carolina, like her mother, Maria Theresa, made an effort to be a part of her daughter's life, though she was cared for daily by her governess, Vincenza Rizzi. As a child, Maria Amalia's mother and her aunt, Marie Antoinette, arranged for her engagement to Marie Antoinette's son, Louis Joseph, Dauphin of France, her cousin, the future king of France. Her young fiancé died in 1789.

Maria Amalia faced chaos and upheaval from a young age. The death of her aunt Marie Antoinette during the French Revolution and her mother's subsequent dramatic actions emblazoned the event in her memory. During the outbreak of the French Revolution in 1789, the Neapolitan court was not hostile to the movement. When the French monarchy was abolished and her aunt Marie Antoinette and uncle Louis XVI were executed, Maria Amalia's parents joined the First Coalition against France in 1793. Although peace was made with France in 1796, by 1798 conflict again erupted and the royal family fled to the Kingdom of Sicily, leaving Naples on 21 December 1798 aboard HMS Vanguard, a British Royal Navy vessel protected by two Neapolitan warships. Maria Amalia spent the years 1800 to 1802 with her mother in Austria. In 1802, she finally returned to Naples with her mother. After the invasion of Naples by Napoleon in 1806, the royal family was once more forced to flee to Sicily, where they again settled in Palermo under the protection of British troops.

While in exile, Maria Amalia encountered her future husband, Louis Philippe d'Orléans, also forced from his home in France due to political complications of the French Revolution and the rise of Napoleon. Louis-Philippe's father, the previous Duke of Orléans, had been guillotined during the French Revolution, though he had advocated it in the early years.

The two were married in 1809, three years after they met in Italy, whereupon Marie-Amelie became Duchess of Orléans. The ceremony was celebrated in Palermo 25 November 1809. The marriage was considered controversial, because she was the niece of Marie Antoinette, while he was the son of a man who was considered to have played a part in the execution of her aunt. Her mother was skeptical of the match for the same reason, but she had given her consent after he had convinced her that he was determined to compensate for the mistakes of his father, and after having agreed to answer all her questions regarding his father.

== Duchess of Orléans ==
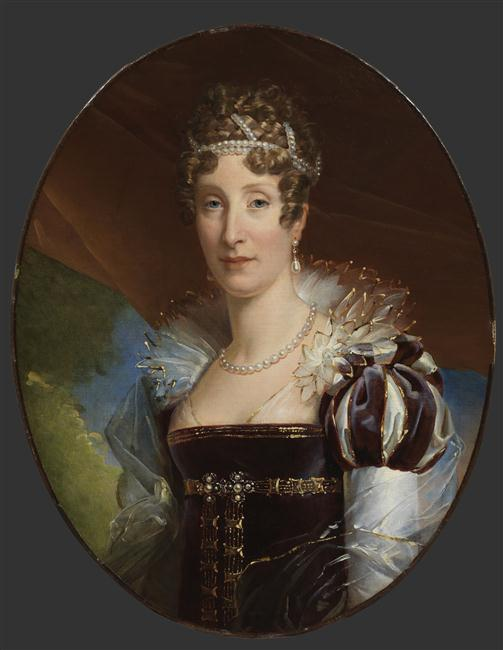
Maria Amalia, by François Gérard, 1819

During the first years of her marriage, Marie-Amelie and Louis Philippe lived under British protection in Palermo, in a palace given to them by her father, the Palazzo Orléans.

Marie-Amelie went to France with her new husband in 1814, where she attempted to make a home with her growing family, but with Napoleon's brief return, she was forced to flee yet again. Prior to her husband's rise to power, Marie-Amelie and her husband had to cope with a persistent money problem due to the fact that they had no income aside from that which they were given by the British crown. The family was given permission to return to France again in 1817.

During the Orléans' time in France prior to Louis-Philippe's accession, the family lived in the Palais-Royal, which had been the home of her father-in-law, Louis Philippe II, Duke of Orléans. Despite the monetary worries of the family, the house was returned to its original splendor at a cost to the couple of eleven million francs. During their tenure as Duke and Duchess of Orléans, her spouse made Palais-Royal a center of high society in Paris when the aristocracy found the royal court, which was organized according to revived l'ancien regime-etiquette, too stiff. However, it was rather her sister-in-law Madame Adelaide who was regarded the hostess at Palais-Royal, while Marie-Amelie was described as dignified but silent and withdrawn. In 1825, the Duke and Duchess met with her sister and brother-in-law, the King and Queen of Sardinia in Chambéry, and in May 1830, they hosted her brother and sister-in-law, the King and Queen of the Two Sicilies, at Palais-Royal.

== Queen of the French ==
=== July revolution ===
In 1830, following what is known as the July Revolution, Louis-Philippe became king of the French, with Maria Amalia as queen of the July Monarchy. Maria Amalia did not approve of Louis-Philippe's acceptance of the crown and reportedly described it as a catastrophe.

When tumult followed the publication of the Ordinances in 1830 and erupted in the July revolution in Paris, the Orléans family was at the country estate Neuilly. Her sister in-law, Adélaïde, convinced Louis-Philippe that the moment was right for him to place himself as the leader of the opposition against the absolute monarchy of Charles X, and present himself as the candidate of a constitutional monarchy, in between the unpopular absolute monarchy and the republicanism. In this, she defeated the view of her sister in-law, Maria Amalia, who was loyal to the reigning older branch. When rumors arrived that the royalists were going to arrest Louis-Philippe, he evacuated to Raincy and the children were sent to Villers-Cotterêts, but Adélaïde and Maria Amalia remained at Neuilly.

When a delegation reached Neuilly and offered Louis-Philippe the crown, Maria Amalia refused the offer on behalf of herself and her spouse, reproaching Ary Scheffer and Adolphe Thiers for insulting them by having made it. Adélaïde, however, accepted it with the argument that her brother would do anything to prevent the country he loved from anarchy. Thiers accepted the answer of Adélaïde rather than the one from Maria Amalia with the words: "Madame, you have given the crown to your family". After this, several other visits followed from people asking Louis-Philippe to accept the crown: to all, Maria Amalia answered that Louis-Philippe was an honest man and thus could not do it, while Adélaïde contradicted her by stating, that the offer should be made to Louis-Philippe by the chamber of deputies; and if he should hesitate, she would herself go to Paris and accept the crown for him. Soon after, the Chamber of Deputies called Louis-Philippe to Paris to formally present him their offer. It has been estimated that he accepted the crown largely because of Adélaïde.

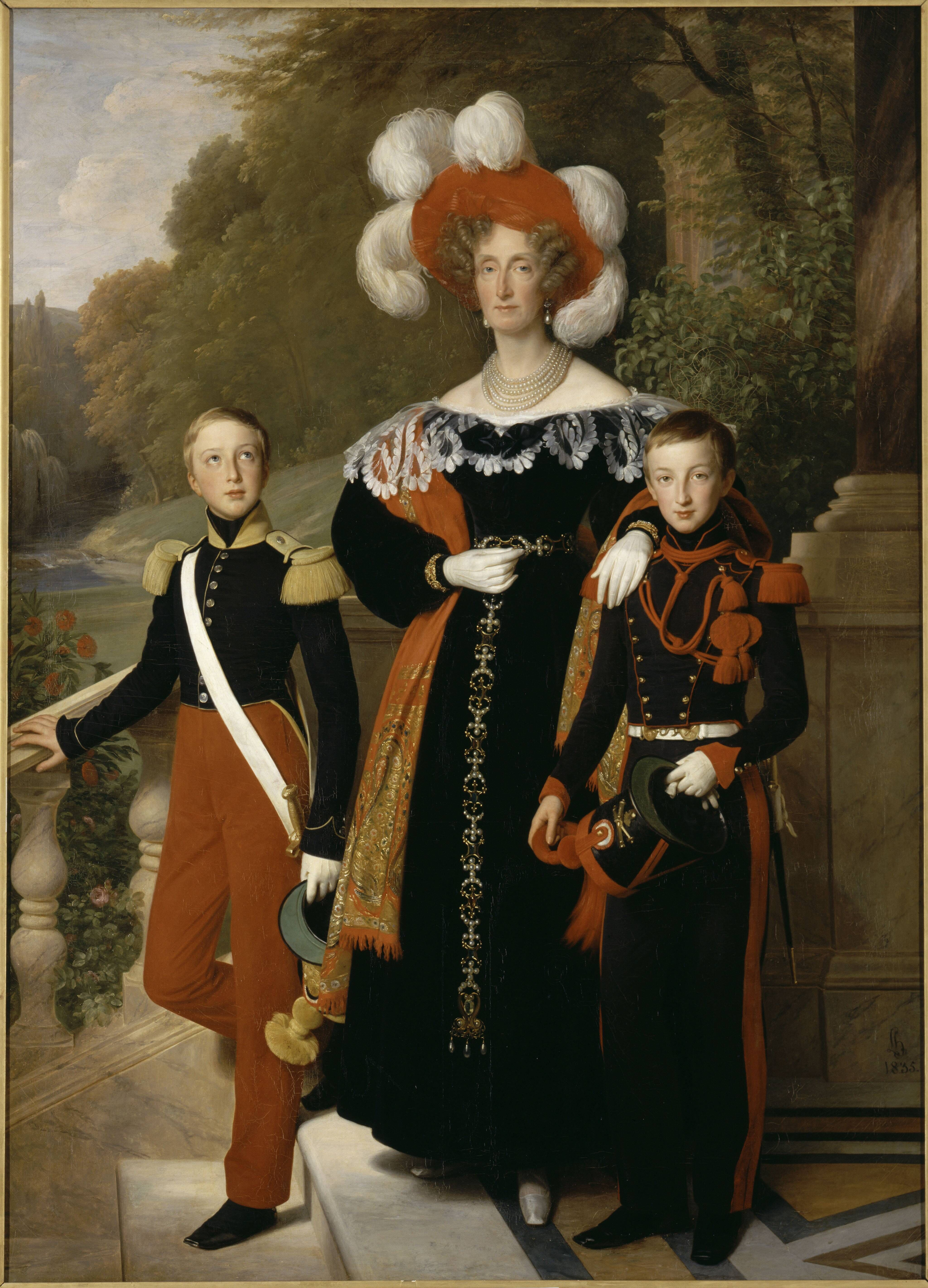
Portrait of Maria Amalia of Naples and Sicily, by Louis Hersent (c. 1835).

When the news arrived that Louis-Philippe had accepted the crown, Maria Amalia reportedly cried and sobbed: "What a catastrophe! They will call my husband an usurper!" She refused to return to Paris with her children in an open state carriage, as this would give an impression of triumph. When she did arrive to the Palais-Royal, which was at that time wide open to the public, it was noticed that she looked as if she had been crying, which attracted attention. She and her sister-in-law visited those who had been wounded during the revolution, and supported them financially.

Maria Amalia was to say that she could see no advantages of the crown, only the destruction of a peaceful family life and an insecurity for the lives of her family. However, she concluded, as God has given them the crown, they must do the best of the matter: "Since by God's will this Crown of Thorns has been placed upon our heads, we must accept it and the duties it entails". At 6 August 1830, she and her sister-in-law were present at the tribune on the ceremony at the chambers when Louis-Philippe were declared King of the French. She herself was never honored with any form of official ceremony, though she was automatically given the honorary title Queen of the French.

=== Official role ===
Maria Amalia did not play an active role in politics and in fact made a concentrated effort to remove herself from it. In 1832, after the failed coup of Marie-Caroline de Bourbon-Sicile, duchess de Berry, Marie-Caroline appealed to her from her prison at Blaye, as did one of Marie-Caroline's followers, Mesnard; however Maria Amalia refused to even receive the petition of the first nor to promise anything to the second, despite being personally attached to the Duchess de Berry. It was with his sister rather than with his wife that the King discussed state affairs.

Arms of Marie Amélie as queen consort of the French

As Queen, Maria Amalia became foremost known for her simple personal life style and her charity. For political reasons, King Louis-Philippe did not wish to have any representation or court life of the more elaborate kind but, rather wished to give the impression of his family living a life of the burgher class, and during her tenure as Queen, the royal court was relatively subdued to its outward appearance. The court etiquette at the Tuileries was therefore simplified, and the royal family lived a life which was to be modeled after the ideal life of a wealthy burgher class family of the time, with few state occasions, though they did regularly host smaller gala dinners for the representatives of the people. This domestic life did suit Maria Amalia, who was already devoted to this life style. The household included her lady-in-waiting, the Marquise de Dolomieu.

The Queen's daily routine centered around family dinners, religious duties and charitable work: she kept a strict guard over her daughters and later her daughters-in-law, sewing with them in the drawing room when she was not occupied with her charitable work. After having heard Mass and received private audiences, she worked with her secretaries receiving, personally reading and attending to petitions from the poor. As queen she was named Protector of several charity organizations, notably the Société de Charité Maternelle. Maria Amalia received a personal allowance of 500.000 franc, and spent 400.000 franc of that sum on charity. Reportedly, however, she did give contributions to the needing regardless of their political or religious convictions.

In one instance, she responded to a request from French missionary sister Saint Mother Theodore Guerin of the Sisters of Providence of Saint Mary-of-the-Woods by saying, "Ah, yes, sisters, let us save souls!" She gave Guerin and her fellow Sister of Providence Mary Cecilia Bailly funds for their schools in the United States, as well as covered their travel expenses.

She was regarded to have performed her representational duties with dignity. In 1843, she hosted Britain's Queen Victoria at the Château d'Eu in Normandy. She did not, however, follow Louis-Philippe on his visit to England in 1844.

=== Revolution of 1848 ===
While Maria Amalia had accepted the crown unwillingly, she regarded it her duty to keep it after it had once been given to her by God. During the Revolution of 1848, Maria Amalia made an attempt to get Louis-Philippe to take control of the troops, rally the National Guard, subdue the riots on the streets and defend his crown with his life. Reportedly, he did not answer her, but only asked her to trust his judgement. When a mob marched toward the Tuileries, Louis Philippe was convinced by his ministers to flee, and he signed his abdication in favor of his grandson against the consent of Maria Amalia. When the family left the palace, Maria Amalia reportedly turned to minister Thiers and commented: "Ah Monsieur, you were not worthy of such a good king!"

The family left under somewhat chaotic circumstances, and Maria Amalia reportedly fainted and had to be lifted into her carriage. The couple were accompanied by their son Antoine, Duke of Montpensier; their daughter-in-law the Duchess of Nemours; their daughter Princess Clementine and her spouse, as well as six grandchildren. Their eldest son's widow the Duchess of Orléans and her sons were left at the palace in the company of their son the Duke of Nemours to fight for the right to the crown of their grandson, the Count of Paris.

The family left Paris for Saint-Cloud and from there to Dreux, where they parted and made their way to England in different groups. Maria Amalia and Louis Philippe lived for a while in the cottage of a friend in Honfleur, before they left in secret by Le Havre for Newhaven in England.

== Exile and death ==
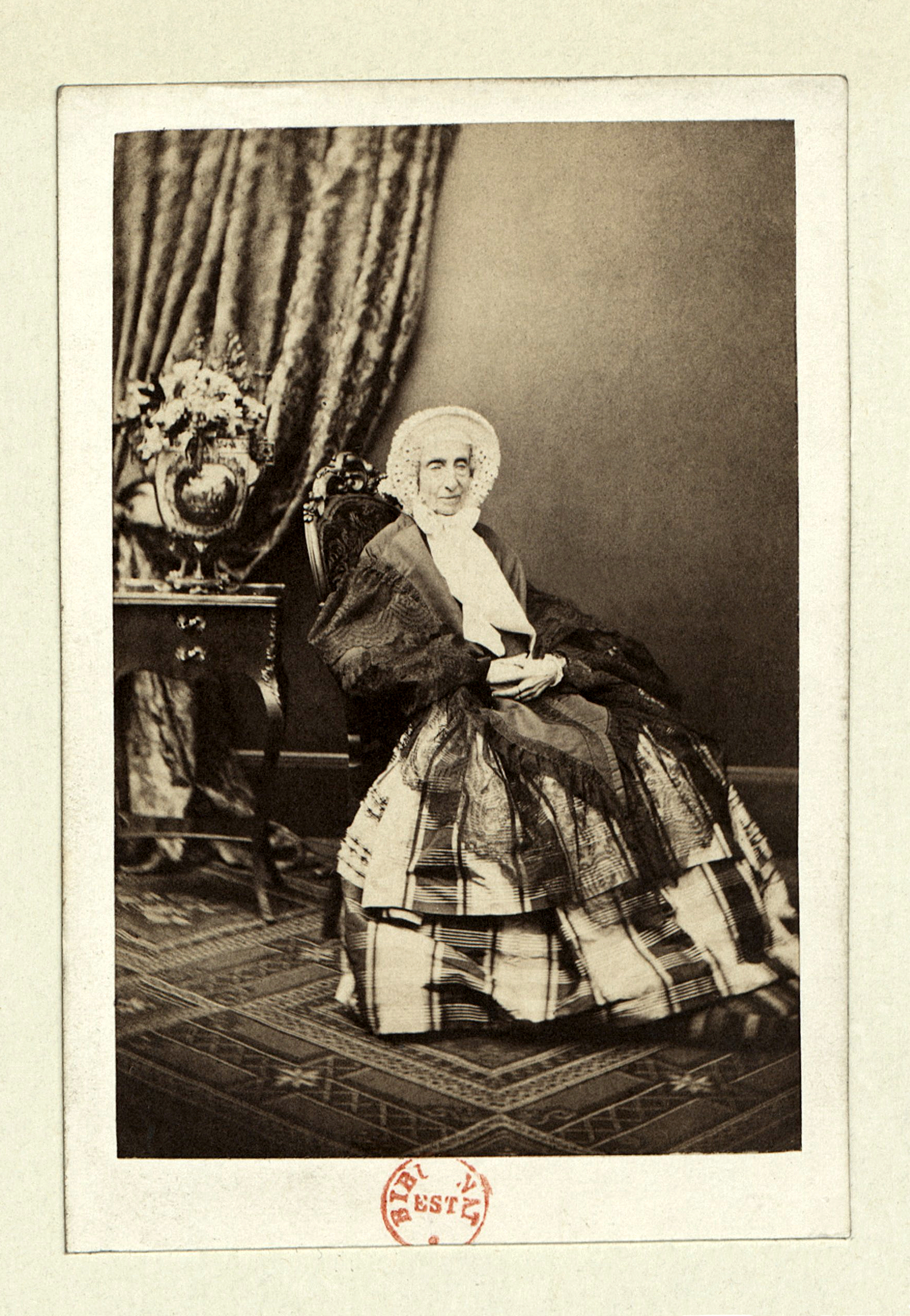
Photograph of Maria Amalia in her old age by Antoine Claudet, c. 1860–66

In England, Louis Philippe and Maria Amalia were well received by Queen Victoria, who let them live in Claremont House in Surrey for life. As the French state had decided not to confiscate their property, they did not have money problems.

Louis Philippe died two years later. After the death of her husband, Maria Amalia continued to live in England where she attended daily Mass and was well known to Queen Victoria. She spent her remaining years living a private family life, and was joined by most of her children with the exception of the Duke of Montpensier. Maria Amalia regarded the elder branch of the Bourbon to have superior right to the French throne, and she supported her son the Duke of Nemours when he reconciled with the head of the elder Bourbon line, Henri, Count of Chambord, on behalf of the Orléans line. At her death, she also asked to be called Duchess of Orléans on her grave stone rather than Queen of the French.

Maria Amalia died on 24 March 1866, aged 83. She was the last surviving grandchild of Empress Maria Theresa of Austria. After her death, the dress she had kept since 1848 when her husband had left France was put on her, according to her last wishes.

== Issue ==
Name	Picture	Birth	Death	Notes
Ferdinand, Duke of Orléans		3 September 1810	13 July 1842	Married Duchess Helene of Mecklenburg-Schwerin, had issue.
Princess Louise d'Orléans		3 April 1812	11 October 1850	Married Leopold I of Belgium, had issue.
Princess Marie d'Orléans		12 April 1813	6 January 1839	Married Duke Alexander of Württemberg, had issue.
Louis, Duke of Nemours		25 October 1814	26 June 1896	Married Princess Victoria of Saxe-Coburg and Gotha, had issue.
Princess Françoise d'Orléans		26 March 1816	20 May 1818	Died aged two. Baptised on 20 July 1816, with Francis I, Emperor of Austria as her godfather.
Princess Clémentine d'Orléans		3 June 1817	16 February 1907	Married Prince August of Saxe-Coburg and Gotha, had issue.
François, Prince of Joinville		14 August 1818	16 June 1900	Married Princess Francisca of Brazil, had issue.
Charles, Duke of Penthièvre		1 January 1820	25 July 1828	Died aged eight.
Henri, Duke of Aumale		16 January 1822	7 May 1897	Married Princess Maria Carolina of Bourbon-Two Sicilies, had issue.
Antoine, Duke of Montpensier		31 July 1824	4 February 1890	Married Infanta Luisa Fernanda, Duchess of Montpensier, had issue.

== Ancestry ==
Ancestors of Maria Amalia of Naples and Sicily

8. Philip V of Spain
4. Charles III of Spain
9. Elisabeth Farnese
2. Ferdinand I of the Two Sicilies
10. Augustus III of Poland
5. Maria Amalia of Saxony
11. Maria Josepha of Austria
1. Marie Amélie of Naples and Sicily
12. Leopold, Duke of Lorraine
6. Francis I, Holy Roman Emperor
13. Élisabeth Charlotte of Orléans
3. Maria Carolina of Austria
14. Charles VI, Holy Roman Emperor
7. Maria Theresa of Austria
15. Elisabeth Christine of Brunswick

== Bibliography ==
- Dyson, C. C. (1910). The life of Marie-Amélie. New York: D. Appleton and Company. OCLC 526786.

Maria Amalia of Naples and Sicily House of Bourbon-Two Sicilies Cadet branch of the House of Bourbon Born: 26 April 1782 Died: 24 March 1866
French royalty
Vacant Title last held by Marie Thérèse of France as Queen of France and of Navarre	Queen consort of the French; 9 August 1830 – 24 February 1848	Vacant Title next held by Eugénie de Montijo as Empress of the French
