= Joseph Francis (disambiguation) =

Joseph Francis (1801–1893) was an American inventor.

Joseph or Joe Francis may also refer to:

- Joseph Abel Francis (1923–1997), American Catholic bishop
- Joseph A. Francis, head football coach for the Middlebury College Panthers football team in 1914
- Joe Francis (born 1973), American entrepreneur and film producer
- Joe Francis (American football) (1936–2013), quarterback for the Green Bay Packers
- Joe Francis (politician) (born 1970), former member of the Western Australian Legislative Assembly
- Joseph Marshall Francis (1862–1939), bishop of Indiana in the Episcopal Church
- Joe Francis (rugby union)
- Joe Francis (speedway rider)

== See also ==
- Francis Joseph (disambiguation)
