= Maria Theresa of Naples and Sicily =

Habsburg empress from 1792 to 1807

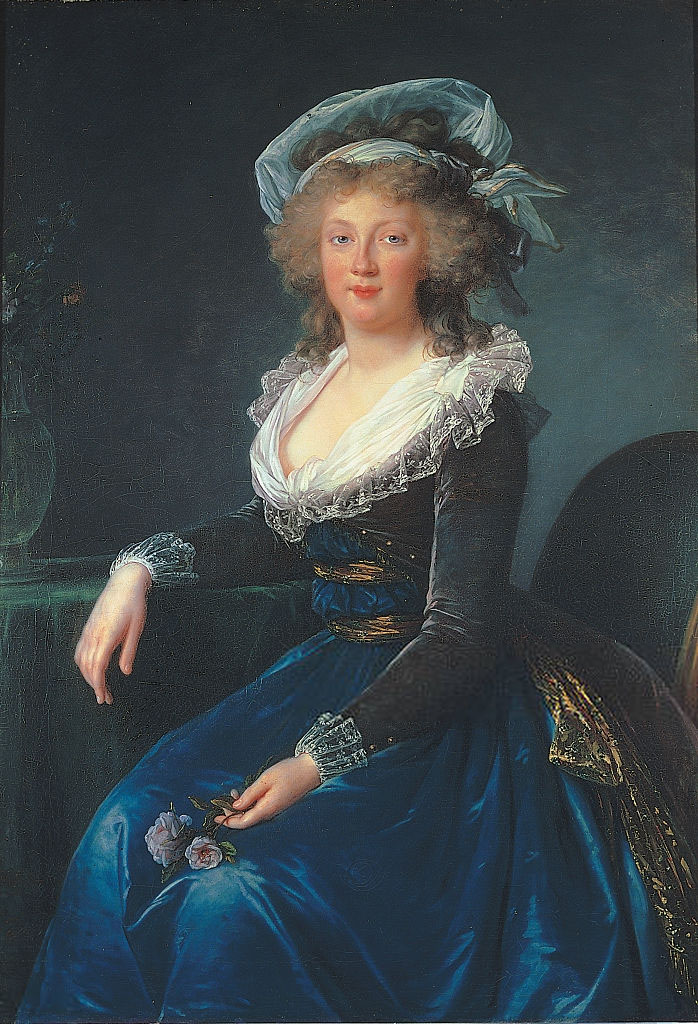
- Portrait by Élisabeth Vigée Le Brun, 1790

Holy Roman Empress
- Tenure: 5 July 1792 – 6 August 1806

Queen consort of Hungary and Bohemia Archduchess consort of Austria
- Tenure: 1 March 1792 - 13 April 1807
- Coronation: 11 August 1793; Prague

Empress consort of Austria
- Tenure: 11 August 1804 – 13 April 1807
- Born: 6 June 1772; Royal Palace, Naples, Kingdom of Naples
- Died: 13 April 1807 (aged 34); Hofburg Palace, Vienna, Austrian Empire
- Burial: Imperial Crypt
- Spouse: Francis II, Holy Roman Emperor (m. 1790)
- Issue Among others..: Marie Louise, Empress of the French; Ferdinand I, Emperor of Austria; Maria Leopoldina, Empress of Brazil and Queen of Portugal; Maria Clementina, Princess of Salerno; Archduke Joseph Franz Leopold; Marie Caroline, Crown Princess of Saxony; Archduke Franz Karl; Archduchess Marie Anne
Names
- Maria Teresa Carolina Giuseppina di Borbone
- House: Bourbon-Two Sicilies
- Father: Ferdinand I of the Two Sicilies
- Mother: Maria Carolina of Austria

Maria Theresa of Naples and Sicily (6 June 1772 – 13 April 1807) was the last Holy Roman Empress and first Empress of Austria as the spouse of Francis II. She was born a Princess of Naples as the eldest daughter of King Ferdinand I of the Two Sicilies and Queen Maria Carolina.

== Biography ==
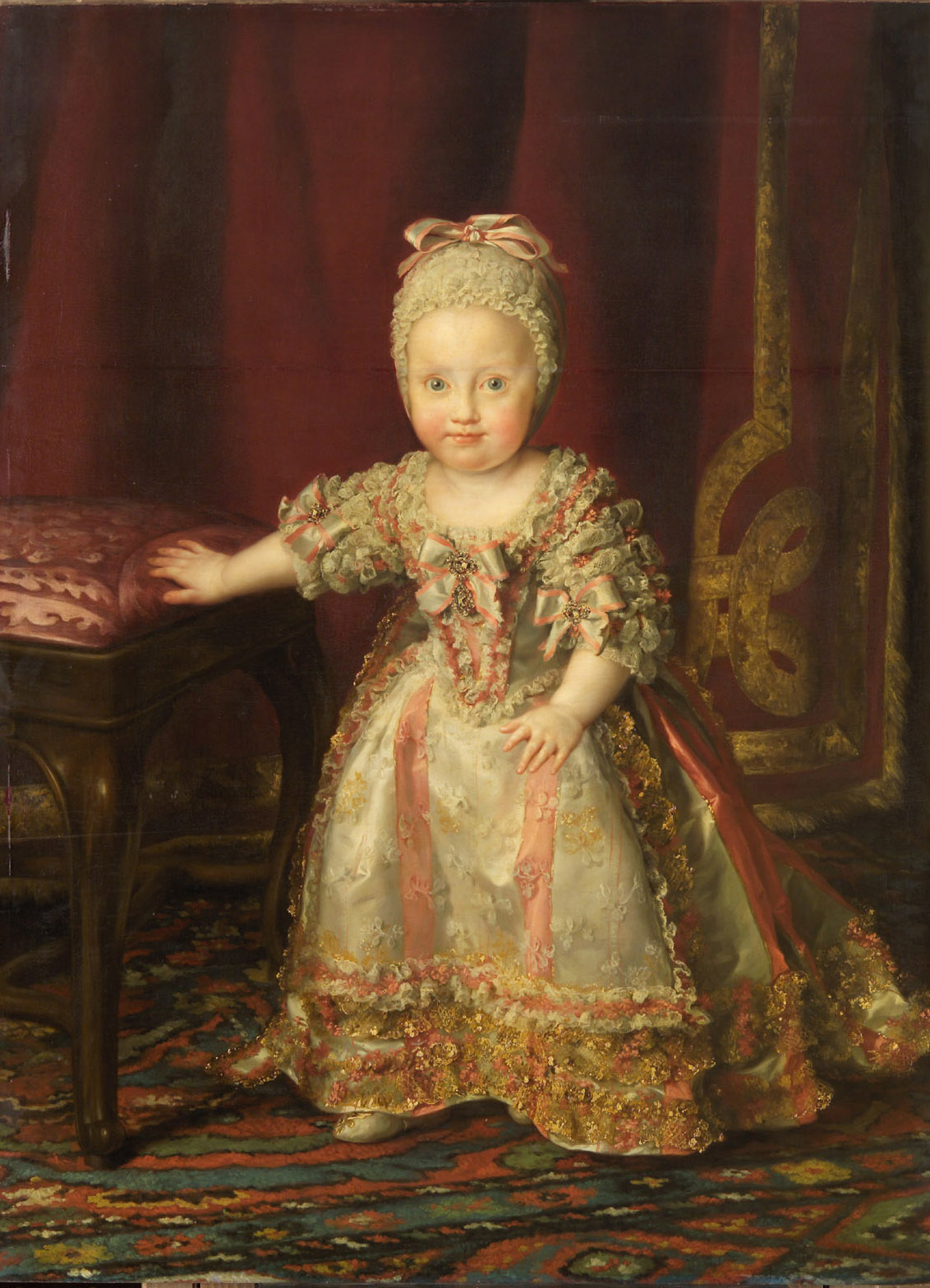
Maria Theresa of Naples as a young child

=== Early life ===
Born on 6 June 1772 at the Royal Palace of Naples, Maria Theresa Carolina Giuseppina was the eldest child of Ferdinand I of the Two Sicilies and his wife Maria Carolina. She was her mother’s favorite child from birth, and was henceforth named after her maternal grandmother Empress Maria Theresa. Princess Maria Theresa was taught French, mathematics, geography, theology, music, dancing, and drawing.

In the February of 1790, Archduke Francis’s wife, Archduchess Elisabeth, died in childbirth, and it was announced that he would marry one of the princesses of Naples. Maria Theresa and her sister Luisa were both considered for the match. In the end, though, Luisa was chosen to marry Ferdinand III, Grand Duke of Tuscany, and Maria Theresa was to marry Francis. The marriage was in accordance with the traditional House of Habsburg marriage policy.

==== Marriage ====
On 15 September 1790, at the age of 18, Princess Maria Theresa married her double first cousin Archduke Francis. Francis would, in 1792, become Holy Roman Emperor. Eventually, in 1804, he would become the first Emperor of Austria. The marriage was described as a happy one based on mutual understanding, despite differences in personality. Francis was described as a melancholic character. He was shy and reserved, and was serious with a preference for a spartan lifestyle and duty. Maria Theresa, on the other hand, was described as a gracious blue-eyed blonde with a vivacious personality, a hot temper and a sensual nature. Despite these differences in personality, they were reported to have a good understanding of each other and had a very good relationship.

Maria Theresa reportedly adapted well to her new home in Vienna and did not suffer from homesickness. She participated with enthusiasm in court life, and it was noted that she enjoyed dancing and partaking in carnival balls—even while pregnant. She particularly enjoyed the Waltz, which had been recently introduced as an innovation and became fashionable during her years in Vienna.

Hedvig Elisabeth Charlotte of Holstein-Gottorp described the view of Maria Theresa and the relationship between the couple in her famous diary during her visit to Vienna in 1798–99:

The Empress is reputed to be so jealous that she does not allow him to take part in social life or meet other women. Vicious tongues accuse her of being so passionate that she exhausts her consort and never leaves him alone even for a moment. Although the people of Vienna cannot deny that she is gifted, charitable and carries herself beautifully, she is disliked for her intolerance and for forcing the Emperor to live isolated from everyone. She is also accused of interesting herself in unimportant matters and socializing exclusively with her lady-companions. With them she spends her evenings singing, acting out comedies and being applauded.

On 12 December 1791, the firstborn child of Princess Maria Theresa and Archduke Francis was born: Marie Louise. She was educated specifically in French, English, Spanish, Italian and Latin, with the expectation of her native language German. Marie Louise would soon marry Emperor Napoleon, in an attempt to end the wars with France that were affecting her parents and grandparents.

=== Holy Roman Empress ===
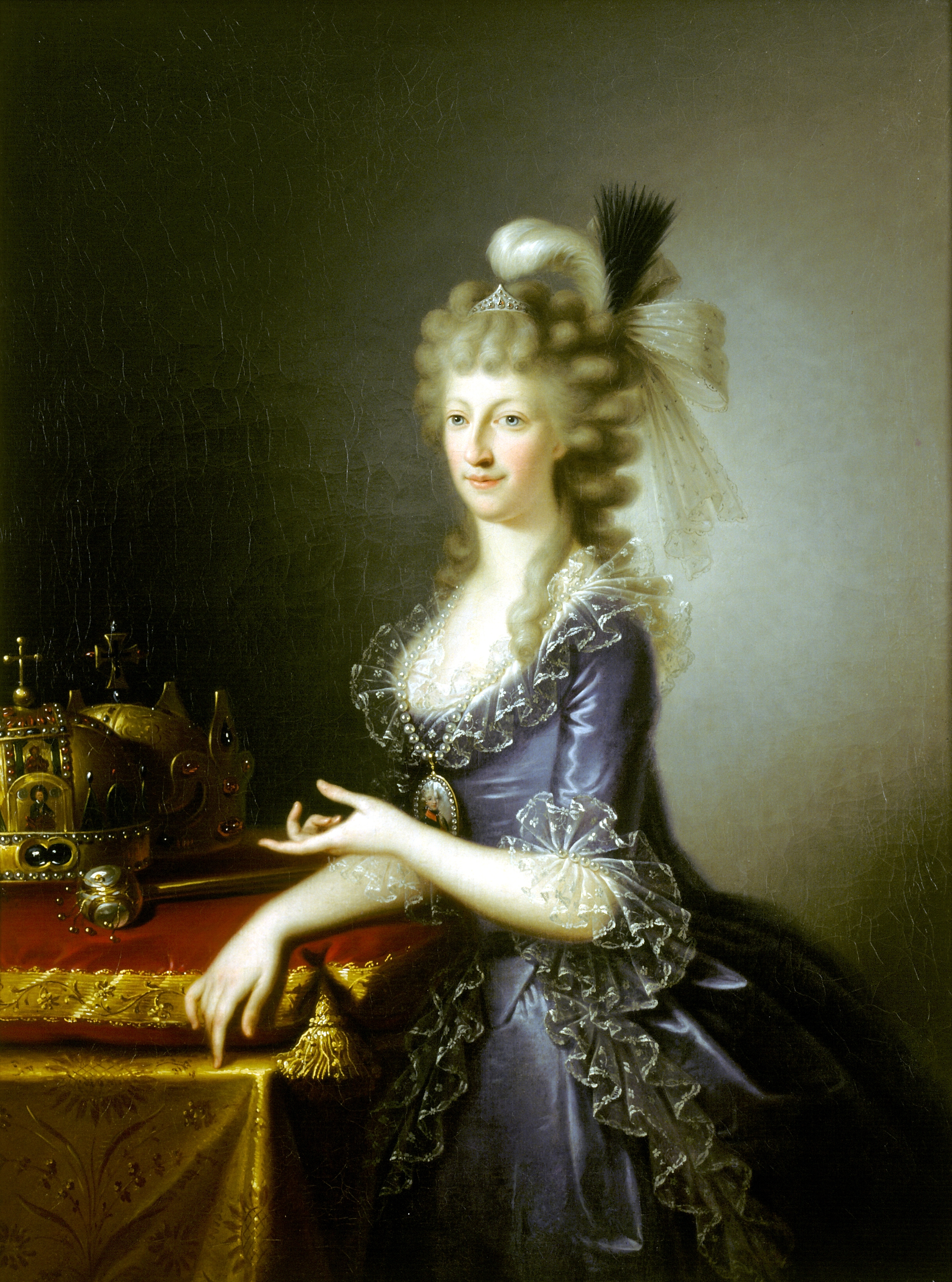
Portrait of Empress Maria Theresa, by Johann Baptist von Lampi the Elder

In 1792, Maria Theresa’s husband Francis ascended the throne as King of Hungary, Croatia and Bohemia, and she became queen consort. In the same year, she would become Holy Roman Empress. The-then Empress Maria Theresa was interested in politics and came to play a certain role in state affairs due to her influence over her spouse, to whom she acted as an adviser. She was a conservative force and belonged to the critics of Napoleon, and was reported to have encouraged Francis in an anti-French position during the Napoleonic Wars. She has also been pointed out for being partially responsible for the dismissal of Johann Baptist Freiherr von Schloissnigg and Graf Franz Colloredo.

In February of 1799, her seeming indifference to the flight of her parents from Naples attracted some disfavour in Vienna. Although she was her mother’s favorite child, she was biased when it came to their exile during the war.

An important patron of Viennese music, she commissioned many compositions for official and private use. Joseph Haydn wrote his Te Deum for chorus and orchestra at her request. Her favourite composers included Paul Wranitzky and Joseph Leopold Eybler, a composer of sacred music. Ludwig van Beethoven dedicated his popular Septet in E flat to her in 1800. He would later arrange the work for a piano trio consisting of a piano, clarinet and cello.

=== Death ===
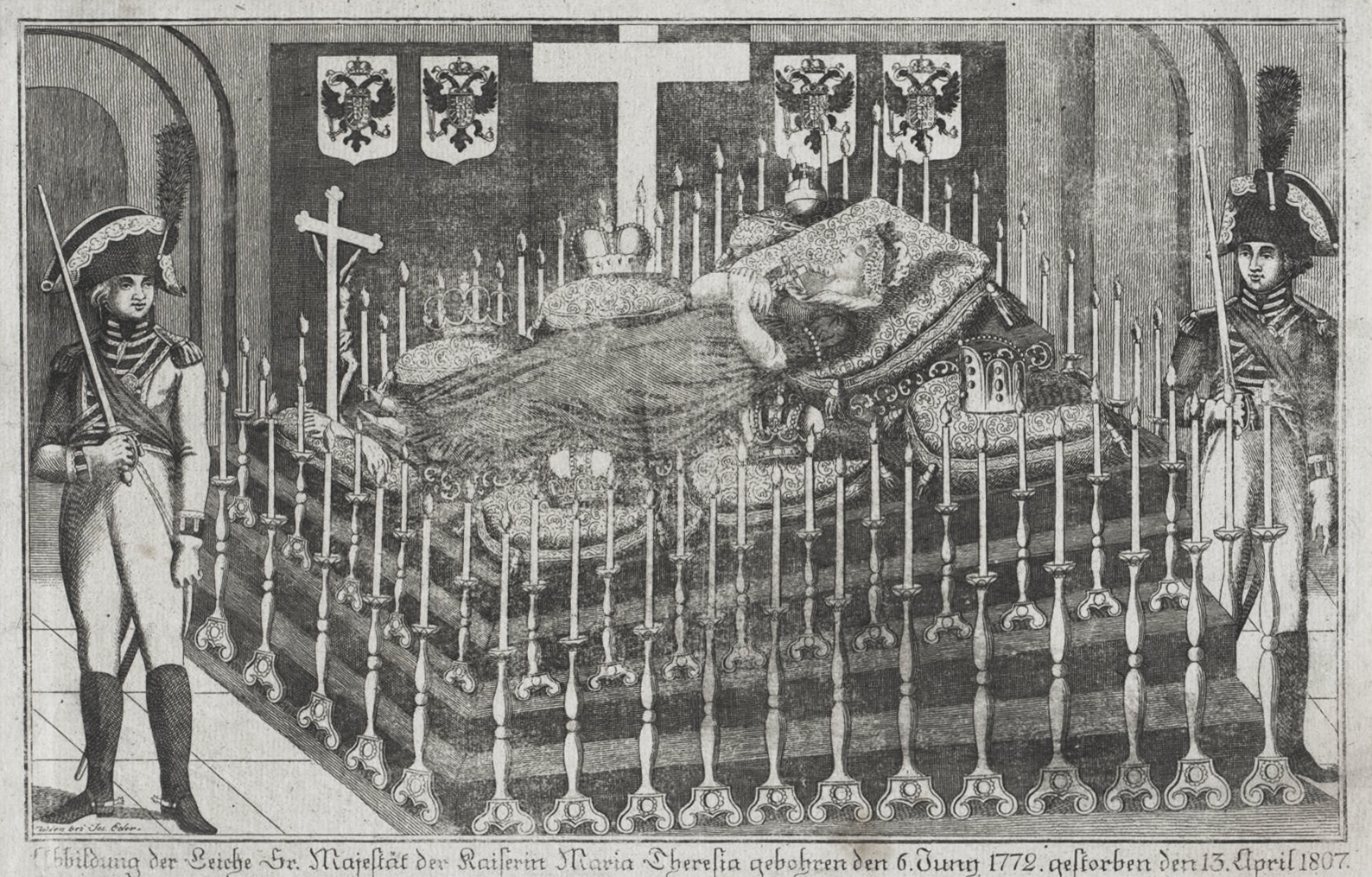
Empress Maria Teresa of the Two Sicilies lying in state.

In the winter of 1806, Empress Maria Theresa (pregnant with her 12th child) contracted tuberculous pleurisy, which the imperial physician, Andreas Joseph von Stifft, treated with bloodletting. However, it did not trigger an improvement in health. On 6 April 1807 Empress Maria Theresa gave birth prematurely to a daughter who lived only 3 days. One week later, on 13 April, the empress died as well. The emperor was inconsolable and had to be removed by force from the corpse of his wife. She was buried in the Imperial Crypt in Vienna. The shattered emperor stayed away from the funeral, instead traveling to Buda with his two eldest children. The urn containing her heart was placed in the Heart Crypt and the urn with her entrails in the Ducal Crypt. Empress Maria Theresa is one of the 41 people who received a "separate burial" with the body divided between all three traditional Viennese burial sites of the Habsburgs (Imperial Crypt, Heart Crypt, Duke Crypt).

== Issue ==
Children of Maria Theresa of Naples and Sicily
Name	Picture	Birth	Death	Notes
By Francis II, Holy Roman Emperor
Archduchess Maria Ludovica		12 December 1791	17 December 1847 (aged 56)	Married first Emperor Napoleon I of France, had issue, married second Adam, Count of Neipperg, had issue, married third to Charles, Count of Bombelles, no issue.
Emperor Ferdinand I of Austria		19 April 1793	29 June 1875 (aged 82)	Married Maria Anna of Savoy, Princess of Sardinia, no issue.
Archduchess Maria Caroline		8 June 1794	16 March 1795 (aged 0)	Died in childhood, no issue.
Archduchess Caroline Ludovika		22 December 1795	30 June 1797 (aged 1)	Died in childhood, no issue.
Archduchess Caroline Josepha Leopoldine		22 January 1797	11 December 1826 (aged 29)	Renamed Maria Leopoldina upon her marriage; married Pedro I of Brazil, had issue.
Archduchess Maria Clementina Franziska Josepha		1 March 1798	3 September 1881 (aged 83)	Married her maternal uncle Leopold, Prince of Salerno, had issue.
Archduke Joseph Franz Leopold		9 April 1799	30 June 1807 (aged 8)	Died some weeks after his mother in childhood, no issue.
Archduchess Marie Caroline		8 April 1801	22 May 1832 (aged 31)	Married Crown Prince (later King) Frederick Augustus II of Saxony, no issue.
Archduke Franz Karl		17 December 1802	8 March 1878 (aged 75)	Married Princess Sophie of Bavaria; father of Franz Joseph I of Austria and Maximilian I of Mexico.
Archduchess Marie Anna		8 June 1804	28 December 1858 (aged 54)	Born intellectually disabled (like her eldest brother, Emperor Ferdinand I) and to have suffered from a severe facial deformity. Died unmarried.
Archduke Johann Nepomuk		30 August 1805	19 February 1809 (aged 3)	Died in childhood, no issue.
Archduchess Amalie Theresa		6 April 1807	9 April 1807 (aged 0)	Died in childhood, no issue.

== Ancestry ==
Ancestors of Maria Theresa of Naples and Sicily

8. Philip V of Spain
4. Charles III of Spain
9. Elisabeth Farnese
2. Ferdinand I of the Two Sicilies
10. Augustus III of Poland
5. Maria Amalia of Saxony
11. Maria Josepha of Austria
1. Maria Theresa of Naples and Sicily
12. Leopold, Duke of Lorraine
6. Francis I, Holy Roman Emperor
13. Élisabeth Charlotte of Orléans
3. Maria Carolina of Austria
14. Charles VI, Holy Roman Emperor
7. Maria Theresa of Austria
15. Elisabeth Christine of Brunswick

== Literature ==
- Richard Reifenscheid, Die Habsburger in Lebensbildern, Piper 2006
- John A. Rice, Empress Marie Therese and Music at the Viennese Court, 1792–1807, Cambridge 2003
- Friedrich Weissensteiner: Frauen auf Habsburgs Thron – die österreichischen Kaiserinnen, Ueberreuter Wien, 1998, ISBN 3-8000-3709-2

Maria Theresa of Naples and Sicily House of Bourbon-Two Sicilies Cadet branch of the House of Bourbon Born: 6 June 1772 Died: 13 April 1807
German royalty
Preceded by Maria Luisa of Spain	Holy Roman Empress; 1792–1806	Holy Roman Empire dissolved
Preceded by Maria Luisa of Spain	Queen of the Romans; 1792–1806	Vacant Title next held by Augusta of Saxe-Weimar as German Empress
Preceded by Maria Luisa of Spain	Archduchess consort of Austria; 1792–1807	Succeeded by Maria Ludovika of Austria-Este
Preceded by Maria Luisa of Spain	Queen consort of Hungary and Bohemia; 1792–1807	Succeeded by Maria Ludovika of Austria-Este
New title Creation of Austrian Empire	Empress consort of Austria; 1804–1807	Succeeded by Maria Ludovika of Austria-Este
