= Caroline of Austria =

Caroline of Austria can refer to:

- Maria Carolina of Austria (1752–1814), Queen of Naples
- Archduchess Marie Caroline of Austria (1801–1832), Crown Princess of Saxony
- Caroline Augusta of Bavaria (1792–1873), Empress of Austria
