= Joseph Franz =

Joseph Franz may refer to:

- Archduke Joseph Franz of Austria (1799–1807), second son and seventh child of Francis II
- Joseph Franz, Prince of Dietrichstein (1798–1858), German prince
- Joseph Franz (director) (1883–1970), American actor and film director

== See also ==
- Franz Joseph (disambiguation)
