= Schloss Hetzendorf =

Baroque palace in Hetzendorf, Vienna

Coordinates: 48°09′58″N 16°18′30″E

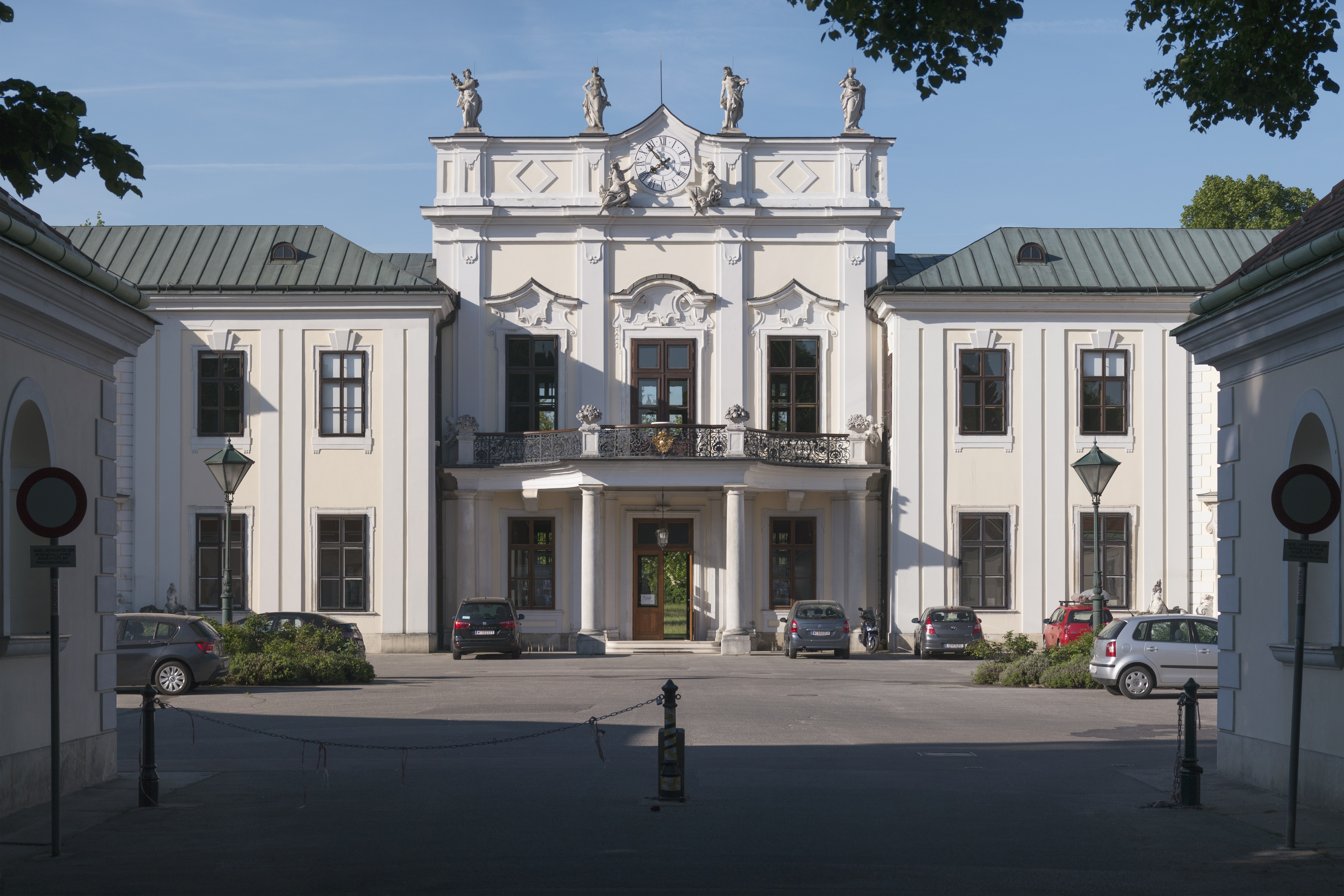
Front facade

Schloss Hetzendorf is a baroque palace in Hetzendorf, Meidling, Vienna, that was used by the imperial Habsburg family.

== History ==
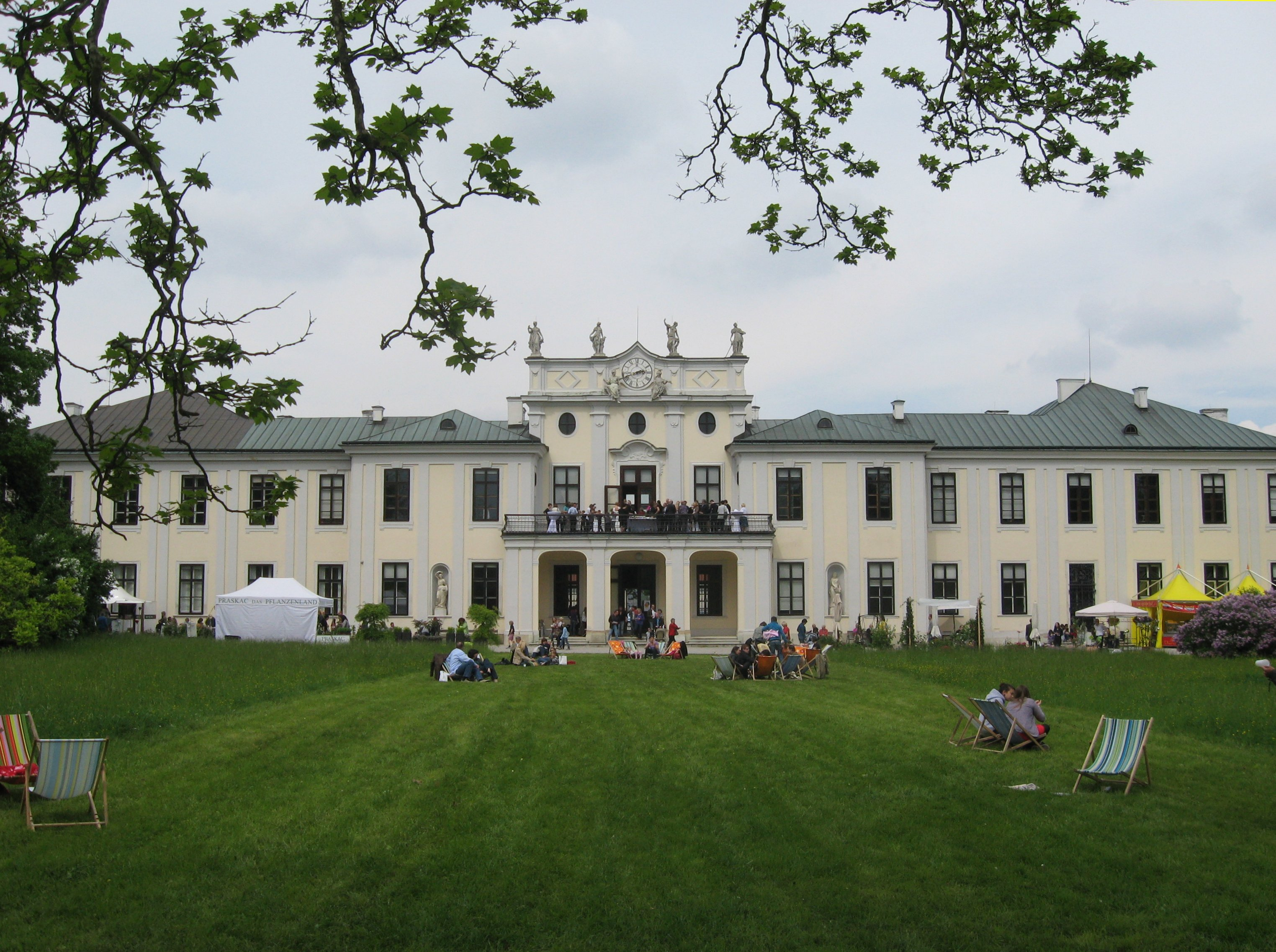
Facade facing the park

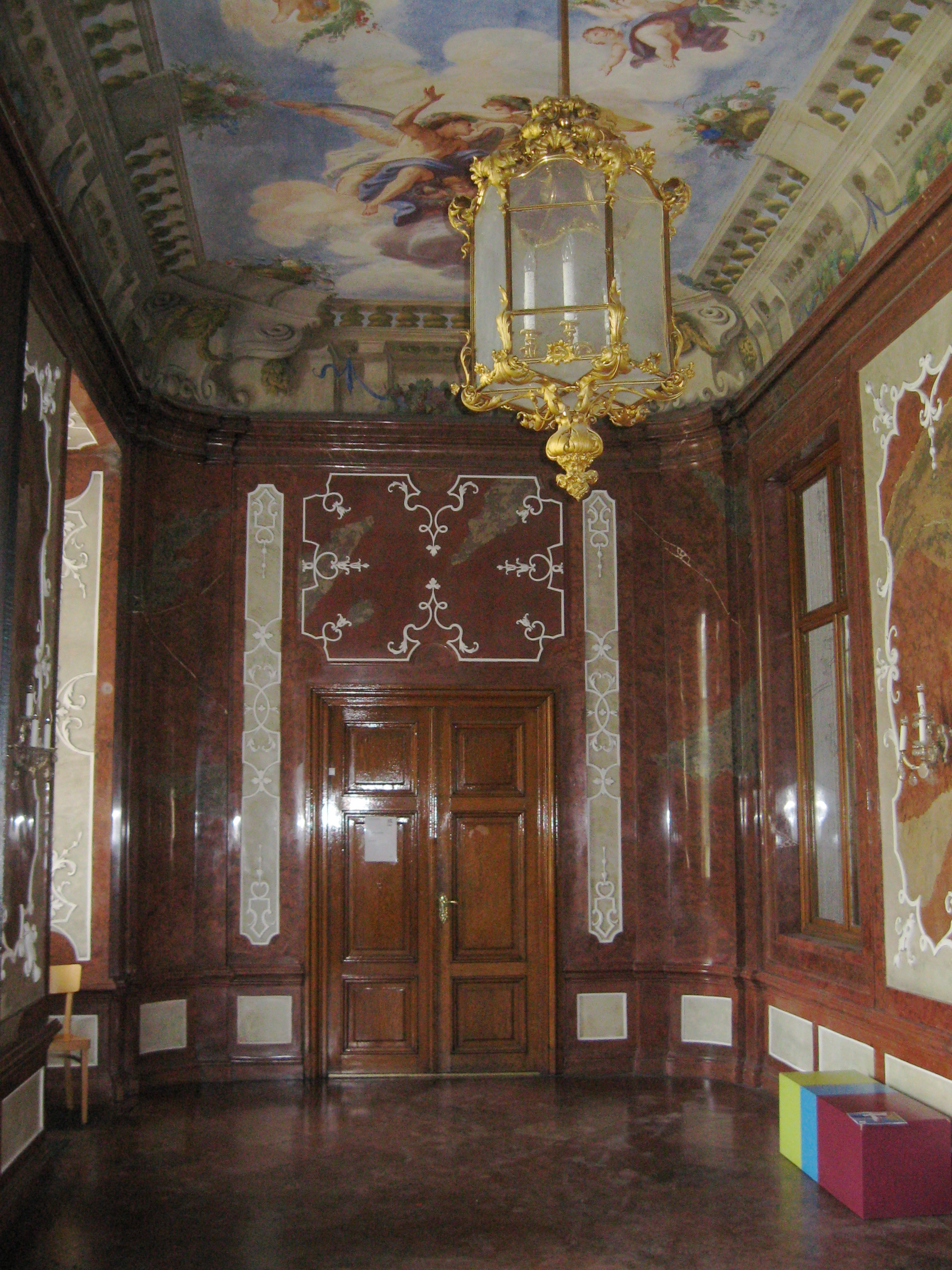
Sala terrena

The building was originally a hunting lodge. It was refashioned by the architect Johann Lucas von Hildebrandt. Empress Maria Theresa had it enlarged in 1743 by Nicolò Pacassi for her mother, Empress Elizabeth Christine, who lived here from 1743 until her death in 1750. A prominent feature of the palace is the entrance hall.

It was here that Maria Carolina of Austria, Queen of Naples, died in 1814. She was the favourite sister of Marie Antoinette.

The youngest daughter of Emperor Francis II, Archduchess Maria Anna, lived here from 1835 until her death in 1858. She is said to have been mentally disabled and to have suffered from a severe facial deformity.

It was at Hetzendorf that future Empress Zita gave birth to her daughter, Archduchess Adelheid of Austria, in 1914. Adelheid was the second child of Empress Zita and future Emperor Charles I of Austria.

Today it houses a fashion school.
