= Archduchess Marie Anne of Austria =

Archduchess of Austria (1804–1858)

Marie Anne of Austria
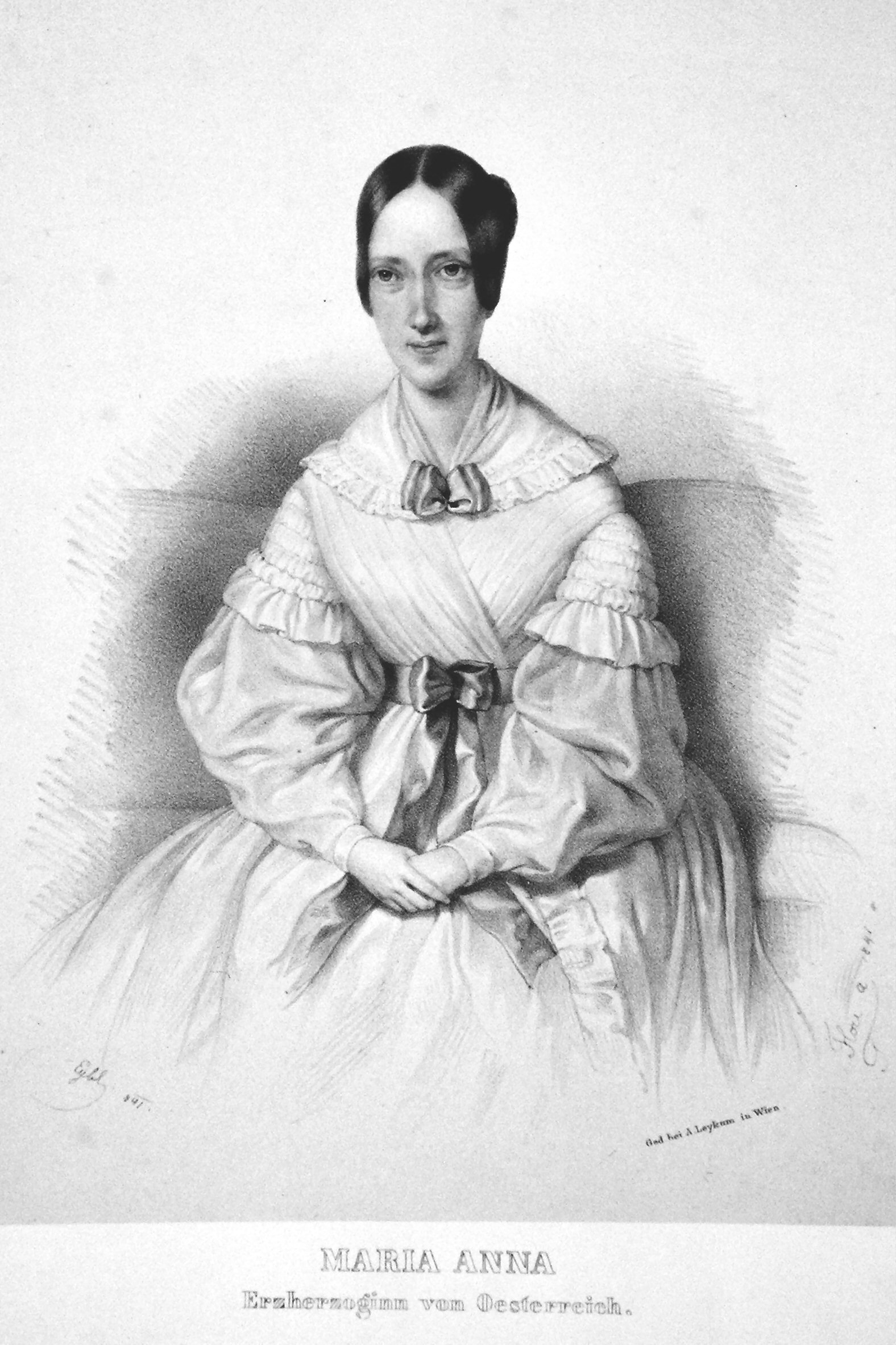
- Marie Anne, by Franz Eybl in 1841
- Born: 8 June 1804; Hofburg Palace, Vienna, Archduchy of Austria, Holy Roman Empire
- Died: 28 December 1858 (aged 54); Hetzendorf Palace, Vienna, Austrian Empire
- Burial: Imperial Crypt, Vienna, Austria
Names
- German: Maria Anna Franziska Theresia Josepha Medarde
- House: Habsburg-Lorraine
- Father: Francis II, Holy Roman Emperor
- Mother: Maria Theresa of Naples and Sicily

Marie Anne of Austria (Maria Anna Franziska Theresia Josepha Medarde; 8 June 1804 – 28 December 1858) was an Archduchess of Austria as the daughter of Francis II, Holy Roman Emperor and his second wife, Maria Theresa of Naples and Sicily. Marie Anne never married or had any children. She was intellectually disabled with a severe facial deformity, and spent the last 20 years of her life in Hetzendorf Palace.

== Biography ==
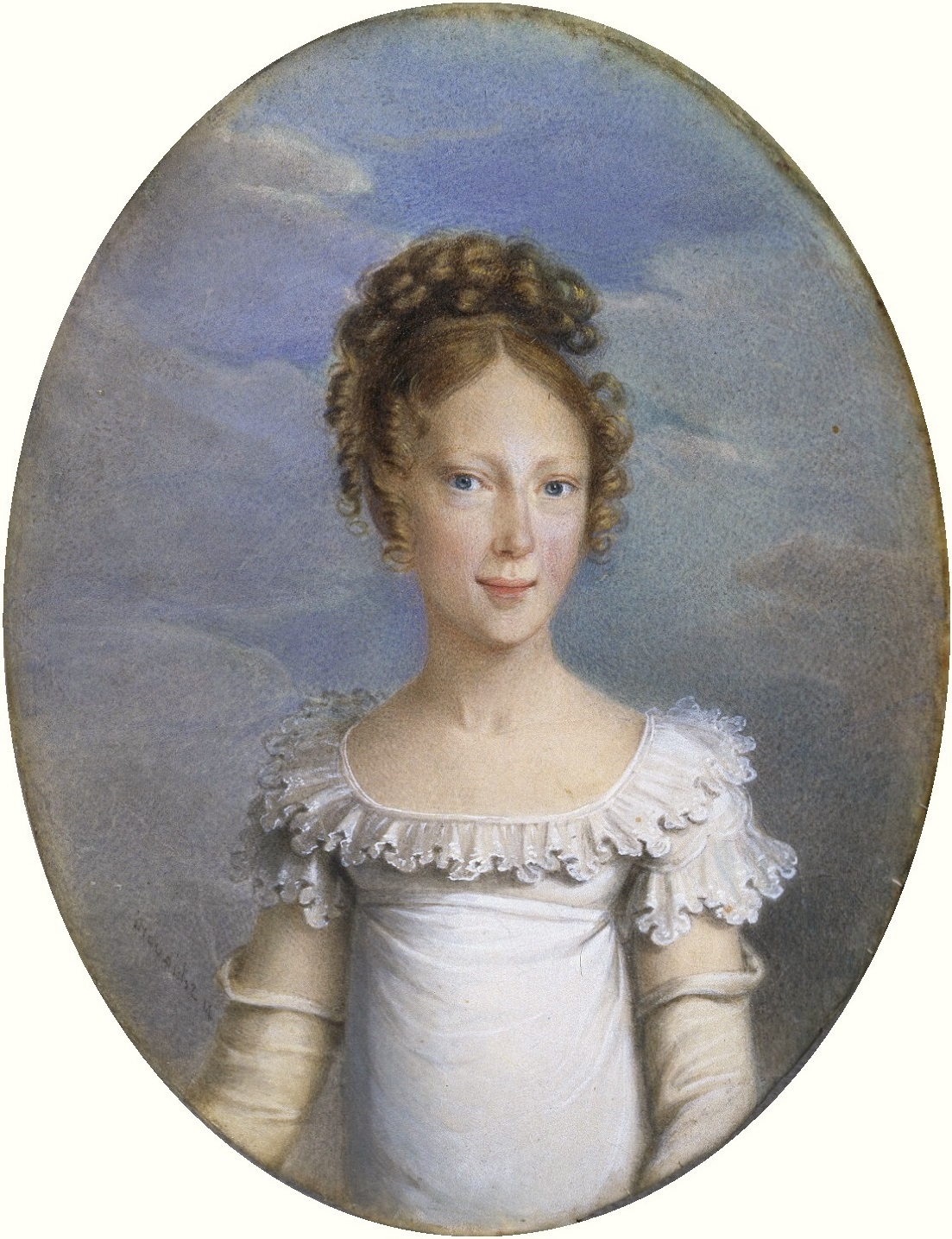
A young Marie Anne (c. 1817)

Marie Anne was born on 8 June 1804 at the Hofburg palace in Vienna. She was the tenth child born to her parents, the Holy Roman Emperor Francis II by his second wife, Princess Maria Theresa of Naples and Sicily. In 1807, her mother died seven days after giving birth to her only younger sister, Archduchess Amalie Theresa, who died three days after being born.

Like her eldest brother, Emperor Ferdinand I, Marie Anne was intellectually disabled. She was born with a severe facial deformity, probably linked to the genetic inbreeding within her family; her parents were double first cousins.

After living in the Schönbrunn Palace, she was moved in 1835 to Hetzendorf Palace, where she spent the rest of her life, and where she died on 28 December 1858 at the age of 54.

Marie Anne was buried at the Capuchin Church in Vienna, more specifically in the Imperial Crypt, the burial place of her siblings Marie Louise, Duchess of Parma, Ferdinand I of Austria, Archduchess Marie Caroline, Archduchess Caroline Ludovika of Austria, Archduke Johann Nepomuk of Austria, Archduchess Amalie Theresa of Austria, and Archduke Franz Karl of Austria. Her parents, Francis II, Holy Roman Emperor and Maria Theresa of Naples and Sicily, and her great-grandmother, Maria Theresa of Austria, are also buried there.

== Ancestry ==
Ancestors of Archduchess Marie Anne of Austria

8. Francis I, Holy Roman Emperor (= 14)
4. Leopold II, Holy Roman Emperor
9. Maria Theresa of Austria (= 15)
2. Francis II, Holy Roman Emperor
10. Charles III of Spain (= 12)
5. Maria Luisa of Spain
11. Maria Amalia of Saxony (= 13)
1. Archduchess Marie Anne of Austria
12. Charles III of Spain (= 10)
6. Ferdinand I of the Two Sicilies
13. Maria Amalia of Saxony (= 11)
3. Maria Theresa of Naples and Sicily
14. Francis I, Holy Roman Emperor (= 8)
7. Maria Carolina of Austria
15. Maria Theresa of Austria (= 9)
