= Francis Joseph =

Francis Joseph may refer to:

- Franz Joseph I of Austria (1830–1916), Emperor of Austria, Apostolic King of Hungary and King of Bohemia
- Francis Joseph, Duke of Guise (1670–1675), French Duke of Guise and Joyeuse and Prince of Joinville
- Prince Francis Joseph of Braganza (1879–1919), Portuguese royal
- Francis Joseph (footballer) (1960–2022), English professional footballer
- Francis L'Estrange Joseph (1870–1951), British industrialist

== See also ==
- Franz Joseph (disambiguation)
- Joseph Francis (disambiguation)
