= Franz Joseph (disambiguation) =

Franz Joseph I of Austria (1830–1916) was Emperor of Austria, Apostolic King of Hungary and King of Bohemia.

Franz Josef or Franz Joseph may also refer to:

== People known solely by the name ==
- Franz Joseph I, Prince of Liechtenstein (1726–1781), Knight of the Golden Fleece
- Franz Joseph II, Prince of Liechtenstein (1906–1989), Knight of the Golden Fleece
- Franz Joseph, Prince of Hohenzollern-Emden (1891–1964), Nazi party member and SS officer
- Franz Joseph, 9th Prince of Thurn and Taxis (1893–1971)
- Franz Joseph, Prince of Hohenlohe-Schillingsfürst (1787–1841)
- Franz Joseph, Prince of Dietrichstein (1767–1854)
- Franz Joseph, Count Kinsky (1739–1805)
- Franz Joseph, Marquis de Lusignan (1753–1832)
- Franz Joseph (artist) (1914–1994), artist and author loosely associated with Star Trek

== People with the given name ==
- Franz Joseph Antony (1790–1837), choral composer
- Franz Josef Degenhardt (1931–2011), German poet, writer, musician and politician
- Franz Joseph Feuchtmayer (1660–1718), sculptor and stuccoist
- Franz Joseph Emil Fischer (1877–1947), German chemist
- Franz Joseph Gall (1758–1828), neuroanatomist and physiologist
- Franz Joseph Otto von Habsburg (1912–2011), the last Crown Prince of Austria-Hungary
- Franz Joseph Haydn (1732–1809), composer
- Franz Joseph Molitor (1779–1860), German writer and philosopher
- Franz-Joseph Müller von Reichenstein (1740–1825), Hungarian mineralogist
- Eligius Franz Joseph von Münch-Bellinghausen (1806–1871), Austrian dramatist, poet and short-story writer
- Franz Josef Strauss (1915–1988), German politician
- Franz Josef Wagner (1943–2025), German journalist, editor, and author
- Franz-Josef Wuermeling (1900–1986), West German politician and government minister

== Places ==
- Franz Josef / Waiau, a town in the South Island of New Zealand
- Franz Josef Glacier, in the South Island of New Zealand
- Franz Josef Land, an archipelago in the Arctic Ocean, in the far north of Russia

== Ships ==
- SMS Kaiser Franz Joseph I, Austro-Hungarian Navy's Kaiser Franz Joseph I-class cruiser
- SS Kaiser Franz Joseph I, passenger liner ship

== See also ==
- Joseph Franz (disambiguation)
- Francis Joseph (disambiguation)
