= Joe Francis (rugby union) =

South African rugby union player

- Full name: Joseph Adrian Jooste Francis
- Born: 24 January 1889 Gatooma, Rhodesia
- Died: 20 December 1924 (aged 35)
- Height: 1.83 m (6 ft 0 in)
- Weight: 86.2 kg (190 lb)

Rugby union career
- Position: Forward
Provincial / State sides
Years	Team	Apps	(Points)
- Transvaal
International career
Years	Team	Apps	(Points)
1912–13	South Africa	5	(6)

Joseph Adrian Jooste Francis (24 January 1889 – 20 December 1924) was a South African international rugby union player.

A Transvaal forward, Francis was a member of the Springboks for their 1912–13 tour of Europe, where he appeared in all five international fixtures, scoring tries against Ireland and France to help secure a 5–0 whitewash.

Francis is believed to be the first Rhodesian–born player to represent the Springboks.

== See also ==
- List of South Africa national rugby union players
