= Duchess Elisabeth of Württemberg =

Archduchess of Austria (1767–1790)

Duchess Elisabeth
- Archduchess of Austria
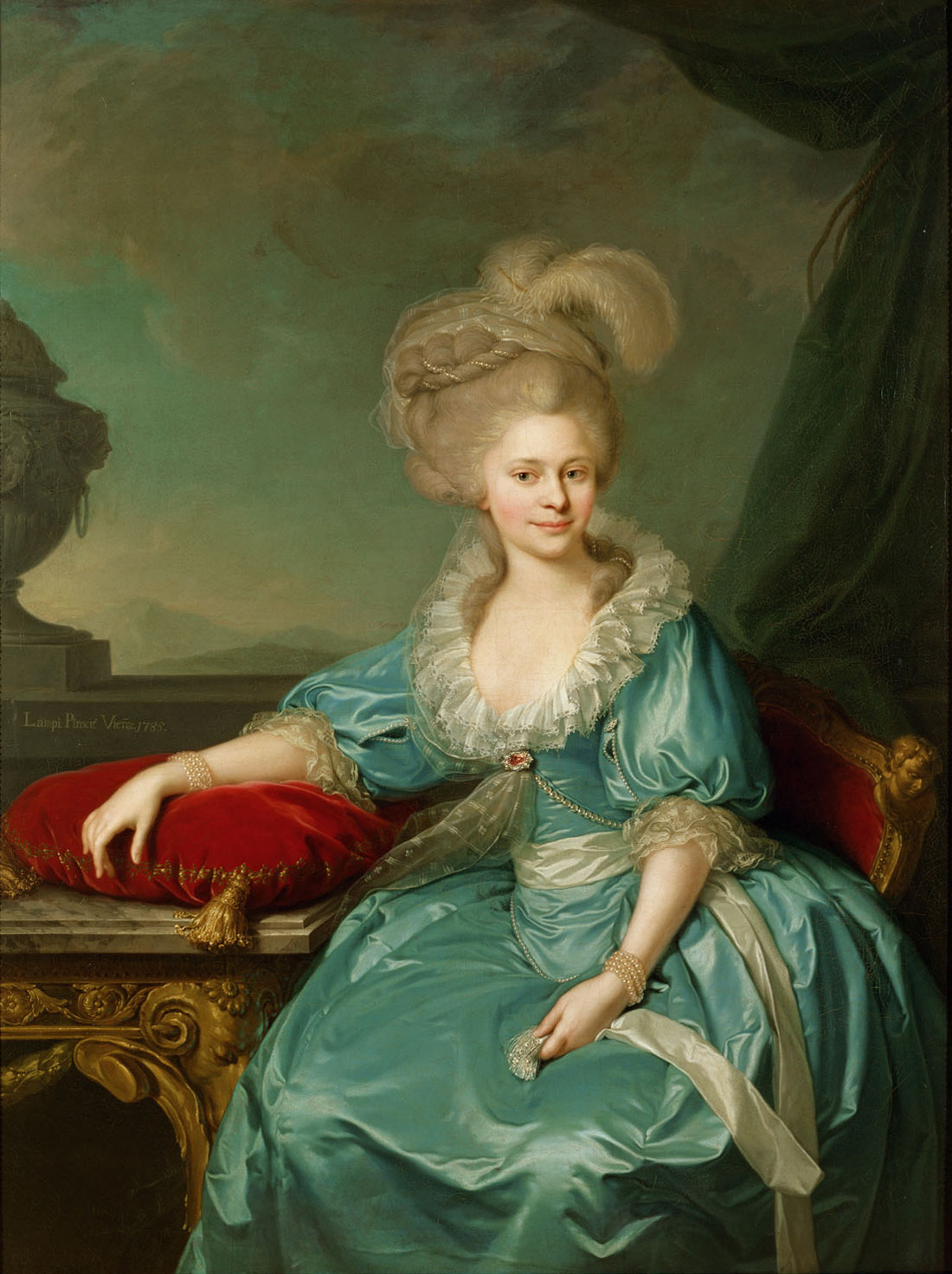
- Portrait by Johann Baptist von Lampi the Elder
- Born: 21 April 1767; Treptow an der Rega, Pomerania, Kingdom of Prussia
- Died: 18 February 1790 (aged 22); Vienna, Archduchy of Austria, Holy Roman Empire
- Burial: Imperial Crypt
- Spouse: Archduke Francis of Austria (m. 1788)
- Issue: Archduchess Ludovika Elisabeth
Names
- Elisabeth Wilhelmine Luise
- House: Württemberg
- Father: Frederick II Eugene, Duke of Württemberg
- Mother: Princess Sophia Dorothea of Brandenburg-Schwedt
- Religion: Roman Catholicism prev. Lutheranism

Elisabeth of Württemberg (Elisabeth Wilhelmine Luise; 21 April 1767 – 18 February 1790) was a duchess of Württemberg by birth and an archduchess of Austria by her marriage to Archduke Francis of Austria.

== Life ==
Elisabeth Wilhelmine Luise was born on 21 April 1767, in Treptow an der Rega, Province of Pomerania (present-day Trzebiatów, Poland) as the third daughter and eighth child of Frederick II Eugene, Duke of Württemberg and his wife, born Princess Friederike of Brandenburg-Schwedt.

At the age of fifteen, she was summoned by the Holy Roman Emperor, Joseph II, to Vienna. There, she was educated in a convent of the Salesian sisters converted to Roman Catholicism in anticipation for her marriage to Joseph's nephew Francis, the son of his heir presumptive Leopold. They were married in Vienna on 6 January 1788. At this time, Emperor Joseph was in ill health; the young archduchess became close to the emperor and brightened his last years with her youthful charm.

At the end of 1789, Elisabeth became pregnant; however, her condition was very delicate. On 15 February 1790, after attending the anointing of the sick for the dying emperor, Elisabeth fainted. On the night of 18 February, after a twenty-four-hour delivery, she prematurely gave birth to Archduchess Ludovika Elisabeth, who lived for sixteen months. Despite an emergency operation to save her life, Elisabeth did not survive and was buried in the Imperial Crypt. Her death was the final blow to the Emperor Joseph, who died two days later.

== Issue ==
- Archduchess Ludovika Elisabeth of Austria (18 Feb 1790 – 24 June 1791), died in infancy.

== Archives ==
Elisabeth's letters to her parents, Frederick II Eugene, Duke of Württemberg and Princess Friederike of Brandenburg-Schwedt, written between 1780 and 1790, are preserved in the State Archive of Stuttgart (Hauptstaatsarchiv Stuttgart) in Stuttgart, Germany. Elisabeth's letters to her brother, Charles Frederick Henry of Württemberg, are also preserved in the State Archive of Stuttgart.

== Ancestry ==
Ancestors of Duchess Elisabeth of Württemberg

8. Frederick Charles, Duke of Württemberg-Winnental
4. Charles Alexander, Duke of Württemberg
9. Princess Eleonore Juliane of Brandenburg-Ansbach
2. Frederick II Eugene, Duke of Württemberg
10. Anselm Franz, Prince of Thurn and Taxis
5. Princess Marie Auguste of Thurn and Taxis
11. Princess Maria Ludovika of Lobkowicz
1. Duchess Elisabeth of Württemberg
12. Philip William, Margrave of Brandenburg-Schwedt
6. Frederick William, Margrave of Brandenburg-Schwedt
13. Princess Johanna Charlotte of Anhalt-Dessau
3. Princess Friederike of Brandenburg-Schwedt
14. Frederick William I of Prussia
7. Princess Sophia Dorothea of Prussia
15. Princess Sophia Dorothea of Hanover
