= Joseph A. Francis =

American football coach

Coaching career (HC unless noted)
- 1914: Middlebury

Head coaching record
- Overall: 2–5–1

Joseph A. Francis was the head football coach for the Middlebury College Panthers football team in 1914. He compiled a record of 2–5–1.

== Head coaching record ==
Year	Team	Overall	Conference	Standing	Bowl/playoffs
Middlebury (Independent) (1914)
1914	Middlebury	2–5–1			
Middlebury:		2–5–1			
Total:		2–5–1			
