= Francis II, Holy Roman Emperor =

Holy Roman Emperor (1792–1806), Emperor of Austria (1804–1835)

Francis II and I
- Imperator Romanorum
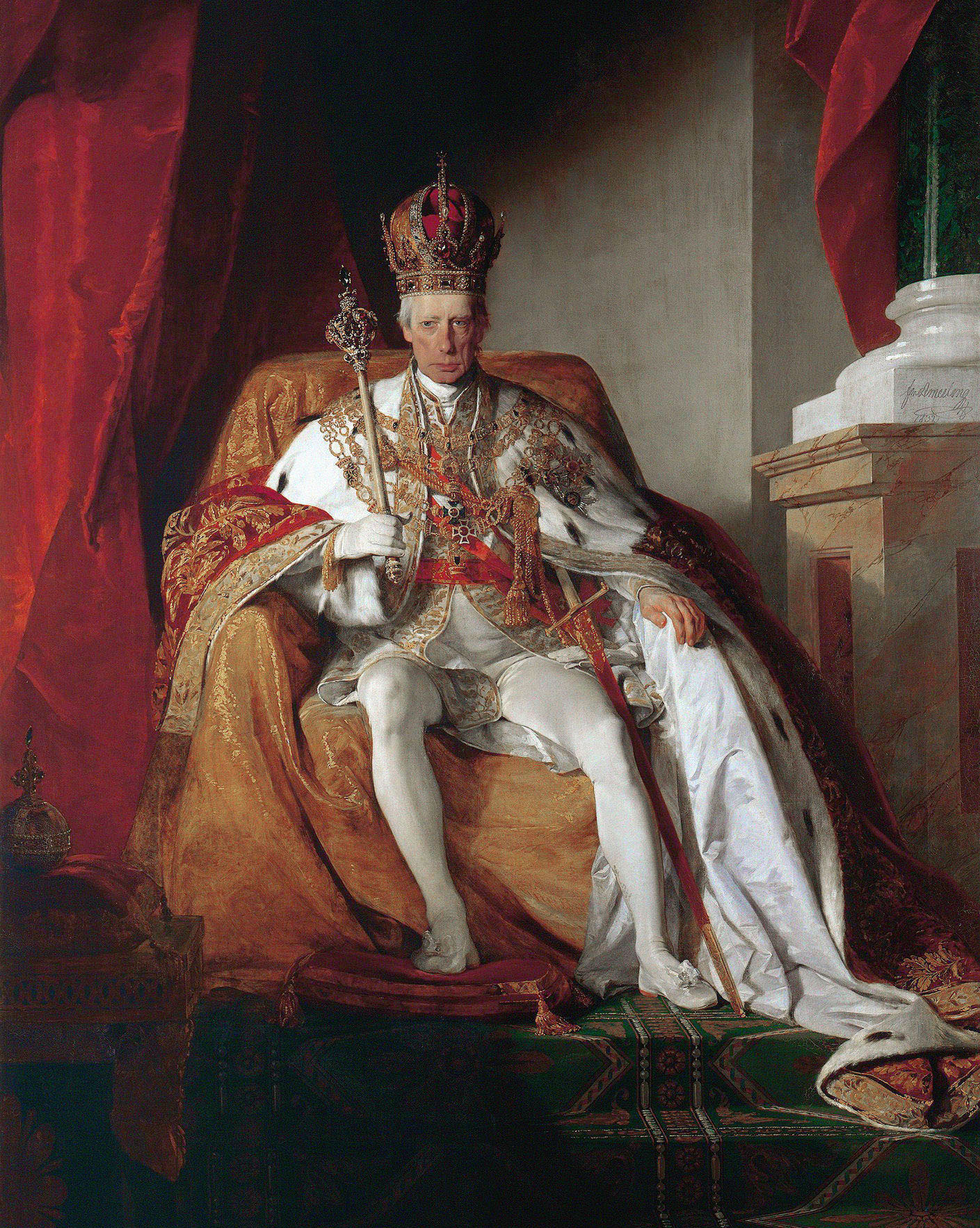
- Portrait by Friedrich von Amerling, c. 1832

Holy Roman Emperor
- Reign: 5 July 1792 – 6 August 1806
- Coronation: 14 July 1792; Frankfurt Cathedral
- Predecessor: Leopold II
- Successor: Monarchy abolished (Napoleon as Protector of the Confederation of the Rhine)

Archduke/Emperor of Austria
- Reign: 1 March 1792/11 August 1804 – 2 March 1835
- Predecessor: Leopold VII
- Successor: Ferdinand I
- Chancellor: Klemens von Metternich

King of Hungary, Croatia and Bohemia
- Reign: 1 March 1792 – 2 March 1835
- Coronations: 6 June 1792, Buda; 9 August 1792, Prague
- Predecessor: Leopold II
- Successor: Ferdinand V

King of Lombardy–Venetia
- Reign: 9 June 1815 – 2 March 1835
- Successor: Ferdinand I

Head of Präsidialmacht Austria
- In office 20 June 1815 – 2 March 1835
- Succeeded by: Ferdinand I
- Born: 12 February 1768; Florence, Grand Duchy of Tuscany
- Died: 2 March 1835 (aged 67); Vienna, Austrian Empire
- Burial: Imperial Crypt
- Spouses: Elisabeth of Württemberg (m. 1788; died 1790) Maria Theresa of Naples and Sicily (m. 1790; died 1807) Maria Ludovika of Austria-Este (m. 1808; died 1816) Caroline Augusta of Bavaria (m. 1816)
- Issue Detail: Archduchess Ludovika Elisabeth; Marie Louise, Empress of the French and Duchess of Parma; Ferdinand I, Emperor of Austria; Maria Leopoldina, Empress of Brazil and Queen of Portugal; Clementina, Princess of Salerno; Archduke Joseph Franz of Austria; Marie Caroline, Crown Princess of Saxony; Archduke Franz Karl of Austria; Archduchess Marie Anne of Austria
Names
- Franz Josef Karl
- House: Habsburg-Lorraine
- Father: Leopold II, Holy Roman Emperor
- Mother: Maria Luisa of Spain
- Religion: Roman Catholicism

Francis II and I (German: Franz II; 12 February 1768 – 2 March 1835) was the last Holy Roman Emperor (as Francis II) from 1792 to 1806, and the first Emperor of Austria (as Francis I) from 1804 to 1835. He was also King of Germany, Hungary, Croatia and Bohemia, and served as the first president of the German Confederation following its establishment in 1815.

The eldest son of future Emperor Leopold II and Maria Luisa of Spain, Francis was born in Florence, where his father ruled as Grand Duke of Tuscany. Leopold became Holy Roman Emperor in 1790 but died two years later, and Francis succeeded him. At the time of Francis's accession, his empire was already embroiled in the French Revolutionary Wars, the first of which ended in Austrian defeat and the loss of the left bank of the Rhine to France. After another French victory in the War of the Second Coalition, Napoleon crowned himself Emperor of the French. In response, Francis assumed the title of Emperor of Austria. He continued his leading role as Napoleon's adversary in the Napoleonic Wars, and suffered successive defeats that greatly weakened Austria as a European power. In 1806, after Napoleon created the Confederation of the Rhine, Francis abdicated as Holy Roman Emperor, which in effect marked the dissolution of the Holy Roman Empire. Following the defeat of the Fifth Coalition, Francis ceded more territory to France and was forced to wed his daughter Marie Louise to Napoleon.

In 1813, Francis turned against Napoleon and finally defeated him in the War of the Sixth Coalition, forcing the French emperor to abdicate. Austria took part as a leading member of the Holy Alliance at the Congress of Vienna, which was largely dominated by Francis's chancellor Klemens von Metternich, culminating in a new European order and the restoration of most of Francis's ancient dominions. Due to the establishment of the Concert of Europe, which resisted popular nationalist and liberal tendencies, Francis was viewed as a reactionary later in his reign. Francis died in 1835 at the age of 67 and was succeeded by his son, Ferdinand I of Austria.

== Early life ==
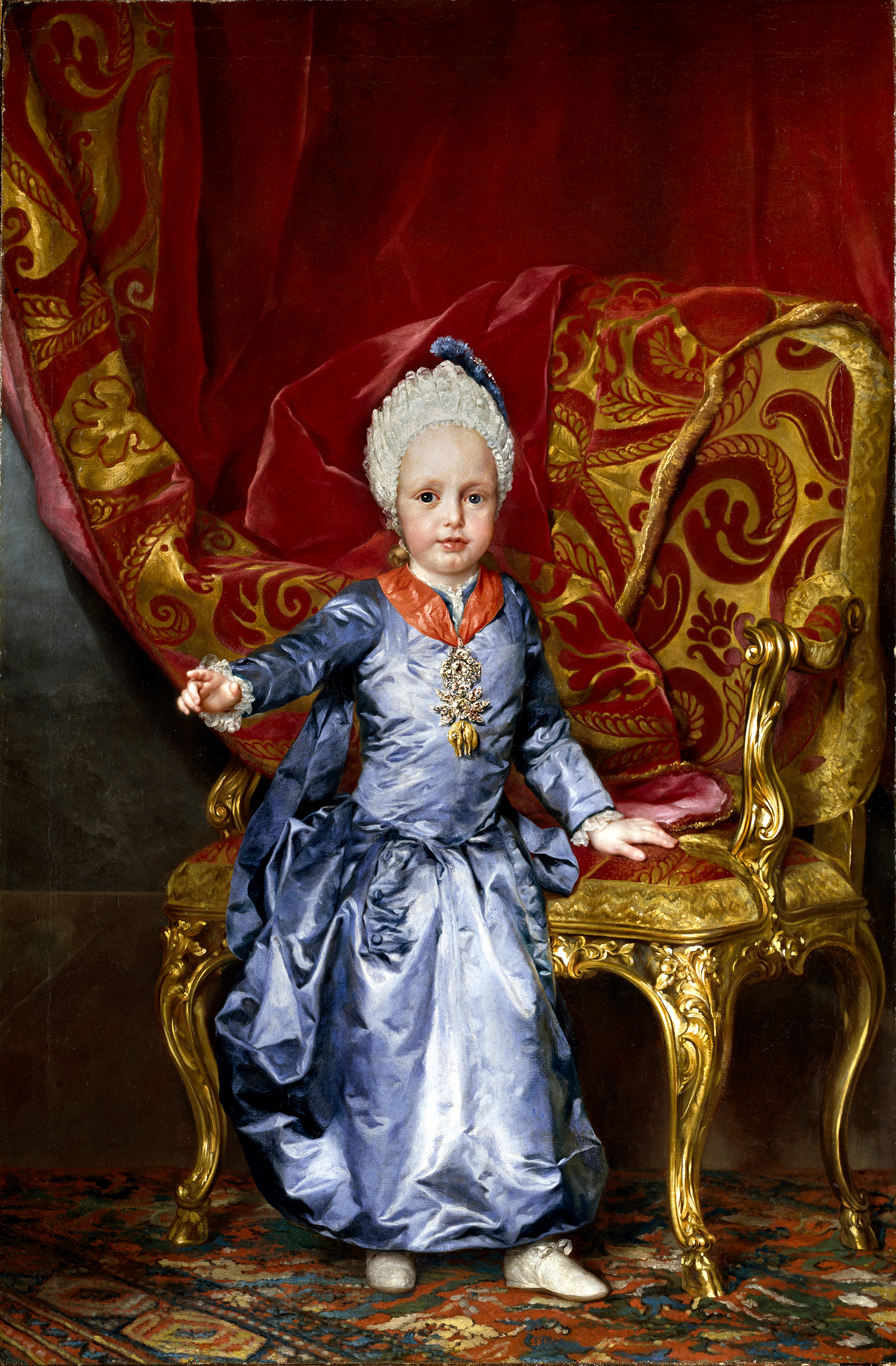
1770 painting by Anton Raphael Mengs depicting Archduke Francis at the age of 2

Francis was a son of Leopold II, Holy Roman Emperor (1747–1792) and his wife Maria Luisa of Spain (1745–1792), daughter of Charles III of Spain. Francis was born in Florence, the capital of Tuscany, where his father reigned as Grand Duke from 1765 to 1790. Though he had a happy childhood surrounded by his many siblings, his family knew Francis was likely to be a future Emperor (his uncle Joseph II, Holy Roman Emperor had no surviving issue from either of his two marriages), and so in 1784 the young Archduke was sent to the Imperial Court in Vienna to educate and prepare him for his future role.

Joseph II himself took charge of Francis's development. His disciplinarian regime was a stark contrast to the indulgent Florentine Court of Leopold. The Emperor wrote that Francis was "stunted in growth", "backward in bodily dexterity and deportment", and "neither more nor less than a spoiled mother's child." Joseph concluded that "the manner in which he was treated for upwards of sixteen years could not but have confirmed him in the delusion that the preservation of his own person was the only thing of importance."

Joseph's martinet method of improving the young Francis was "fear and unpleasantness." The young Archduke was isolated, the reasoning being that this would make him more self-sufficient, as it was felt by Joseph that Francis "failed to lead himself, to do his own thinking." Nonetheless, Francis greatly admired his uncle, if rather in fear of him. To complete his training, Francis was sent to join an army regiment in Hungary and he settled easily into the routine of military life. He was present at the siege of Belgrade which occurred during the Austro-Turkish War.

After the death of Joseph II in 1790, Francis's father became Emperor. He had an early taste of power while acting as Leopold's deputy in Vienna, while the incoming Emperor traversed the Empire attempting to win back those alienated by his brother's policies. The strain took a toll on Leopold and by the winter of 1791, he became ill. He gradually worsened throughout early 1792; on the afternoon of 1 March, Leopold died, at the relatively young age of 44. Francis, just past his 24th birthday, was now Emperor, much sooner than he had expected.

== Emperor ==
=== Wars with France ===
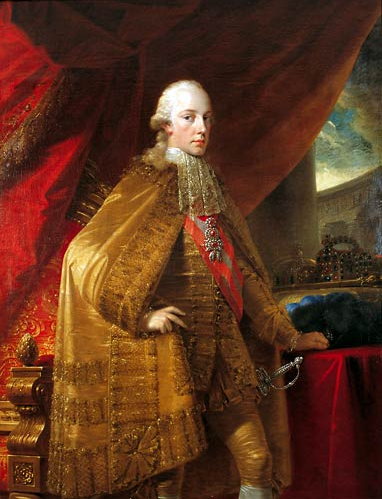
Painting of Francis II at the age of 24, wearing the Order of the Golden Fleece, with the Imperial Crown of the Holy Roman Empire and Hungary's Crown of Saint Stephen in the background (1792)

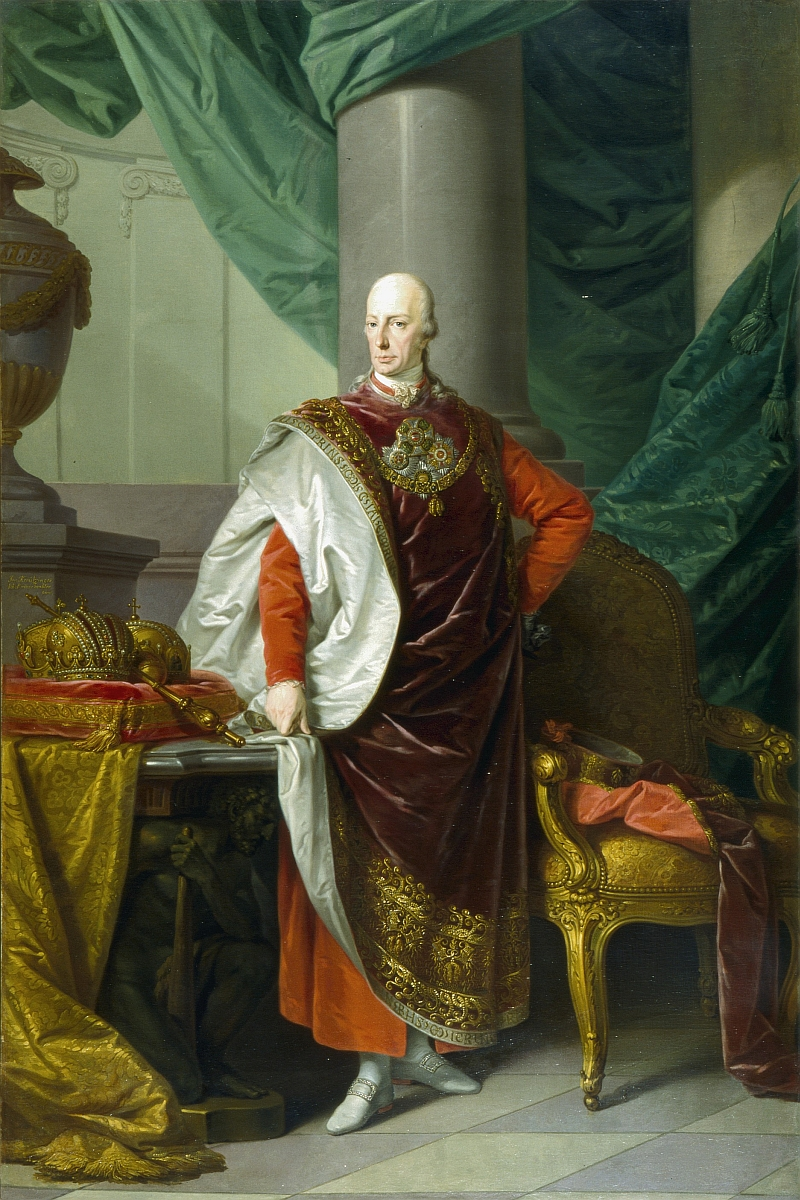
Francis I as Austrian Emperor wearing the Order of the Golden Fleece, undated

As the head of the Holy Roman Empire and the ruler of the vast realms of Central and Eastern Europe, Francis felt threatened by the French Revolutionaries and later Napoleon's expansionism as well as their social and political reforms, which were being exported throughout Europe in the wake of the conquering French armies. Francis had a fraught relationship with France. His aunt Marie Antoinette, the wife of Louis XVI and Queen consort of France, was guillotined by the revolutionaries in 1793, at the beginning of his reign, although, on the whole, he was indifferent to her fate.

Later, he led the Holy Roman Empire into the French Revolutionary Wars. He briefly commanded the Allied forces during the Flanders Campaign of 1794 before handing over command to his brother Archduke Charles, Duke of Teschen. He was later defeated by Napoleon. By the Treaty of Campo Formio, he ceded the left bank of the Rhine to France in exchange for Venice and Dalmatia. He again fought against France during the War of the Second Coalition.

On 11 August 1804, in response to Napoleon crowning himself as emperor of the French earlier that year, he announced that he would henceforth assume the title of hereditary emperor of Austria as Francis I, a move that technically was illegal in terms of imperial law. Yet Napoleon had agreed beforehand and therefore it happened. (Note: Later he was dubbed the first Doppelkaiser (double emperor) in history. For the two years between 1804 and 1806, Francis used the title and style by the Grace of God elected Roman Emperor, ever Augustus, hereditary Emperor of Austria and he was called the Emperor of both the Holy Roman Empire and Austria.)

=== Napoleonic Wars ===
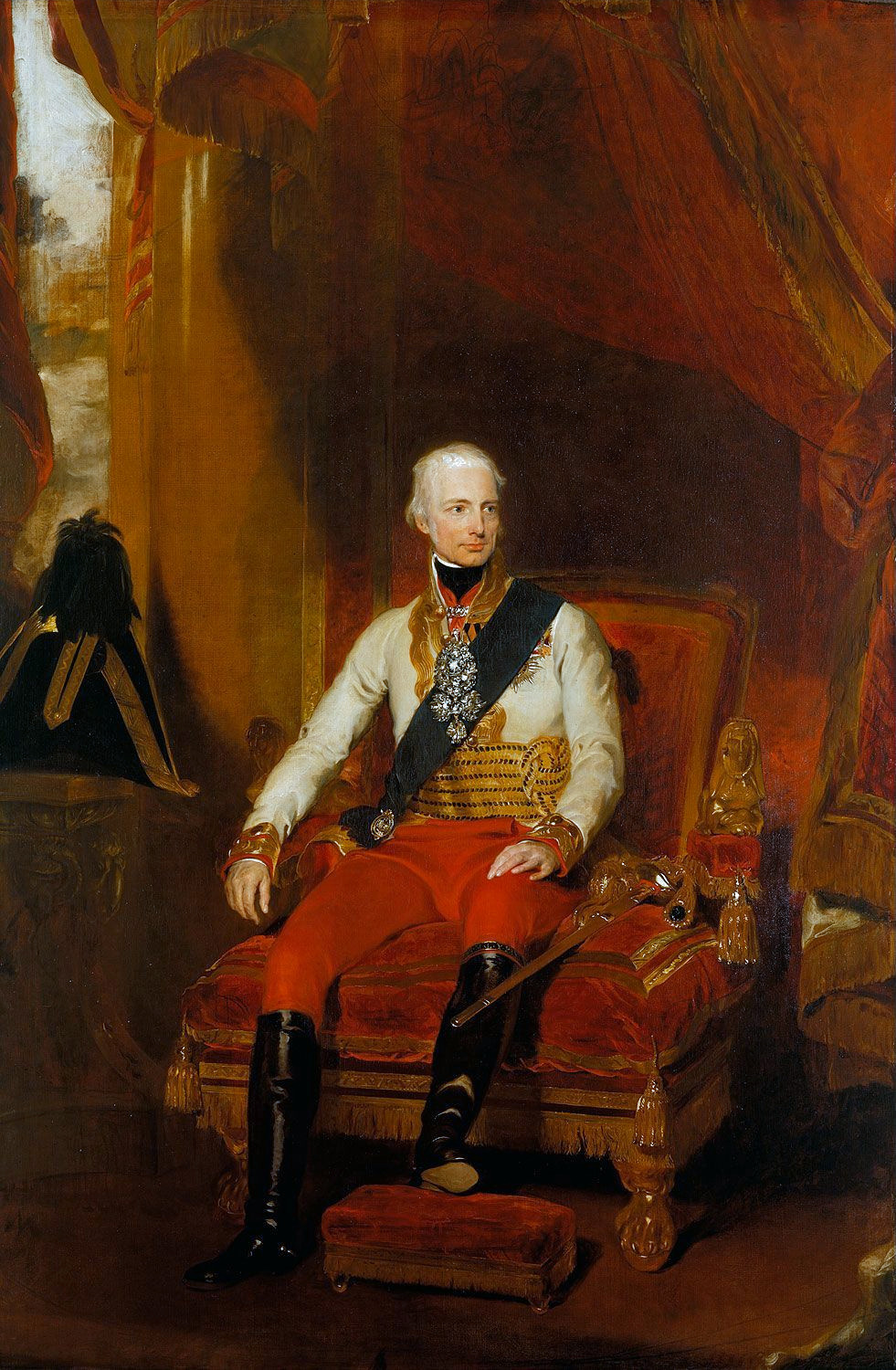
Portrait of Francis I of Austria, by Thomas Lawrence, c. 1818–1819

During the War of the Third Coalition, the Austrian forces met a crushing defeat at Austerlitz, and Francis had to agree to the Treaty of Pressburg, which greatly weakened Austria and brought about the final collapse of the Holy Roman Empire. In July 1806, under massive pressure from France, Bavaria and fifteen other German states ratified the statutes founding the Confederation of the Rhine, with Napoleon designated Protector, and they announced to the Imperial Diet their intention to leave the Empire with immediate effect. Then, on 22 July, Napoleon issued an ultimatum to Francis demanding that he abdicate as Holy Roman Emperor by 10 August.

Five days later, Francis bowed to the inevitable and, without mentioning the ultimatum, affirmed that since the Peace of Pressburg he had tried his best to fulfil his duties as emperor but that circumstances had convinced him that he could no longer rule according to his oath of office, the formation of the Confederation of the Rhine making that impossible. He added that "we hereby decree that we regard the bond which until now tied us to the states of the Empire as dissolved" in effect dissolving the empire. At the same time, he declared the complete and formal withdrawal of his hereditary lands from imperial jurisdiction. After that date, he continued to reign as Francis I, Emperor of Austria.

In 1809, Francis, deeming another war with France as inevitable and influenced by hawks in Vienna, attacked France again, hoping to take advantage of the Peninsular War embroiling Napoleon in Spain. He was again defeated, and this time forced to ally himself with Napoleon, ceding territory to the Empire, joining the Continental System, and marrying his daughter Marie Louise of Austria to the Emperor. The Napoleonic Wars drastically weakened Austria, making it entirely landlocked and threatening its preeminence among the states of Germany, a position that it would eventually cede to the Kingdom of Prussia.

In 1813, for the fifth and final time, Austria turned against France and joined Great Britain, Russia, Prussia and Sweden in their war against Napoleon. Austria played a major role in the final defeat of France – in recognition of this, Francis, represented by Clemens von Metternich, presided over the Congress of Vienna, helping to form the Concert of Europe and the Holy Alliance, ushering in an era of conservatism in Europe. The German Confederation, a loose association of Central European states, was created by the Congress of Vienna in 1815 to organise the surviving states of the Holy Roman Empire. The Congress was a personal triumph for Francis, who hosted the assorted dignitaries in comfort, though Francis undermined his allies Tsar Alexander I of Russia and Frederick William III of Prussia by negotiating a secret treaty with the restored French king Louis XVIII.

=== Domestic policy ===
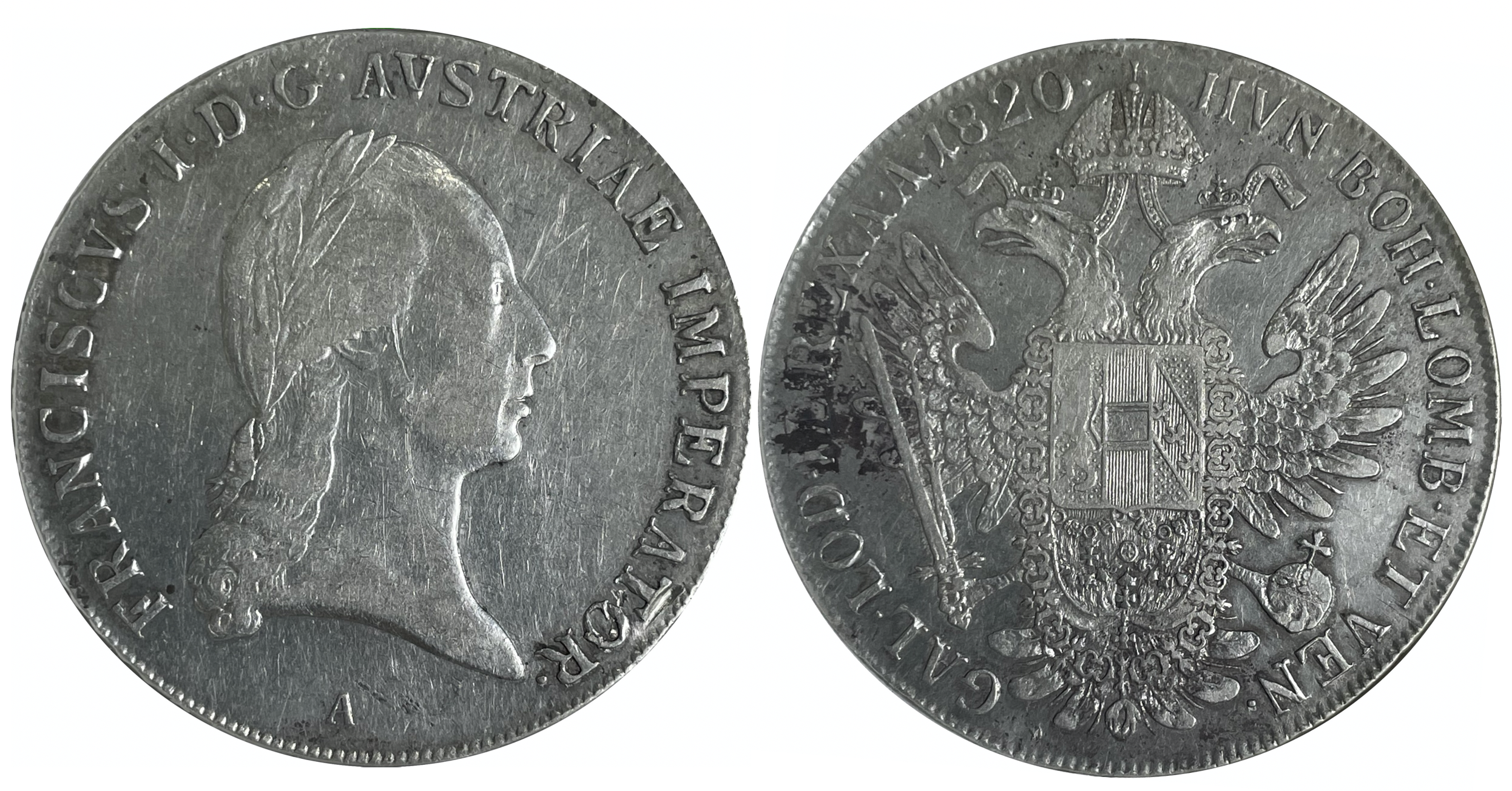
1 Thaler silver coin with portrait of Emperor Francis I, 1820

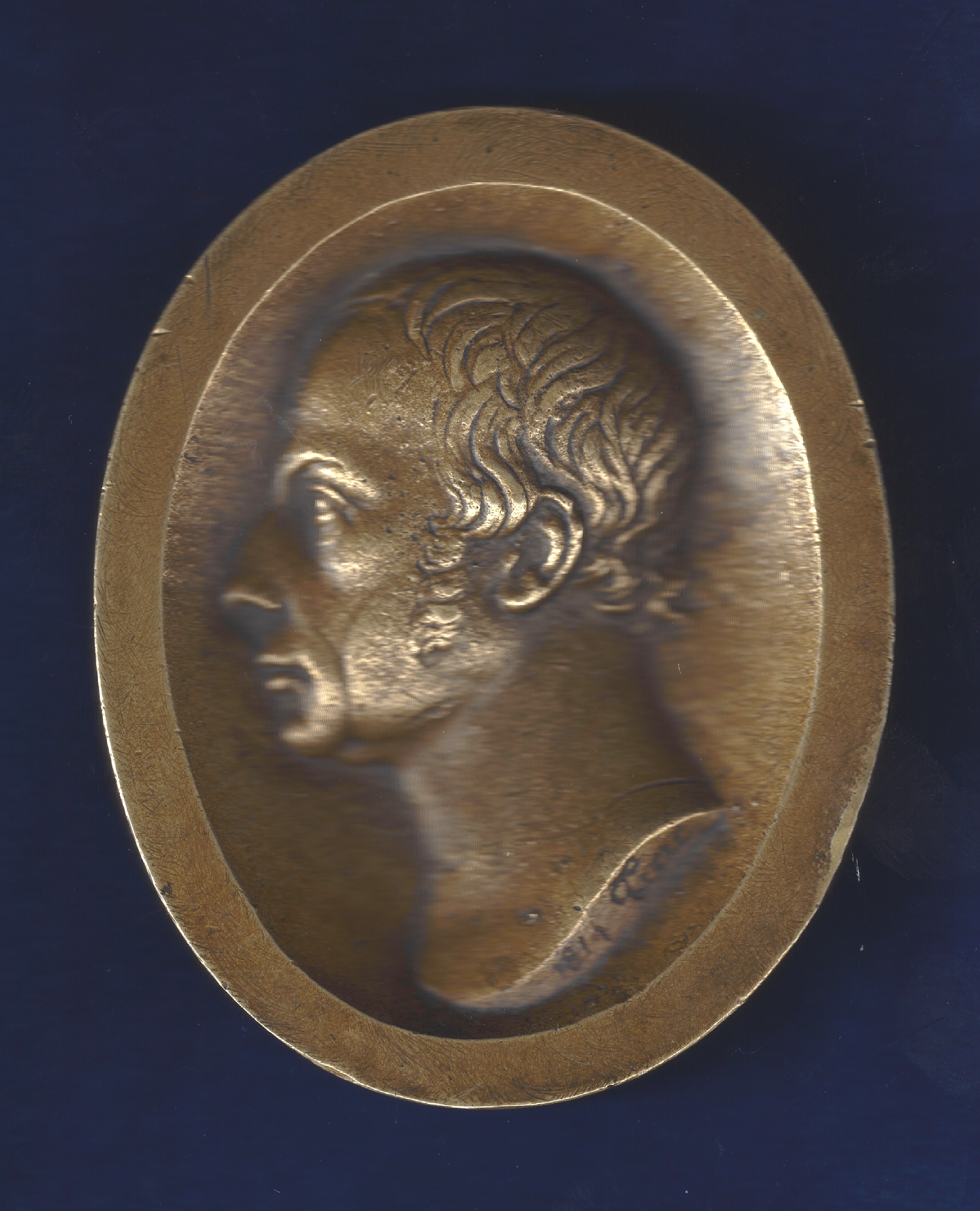
Medallion of Francis I, designed by Philipp Jakob Treu in Basel, Switzerland, on 13 January 1814. This was the date in the War of the Sixth Coalition when the allied monarchs of Austria, Prussia, and Russia crossed the Rhine at Basel into France.

The violent events of the French Revolution impressed themselves deeply into the mind of Francis (as well as the other European monarchs), and he came to distrust radicalism in any form. In 1794, a "Jacobin" conspiracy was discovered in the Austrian and Hungarian armies. The leaders were put on trial, but the verdicts only skirted the perimeter of the conspiracy. Francis's brother Archduke Alexander Leopold of Austria (at that time Palatine of Hungary) wrote to the Emperor admitting "Although we have caught a lot of the culprits, we have not really got to the bottom of this business yet." Nonetheless, two officers heavily implicated in the conspiracy were hanged and gibbeted, while numerous others were sentenced to imprisonment (many of whom died from the conditions).

Francis was, by his formative experiences, of a suspicious nature; he set up an extensive network of police spies and censors to monitor dissent (in this he was following his father's lead, as the Grand Duchy of Tuscany had the most effective secret police in Europe). Even his family did not escape scrutiny. His brothers, the Archdukes Charles, Duke of Teschen and Johann of Austria, had their meetings and activities spied upon. Censorship was also prevalent. The author Franz Grillparzer, a Habsburg patriot, had one play suppressed solely as a "precautionary" measure. When Grillparzer met the censor responsible, he asked him what was objectionable about the work. The censor replied, "Oh, nothing at all. But I thought to myself, One can never tell."

In military affairs, Francis had allowed his brother, the Archduke Charles, Duke of Teschen, extensive control over the army during the Napoleonic wars. Yet, distrustful of allowing any individual too much power, he otherwise maintained the separation of command functions between the Hofkriegsrat and his field commanders. In the later years of his reign, he limited military spending, requiring it not to exceed forty million florins per year; because of inflation, this resulted in inadequate funding, with the army's share of the budget shrinking from half in 1817 to only 23% in 1830.

Francis presented himself as an open and approachable monarch. He regularly set aside two mornings each week to meet with his imperial subjects, regardless of status, by appointment in his office, even speaking to them in their own language. Yet, it was never doubted that his will was sovereign. In 1804, he had no compunction about announcing that, through his authority as Holy Roman Emperor, he was now Emperor of Austria (at the time a geographical term that had little resonance). Two years later, Francis personally wound up the moribund Holy Roman Empire of the German Nation. Both actions were of dubious constitutional legality.

To increase patriotic sentiment during the war with France, the anthem "Gott erhalte Franz den Kaiser" was composed in 1797 to be sung as the Kaiserhymne (imperial anthem), set to music by Joseph Haydn. The lyrics were adapted for later Emperors; the music continues to be used as the German national anthem "Deutschlandlied".

== Death ==
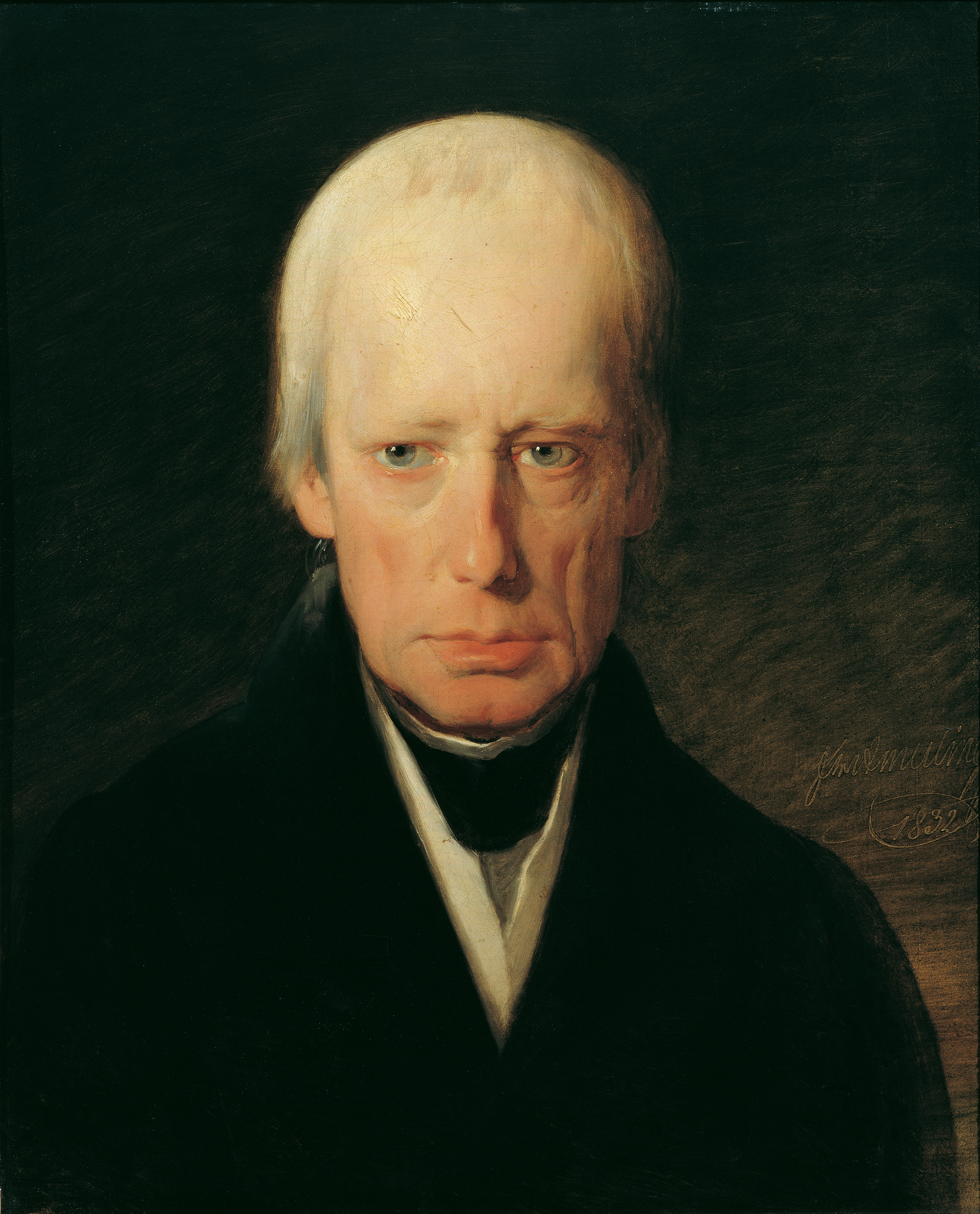
Portrait of an aging Francis II, by Friedrich von Amerling, c. 1832

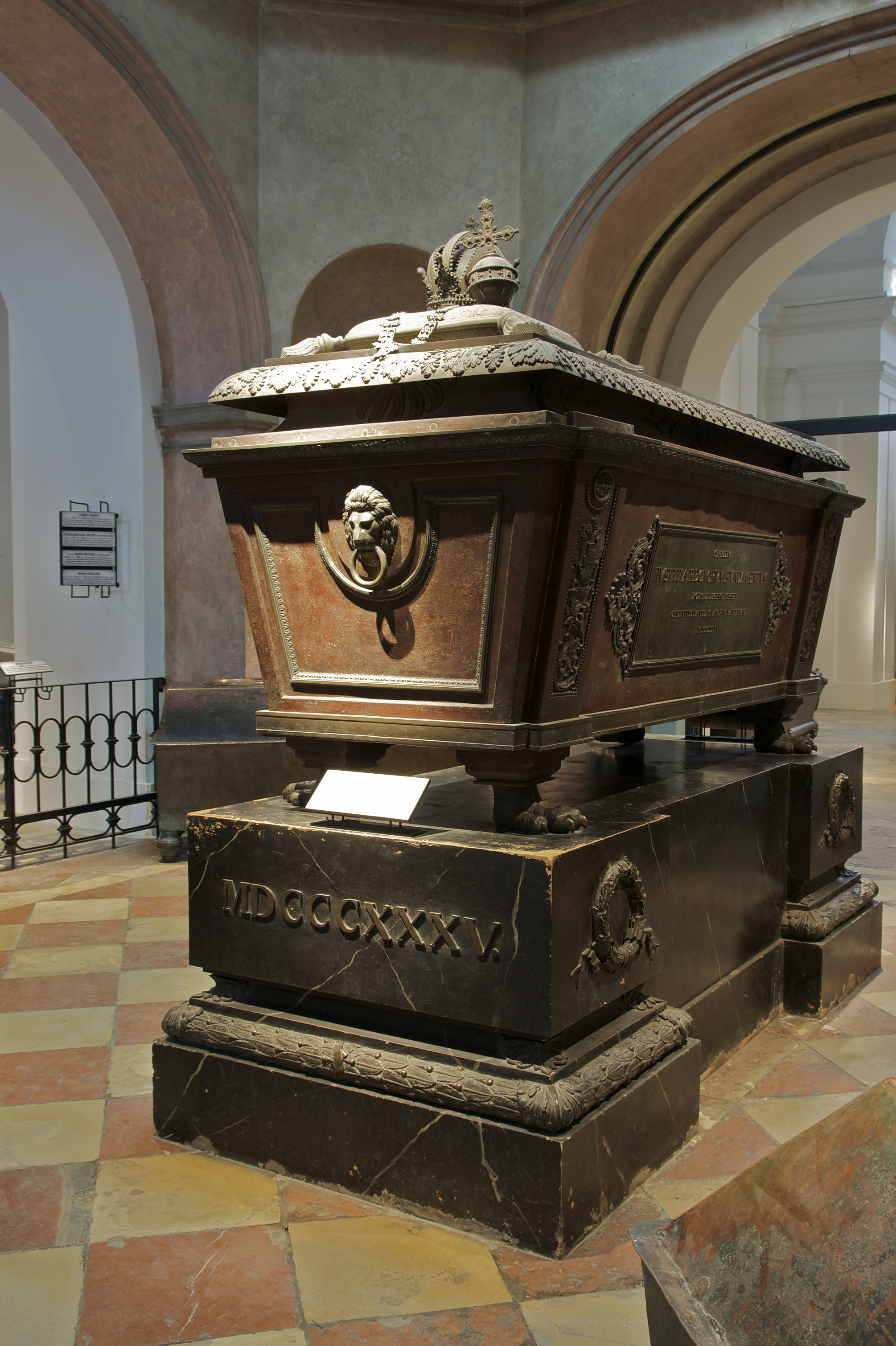
Sarcophagus of Francis II in the Imperial Crypt

On 2 March 1835, 43 years and a day after his father's death, Francis died in Vienna of a sudden fever at the age of 67, in the presence of many of his family and with religious comforts. His funeral was described as "magnificent", with his Viennese subjects viewing his coffin in the court chapel of the Hofburg palace for three days. Francis was interred in the traditional resting place of Habsburg monarchs, the Imperial Crypt in Vienna's Neue Markt Square. He is buried in tomb number 57, surrounded by the tombs of his four wives.

Francis passed on a main point in the political testament he left for his son and heir Ferdinand: to "preserve unity in the family and regard it as one of the highest goods." In many portraits (particularly those painted by Peter Fendi) he was portrayed as the patriarch of a loving family, surrounded by his children and grandchildren.

== Marriages ==
Francis II married on four occasions:

1. On 6 January 1788, to Duchess Elisabeth of Württemberg (21 April 1767 – 18 February 1790).
2. On 15 September 1790, to his double first cousin Maria Theresa of Naples and Sicily (6 June 1772 – 13 April 1807), daughter of King Ferdinand I of the Two Sicilies (both were grandchildren of Empress Maria Theresa and shared all of their other grandparents in common), with whom he had twelve children, of whom only seven reached adulthood.
3. On 6 January 1808, he married again to another first cousin, Maria Ludovika of Austria-Este (14 December 1787 – 7 April 1816) with no issue. She was the daughter of Ferdinand Karl, Archduke of Austria-Este and Maria Beatrice d'Este, Duchess of Massa, Princess of Modena.
4. On 29 October 1816, to Caroline Augusta of Bavaria (8 February 1792 – 9 February 1873) with no issue. She was the daughter of Maximilian I Joseph of Bavaria and had been previously married to William I of Württemberg.

== Children ==
From his first wife Elisabeth of Württemberg, one daughter, who died in infancy, and his second wife Maria Theresa of Naples and Sicily, eight daughters and four sons, of whom five died in infancy or childhood:

Children of Francis II
| Name | Picture | Birth | Death | Notes |
|---|---|---|---|---|
By Duchess Elisabeth of Württemberg:
| Archduchess Ludovika Elisabeth | | 18 February 1790 | 24 June 1791 (aged 1) | Died in infancy and buried in the Imperial Crypt, Vienna, Austria. |
By Maria Theresa of Naples and Sicily:
| Marie Louise, Duchess of Parma | | 12 December 1791 | 17 December 1847 (aged 56) | Married first Napoléon Bonaparte, had issue, married second Adam Adalbert von Neipperg, had issue, married third to Charles-René de Bombelles, Count of Bombelles, no issue. |
| Ferdinand I of Austria | | 19 April 1793 | 29 June 1875 (aged 82) | Married Maria Anna of Savoy, Princess of Sardinia, no issue. |
| Archduchess Marie Caroline | | 8 June 1794 | 16 March 1795 (aged 9 months) | Died in childhood, no issue. |
| Archduchess Caroline Ludovika | | 22 December 1795 | 30 June 1797 (aged 1) | Died in childhood, no issue. |
| Maria Leopoldina of Austria | | 22 January 1797 | 11 December 1826 (aged 29) | Renamed Maria Leopoldina upon her marriage; married Pedro I of Brazil (a.k.a. Pedro IV of Portugal); issue included Maria II of Portugal and Pedro II of Brazil. |
| Archduchess Clementina of Austria | | 1 March 1798 | 3 September 1881 (aged 83) | Married her maternal uncle Leopold, Prince of Salerno, had issue. |
| Archduke Joseph Franz of Austria | | 9 April 1799 | 30 June 1807 (aged 8) | Died some weeks after his mother in childhood, no issue. |
| Archduchess Marie Caroline of Austria | | 8 April 1801 | 22 May 1832 (aged 31) | Married Crown Prince (later King) Frederick Augustus II of Saxony, no issue. |
| Archduke Franz Karl of Austria | | 17 December 1802 | 8 March 1878 (aged 75) | Married Princess Sophie of Bavaria; issue included Franz Joseph I and Maximilian I of Mexico. |
| Archduchess Marie Anne of Austria | | 8 June 1804 | 28 December 1858 (aged 54) | Born intellectually disabled (like her eldest brother, Emperor Ferdinand I) and to have suffered from a severe facial deformity. Died unmarried. |
| Archduke Johann Nepomuk | | 30 August 1805 | 19 February 1809 (aged 3) | Died in childhood, no issue. |
| Archduchess Amalie Theresa | | 6 April 1807 | 9 April 1807 (aged 3 days) | Died in childhood, no issue. |

== Titles, honours and heraldry ==
Monarchical styles of Ferenc I of Hungary
- Reference style: His Apostolic Majesty
- Spoken style: Your Apostolic Majesty

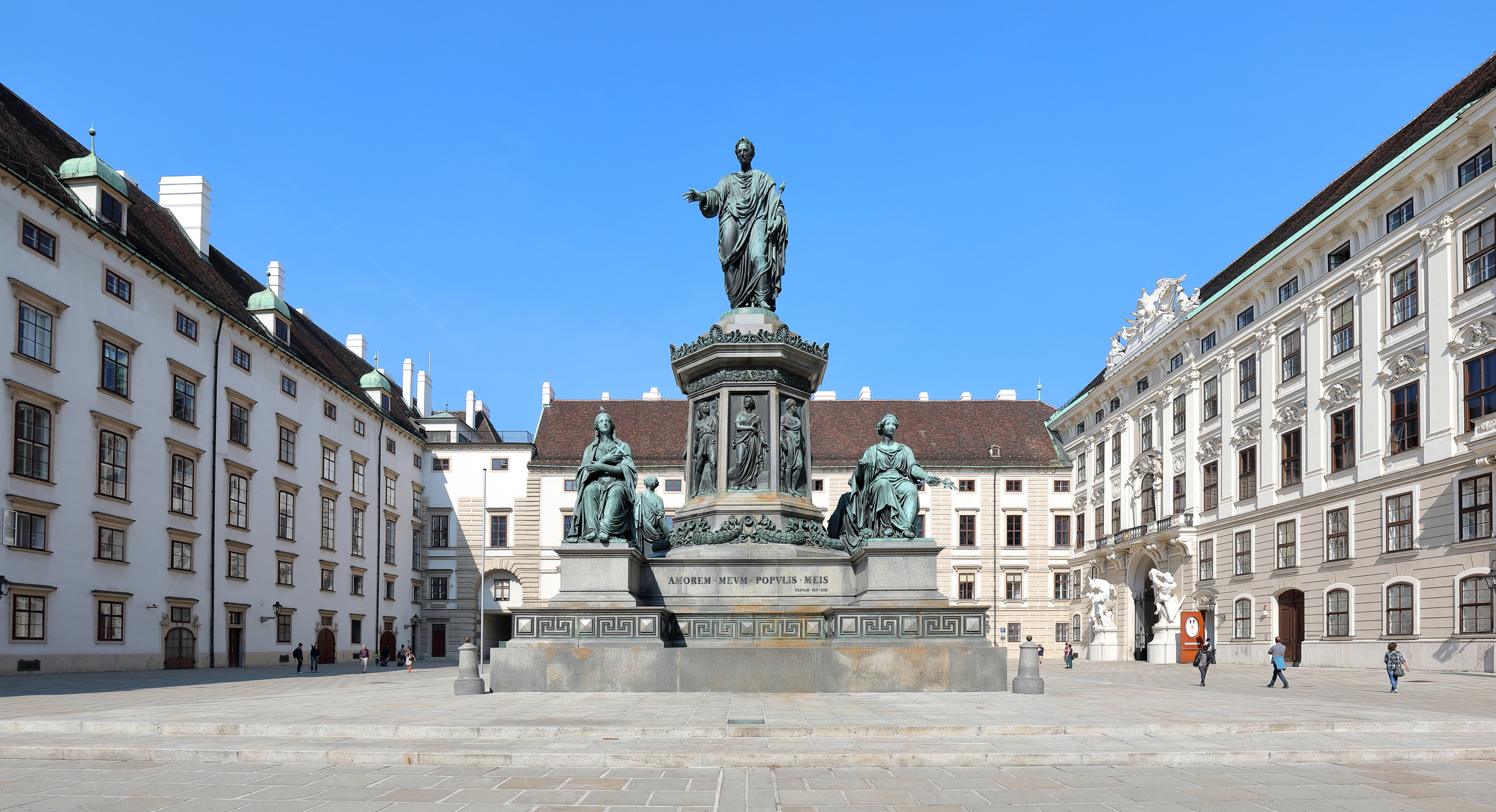
Monument in the inner courtyard of the Hofburg in Vienna, showing him as the last Roman Imperator, in a pose similar to the Augustus of Prima Porta statue

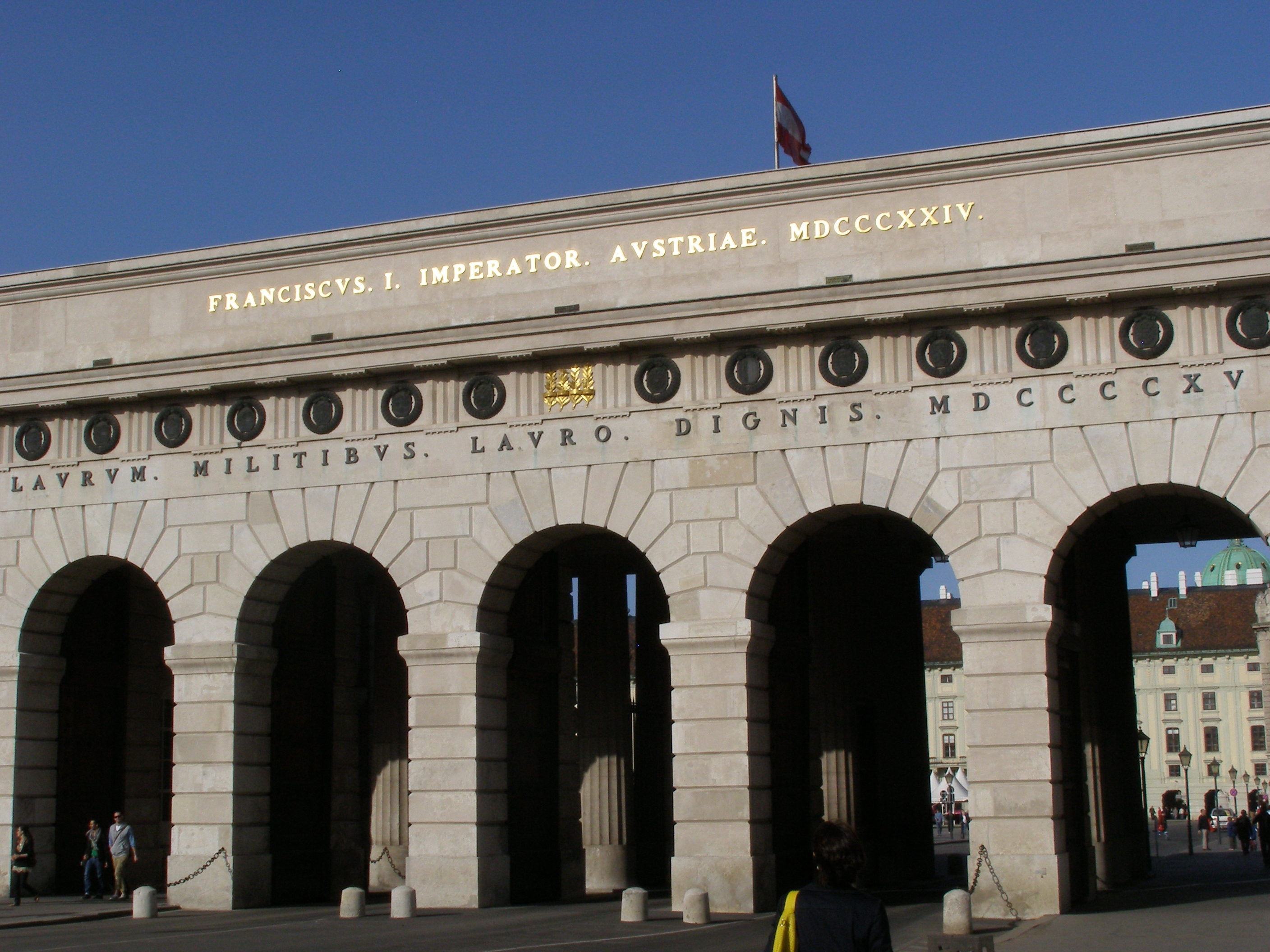
Golden dedication inscription at the Äusseres Burgtor of the Hofburg Palace in Vienna of "FRANCISCUS I. IMPERATOR AUSTRIAE MDCCCXXIV" (Francis I. Emperor of Austria 1824)

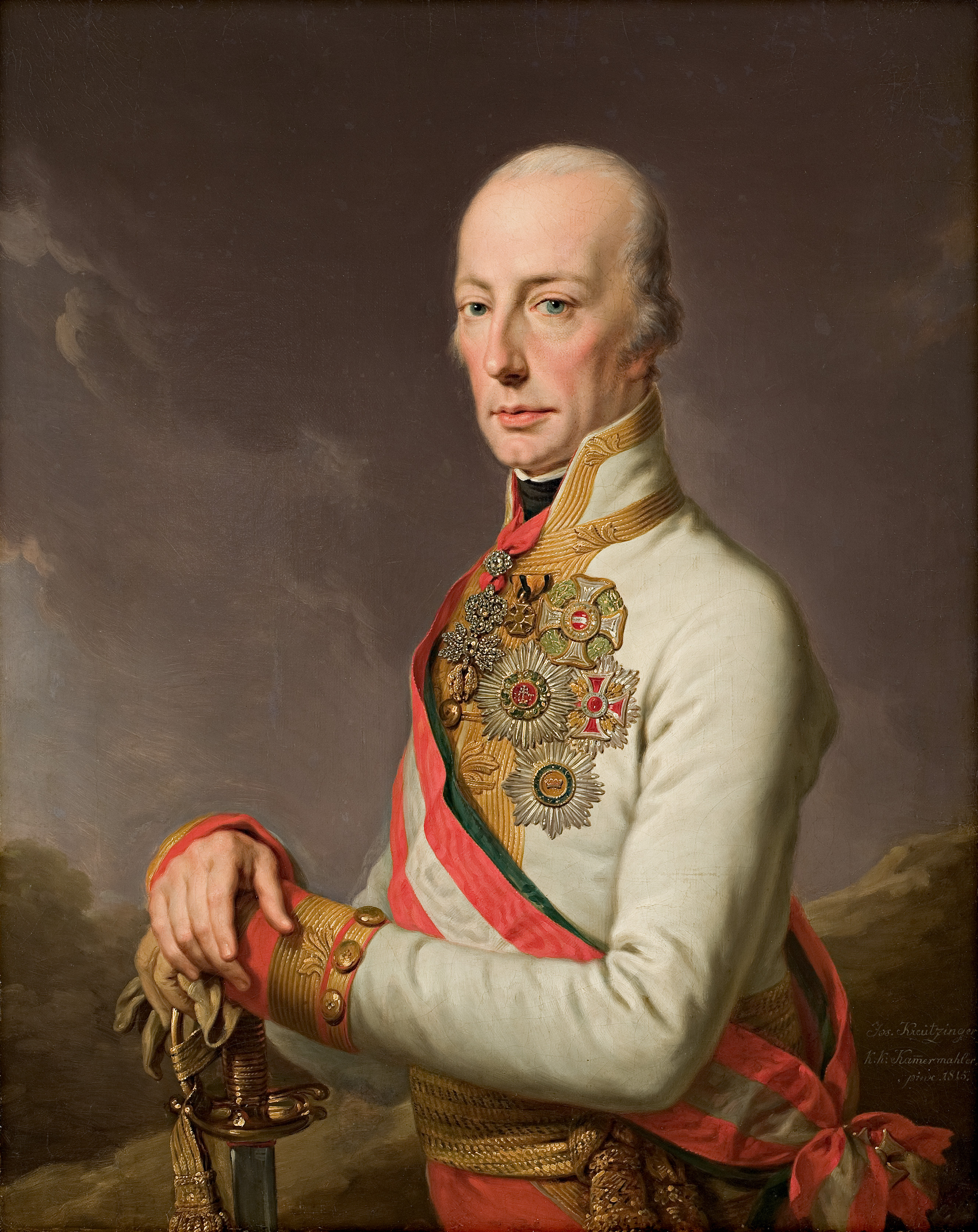
The emperor wearing a number of orders and decoration such as the Golden Fleece, Order of Maria Theresa, Order of Leopold, Order of Saint Stephen, and others (portrait by Joseph Kreutzinger, c. 1815)

=== Titles ===
From 1806 he used the Grand title of the emperor of Austria:

His Imperial and Royal Apostolic Majesty,
Francis the First
By the Grace of God Emperor of Austria,
King of Hungary, Bohemia, Lombardy–Venetia, Dalmatia, Croatia, Slavonia, Galicia, Lodomeria and Illyria;
King of Jerusalem, etc.;
Archduke of Austria;
Grand Duke of Tuscany;
Duke of Lorraine, Salzburg, Styria, Carinthia, Carniola and Bukovina;
Grand Prince of Transylvania, Margrave of Moravia;
Duke of Upper and Lower Silesia, of Modena, Parma, Piacenza and Guastalla, of Auschwitz and Zator, of Teschen, Friaul, Ragusa and Zara;
Princely Count of Habsburg and Tyrol, of Kyburg, Gorizia and Gradisca;
Prince of Trento and Brixen;
Margrave of Upper and Lower Lusatia and in Istria;
Count of Hohenems, Feldkirch, Bregenz, Sonnenberg, etc.;
Lord of Trieste, of Cattaro and on the Windic March;
Grand Voivode of the Voivodeship of Serbia;
etc.

From 1804, with the proclamation of the Empire of Austria until his abdication as Holy Roman Emperor in 1806, his grand title started "By the Grace of God anointed Roman Emperor, ever Increaser of the Realm and King in Germania ("von Gottes Gnaden erwählter Römischer Kaiser, zu allen Zeiten Mehrer des Reichs sowie König in Germanien).

=== Orders and decorations ===
- Habsburg monarchy:
  - Knight of the Golden Fleece, 1768
  - Grand Cross of the Military Order of Maria Theresa, 1790
  - Founder and Grand Master of the Imperial Order of Leopold, 8 January 1808
  - Founder and Grand Master of the Order of the Iron Crown, 1815
- France:
  - French Empire: Grand Eagle of the Legion of Honour, 1811
  - Kingdom of France: Knight of the Holy Spirit, 1815
- Kingdom of Bavaria: Knight of St. Hubert, 1813
- Sweden: Grand Cross of the Sword, 1st Class, 20 February 1814
- United Kingdom: Stranger Knight of the Garter, 9 June 1814
- Denmark: Knight of the Elephant, 12 November 1814
- Kingdom of Portugal: Grand Cross of the Sash of the Three Orders, 1818
- Two Sicilies:
  - Knight of St. Januarius, 1821
  - Grand Cross of St. Ferdinand and Merit
- Kingdom of Sardinia: Knight of the Annunciation, 3 January 1824
- Russian Empire:
  - Knight of St. Andrew, 13 March 1826
  - Knight of St. Alexander Nevsky, 13 March 1826
- Empire of Brazil:
  - Grand Cross of the Order of Pedro I, 1827
  - Grand Cross of the Southern Cross, 1830
- Baden:
  - Grand Cross of the House Order of Fidelity, 1830
  - Grand Cross of the Zähringer Lion, 1830
- Grand Duchy of Tuscany: Grand Cross of St. Joseph

=== Heraldry ===
| Middle Coat of arms as Holy Roman Emperor (1792–1804) | Greater Coat of arms as Holy Roman Emperor (1792–1804) | Greater Coat of arms (Shield variant) (1792–1804) | Greater Coat of arms (Shield variant with supporters) (1792–1804) |

| Middle Coat of arms as Holy Roman Emperor and Emperor of Austria (1804–1806) | Greater Coat of arms as Holy Roman Emperor and Emperor of Austria (1804–1806) | Lesser Coat of arms as Emperor of Austria (1815–1835) | Middle Coat of arms as Emperor of Austria (1815–1835) |

== Ancestors ==
Ancestors of Francis II, Holy Roman Emperor

8. Leopold, Duke of Lorraine
4. Francis I, Holy Roman Emperor
9. Élisabeth Charlotte d'Orléans
2. Leopold II, Holy Roman Emperor
10. Charles VI, Holy Roman Emperor
5. Maria Theresa of Austria
11. Elisabeth Christine of Brunswick-Wolfenbüttel
1. Francis II, Holy Roman Emperor
12. Philip V of Spain
6. Charles III of Spain
13. Elisabeth Farnese
3. Maria Luisa of Spain
14. Augustus III of Poland
7. Maria Amalia of Saxony
15. Maria Josepha of Austria

== See also ==
- Family tree of the German monarchs

== Bibliography ==
- Fraser, Antonia (2002). Marie Antoinette: The Journey. London: Phoenix. ISBN 0-7538-1305-X.
- Posse, Otto, ed. (1909–1913). "Bey der Niederlegung der kaiserlichen Reichs-Regierung. Dekret vom 6 August 1806". Die Siegel der deutschen Kaiser und Könige von 751 bis 1806 (in German). Band 5, Beilage 3. OCLC 42197429 – via Wikisource.
- Rothenburg, Gunther E. (1976). The Army of Francis Joseph. West Lafayette, Ind.: Purdue University Press. ISBN 0911198415.
- Wheatcroft, Andrew (1996). The Habsburgs: Embodying Empire. London: Penguin Books. ISBN 0-14-023634-1.

== Regnal titles ==
Francis II, Holy Roman Emperor House of Habsburg-Lorraine Cadet branch of the House of Lorraine Born: 12 February 1768 Died: 2 March 1835
Regnal titles
| Preceded by Leopold II, Holy Roman Emperor | Holy Roman Emperor; King in Germany; 1792 – 1806 | Dissolution |
| Preceded by Leopold II, Holy Roman Emperor | Duke of Brabant, Limburg and Luxembourg; Count of Flanders, Hainaut and Namur; 1792 – 1793 | French Revolutionary Wars |
| Preceded by Leopold II, Holy Roman Emperor | Duke of Milan; 1792 – 1796 | French Revolutionary Wars |
| Preceded by Leopold II, Holy Roman Emperor | King of Hungary, Bohemia, Galicia and Lodomeria, and Croatia, Archduke of Austria; 1792 – 1835 | Succeeded by Ferdinand I and V |
| New title | Emperor of Austria; 1804 – 1835 | Succeeded by Ferdinand I and V |
| New title | King of Lombardy-Venetia; 1815 – 1835 | Succeeded by Ferdinand I and V |
Political offices
| New title | Head of the Präsidialmacht Austria; 1815 – 1835 | Succeeded by Ferdinand I of Austria |
