= Archduke Joseph Franz of Austria =

Child of Francis II

Archduke Joseph Franz
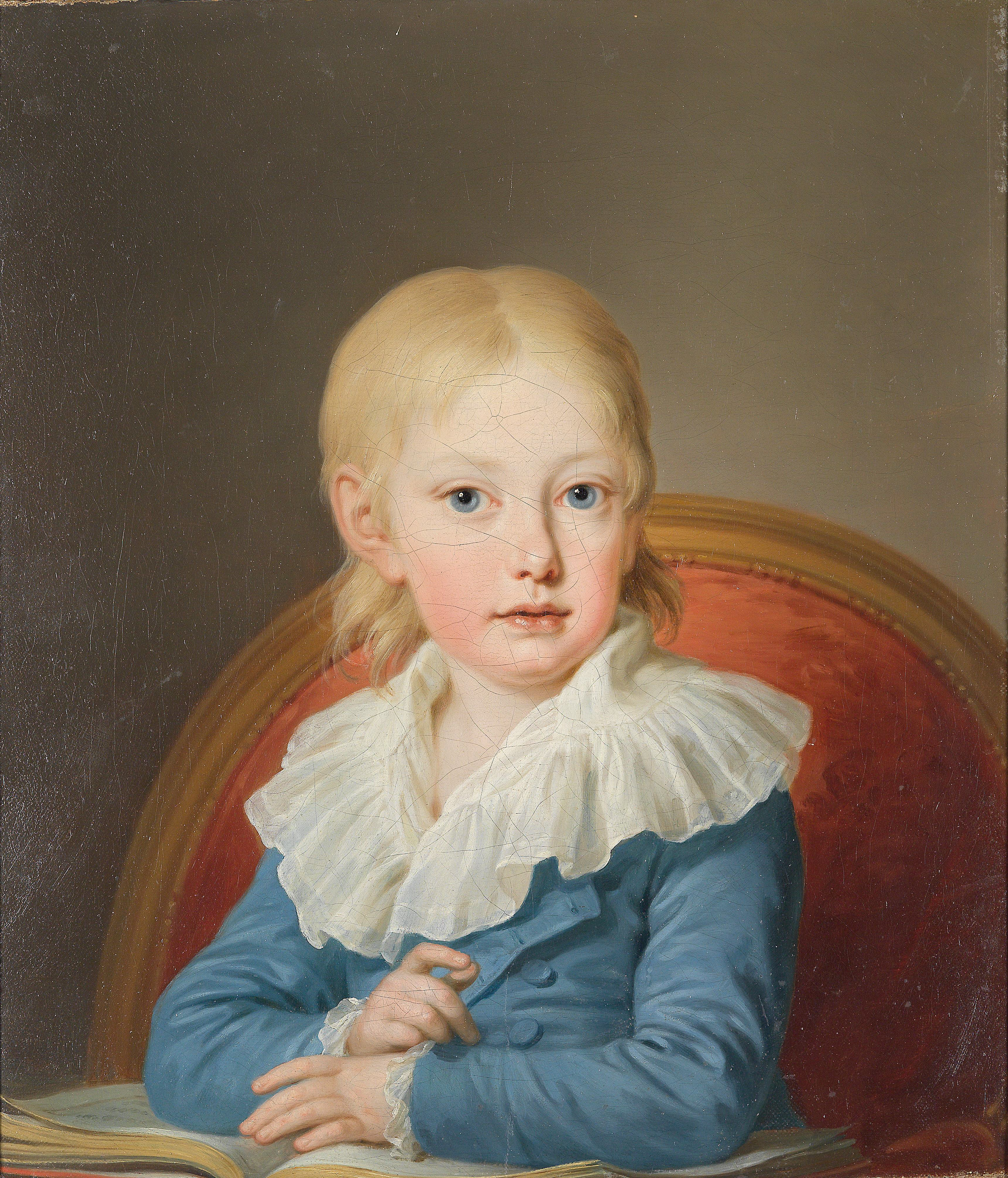
- Portrait, c. 1806–07
- Born: 9 April 1799; Hofburg Imperial Palace, Vienna, Archduchy of Austria
- Died: 30 June 1807 (aged 8); Hofburg Imperial Palace, Vienna, Austrian Empire
- Burial: Capuchin Church, Vienna
Names
- German: Joseph Franz Leopold; English: Joseph Francis Leopold
- House: Habsburg-Lorraine
- Father: Francis II, Holy Roman Emperor
- Mother: Maria Theresa of Naples and Sicily

Archduke Joseph Franz Leopold of Austria (9 April 1799 – 30 June 1807) was the second son and seventh child of Francis II, the last Holy Roman Emperor and his second wife, Maria Theresa of Naples and Sicily. He was their fourth child to die.

== Biography ==
Archduke Joseph Franz with his younger brother Archduke Franz Karl and their father Francis II, Holy Roman Emperor

Archduke Joseph Franz, ca. 1801/2

Archduke Joseph Franz was born at the Hofburg Imperial Palace, where all of his siblings were born. Joseph's mother Maria Theresa died on 13 April 1807 after giving birth to a short-lived daughter, Amalie.

He was a lively child and one of the favourite children of his mother and possibly even his father.

On 30 June 1807, approximately six weeks after the death of his mother, the eight-year-old Archduke died at the Hofburg Palace of either yellow fever or smallpox, though yellow fever seems to be the most acceptable, as the outbreak was in the United States in 1803 and most of the American plagues extended to Europe in a matter of two to four years.

Joseph Franz was buried at the Capuchin Church in Vienna, more specifically in the Imperial Crypt (his heart is buried in the Herzgruft chamber), the burial place of his family.

== Ancestry ==
Ancestors of Archduke Joseph Franz of Austria

8. Francis I, Holy Roman Emperor (= 14)
4. Leopold II, Holy Roman Emperor
9. Maria Theresa of Austria (= 15)
2. Francis II, Holy Roman Emperor
10. Charles III of Spain (= 12)
5. Maria Luisa of Spain
11. Maria Amalia of Saxony (= 13)
1. Archduke Joseph Franz of Austria
12. Charles III of Spain (= 10)
6. Ferdinand I of the Two Sicilies
13. Maria Amalia of Saxony (= 11)
3. Maria Theresa of Naples and Sicily
14. Francis I, Holy Roman Emperor (= 8)
7. Maria Carolina of Austria
15. Maria Theresa of Austria (= 9)
