= Archduchess Marie Caroline of Austria =

Crown Princess of Saxony

Marie Caroline of Austria
- Crown Princess of Saxony
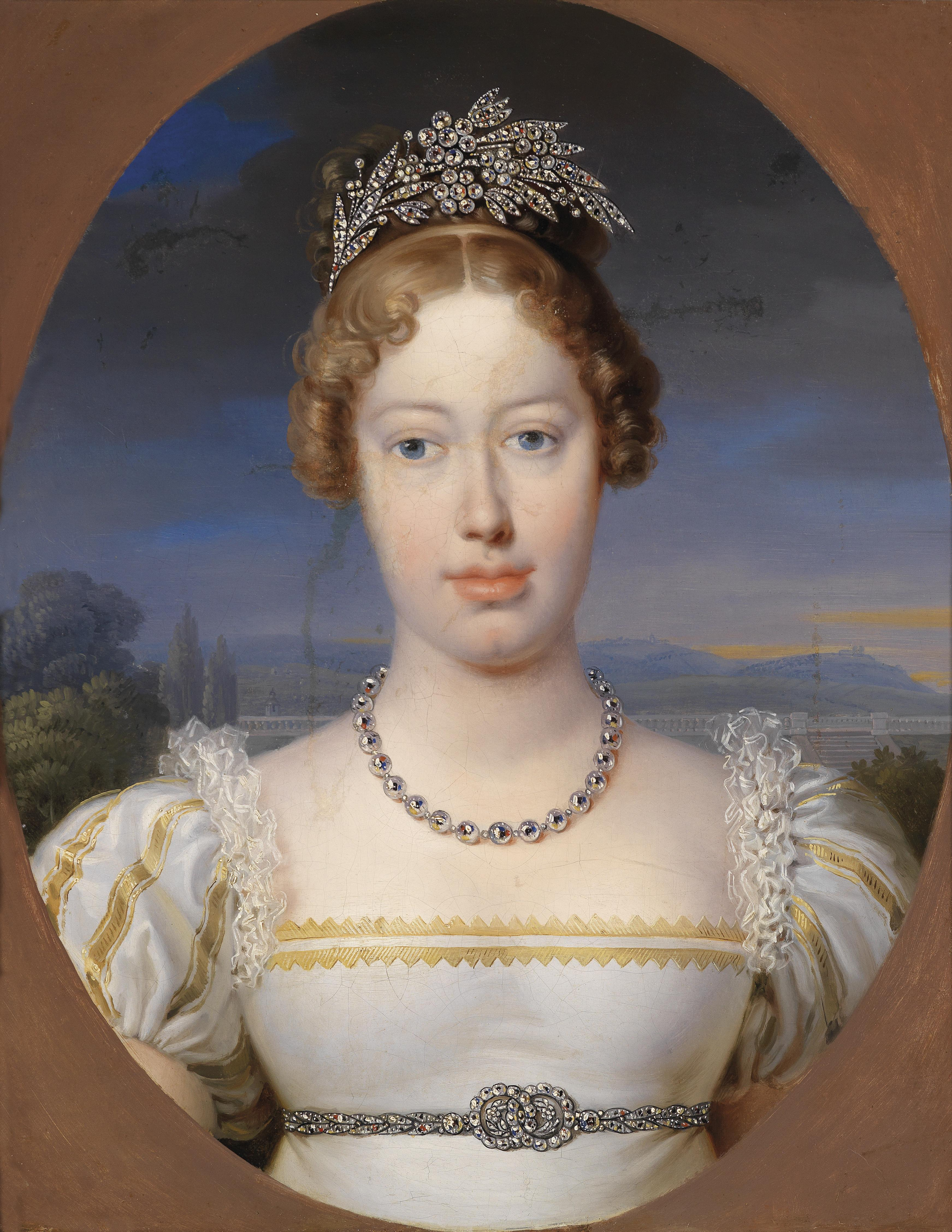
- Portrait by Johann Peter Krafft, 1817
- Born: 8 April 1801; Hofburg Palace, Vienna, Archduchy of Austria, Holy Roman Empire
- Died: 22 May 1832 (aged 31); Pillnitz Castle, Dresden, Kingdom of Saxony
- Burial: Katholische Hofkirche
- Spouse: Frederick Augustus, Crown Prince of Saxony (later Frederick Augustus II) (m. 1819)
Names
- German: Maria Carolina Ferdinanda Theresia Josepha Demetria
- House: Habsburg-Lorraine
- Father: Francis II, Holy Roman Emperor
- Mother: Maria Theresa of Naples and Sicily

Archduchess Marie Carolina Ferdinanda of Austria (8 April 1801 – 22 May 1832) was Crown Princess of Saxony as the wife of Frederick Augustus, Crown Prince of Saxony.

== Life ==
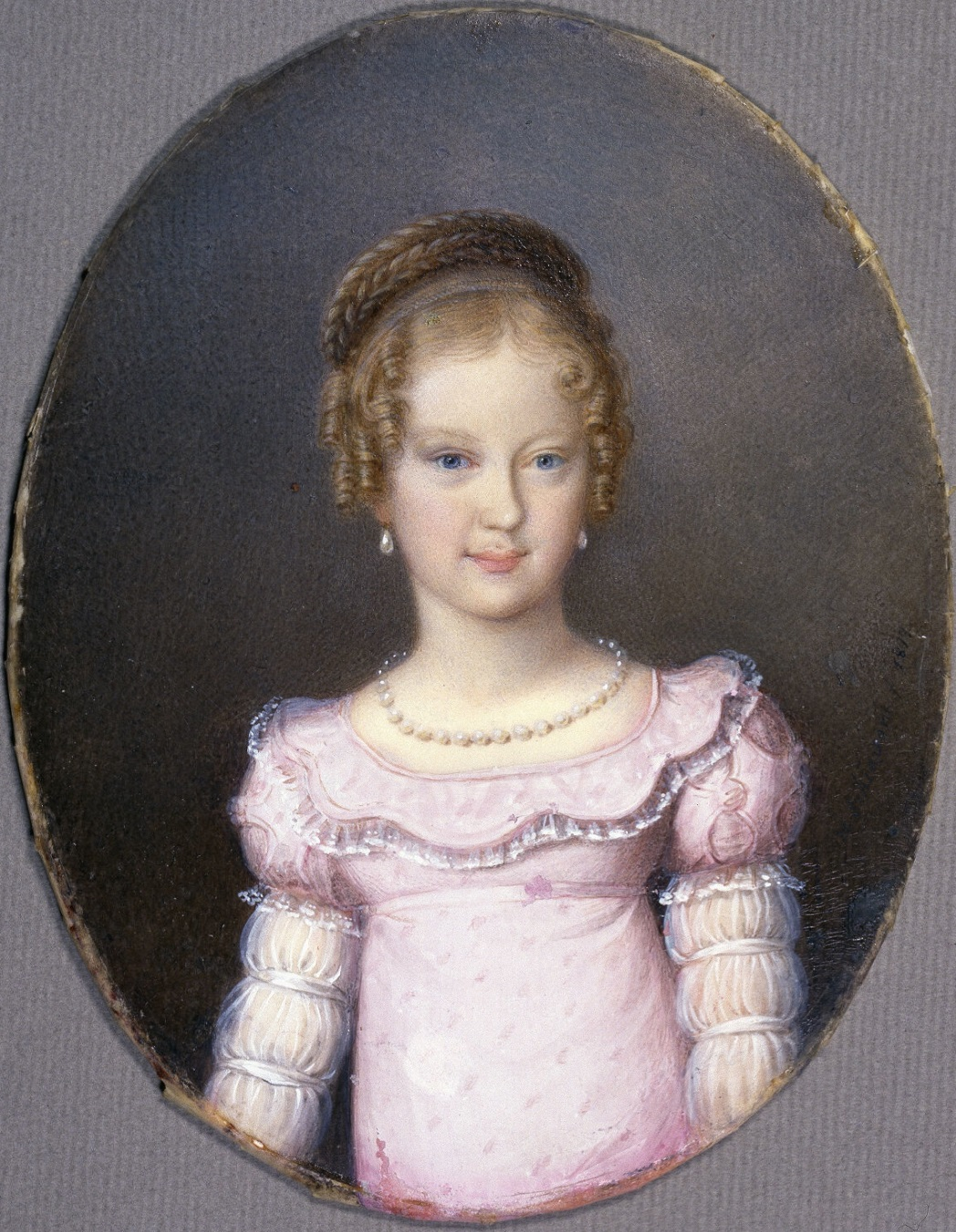
Marie Caroline as a teenager

Marie Caroline was a daughter of Francis II, Holy Roman Emperor, later Francis I of Austria after the dissolution of the Holy Roman Empire, and Maria Teresa of the Two Sicilies, and named after an elder sister who had died in infancy. Marie Caroline's parents were double first cousins as they shared all four grandparents (Francis' paternal grandparents were his wife's maternal grandparents and vice versa).

She was educated strictly, standing out in drawing, as proven by several sketches and crayons preserved in Austria.

=== Crown Princess of Saxony ===
Portrait of Caroline in the year of her marriage, by Adalbert Suchy, c. 1819

On 7 October 1819 she married Prince Frederick Augustus of Saxony, son of Maximilian, Prince of Saxony, and Princess Caroline of Parma, in Dresden, Germany. The marriage was childless and unhappy.

Marie Caroline was sweet and pleasant, but she experienced epilepsy and her attacks were so frequent that she was barely able to fulfill her duties as Crown Princess; they also seriously affected her marital relationship. Frederick Augustus was unfaithful on several occasions. From one of these affairs he had an illegitimate son, the musician Theodor Uhlig (1822–1853).

Maria Carolina died from an epileptic attack on 22 May 1832 at Pillnitz Castle near Dresden.

== Ancestry ==
Ancestors of Archduchess Marie Caroline of Austria

8. Francis I, Holy Roman Emperor (= 14)
4. Leopold II, Holy Roman Emperor
9. Maria Theresa of Austria (= 15)
2. Francis II, Holy Roman Emperor
10. Charles III of Spain (= 12)
5. Maria Luisa of Spain
11. Maria Amalia of Saxony (= 13)
1. Archduchess Marie Caroline of Austria
12. Charles III of Spain (= 10)
6. Ferdinand I of the Two Sicilies
13. Maria Amalia of Saxony (= 11)
3. Maria Theresa of Naples and Sicily
14. Francis I, Holy Roman Emperor (= 8)
7. Maria Carolina of Austria
15. Maria Theresa of Austria (= 9)
