= July Medal =

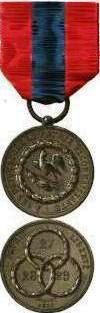

The July Medal was one of two French honorary decorations planned by Louis-Philippe I to honour those who had helped overthrow Charles X of France during the Trois Glorieuses (27–29 July) and establish the July Monarchy. The other was the July Cross.

It was set up by an ordinance of 13 May 1831 to reward "citizens who accomplished acts of courage during these days but whose devotion to the cause of Liberty did not justify the July Cross". The medal was sent to 3,763 people, each with a diploma. Unlike the July Cross, the winners of the July Medal had not taken the oath to Louis-Philippe and the Charter. It was a round silver medal 35mm in diameter. The obverse shows a Gallic cockerel on a flag surrounded by the inscription "À SES DÉFENSEURS LA PATRIE RECONNAISSANTE" (to its defenders, the fatherland recognises them). On the reverse are inscribed the dates 27, 28 and 29 inside three laurel wreaths, surrounded by the motto "PATRIE LIBERTÉ" (liberated fatherland) and surmounted by "JUILLET 1830" (July 1830). On the medal's edge is inscribed "DONNÉ PAR LE ROI DES FRANÇAIS" (given by the king of the French).
