= Order of the Cross of July =

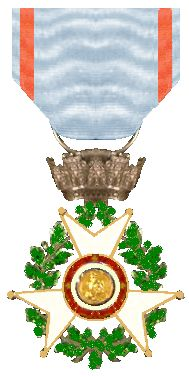
- The cross of the order
- Type: Order of Merit
- Presented by: King of the French
- Eligibility: those which had helped to overthrow Charles X
- Status: Defunct since 1848
- Established: December 13, 1830
- The ribbon of the order

Precedence
- Next (higher): Legion of Honour

The Order of the Cross of July (French: Ordre de la Croix de Juillet) was a French Order of Merit. It was created on December 13, 1830 by King Louis-Philippe I to thank those who had helped overthrow Charles X and establish a Constitutional monarchy. The order was intended to reward the citizens who were distinguished during the 'Glorious Three Days' (27, 28 and July 29, 1830). It included two decorations: the Cross of July and the July Medal.

== History ==
The enabling law envisaged the creation of a special decoration from which the members would profit from the Order. This decoration was created by the ordinance of 30 April 1831 under the name of the Order of the Cross of July.

It was intended for "those which were characterized by their devotion to the cause of Freedom". The citizens decorated with the Cross of July took an oath of fidelity to the King and an oath of obedience to the constitutional charter and the kingdom's laws. Military honors were given to the holders of the Cross of July as well as to those of the Légion of Honor.

A commission of the national awards, chaired by General Fabvier, decreed the awarding of 1,789 crosses, including more than 300 to soldiers.

== Design ==
The Cross is made up of a silver star with three enameled white branches, with the points pommetées and surmounted by a mural crown. The center of the star, formed by a gold medallion, is surrounded by an enameled crown of green oak leaves. The avers, the central medallion, is divided into three aureoles painted with the national colors, and has a French cockerel on the bottom gilded in blue aureole and the words PATRIE ET FREEDOM in red aureole. On the reverse, the central medallion is divided into three aureoles enameled with the national colors. The dates July 27, July 28, and July 29 are on the blue aureole, the year 1830 is on the white aureole and the words GIVEN BY THE ROI FRANCAIS in the red aureole.

== Notable recipients ==
Recipients of the Cross of July include François-Vincent Raspail, Alexandre Dumas, the general Lafayette, Adolphe Thiers and François Arago.
