= Louis Philippe I =

King of the French from 1830 to 1848

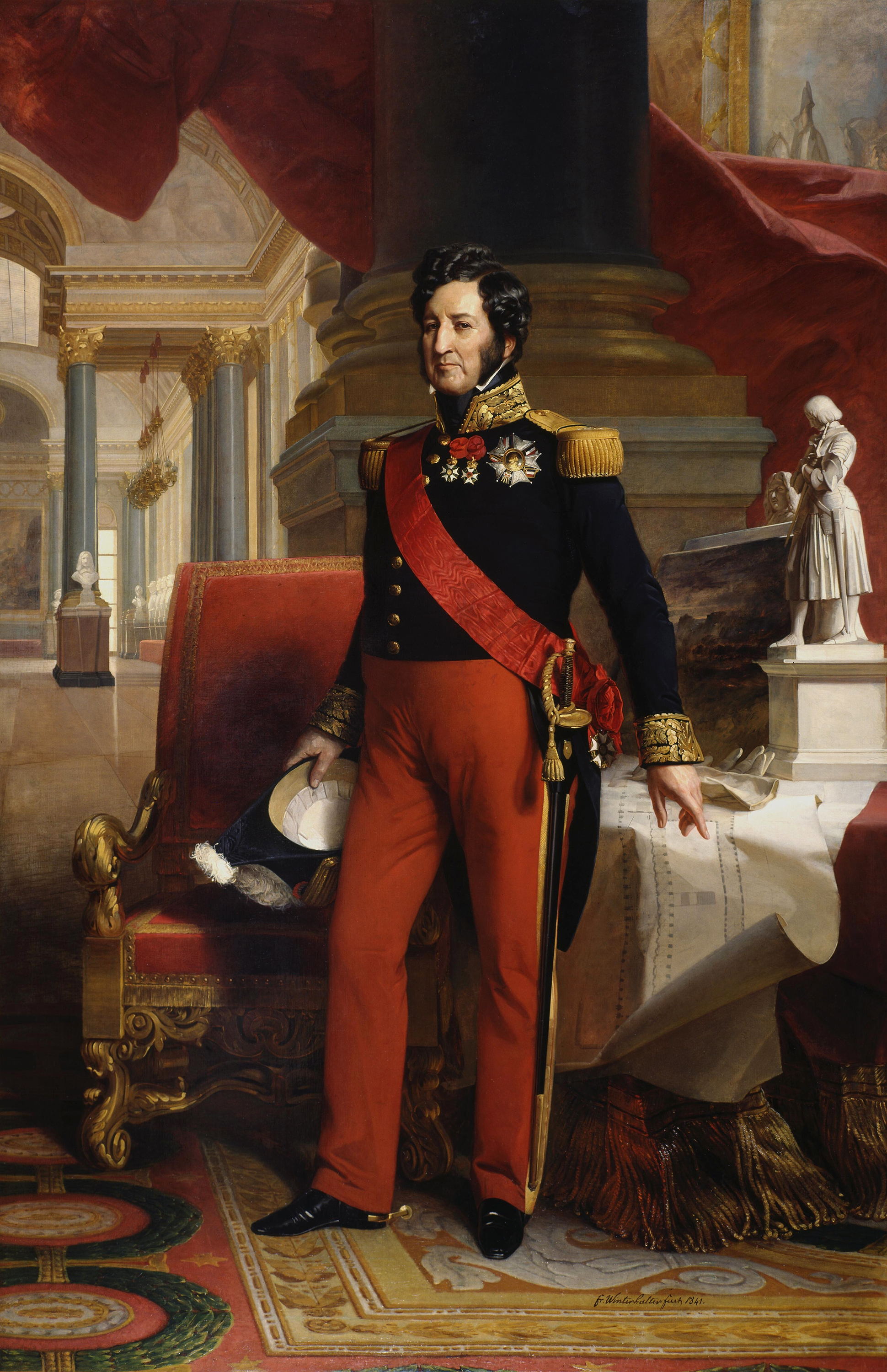
- Portrait of Louis Philippe I (1841)

King of the French
- Reign: 9 August 1830 – 24 February 1848
- Proclamation: 9 August 1830
- Predecessor: Charles X of France; Louis XIX (not proclaimed); Henry V (not proclaimed)
- Successor: Louis Philippe II
- Prime ministers: See list: Himself (1830); Jacques Laffitte (1830–1831); Casimir Pierre Périer (1831–1832); The Duke of Dalmatia (1832–1834); Étienne Maurice Gérard (1834–1834); The Duke of Bassano (1834–1834); The Duke of Trévise (1834–1835); The Duke of Broglie (1835–1836); Adolphe Thiers (1836–1836); Louis-Mathieu Molé (1836–1839); The Duke of Dalmatia (1839–1840); Adolphe Thiers (1840–1840); The Duke of Dalmatia (1840–1847); François Guizot (1847–1848); Louis-Mathieu Molé (1848–1848)

Lieutenant-General of the Realm
- In office 1 August 1830 – 11 August 1830
- Preceded by: Charles Philippe, Count of Artois
- Succeeded by: Position abolished

Prime Minister of France
- In office 1 August 1830 – 2 November 1830
- Monarchs: Charles X Himself
- Preceded by: Casimir de Rochechouart
- Succeeded by: Jacques Laffitte
- Born: 6 October 1773; Palais-Royal, Paris, France
- Died: 26 August 1850 (aged 76); Claremont, Surrey, England
- Burial: St. Charles Borromeo Chapel, Weybridge (1850–1876); Chapelle royale de Dreux (since 1876)
- Spouse: Maria Amalia of Naples and Sicily (m. 1809)
- Issue see detail...: Prince Ferdinand Philippe, Duke of Orléans; Louise, Queen of the Belgians; Marie, Duchess Alexander of Württemberg; Prince Louis, Duke of Nemours; Clémentine, Princess of Saxe-Coburg and Gotha-Koháry; François, Prince of Joinville; Prince Charles, Duke of Penthièvre; Prince Henri, Duke of Aumale; Prince Antoine, Duke of Montpensier
- House: Bourbon-Orléans
- Father: Louis Philippe II, Duke of Orléans
- Mother: Louise Marie Adélaïde de Bourbon
- Military career
- Allegiance: Kingdom of France; French First Republic
- Branch: French Army
- Service years: 1785–1793
- Rank: Lieutenant general
- Commands: Governor of Strasbourg; 4th Brigade of the Army of the North; 14th Dragoons Regiment
- Conflicts: French Revolutionary Wars; Battle of Valmy; Battle of Jemappes; Battle of Neerwinden

Louis Philippe I (6 October 1773 – 26 August 1850), nicknamed the Citizen King, was King of the French from 1830 to 1848, the penultimate monarch of France, the last French monarch to bear the title "King", and the only French monarch to descend from the Orléans branch of the Bourbon family. He abdicated from his throne during the French Revolution of 1848, which led to the foundation of the French Second Republic.

Louis Philippe was the eldest son of Louis Philippe II, Duke of Orléans (later known as Philippe Égalité). As Duke of Chartres, the younger Louis Philippe distinguished himself commanding troops during the French Revolutionary Wars and was promoted to lieutenant general by the age of 19, but broke with the French First Republic over its decision to execute King Louis XVI. He fled to Switzerland in 1793 after being connected with a plot to restore France's monarchy. His father fell under suspicion and was executed during the Reign of Terror.

Louis Philippe remained in exile for 21 years until the Bourbon Restoration. He was proclaimed king in 1830 after his distant cousin Charles X was forced to abdicate by the July Revolution. The reign of Louis Philippe is known as the July Monarchy and was dominated by wealthy industrialists and bankers. During the 1840–1848 period, he followed conservative policies, especially under the influence of French statesman François Guizot. He also promoted friendship with the United Kingdom and sponsored colonial expansion, notably the French conquest of Algeria. His popularity faded as economic conditions in France deteriorated in 1847, and he was forced to abdicate after the outbreak of the French Revolution of 1848.

Louis Philippe lived for the remainder of his life in exile in the United Kingdom. Among supporters of royalism in France, his supporters are known as Orléanists. Among his grandchildren were King Leopold II of Belgium, Empress Carlota of Mexico, Tsar Ferdinand I of Bulgaria, and Queen Mercedes of Spain.

== Before the Revolution (1773–1789) ==
=== Early life ===
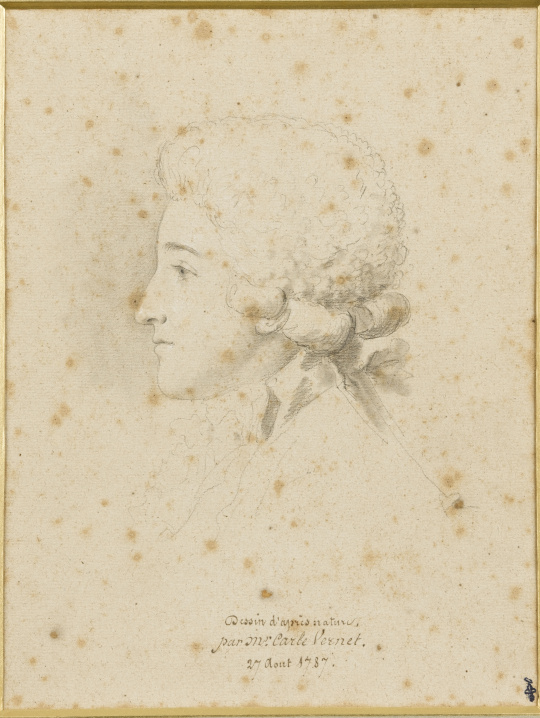
Profile of the 13-year-old Louis Philippe d'Orléans, drawn by Carle Vernet (27 August 1787)

Louis Philippe was born in the Palais-Royal, the residence of the Orléans family in Paris, to Louis Philippe, Duke of Chartres (Duke of Orléans, upon the death of his father Louis Philippe I), and Louise Marie Adélaïde de Bourbon. As a member of the reigning House of Bourbon, he was a Prince of the Blood, which entitled him the use of the style "Serene Highness". His mother was an extremely wealthy heiress who was descended from Louis XIV through a legitimized line.

Louis Philippe was the eldest of three sons and a daughter, a family that was to have erratic fortunes from the beginning of the French Revolution to the Bourbon Restoration. The elder branch of the House of Bourbon, to which the kings of France belonged, deeply distrusted the intentions of the cadet branch, which would succeed to the throne of France should the senior branch die out. Louis Philippe's father was exiled from the royal court, and the Orléans confined themselves to studies of the literature and sciences emerging from the Enlightenment.

=== Education ===
Louis Philippe was tutored by the Countess of Genlis, beginning in 1782. She instilled in him a fondness for liberal thought; it is probably during this period that Louis Philippe picked up his slightly Voltairean brand of Catholicism. When Louis Philippe's grandfather died in 1785, his father succeeded him as Duke of Orléans and Louis Philippe succeeded his father as Duke of Chartres.

In 1788, with the French Revolution looming, the young Louis Philippe showed his liberal sympathies when he helped break down the door of a prison cell in Mont Saint-Michel, during a visit there with the Countess of Genlis. From October 1788 to October 1789, the Palais Royal was a meeting-place for the revolutionaries.

== Revolution (1789–1793) ==
Louis Philippe grew up in a period that changed Europe as a whole, and following his father's strong support for the Revolution he involved himself completely in those changes. In his diary, he reports that he took the initiative to join the Jacobin Club, a move that his father supported.

=== Military service ===
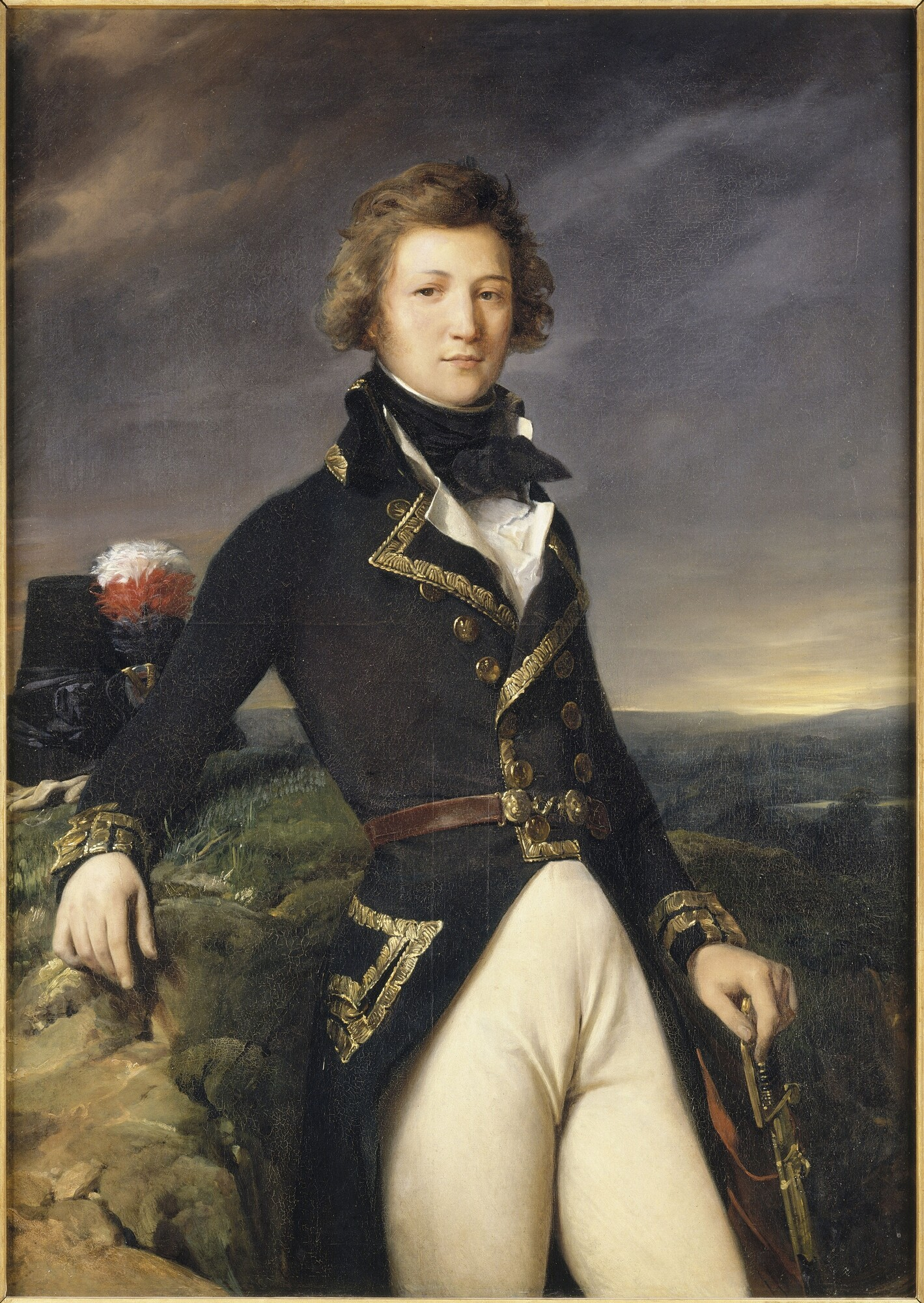
Louis Philippe, Duke of Chartres, in 1792 by Léon Cogniet (1834)

In June 1791, Louis Philippe got his first opportunity to become involved in the affairs of France. In 1785, he had been given the hereditary appointment of Colonel of the Chartres Dragoons (renamed 14th Dragoons in 1791). With war imminent in 1791, all proprietary colonels were ordered to join their regiments. Louis Philippe was a model officer, and demonstrated his personal bravery in two famous instances. First, three days after Louis XVI's flight to Varennes, a quarrel between two local priests and one of the new constitutional vicars became heated. A crowd surrounded the inn where the priests were staying, demanding blood. The young colonel broke through the crowd and extricated the two priests, who fled. At a river crossing on the same day, another crowd threatened to harm the priests. Louis Philippe put himself between a peasant armed with a carbine and the priests, saving their lives. The next day, Louis Philippe dived into a river to save a drowning local engineer. For this action, he received a civic crown from the local municipality. His regiment was moved north to Flanders at the end of 1791 after the 27 August 1791 Declaration of Pillnitz.

Louis Philippe served under his father's crony, Armand Louis de Gontaut the Duke of Biron, along with several officers who later gained distinction. These included Colonel Louis Alexandre Berthier and Lieutenant Colonel Alexandre de Beauharnais (husband of the future Empress Joséphine). After the Kingdom of France declared war on the Habsburg monarchy on 20 April 1792, Louis Philippe first participated in what became known as the French Revolutionary Wars within the French-occupied Austrian Netherlands at Boussu on about 28 April 1792. He was next engaged at Quaregnon on about 29 April 1792, and then at Quiévrain near Jemappes on about 30 April 1792. There he was instrumental in rallying a unit of retreating soldiers after French forces had been victorious at the Battle of Quiévrain (1792) two days earlier on 28 April 1792. The Duke of Biron wrote to War Minister Pierre Marie de Grave, praising the young colonel, who was promoted to brigadier general; he commanded the 4th Brigade of cavalry in Nicolas Luckner's Army of the North.

In the Army of the North, Louis Philippe served with four future Marshals of France: Étienne-Jacques-Joseph-Alexandre MacDonald, Édouard Adolphe Casimir Joseph Mortier (who would later be killed in an assassination attempt on Louis Philippe), Louis-Nicolas Davout and Nicolas Oudinot. Charles François Dumouriez was appointed to command the Army of the North in August 1792. Louis Philippe continued to command his brigade under him in the Valmy campaign. At the 20 September 1792 Battle of Valmy, Louis Philippe was ordered to place a battery of artillery on the crest of the hill of Valmy. The battle was apparently inconclusive, but the Austrian-Prussian army, short of supplies, was forced back across the Rhine. Dumouriez praised Louis Philippe's performance in a letter after the battle. Louis Philippe was recalled to Paris to give an account of the Battle at Valmy to the French government. He had a rather trying interview with Georges Danton, the Minister of Justice, which he later told his children about. Shortly thereafter, he was made Governor of Strasbourg.

While in Paris, Louis Philippe was promoted to the rank of lieutenant general. In October Louis Philippe returned to the Army of the North, where Dumouriez had begun a march into the Austrian Netherlands (now Belgium). Louis Philippe again commanded a brigade, even though he held the rank of lieutenant general. On 6 November 1792, Dumouriez chose to attack an Austrian force in a strong position on the heights of Cuesmes and Jemappes to the west of Mons. Louis Philippe's division sustained heavy casualties as it attacked through a wood, and retreated in disorder. Lt. General Louis Philippe rallied a group of units, dubbing them "the battalion of Mons", and pushed forward along with other French units, finally overwhelming the outnumbered Austrians.

Events in Paris undermined Louis Philippe's budding military career. The incompetence of Jean-Nicolas Pache, the new Girondist appointee of 3 October 1792, left the Army of the North almost without supplies. Soon thousands of troops were deserting the army. Louis Philippe was alienated by the more radical policies of the Republic. After the National Convention decided to put the deposed king to death, Louis Philippe began to consider leaving France. He was dismayed that his own father, known then as Philippe Égalité, voted in favour of the execution. Louis Philippe was willing to stay to fulfill his duties in the army, but he became implicated in the plot Dumouriez had planned to ally with the Austrians, march his army on Paris, and restore the Constitution of 1791. Dumouriez had met with Louis Philippe on 22 March 1793 and urged his subordinate to join in the attempt.

With the French government falling into the Reign of Terror about the time of the creation of the Revolutionary Tribunal earlier in March 1793, Louis Philippe decided to leave France to save his life. On 4 April, Dumouriez and Louis Philippe left for the Austrian camp. They were intercepted by Lieutenant-Colonel Louis-Nicolas Davout, who had served at the Battle of Jemappes with Louis Philippe. As Dumouriez ordered the Colonel back to the camp, some of his soldiers cried out against the General, now declared a traitor by the National Convention. Shots rang out as the two men fled toward the Austrian camp. The next day, Dumouriez again tried to rally soldiers against the convention; however, he found that the artillery had declared itself in favour of the Republic. He and Louis Philippe had no choice but to go into exile when Philippe Égalité was arrested. At the age of 19, and already ranked as a Lieutenant General, Louis Philippe left France. He did not return for 21 years.

== Exile (1793–1815) ==
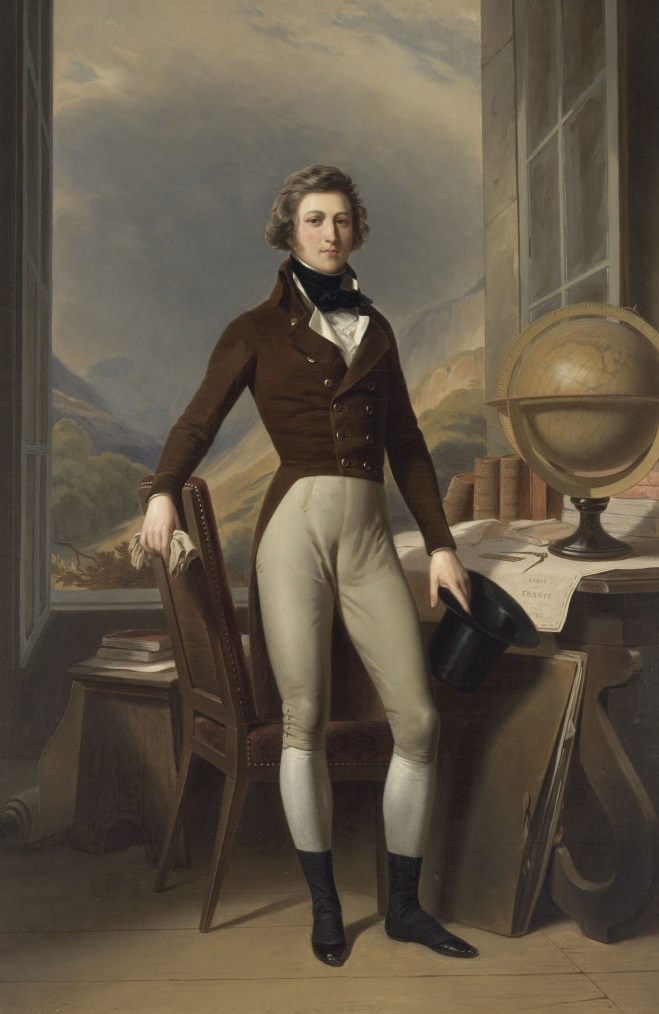
Early in his exile, Louis Philippe was a teacher of geography, history, mathematics and modern languages, at a boys' boarding school in Reichenau, Switzerland.

The reaction in Paris to Louis Philippe's involvement in Dumouriez's treason inevitably resulted in misfortunes for the Orléans family. Philippe Égalité spoke in the National Convention, condemning his son for his actions, asserting that he would not spare his son, much akin to the Roman consul Brutus and his sons. However, letters from Louis Philippe to his father were discovered in transit and were read out to the convention. Philippe Égalité was then put under continuous surveillance. Shortly thereafter, the Girondists moved to arrest him and the two younger brothers of Louis Philippe, Louis-Charles and Antoine Philippe; the latter had been serving in the Army of Italy. The three were interned in Fort Saint-Jean (Marseille).

Meanwhile, Louis Philippe was forced to live in the shadows, avoiding both pro-Republican revolutionaries and pro-Bourbon Legitimist French émigré centres in various parts of Europe and also in the Austrian army. He first moved to Switzerland under an assumed name, and met up with the Countess of Genlis and his sister Adélaïde at Schaffhausen. From there they went to Zurich, where the Swiss authorities decreed that to protect Swiss neutrality, Louis Philippe would have to leave the city. They went to Zug, where Louis Philippe was discovered by a group of émigrés.

It became quite apparent that for the women to settle peacefully anywhere, they would have to separate from Louis Philippe. He then left with his faithful valet Baudouin for the heights of the Alps, and then to Basel, where he sold all but one of his horses. Now moving from town to town throughout Switzerland, he and Baudouin found themselves very much exposed to all the distresses of extended travelling. They were refused entry to a monastery by monks who believed them to be young vagabonds. Another time, he woke up after spending a night in a barn to find himself at the far end of a musket, confronted by a man attempting to keep away thieves.

Throughout this period, Louis Philippe never stayed in one place more than 48 hours. Finally, in October 1793, Louis Philippe was appointed a teacher of geography, history, mathematics and modern languages, at a boys' boarding school. The school, owned by a Monsieur Jost, was in Reichenau, a village on the upper Rhine in the then independent Grisons league state, now part of Switzerland. His salary was 1,400 francs and he taught under the name Monsieur Chabos. He had been at the school for a month when he heard the news from Paris: his father had been guillotined on 6 November 1793 after a trial before the Revolutionary Tribunal.

=== Travel ===
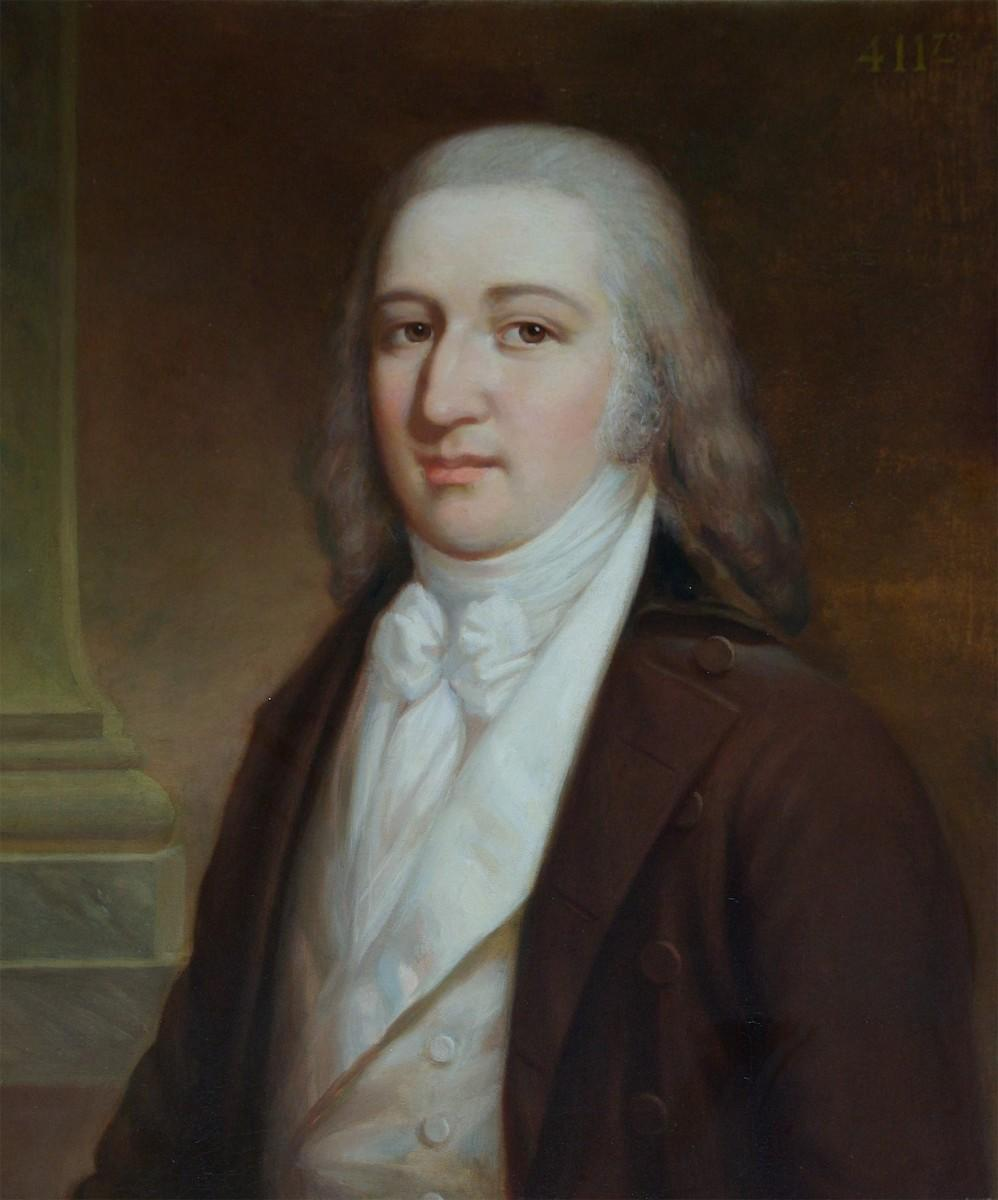
Portrait of Louis Philippe (age 24) at the time of his stay in New York City (1797), originally painted by James Sharples

After Louis Philippe left Reichenau, he separated the now 16-year-old Adélaïde from the Countess of Genlis, who had fallen out with Louis Philippe. Adélaïde went to live with her great-aunt the Princess of Conti at Fribourg, then to Bavaria and Hungary and, finally, to her mother, who was exiled in Spain. Louis Philippe travelled extensively. He visited Scandinavia in 1795 and then moved on to Finland. For about a year he stayed in Muonio, a remote village in the valley of the Tornio river in Lapland. He lived in the rectory under the name Müller, as a guest of the local Lutheran vicar. While visiting Muonio, he supposedly fathered a child with Beata Caisa Wahlborn called Erik Kolstrøm (1796–1879).

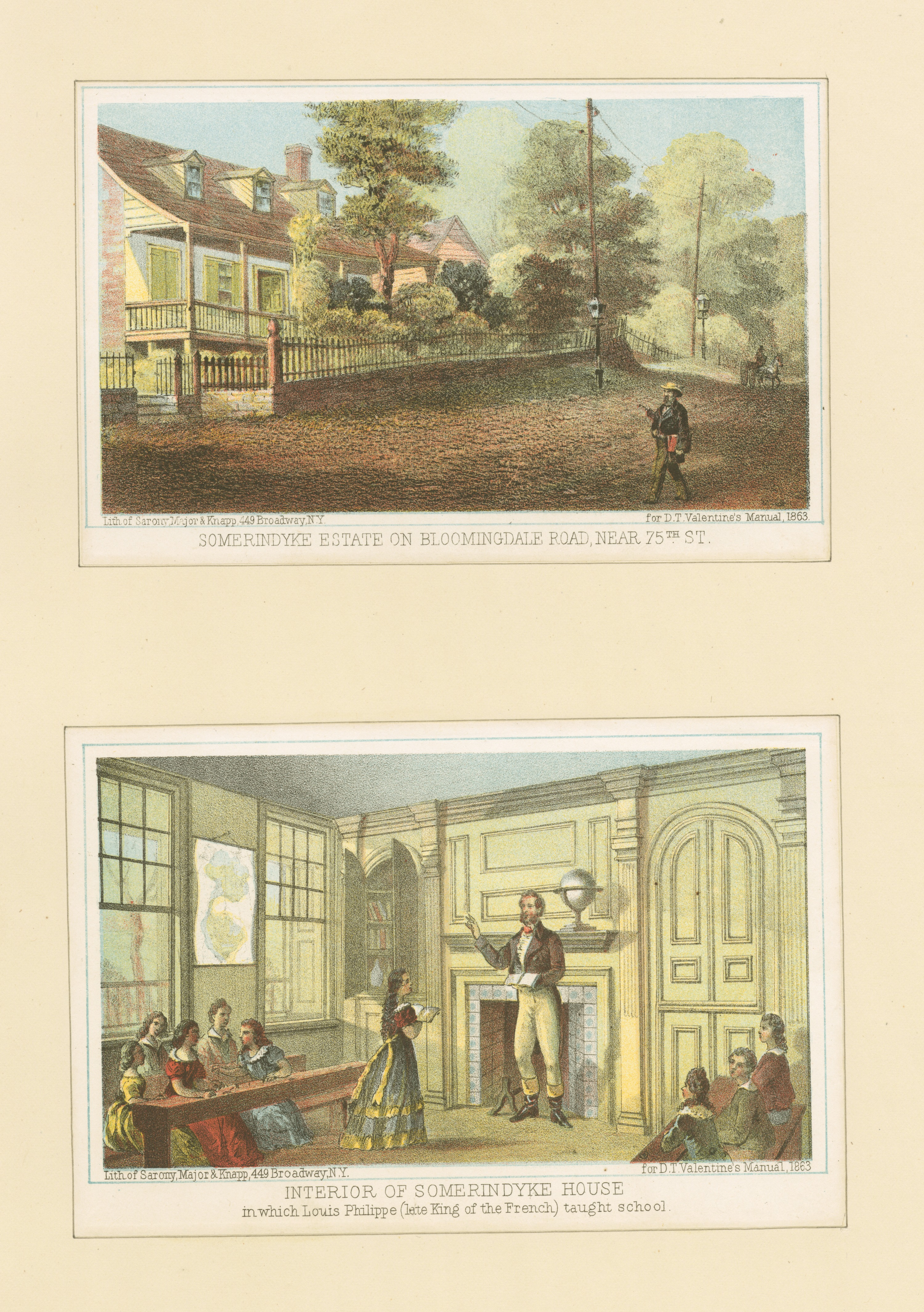
Somerindyke estate on Bloomingdale Road, near 75th St.

Louis Philippe visited the United States (c. 1796 to 1798), staying in Philadelphia (where his brothers Antoine and Louis Charles were in exile), New York City (where he most likely stayed at the Somerindyck family estate on Broadway north of modern 75th Street with other exiled princes), and Boston. In Boston, he taught French for a time and lived in lodgings over what is now the Union Oyster House, Boston's oldest restaurant.

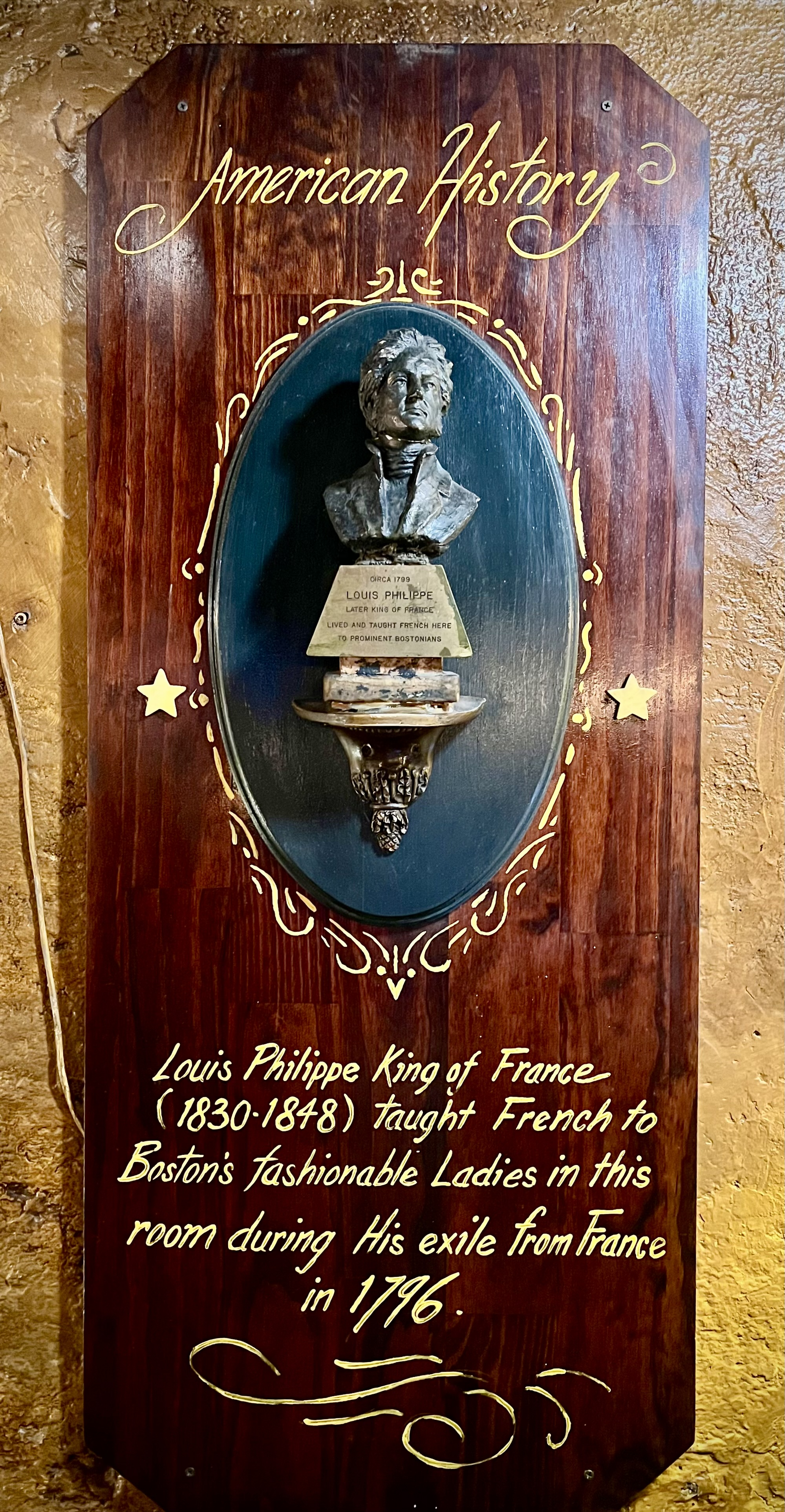
Commemorative plaque, Louis Philippe Boston Oyster House

During his time in the United States, Louis Philippe met with American politicians and people of high society, including George Clinton, John Jay, Alexander Hamilton, and George Washington.

Louis Philippe's visit to Cape Cod in 1797 coincided with the division of the town of Eastham into two towns, one of which took the name of Orleans, possibly in his honour. During their sojourn, the Orléans princes travelled throughout the country, as far south as Nashville and as far north as Maine. The brothers were even held in Philadelphia briefly during an outbreak of yellow fever. Louis Philippe is also thought to have met Isaac Snow of Orleans, Massachusetts, who had escaped to France from a British prison hulk during the American Revolutionary War. In 1839, while reflecting on his visit to the United States, Louis Philippe explained in a letter to François Guizot that his three years there had a large influence on his political beliefs and judgments when he became king.

In Boston, Louis Philippe learned of the coup of 18 Fructidor (4 September 1797) and of the exile of his mother to Spain. He and his brothers then decided to return to Europe. They went to New Orleans, planning to sail to Havana and thence to Spain. This, however, was a troubled journey, as Spain and Great Britain were then at war. While in colonial Louisiana in 1798, they were entertained by Julien Poydras in the town of Pointe Coupée, as well as by the Marigny de Mandeville family in New Orleans.

The three brothers sailed for Havana in an American corvette, but a British warship intercepted their ship in the Gulf of Mexico. The British seized the brothers, but took them to Havana anyway. Unable to find passage to Europe, the brothers spent a year in Cuba (from spring 1798 to autumn 1799), until they were unexpectedly expelled by the Spanish authorities. They sailed via the Bahamas to Nova Scotia, where they were received by the Duke of Kent, son of King George III and (later) father of Queen Victoria. Louis Philippe struck up a lasting friendship with the British prince. Eventually, the brothers sailed back to New York, and in January 1800, they arrived in England, where they stayed for the next fifteen years. During these years, Louis Philippe taught mathematics and geography at the now-defunct Great Ealing School, reckoned, in its 19th-century heyday, to be "the best private school in England".

=== In British service ===
Louis Philippe and his brothers were not officially received as royals at the British court, but they were able to blend in socially with the English aristocracy, and by November 1801 Louis Philippe admitted to his brothers that he was "putting down roots in the country". By October 1803, his new loyalties led to a clash with Charles Philippe, Count of Artois (the future king Charles X), when he wore the Hanoverian black cockade in place of the French white cockade on inspecting French royalist volunteer troops in London. In July 1804, he wrote to the Bishop of Llandaff that global security and the future of humankind depended on England's resistance to Napoleon. In the summer of 1807, he moved his residence from Twickenham to the Duke of Kent's Castle Hill Lodge.

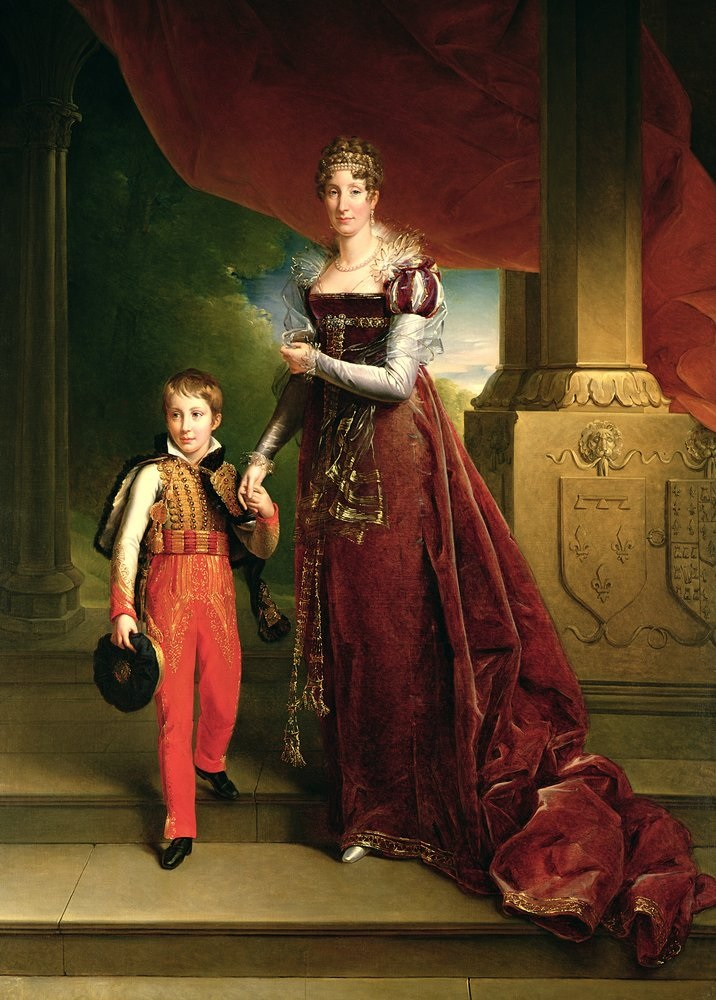
Maria Amalia, Duchess of Orléans, with her son Ferdinand Philippe

In 1808, Louis Philippe proposed to Princess Elizabeth, daughter of King George III. His Catholicism and the opposition of her mother, Queen Charlotte, meant the Princess reluctantly declined the offer.

On 15 April 1808, Louis Philippe departed from Portsmouth for Palermo in the then British protectorate of Sicily via Gibraltar, Cagliari, Valletta (where his sole surviving brother, Louis Charles, died) and Messina, arriving on 20 June. He remained in Sicily in the pay of the British Foreign Office until the Bourbon First Restoration in 1814; he was last remunerated at the discretion of Lord A'Court, the British representative in Palermo, after July 1814. In his role as a British agent, he initially prepared for a mission in Mexico, where he was to act as the military adviser to Leopold, Prince of Salerno in inciting an anti-French rebellion with British naval support. After the news of the outbreak of the Peninsular War reached Sicily in July 1808, he sailed for Gibraltar of his own initiative with the prince, but was directed to London and prohibited entry into Spain on pain of losing his allowance. He passed the winter in Malta and returned to Sicily in March 1809 upon receiving British authorisation for a military campaign in Italy against Joachim Murat, but instead he spent two months in Cagliari (from April to June 1809) trying to persuade Victor Emmanuel I to launch an attack against Napoleon in the Po Valley. During this time, he finally gave up on marrying Princess Elizabeth and unsuccessfully lobbied the Bourbons of Sicily to obtain the Ionian Islands as a principality for himself.

On 25 November 1809, Louis Philippe married Princess Maria Amalia of Naples and Sicily, daughter of King Ferdinand IV of Naples and Maria Carolina of Austria, in Palermo. The marriage was controversial because her mother's younger sister was Queen Marie Antoinette, and Louis Philippe's father was considered to have a role in Marie Antoinette's execution. The Queen of Naples was opposed to the match for this reason. She had been very close to her sister and devastated by her execution, but she had given her consent after Louis Philippe had convinced her that he was determined to compensate for the mistakes of his father, and after having agreed to answer all her questions regarding his father.

== Bourbon Restoration (1815–1830) ==
After the abdication of Napoleon, Louis Philippe, known as Louis Philippe, Duke of Orléans, returned to France during the reign of his distant cousin Louis XVIII, at the time of the Bourbon Restoration. Louis Philippe had reconciled the Orléans family with Louis XVIII in exile, and was once more to be found in the elaborate royal court. However, his resentment at the treatment of his family, the cadet branch of the House of Bourbon under the Ancien Régime, caused friction between him and Louis XVIII, and he openly sided with the liberal opposition.

Upon his return to Paris in May 1814, the Duke of Orléans was restored to the rank of lieutenant-general in the army by Louis XVIII. He was denied the title of Altesse Royale (Royal Highness), although it was accorded to his wife. Louis Philippe had to settle for the lesser Altesse Serenissime (Serene Highness). Less than a year after returning to France, he and his family were uprooted by the return of Napoléon from Elba, known as the Hundred Days. On 6 March 1815, after the news of Napoléon's return to France reached Paris, Louis Philippe was dispatched to Lyon with the Comte d'Artois (the future Charles X) to organize a defense against the Emperor, but the hopelessness of the situation soon became apparent and he was back in the capital by the 12th. Thereafter, Louis XVIII made him commander of the Army of the North. In the days after Napoléon entered Paris (20 March), Louis XVIII fled to Belgium and Louis Philippe resigned his commission, choosing to join his family in exile in England. This brought him further scorn from royalists because he did not join Louis XVIII in Belgium. Napoléon was soon defeated in the Battle of Waterloo and Louis XVIII was restored to power, but Louis Philippe and his family only returned to France in 1817, after the wave of repression and recriminations had faded.

Louis Philippe was on far friendlier terms with Louis XVIII's brother and successor, Charles X, who acceded to the throne in 1824, and with whom he socialized. Charles X granted him the Altesse Royale title, and permitted Louis Henri, Prince of Condé to make Louis Philippe's fourth son, Henri d'Orléans, Duke of Aumale, heir to the domaine of Chantilly. However, Louis Philippe's opposition to the policies of Joseph de Villèle and later of Jules de Polignac caused him to be viewed as a constant threat to the stability of Charles' government. This soon proved to be to his advantage.

== King of the French (1830–1848) ==
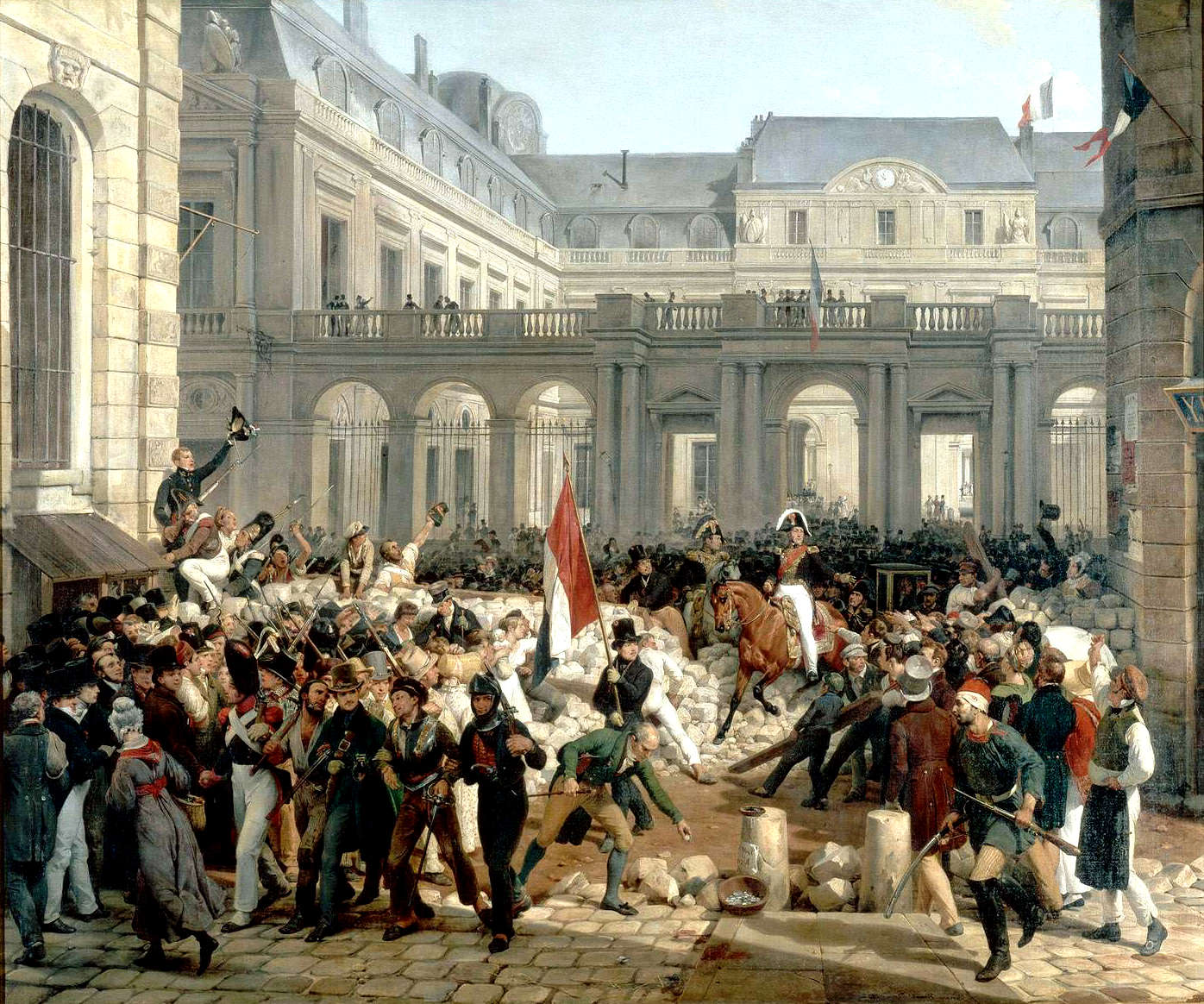
Louis The Duke of Orleans Leaving the Palais-Royal by Horace Vernet. Philippe d'Orléans leaving the Palais-Royal to go to the Town Hall, 31 July 1830, two days after the July Revolution

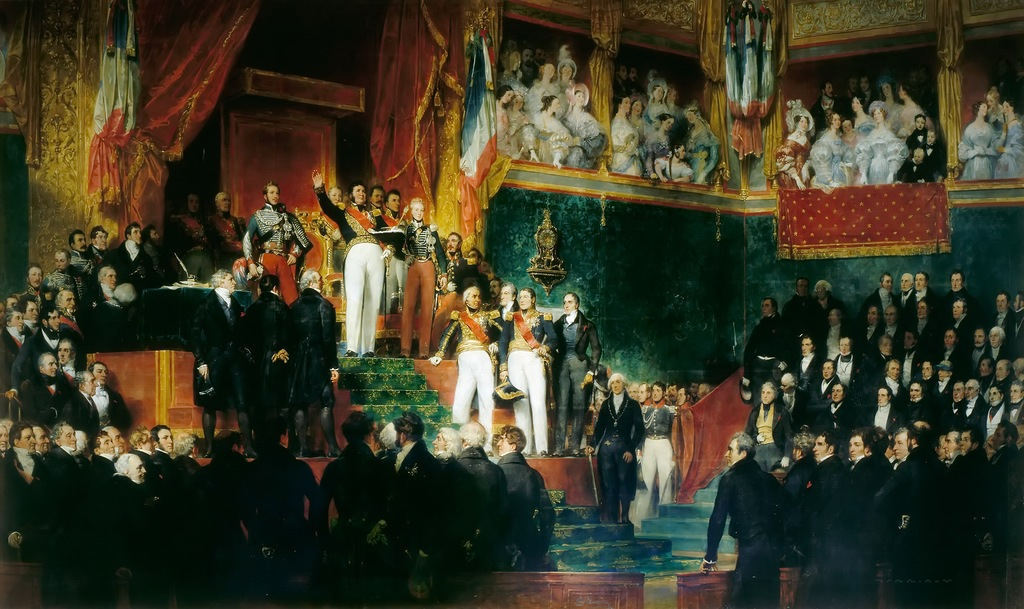
King Louis Philippe I taking the oath to keep the Charter of 1830 on 9 August 1830

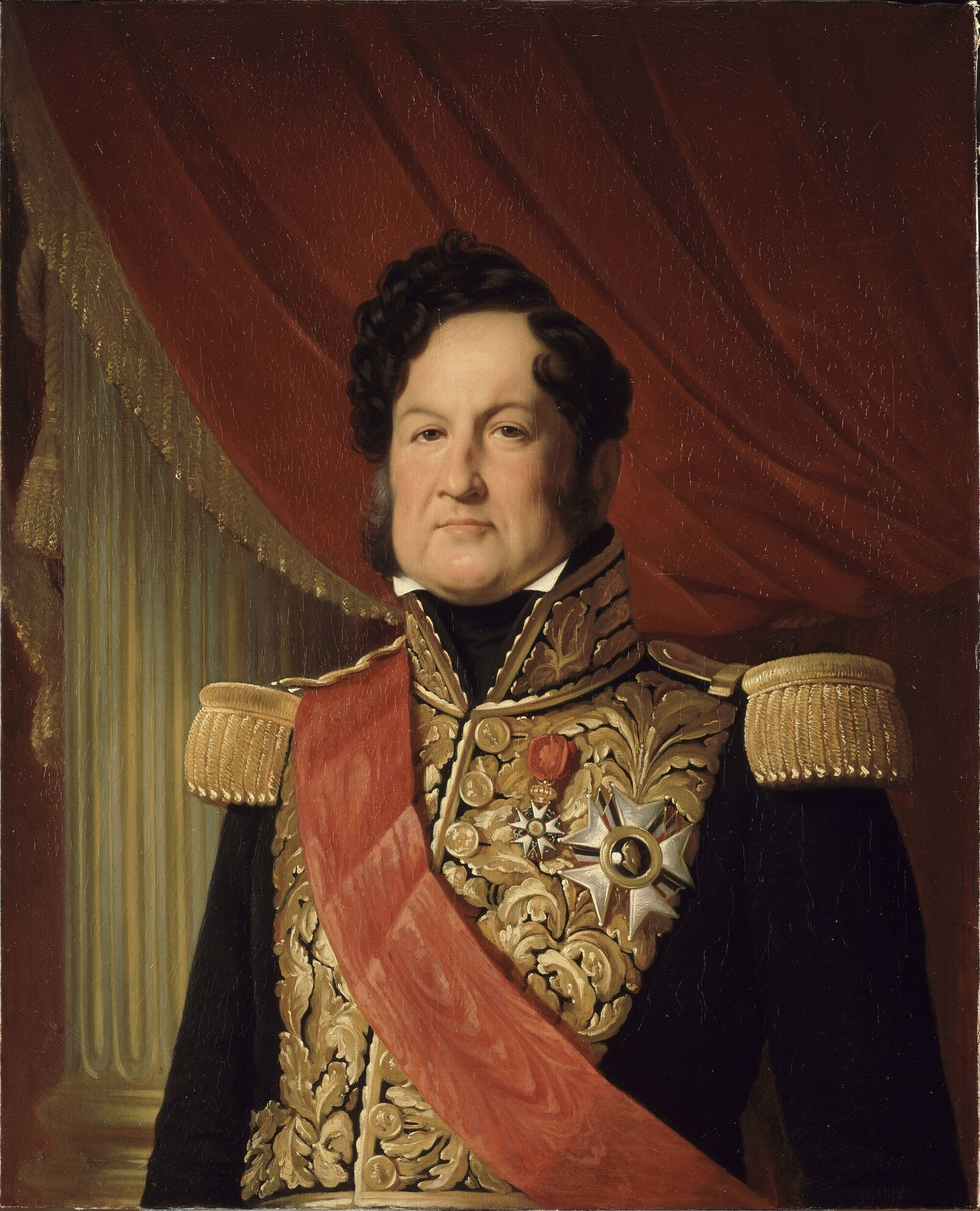
King Louis Philippe, Portrait by Louise Adélaïde Desnos (1838)

In 1830, the July Revolution overthrew Charles X, who abdicated in favour of his 10-year-old grandson, Henri, Duke of Bordeaux. Charles X named Louis Philippe Lieutenant général du royaume, and charged him to announce his desire to have his grandson succeed him to the popularly elected Chamber of Deputies. Louis Philippe did not do this, in order to increase his own chances of succession. As a consequence, because the chamber was aware of his liberal policies and of his popularity with the masses, they proclaimed Louis Philippe as the new French king, displacing the senior branch of the House of Bourbon. For the prior eleven days Louis Philippe had been acting as the regent for the young Henri.

Charles X and his family, including his grandson, went into exile in the United Kingdom. The young ex-king, the Duke of Bordeaux, in exile took the title of Comte de Chambord. Later he became the pretender to the throne of France and was supported by the Legitimists. Louis Philippe was sworn in as King Louis Philippe I on 9 August 1830. Upon his accession to the throne, Louis Philippe assumed the title of King of the French, a title previously adopted by Louis XVI in the short-lived Constitution of 1791. Linking the monarchy to a people instead of a territory (as the previous designation King of France and of Navarre) was aimed at undercutting the Legitimist claims of Charles X and his family.

By an ordinance he signed on 13 August 1830, (Note: Louis Philippe's 13 August 1830 Ordinance, relative to the surname (nom) and titles of his children and of his sister: Ordonnance du roi qui détermine les noms et titres des princes et princesses de la famille royale. LOUIS PHILIPPE ROI DES FRANÇAIS, à tous présens et à venir, salut. Notre avènement à la couronne ayant rendu nécessaire de déterminer les noms et les titres que devaient porter à l'avenir les princes et princesses nos enfans, ainsi que notre bien-aimée sœur, Nous avons ordonné et ordonnons ce qui suit : Les princes et princesses nos bien-aimés enfans, ainsi que notre bien-aimée sœur, continueront à porter le nom et les armes d'Orléans. Notre bien-aimé fils aîné, le duc de Chartres, portera, comme prince royal, le titre de duc d'Orléans. Nos bien-aimés fils puînés conserveront les titres qu'ils ont portés jusqu'à ce jour. Nos bien-aimées filles et notre bien-aimée sœur ne porteront d'autre titre que celui de princesses d'Orléans, en se distinguant entre elles par leurs prénoms. Il sera fait, en conséquence, sur les registres de l'état civil de la Maison royale, dans les archives de la Chambre des Pairs, toutes les rectifications qui résultent des dispositions ci-dessus ...) the new king defined the manner in which his children, as well as his "beloved" sister, would continue to bear the surname "d'Orléans" and the arms of Orléans, declared that his eldest son, as Prince Royal (not Dauphin), would bear the title Duke of Orléans, that the younger sons would continue to have their previous titles, and that his sister and daughters would be styled Princesses of Orléans, not of France. His ascent to the title of King of the French was seen as a betrayal by Emperor Nicholas I of Russia. Nicholas ended their friendship. In 1832, Louis' daughter, Princess Louise-Marie, married the first ruler of Belgium, King Leopold I. Their descendants include all subsequent Kings of the Belgians, and Empress Carlota of Mexico.

== Rule ==
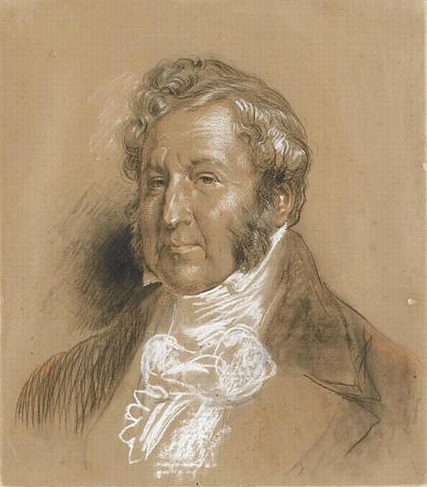
Louis Philippe (1773–1850), Roi Bourgeois by Eugène Lami

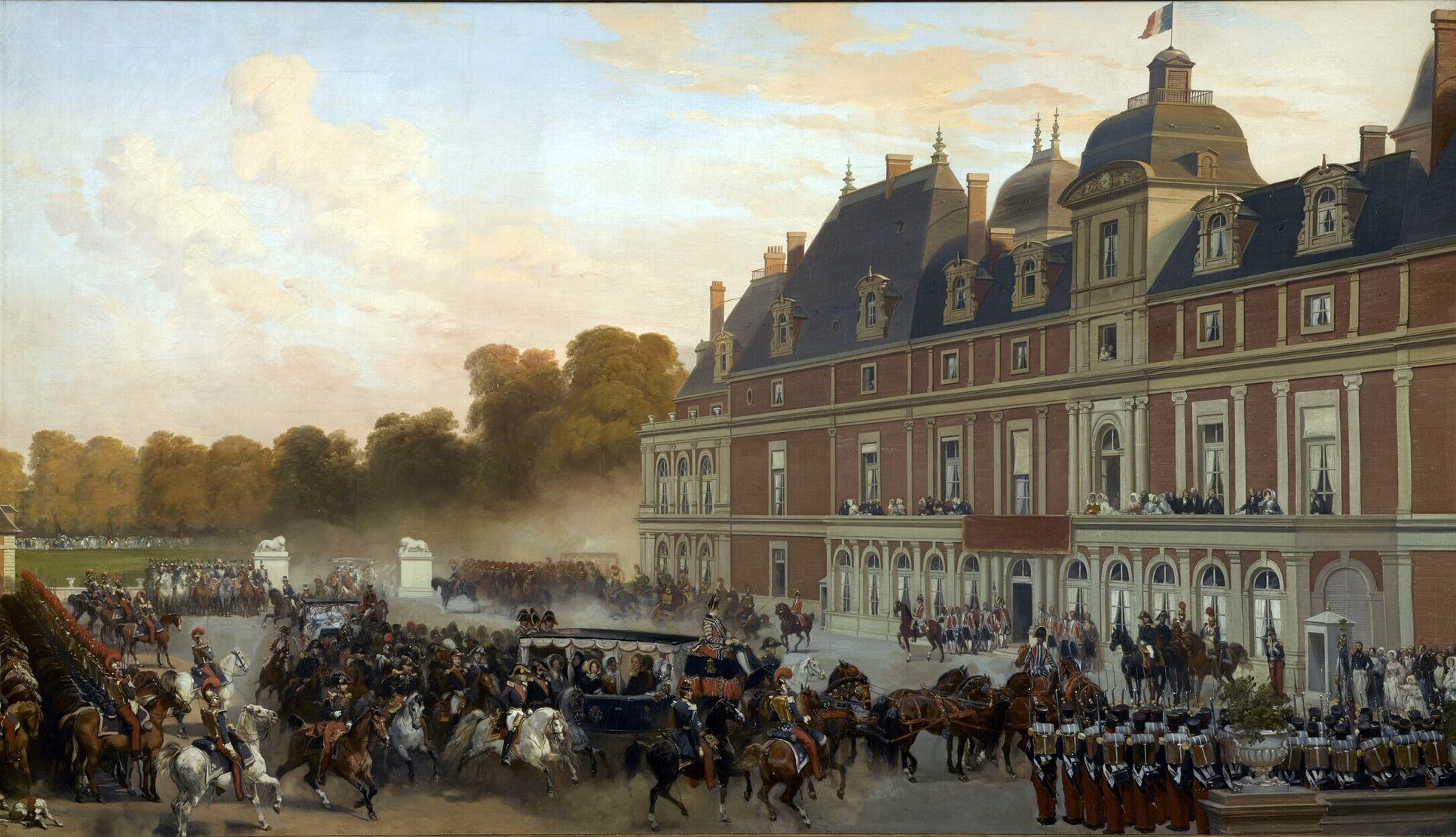
The Arrival of Queen Victoria at the Château d'Eu by Eugène Lami. Queen Victoria arrives at the Château d'Eu during her visit in 1843

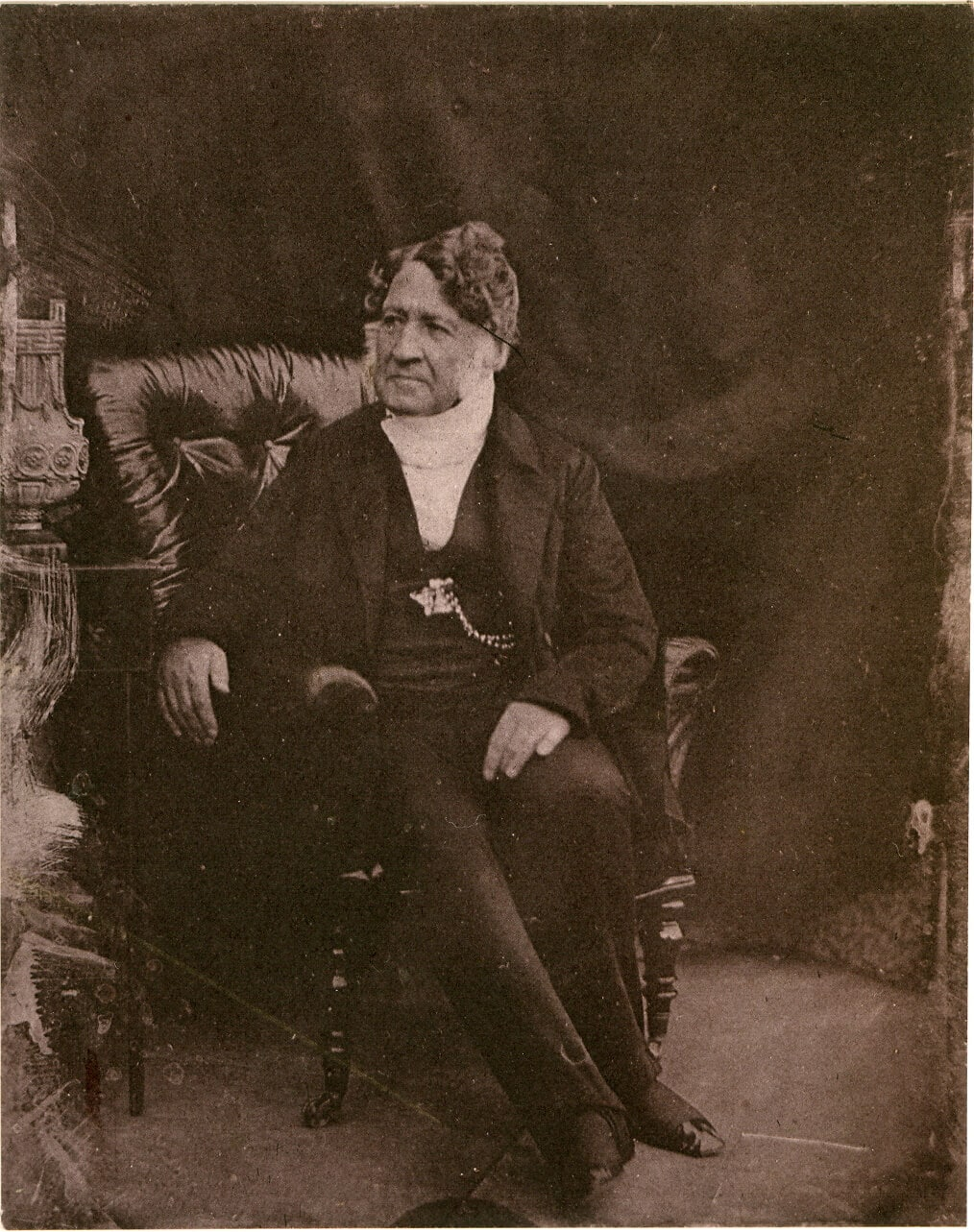
Louis Philippe I is the only French king to be the subject of a photograph while reigning (1842 daguerreotype)

Louis Philippe ruled in an unpretentious fashion, avoiding the pomp and lavish spending of his predecessors. Despite this outward appearance of simplicity, his support came from the wealthy bourgeoisie. At first, he was much loved and called the "Citizen King" and the "bourgeois monarch", but his popularity suffered as his government was perceived as increasingly conservative and monarchical.

Because he owed his elevation to a revolution in Paris and a faction of liberal deputies in the parliament of Charles X, Louis Philippe's rule "lacked...the mystical appeal of its Divine Right predecessor. Support for it was to a much greater degree conditional." Unlike his predecessor, he did not have a dynastic legacy to draw on, so he turned to the glories of Napoleon I to prop up his own regime. He supported the return of Napoleon's remains to France and his son, the Duke of Joinville, brought the remains from Saint Helena for reinterment at Les Invalides. The statue of Napoleon was returned to its spot atop the Vendôme Column in 1833, and the Arc de Triomphe, a monument to Napoleon's victories, was inaugurated in 1836. (The monument includes a memorial to Louis Philippe's own contributions to the Revolutionary wars, as his name being inscribed on the northern pillar of the Arc as "Chartres" because he was Duke of Chartres during his revolutionary military service.) Louis Philippe also commissioned the creation of a national history museum at the Palace of Versailles, where famous Napoleonic battles were painted by important artists.

In parliament, the narrow, property-qualified electorate of the time (only about 1 in every 170 citizens was enfranchised at the beginning of the reign) provided Louis Philippe with consistent support. Under his management, the conditions of the working classes deteriorated, and the income gap widened considerably. According to William Fortescue, "Louis Philippe owed his throne to a popular revolution in Paris, he was the 'King of the Barricades', yet he went on to preside over a regime which rapidly gained notoriety for political repression of the left, class oppression of the poor and rule in the interests of the rich." In foreign affairs, it was a quiet period, with friendship with the United Kingdom. In October 1844 he paid a visit to Queen Victoria at Windsor Castle. This made him the first reigning French king to set foot on English soil since Jean II was imprisoned there after the Battle of Poitiers in 1356.

Throughout his reign, Louis Philippe faced domestic opposition from various factions, ranging from Legitimists supporting the senior branch of the Bourbons over the Orléans branch, to Republicans. This opposition, however, was weak and fragmented. In the spring of 1832, a terrible outbreak of cholera in Paris fueled resentment against the July Monarchy and reignited revolutionary fervor. Many Parisians blamed Louis Philippe and his government for their perceived inaction in the face of the epidemic. This resentment culminated in the short-lived Republican uprising called the June Rebellion, in which insurrectionists took over a portion of central Paris. The rebellion was quickly crushed by a huge force of soldiers and National Guards who descended on the city. Louis Philippe showed a cool resolve throughout the crisis, coming to Paris as soon as he was informed of the disturbances, greeting the troops, and going amongst the people.

An industrial and agricultural depression in 1846 led to the 1848 Revolutions, and Louis Philippe's abdication. The dissonance between his positive early reputation and his late unpopularity was epitomized by Victor Hugo in Les Misérables as an oxymoron describing his reign as "Prince Equality", in which Hugo states:

[Louis Philippe had to] bear in his own person the contradiction of the Restoration and the Revolution, to have that disquieting side of the revolutionary which becomes reassuring in governing power ... He had been proscribed, a wanderer, poor. He had lived by his own labor. In Switzerland, this heir to the richest princely domains in France had sold an old horse in order to obtain bread. At Reichenau, he gave lessons in mathematics, while his sister Adelaide did wool work and sewed. These souvenirs connected with a king rendered the bourgeoisie enthusiastic. He had, with his own hands, demolished the iron cage of Mont-Saint-Michel, built by Louis XI, and used by Louis XV. He was the companion of Dumouriez, he was the friend of Lafayette; he had belonged to the Jacobins' club; Mirabeau had slapped him on the shoulder; Danton had said to him: "Young man!"

What is there against him? That throne. Take away Louis Philippe the king, there remains the man. And the man is good. He is good at times even to the point of being admirable. Often, in the midst of his gravest souvenirs, after a day of conflict with the whole diplomacy of the continent, he returned at night to his apartments, and there, exhausted with fatigue, overwhelmed with sleep, what did he do? He took a death sentence and passed the night in revising a criminal suit, considering it something to hold his own against Europe, but that it was a still greater matter to rescue a man from the executioner.

== Assassination attempts ==
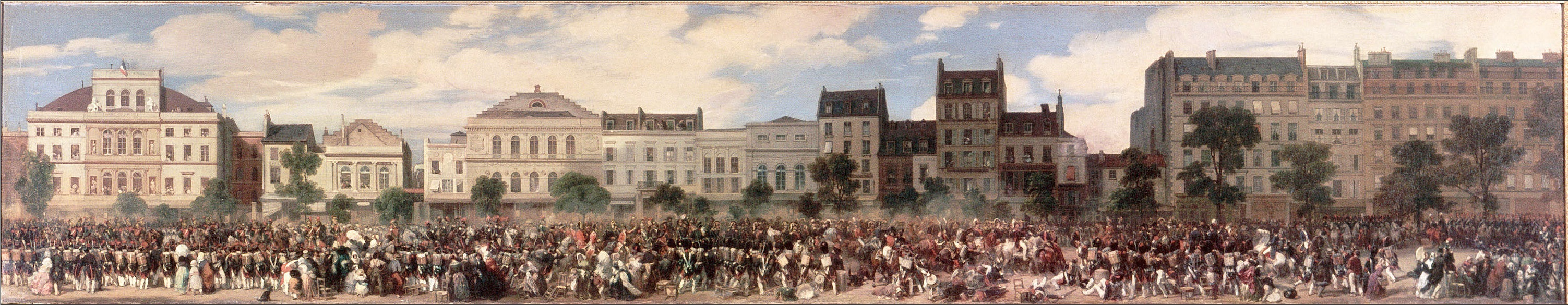
Review of the National Guard, attack of Fieschi, 28 July 1835 by Eugène Lami

Louis Philippe survived seven assassination attempts. On 28 July 1835, Louis Philippe survived an assassination attempt by Giuseppe Mario Fieschi and two other conspirators in Paris. During the king's annual review of the Paris National Guard commemorating the revolution, Louis Philippe was passing along the Boulevard du Temple, which connected Place de la République to the Bastille, accompanied by three of his sons, Ferdinand Philippe, Duke of Orléans, Prince Louis, Duke of Nemours, and François d'Orléans, Prince of Joinville, and numerous staff.

Fieschi, a Corsican ex-soldier, attacked the procession with a weapon he built himself, a volley gun that later became known as the Machine infernale. This consisted of 25 gun barrels fastened to a wooden frame that could be fired simultaneously. The device was fired from the third level of n° 50 Boulevard du Temple (a commemorative plaque has since been engraved there), which had been rented by Fieschi. A ball only grazed the King's forehead. Eighteen people were killed, including Lieutenant Colonel Joseph Rieussec of the 8th Legion together with eight other officers, Marshal Mortier, duc de Trévise, and Colonel Raffet, General Girard, Captain Villate, General La Chasse de Vérigny, a woman, a 14-year-old girl and two men. A further 22 people were injured. The King and the princes escaped essentially unharmed. Horace Vernet, the King's painter, was ordered to make a drawing of the event.

Several of the gun barrels of Fieschi's weapon burst when it was fired; he was badly injured and was quickly captured. He was executed by guillotine together with his two co-conspirators the following year.

== Abdication and death (1848–1850) ==
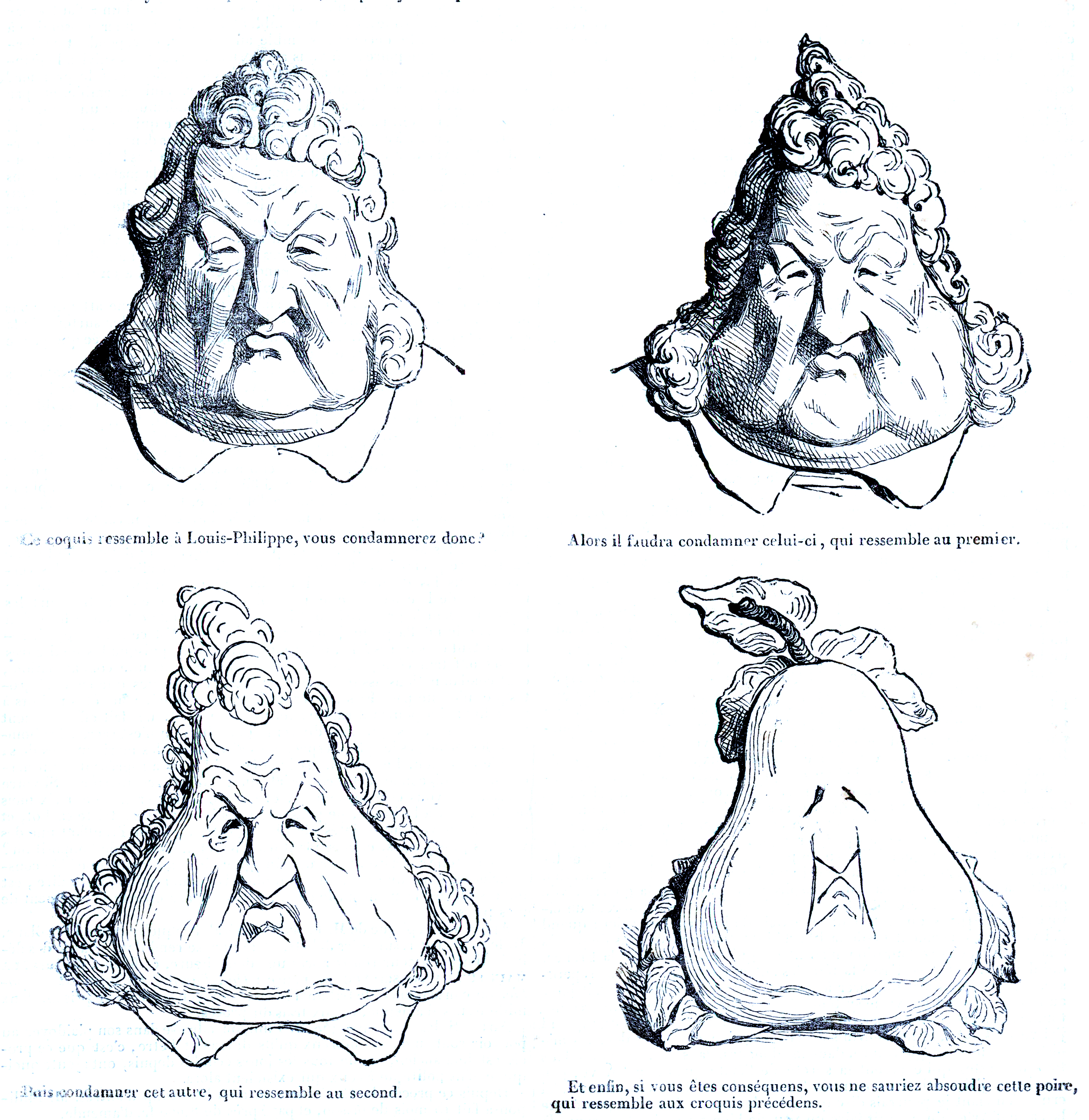
1834 caricature of Louis Philippe turning into a pear mirrored the deterioration of his popularity (Honoré Daumier, after Charles Philipon, who was imprisoned for the original)

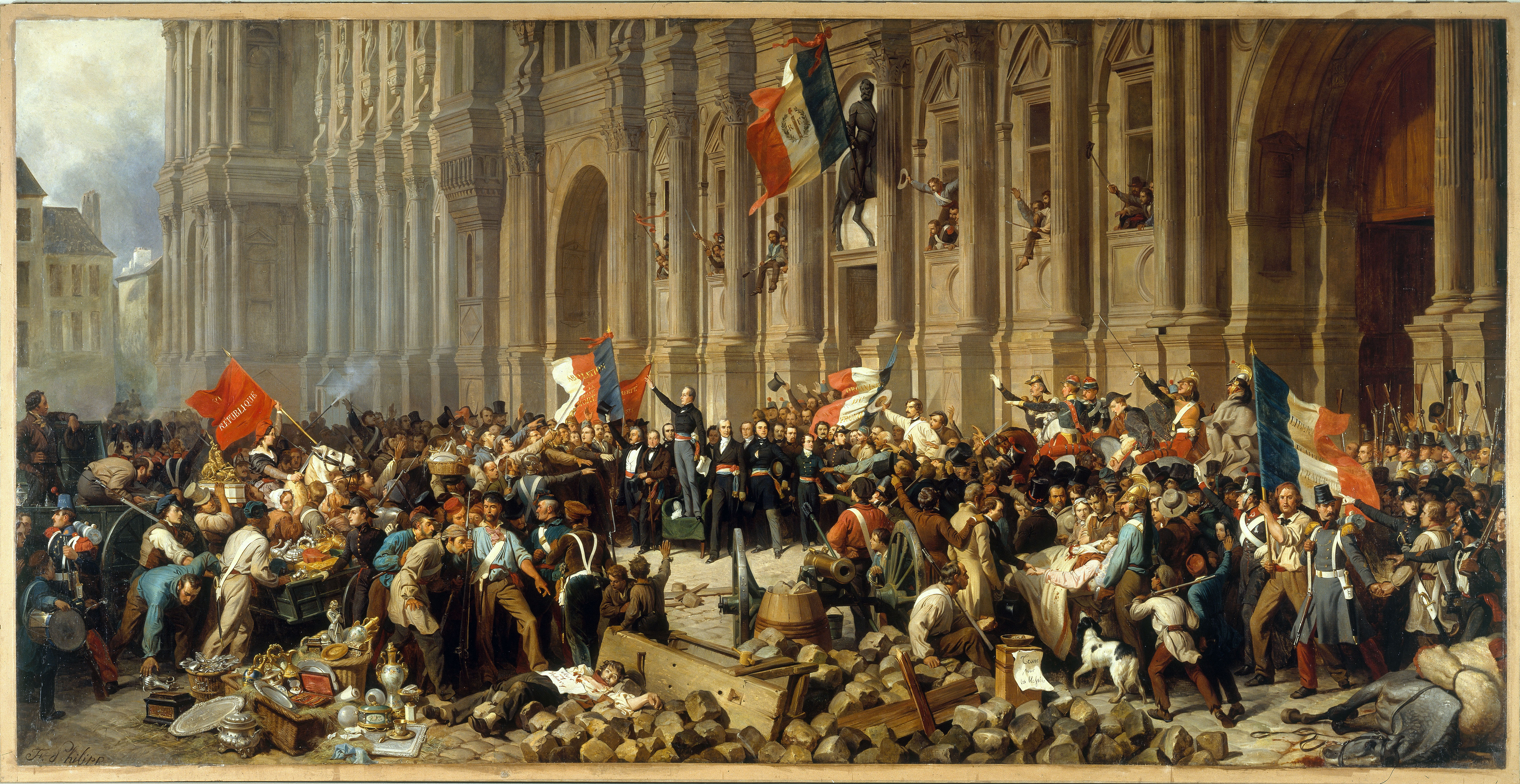
Lamartine Rejecting the Red Flag in Front of the City Hall by Henri Félix Emmanuel Philippoteaux. A key scene during the February 1848 Revolution

On 24 February 1848, during the February 1848 Revolution, King Louis Philippe abdicated in favour of his nine-year-old grandson, Philippe. Fearful of what had happened to the deposed Louis XVI, Louis Philippe quickly left Paris under disguise. He rode in an ordinary cab under the name of "Mr. Smith". He fled to England with his wife on board a packet boat offered to him by the British consul at Le Havre.

The National Assembly of France initially planned to accept young Philippe as king, but the strong current of public opinion rejected that. On 26 February, the Second Republic was proclaimed. Louis Napoléon Bonaparte was elected president on 10 December 1848; on 2 December 1851, he declared himself president for life and then Emperor Napoleon III in 1852.

Louis Philippe and his family remained in exile in Great Britain in Claremont, Surrey, though a plaque on Angel Hill, Bury St Edmunds, claims that he spent some time there, possibly due to a friendship with the Marquess of Bristol, who lived nearby at Ickworth House. The royal couple spent some time by the sea at St. Leonards and later at the Marquess's home in Brighton. Louis Philippe died at Claremont on 26 August 1850. He was first buried at St. Charles Borromeo Chapel in Weybridge, Surrey. In 1876, his remains and those of his wife were taken to France and buried at the Chapelle royale de Dreux, the Orléans family necropolis his mother had built in 1816, which he had enlarged and embellished after her death.

== Honours ==
=== National ===
Silver coin of Louis Philippe I, struck 1834
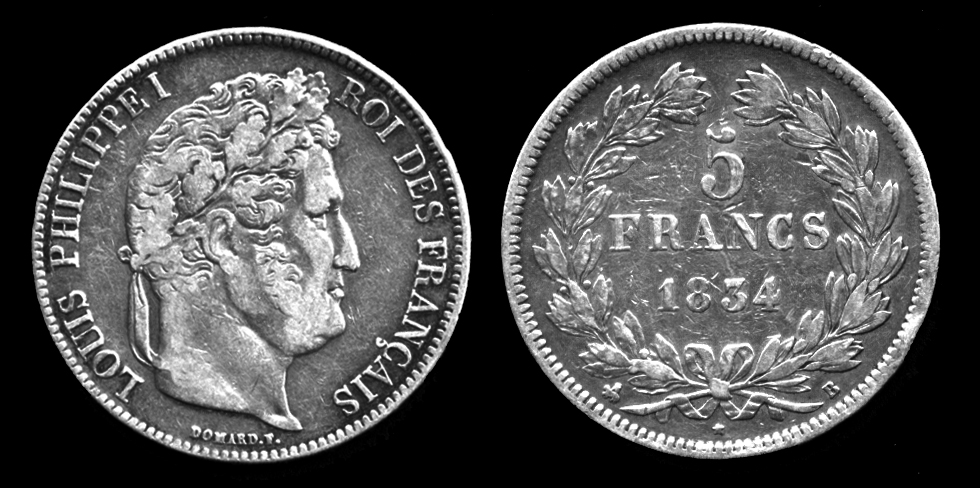
First side of the image: Obverse: (French) LOUIS PHILIPPE I, ROI DES FRANÇAIS, in English: "Louis Philippe I, King of the French"
Second side of the image: Reverse: 5 FRANCS, 1834
- Knight of the Holy Spirit, 2 February 1789
- Grand Cross of the Legion of Honour, 3 July 1816; Grand Master, 9 August 1830
- Grand Cross of the Military Order of St. Louis, 10 July 1816
- Founder and Grand Master of the Order of the Cross of July, 13 December 1830

=== Foreign ===
- Belgium: Grand Cordon of the Order of Leopold, 10 March 1833
- Denmark: Knight of the Elephant, 30 April 1846
- (Saxe-Coburg and Gotha) (Duchy of Saxe-Altenburg) (Saxe-Meiningen) Ernestine duchies: Grand Cross of the Saxe-Ernestine House Order, March 1840
- Netherlands: Grand Cross of the Military William Order, 22 March 1842
- Spain: Knight of the Golden Fleece, 21 February 1834
- Beylik of Tunis: Husainid Family Order
- Two Sicilies:
  - Knight of St. Januarius
  - Grand Cross of St. Ferdinand and Merit
- United Kingdom: Stranger Knight of the Garter, 11 October 1844

=== Arms ===
Standard of Louis Philippe I

Personal coat of arms of Louis Philippe I

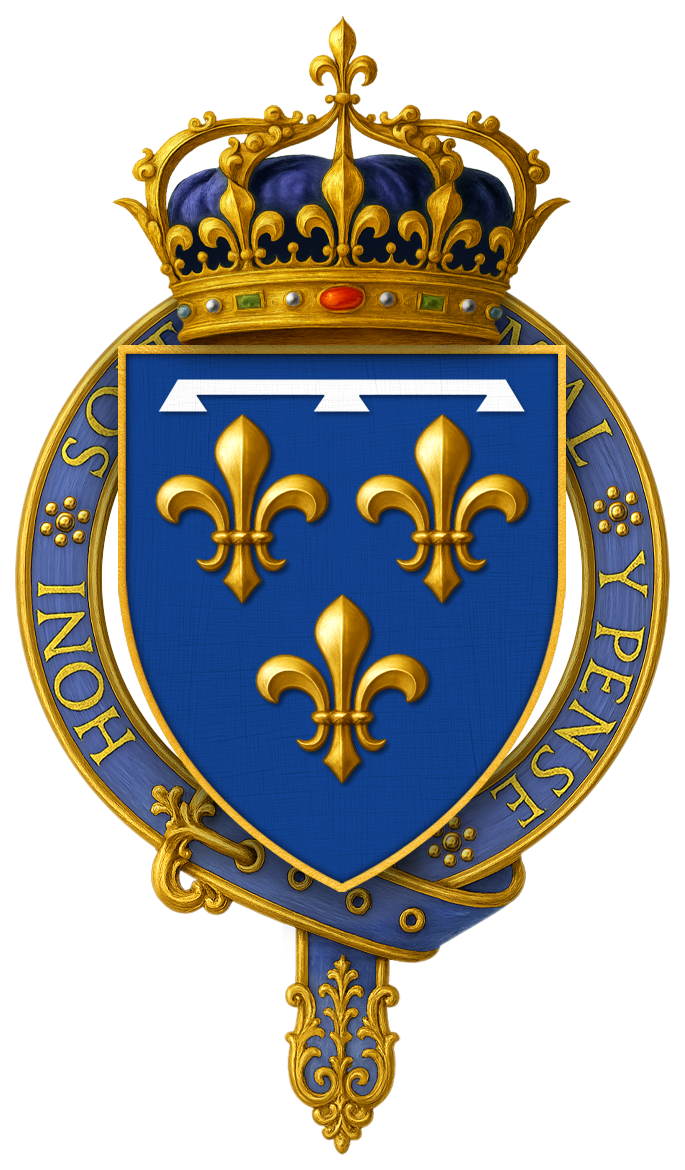
Gartered arms of Louis Philippe I

=== Territory ===
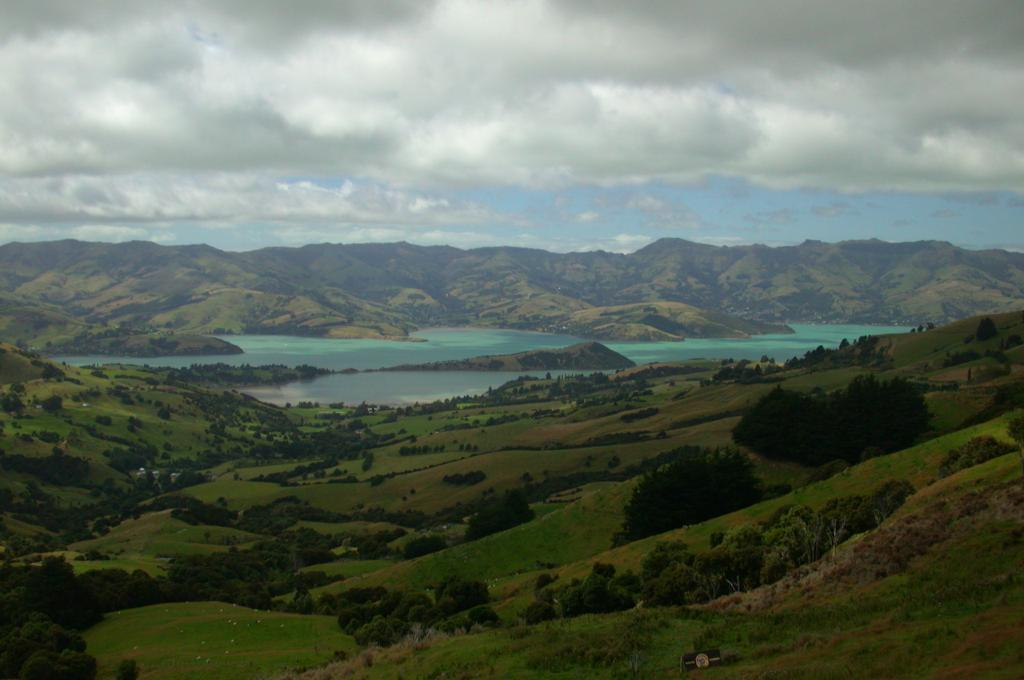
View of Port Louis Philippe, the oldest French colony in the South Pacific, referred to nowadays by its indigenous name Akaroa

Port Louis Philippe (Akaroa), the oldest French colony in the South Pacific and the oldest town in the Canterbury Region of the New Zealand's South Island was named in honour of Louis Philippe, who was king at the time the colony was established on 18 August 1840. Louis Philippe had been instrumental in supporting the settlement project. The company responsible for the endeavour received Louis Philippe's signature on 11 December 1839 as well as his permission to carry out the voyage in line with his policy of supporting colonial expansion and the construction of a second empire which had first commenced under him in Algeria around a decade earlier. The British Lieutenant-Governor Captain William Hobson subsequently went on to claim sovereignty over Port Louis Philippe.

As a further honorific gesture to Louis Philippe and his Orléanist branch of the Bourbons, the ship on which the settlers sailed to found the eponymous colony of Port Louis Philippe was named the Comte de Paris after Louis Philippe's beloved infant grandson, Prince Philippe d'Orléans, Count of Paris who was born on 24 August 1838.

== Issue ==
Name	Picture	Birth	Death	Notes
Ferdinand Philippe, Duke of Orléans		3 September 1810	13 July 1842	Married Duchess Helene of Mecklenburg-Schwerin, had issue.
Louise d'Orléans		3 April 1812	11 October 1850	Married King Leopold I of Belgium, had issue.
Princess Marie d'Orléans		12 April 1813	6 January 1839	Married Duke Alexander of Württemberg, had issue.
Louis, Duke of Nemours		25 October 1814	26 June 1896	Married Princess Victoria of Saxe-Coburg and Gotha, had issue.
Princess Françoise Louise Caroline d'Orléans		26 March 1816	20 May 1818	Died aged two. Baptised on 20 July 1816, with Emperor Francis I of Austria as her godfather.
Clémentine d'Orléans		6 March 1817	16 February 1907	Married Prince August of Saxe-Coburg and Gotha, had issue.
François, Prince of Joinville		14 August 1818	16 June 1900	Married Princess Francisca of Brazil, had issue.
Charles d'Orléans		1 January 1820	25 July 1828	Died aged eight.
Henri, Duke of Aumale		16 January 1822	7 May 1897	Married Princess Caroline Auguste of the Two Sicilies, had issue-but no descendants survive.
Antoine, Duke of Montpensier		31 July 1824	4 February 1890	Married Infanta Luisa Fernanda, Duchess of Montpensier, had issue.

== Ancestry ==
Ancestors of Louis Philippe I

8. Louis, Duke of Orléans
4. Louis Philippe I, Duke of Orléans
9. Auguste of Baden-Baden
2. Louis Philippe II, Duke of Orléans
10. Louis Armand II, Prince of Conti
5. Louise Henriette de Bourbon
11. Louise Élisabeth de Bourbon
1. Louis Philippe I of France
12. Louis Alexandre, Count of Toulouse
6. Louis Jean Marie, Duke of Penthièvre
13. Marie Victoire de Noailles
3. Louise Marie Adélaïde de Bourbon
14. Francesco III d'Este, Duke of Modena
7. Maria Teresa Felicitas d'Este
15. Charlotte Aglaé d'Orléans

== See also ==
- Louis Philippe style
- List of works by James Pradier
- Paris under Louis Philippe
- Lieutenant-General (France)
- Origins of the French Foreign Legion
- Port Louis Philippe (Akaroa)

=== Namesakes ===
- Louis Philippe, Crown Prince of Belgium (1833–1834), grandson by his daughter Queen Louise of the Belgians
- Luís Filipe, Prince Royal of Portugal (1887–1908), great-great-grandson and heir to the Portuguese Throne

== Notes ==
Louis Philippe I House of Orléans Cadet branch of the House of Bourbon Born: 6 October 1773 Died: 26 August 1850
Regnal titles
Preceded by Charles X as King of France	King of the French; 9 August 1830 – 24 February 1848	Vacant Monarchy abolished Title next held by Napoleon III as Emperor of the French
Preceded by Charles X of France	Co-Prince of Andorra with Simó de Guardiola; 9 August 1830 – 24 February 1848	Succeeded by Louis-Napoleon Bonaparte
French nobility
Preceded by Louis Philippe II	Duke of Orléans; 6 November 1793 – 9 August 1830	Succeeded by Ferdinand Philippe
Political offices
Preceded by Charles X	French Head of State; 9 August 1830 – 24 February 1848	Succeeded by Jacques-Charles Dupont de l'Eure
