= István Koháry =

István II. Koháry Count
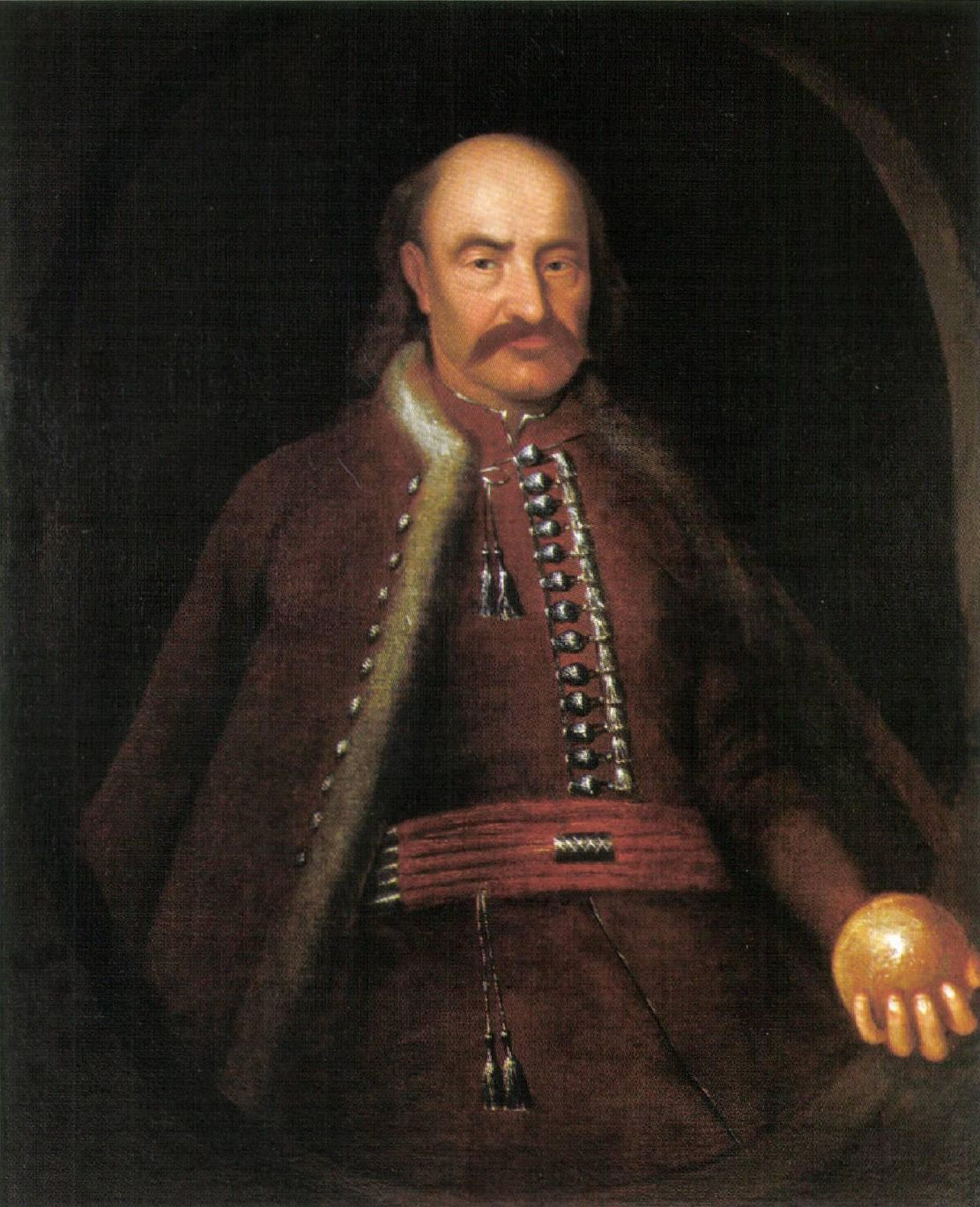
- Born: 12 March 1649; Csábrág Castle
- Died: 29 March 1731 (aged 82); Csábrág Castle
- Resting place: Hronský Beňadik Abbey
- Parent(s): Istvan Koháry; Judith Balassa de Gyarma.

Count István II. Koháry (Csábrág, 1649–1731), the poet, politician and general was a member of the Hungarian House of Koháry.

== Life ==
István Koháry was the eldest son of István Koháry (1616–1664) and the Hungarian noble woman Judith of Balsassa. His father died when he was 15. After studying at the Jesuit university of Trnava he became the hereditary commander of Fülek castle. During the uprise of Imre Thököly he was sieged there in the year 1682 for several weeks and finally taken hostage by Thököly. Koháry refused to side with him and stayed loyal to the Habsburg king Leopold. For the next three years he remained imprisoned by the Kuruc. After the Battle of Vienna 1683 the Turks and with them also Thököly were driven out of Hungary and 1685 István became free. He was received with all honours at the Imperial court of Vienna. Emperor Leopold called him Speculum Fidelitatis, the mirror of loyalty and awarded him the title Count and the hereditary headship of Hont County. 1714 he became Judge royal, the second-highest judge, preceded only by the palatine, in the Kingdom of Hungary.

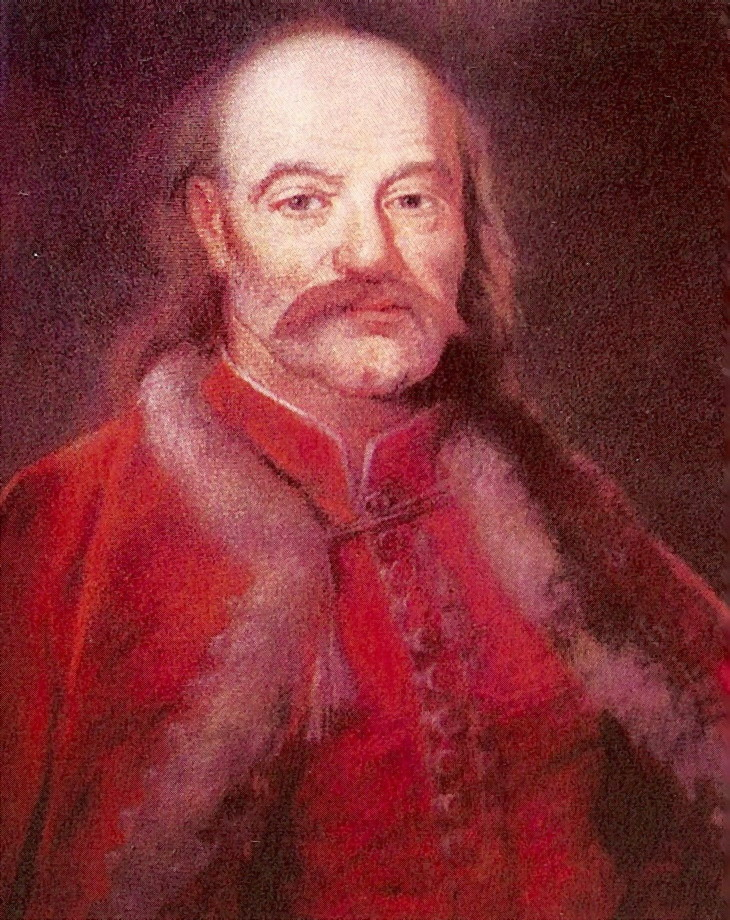

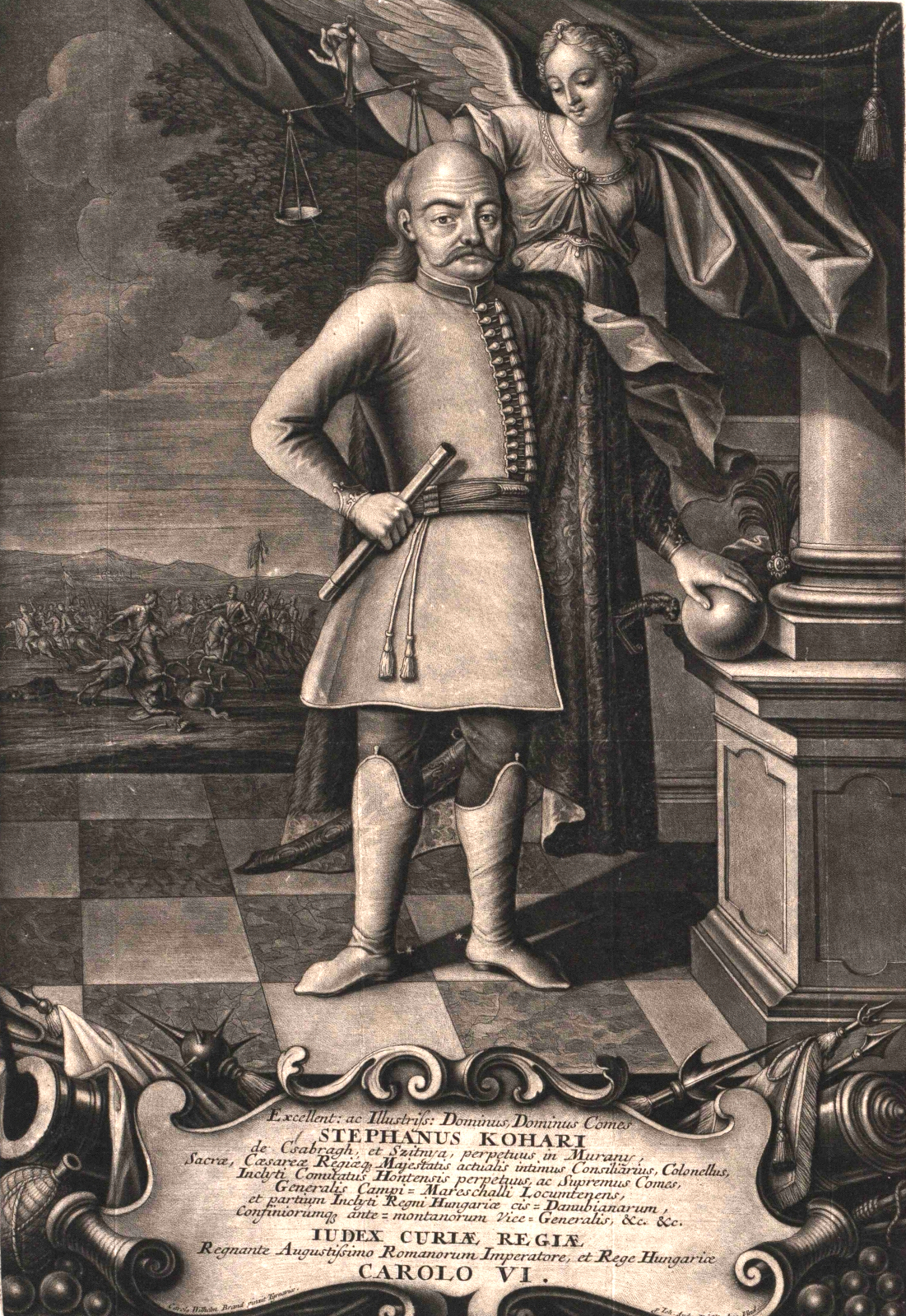

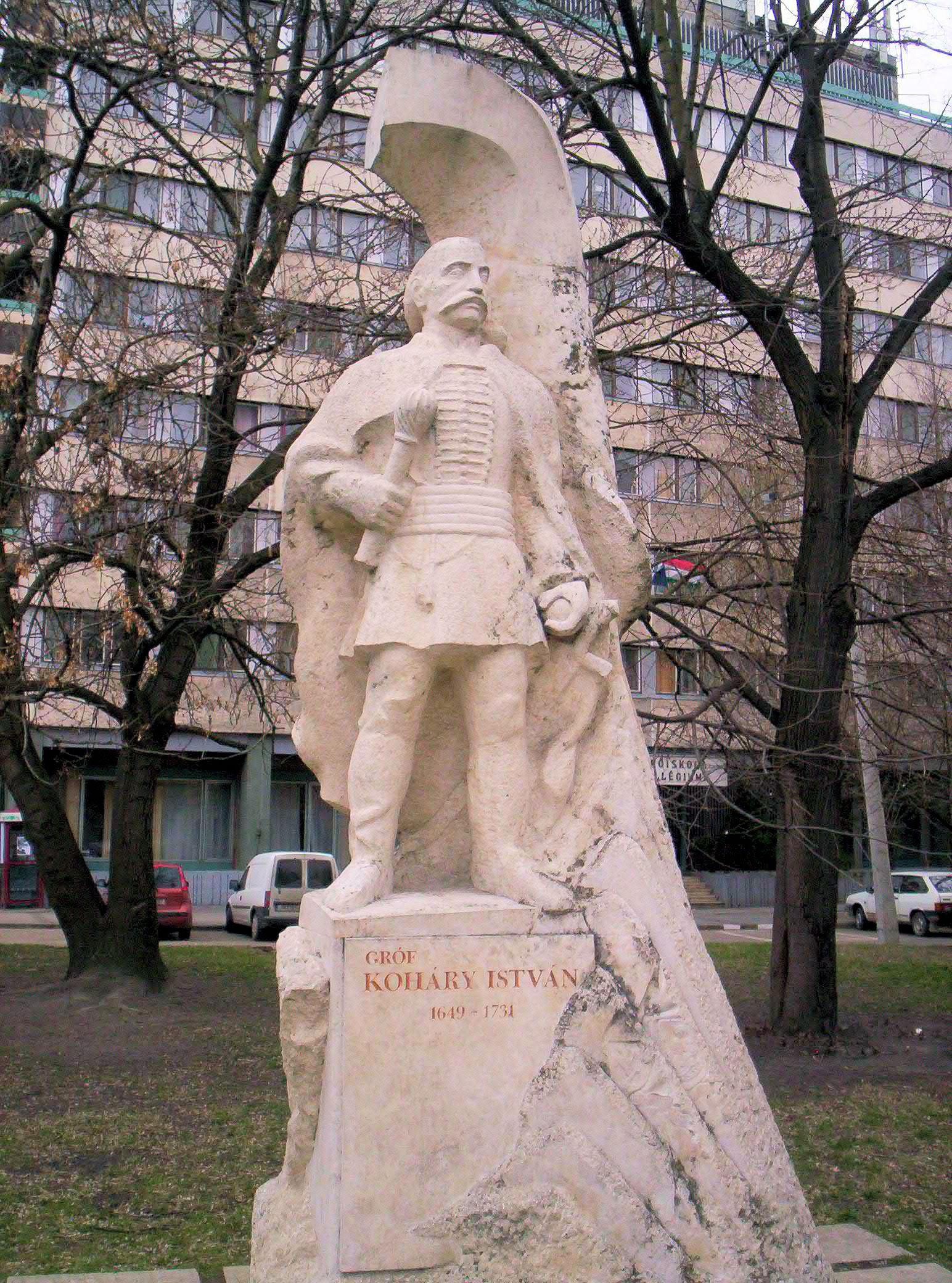
István Koháry monument in Kecskemét

== Work ==
During his captivity István began to write poems, unusual for his time not in Latin, but in Hungarian language.

== Death and legacy ==
István Koháry remained unmarried and died highly honoured at the age of 82 at Csábrág castle. In his testament he founded a Fideicommis and stated that every head of it have to be a Catholic. His nephew Andreas Josef Koháry (1694–1757) became his heir. István Koháry was buried in the family crypt at the abbey of Hronský Beňadik. 1909 Tsar Ferdinand of Bulgaria commissioned a marble monument for the church to honour his famous ancestor.

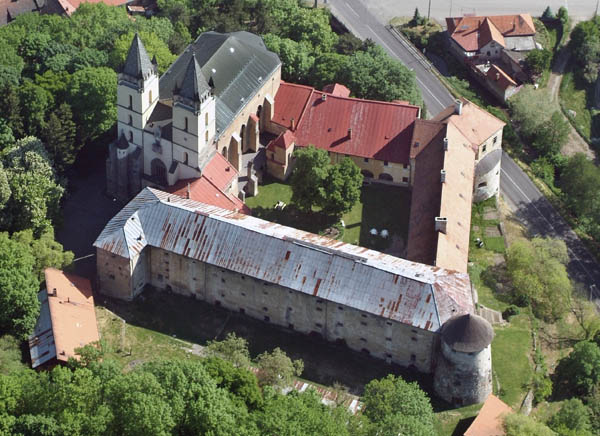
Hronsky Benadik Abbey

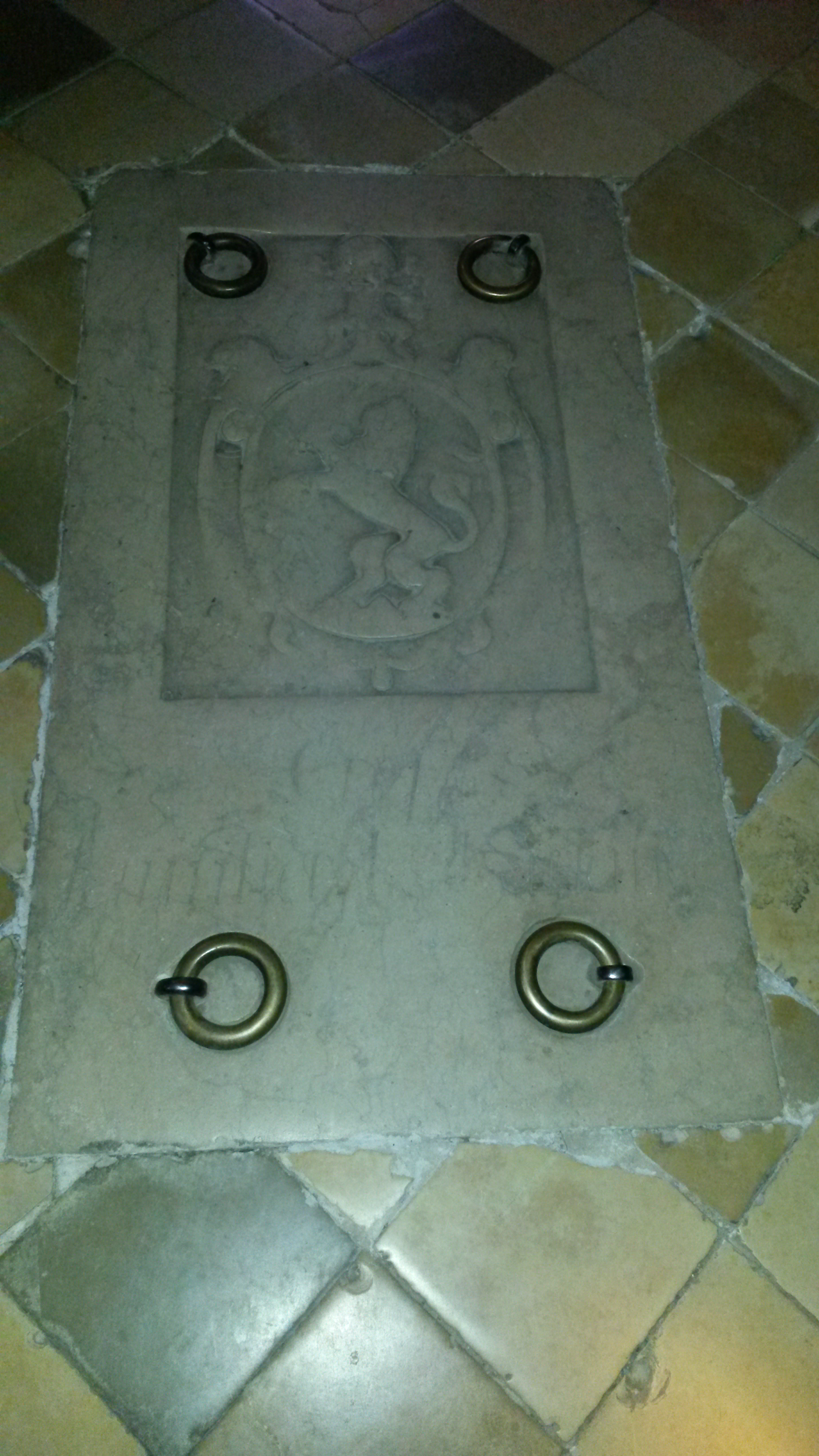
Entrance to the Koháry crypt

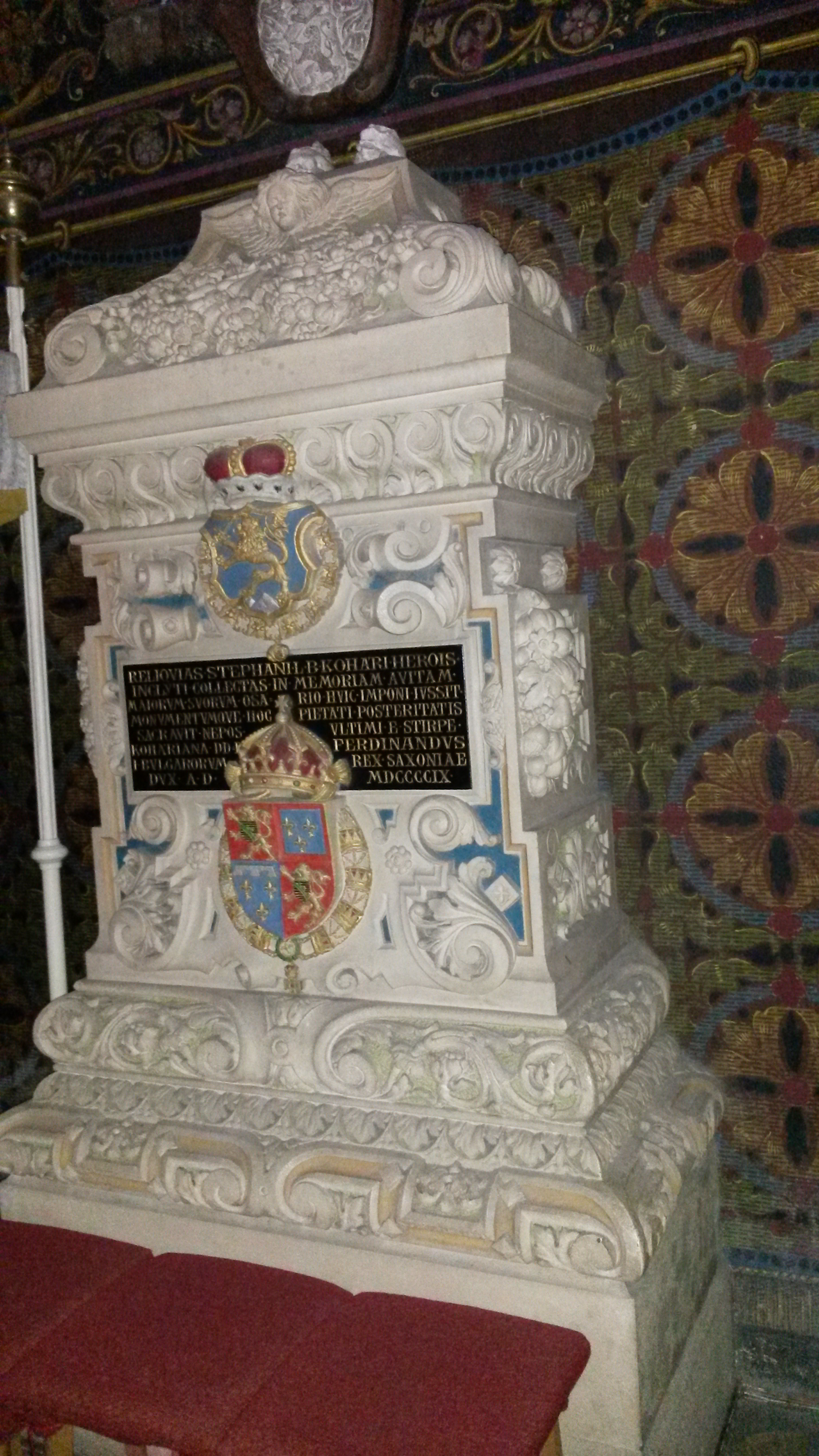
Istvan Monument in the abbey

== Ancestry ==
Ancestors of István Koháry

8. Imre Koháry
4. Peter Koháry, Baron Koháry de Csábrág (1564–1629)
9. Katalin Jákóffy de Raho et Szuh
2. Istvan Koháry, Baron Koháry de Csábrág
10. György Vethle
5. Regina Vethle +1616
11. Anna Maria Jokkin
1. Istvan (Stephan) II, Count Koháry de Csábrág
12. András Balassa de Gyarmat, +after 1576
6. Imre Balassa de Gyarmat +ca 1633
13. Anna Mérey de Kaposmére
3. Judith Balassa de Gyarmat+1684
14. Tamás Bosnyák de Magyarbél (1572-1634)
7. Judit Bosnyák de Magyarbél
15. Katalin Zádory

== See also ==
- Ferenc József Koháry
