= Countess Maria Antonia von Waldstein zu Wartenberg =

Bohemian noblewoman

Countess Maria Antonia von Waldstein
- Born: Maria Antonie Gräfin von Waldstein Herrin zu Wartenberg; 4 March 1771; Vienna, Archduchy of Austria, Holy Roman Empire
- Died: 17 January 1854 (aged 82); Vienna, Austrian Empire
- Title: Countess von Waldstein; Princess Koháry de Csábrág et Szitnya
- Spouse: Ferenc József, Prince Koháry de Csábrág et Szitnya
- Children: Ferenc (1792–1798); Mária Antónia (1797–1862)
- Parent(s): Count Georg Christian von Waldstein; Countess Elisabeth von Ulfeldt

Countess Maria Antonia von Waldstein (German: Maria Antonie Gräfin von Waldstein Herrin zu Wartenberg; 4 March 1771, Vienna – 17 January 1854, Vienna) was a Bohemian noblewoman who married into the Hungarian nobility.

== Biography ==
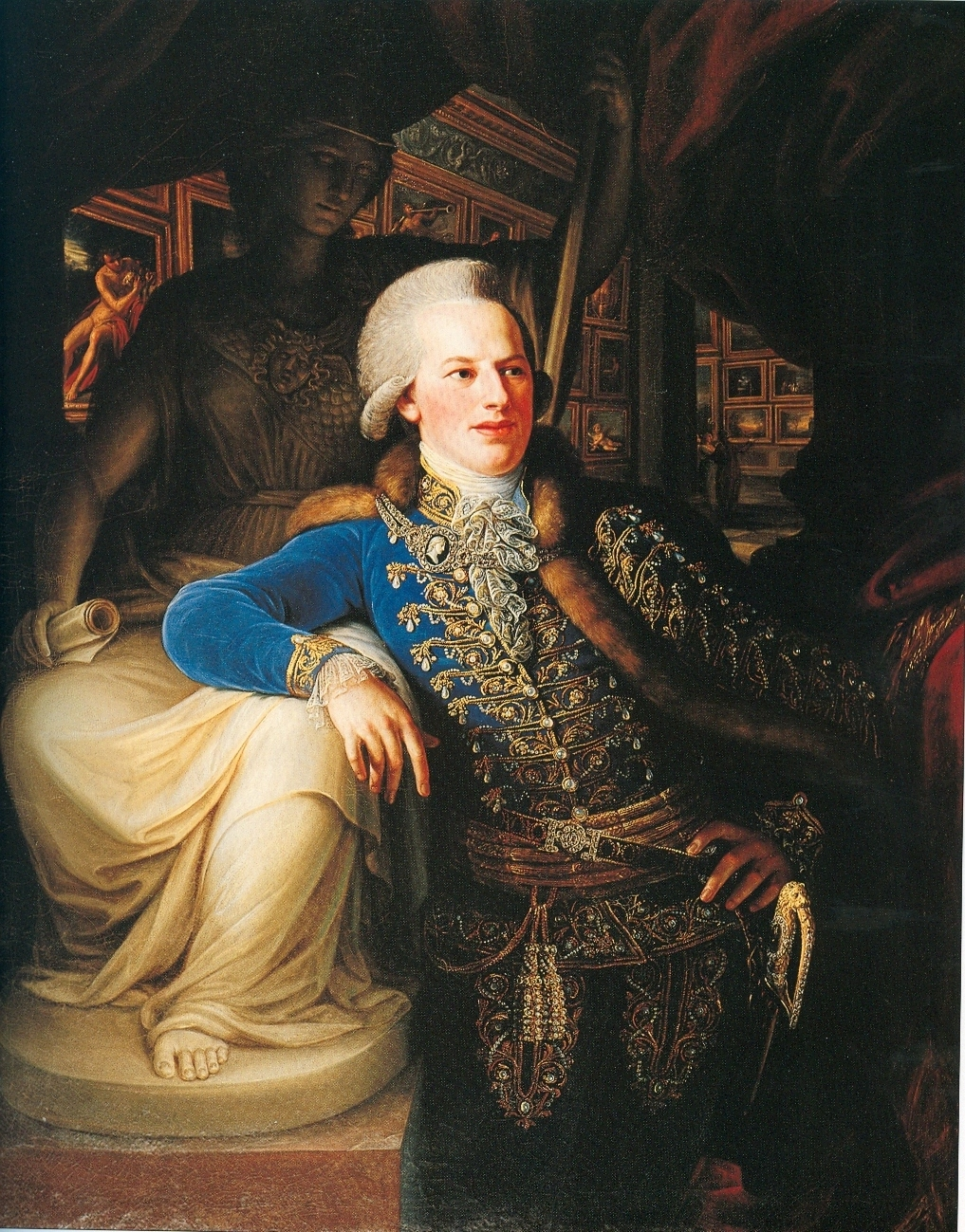
Antonia's husband, Ferenc József, Prince Koháry

Born on 4 March 1771 in Vienna, into a family of ancient Bohemian nobility, Antonia was the fourth child of Count Georg Christian von Waldstein (1743–1791) and his wife, Countess Elisabeth von Ulfeldt (1747–1791). She was the great-granddaughter of the notorious Count Corfitz Ulfeldt. By birth, she was a member of the prominent House of Waldstein.

On 13 February 1792 in Vienna, Antonia married the Hungarian nobleman Ferenc József, Prince Koháry de Csábrág et Szitnya, a member of the enormously affluent House of Koháry, with whom she had two children – Ferenc (1792–1798) and Mária Antónia (1797–1862), who married the German Prince Ferdinand of Saxe-Coburg and Gotha and bore four children. Mária Antónia was the mother of King Ferdinand II of Portugal and grandmother of King Ferdinand I of Bulgaria. On 15 November 1815, when Emperor Francis I of Austria granted her husband the hereditary title of Fürst von Koháry de Csábrág et Szitnya, Maria Antonia became Princess Koháry by marriage.

== Death ==
Princess Antonia died on 17 January 1854 in Vienna.
