= Princess Maria Antonia Koháry of Csábrág and Szitnya =

Hungarian noblewoman

Princess Mária Antónia
- Princess of Saxe-Coburg and Gotha
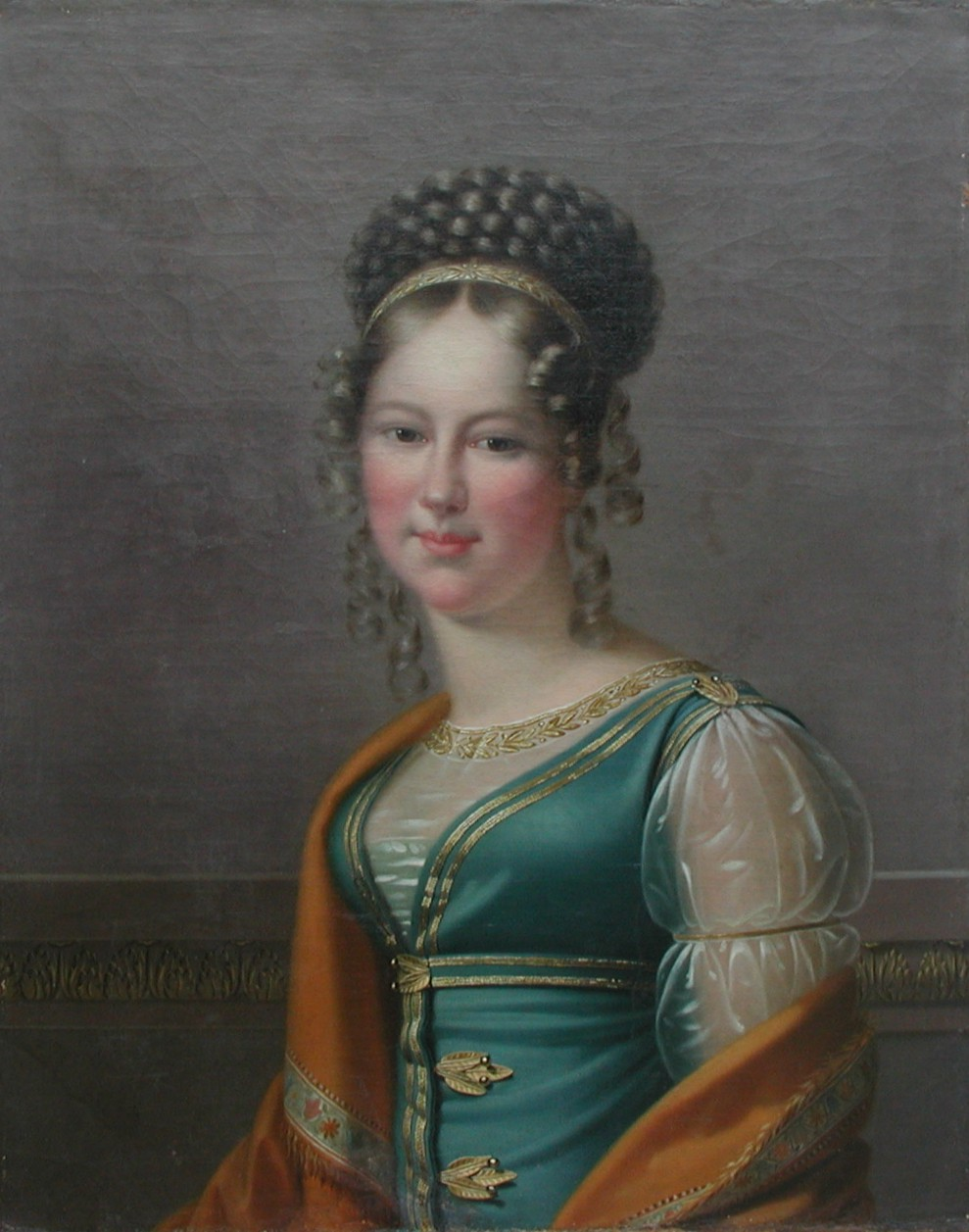
- Born: 2 July 1797; Buda, Budapest, Kingdom of Hungary
- Died: 25 September 1862 (aged 65); Palais Coburg, Vienna, Empire of Austria
- Burial: Mausoleum at Friedhof am Glockenberg, Coburg
- Spouse: Prince Ferdinand of Saxe-Coburg and Gotha (m. 1815; died 1851)
- Issue: Ferdinand II of Portugal; August, Prince of Saxe-Coburg and Gotha-Koháry; Princess Victoria, Duchess of Nemours; Prince Leopold
Names
- Mária Antónia Gabriella Koháry de Csábrág et Szitnya
- House: Koháry; Saxe-Coburg and Gotha-Koháry (co-founder)
- Father: Ferenc József, Prince Koháry de Csábrág et Szitnya
- Mother: Countess Maria Antonia von Waldstein-Wartenberg

Princess Mária Antónia Gabriella Koháry de Csábrág et Szitnya (Hungarian: csábrági és szitnyai herceg Koháry Mária Antónia Gabriella; 2 July 1797 – 25 September 1862) was a Hungarian noblewoman and the ancestor of several European monarchs. She was the sole heiress of the House of Koháry, which belonged to one of the three largest landowners in Hungary.

== Early life ==
She was born in Buda, as Countess Maria Antonia Koháry de Csábrág et Szitnya, the second child of Franz Josef, Count Koháry de Csábrág et Szitnya and his wife, Countess Maria Antonia von Waldstein-Wartenberg. Her older brother Franz died, aged five, on 19 April 1798. This left Antónia as the sole heir to the vast fortune of the House of Koháry.

== Life ==
On 30 November 1815, in Vienna, Maria Antonia married Prince Ferdinand of Saxe-Coburg and Gotha. He was an elder brother of Prince Leopold, future King of the Belgians but then consort to Princess Charlotte of Wales, who was expected to inherit the crown of Great Britain, and also elder brother of the Duchess of Kent, mother of the future Queen Victoria. To make her a suitable bride for a prince, the emperor had raised her father (whose ancestors had been created counts in the Hungarian nobility in July 1685 and barons in February 1616) to Prince Koháry of Csábrág and Szitnya in Austria's nobility on 15 November 1815, two weeks before the wedding, thereby allowing her to come to her bridesgroom already a princess.

In 1826 at the death of her father Maria Antonia inherited over 150000 hectares of land in present-day Lower Austria, Hungary and Slovakia, including estates, forests, mines and factories. According to a list of assets appended to the marriage contract of her son, Prince August, at the time of his marriage to Princess Clémentine of Orléans in 1843, the Koháry properties included the enormous Palais Koháry in the center of Vienna and several Viennese manors, a summer home and lands at Ebenthal, Lower Austria, estates in Austria at Velm, Durnkrut, Walterskirchen, Bohmischdrut and Althoflein, as well as a dozen manors in Hungary, the domaine of Kiralytia, and a mansion at Pest. As late as 1868, when Antónia's grandson Prince Ferdinand, Duke of Alencon, married, it was estimated that he and his three siblings stood to inherit a total of a million francs just from their share of their late grandmother's estate. Until the first world war, her descendants, the Koháry branch of the House of Saxe-Coburg and Gotha, were among the three largest landowners in Hungary.

Maria Antonia died in Vienna in 1862, and was buried in the ducal mausoleum on the Friedhof am Glockenberg, (Glockenberg cemetery) in Coburg.

== Marriage and issue ==
She and her husband became the parents of four children:

- Prince Ferdinand of Saxe-Coburg and Gotha (1816–1885); he became King consort of Portugal as Ferdinand II in 1836; his grandson Ferdinand became King of Romania in 1914
- Prince August of Saxe-Coburg and Gotha (1818–1881); his son Ferdinand was elected Prince of Bulgaria in 1887 and was elevated to Tsar of Bulgaria in 1908
- Princess Victoria of Saxe-Coburg and Gotha (1822–1857); her son Gaston was the consort of Isabel, Princess Imperial, daughter of the Emperor Pedro II of Brazil.
- Prince Leopold of Saxe-Coburg and Gotha (1824–1884)

The couple were also ancestors of Pedro V of Portugal, Luis I of Portugal, Charles I of Austria, Otto von Habsburg, Michael I of Romania, Peter II of Yugoslavia, Ferdinand I of Bulgaria, Boris III of Bulgaria, Simeon II of Bulgaria, Henri, Count of Paris, Prince Boris of Leiningen and Prince Hermann Friedrich of Leiningen, Pedro de Alcântara, Prince of Grão-Pará, and members of the Imperial House of Brazil alive today.

== Honours ==
- Kingdom of Portugal: Dame of the Order of Queen Saint Isabel, 9 December 1835
