= Čabraď (nature reserve) =

Nature reserve in Slovakia

Coordinates: 48.242°N 19.099°E

- IUCN category Ia (strict nature reserve)
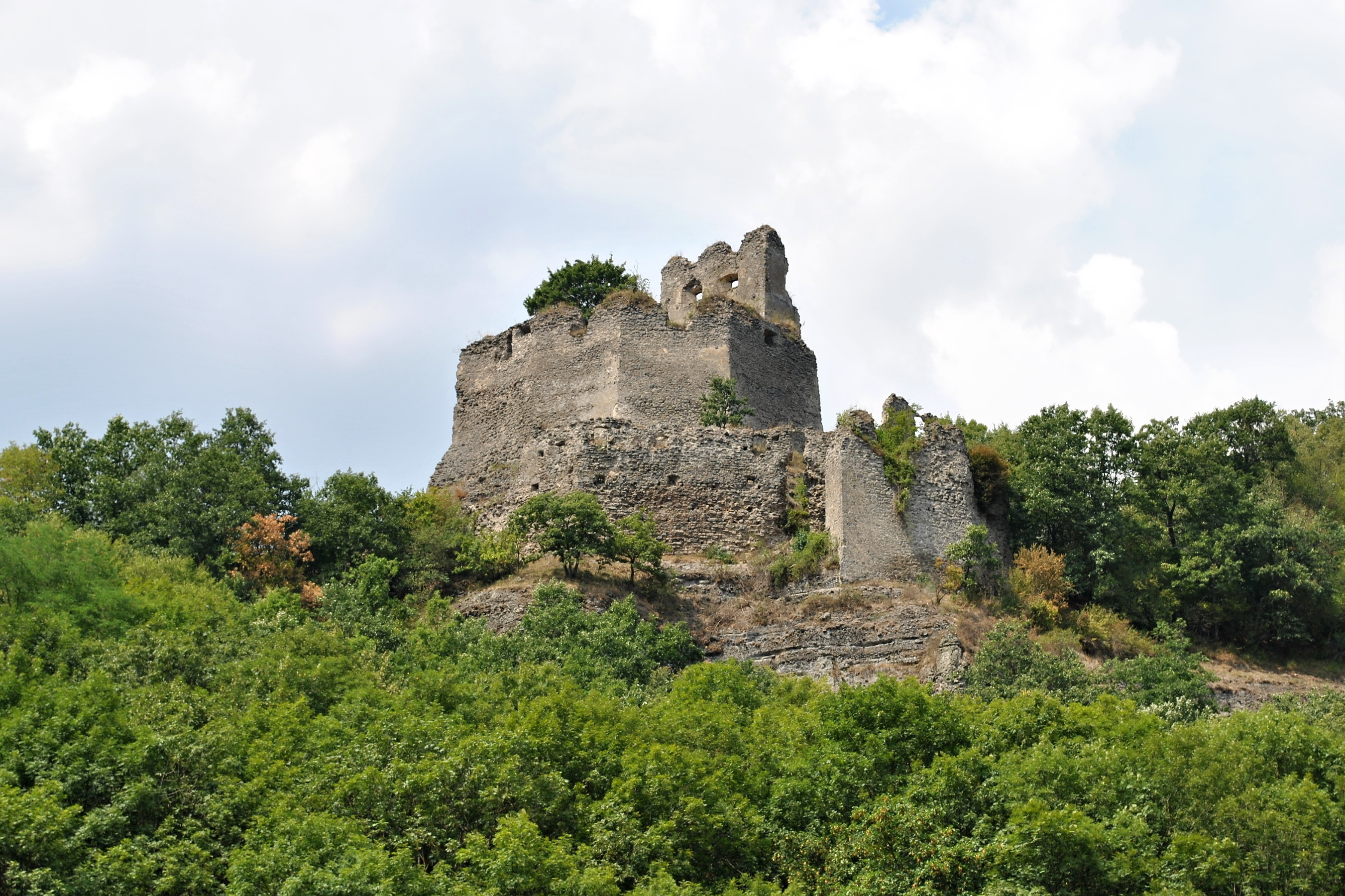
- Čabraď
- Interactive map of Čabraď
- Area: 1.41 km^{2} (0.54 sq mi)
- Established: 1967

Čabraď is a nature reserve in the Slovak municipality of Čabradský Vrbovok in the Krupina District. The nature reserve covers an area of 141 hectares (350 acres) in the Litava stream valley. It has a protection level of 5 under the Slovak nature protection system and an IUCN-category Ia. The area was declared as a nature reserve for the protection of the richest habitat of reptiles on the territory of the Slovak republic for scientific research and educational purposes.
