= House of Koháry =

Hungarian noble family

- Country: Kingdom of Hungary; Archduchy of Austria
- Founded: 11th century
- Founder: György Koháry
- Final ruler: Ferenc József Koháry
- Titles: Hungarian Counts; Austro-Hungarian Princes
- Dissolution: 1826, upon the death of Ferenc József Koháry
- Cadet branches: House of Saxe-Coburg and Gotha-Koháry (through female line)

The House of Koháry (Hungarian: Koháry-ház) was an ancient and wealthy Hungarian noble family with seats at Csábrág and Szitnya (now Čabraď and Sitno Castle) and the palace of Szentantal (now Svätý Anton, Slovakia).

== History ==
=== Origin ===
The origin of the family is in Zala County in Hungary. In 1470, a "Georg Koháry" is mentioned in the court of King Matthias I Corvinus. The first notable member of the family was Peter Koháry (1564–1629), who was rewarded as the Baron of Csábrág by Emperor Ferdinand II and became commander of the fortress of Érsekújvár. His son Stephan I Koháry (1616–1664) fought against the Turks and died in the battle of Léva.

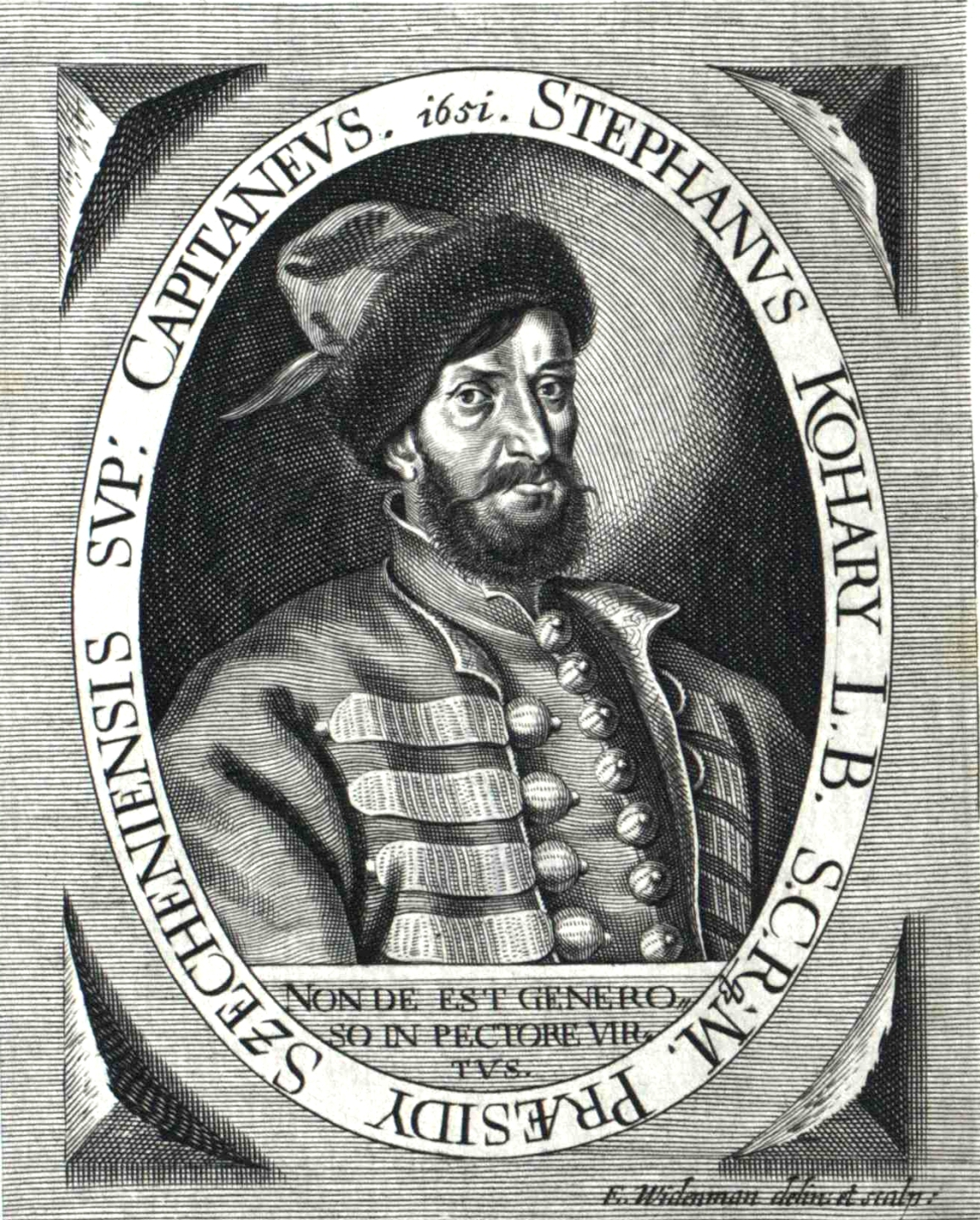
Stephan (Istvan) Kohary (1616–1664)

=== Counts and generals ===
In 1685, Stephan II Koháry (1649–1731) became the first count in his family. He fought against the Ottoman Empire and the Kuruc. After his death, his fortune went to his nephew Andreas Koháry (1694–1757). All Kohárys had been officers and generals of the Habsburg emperors.

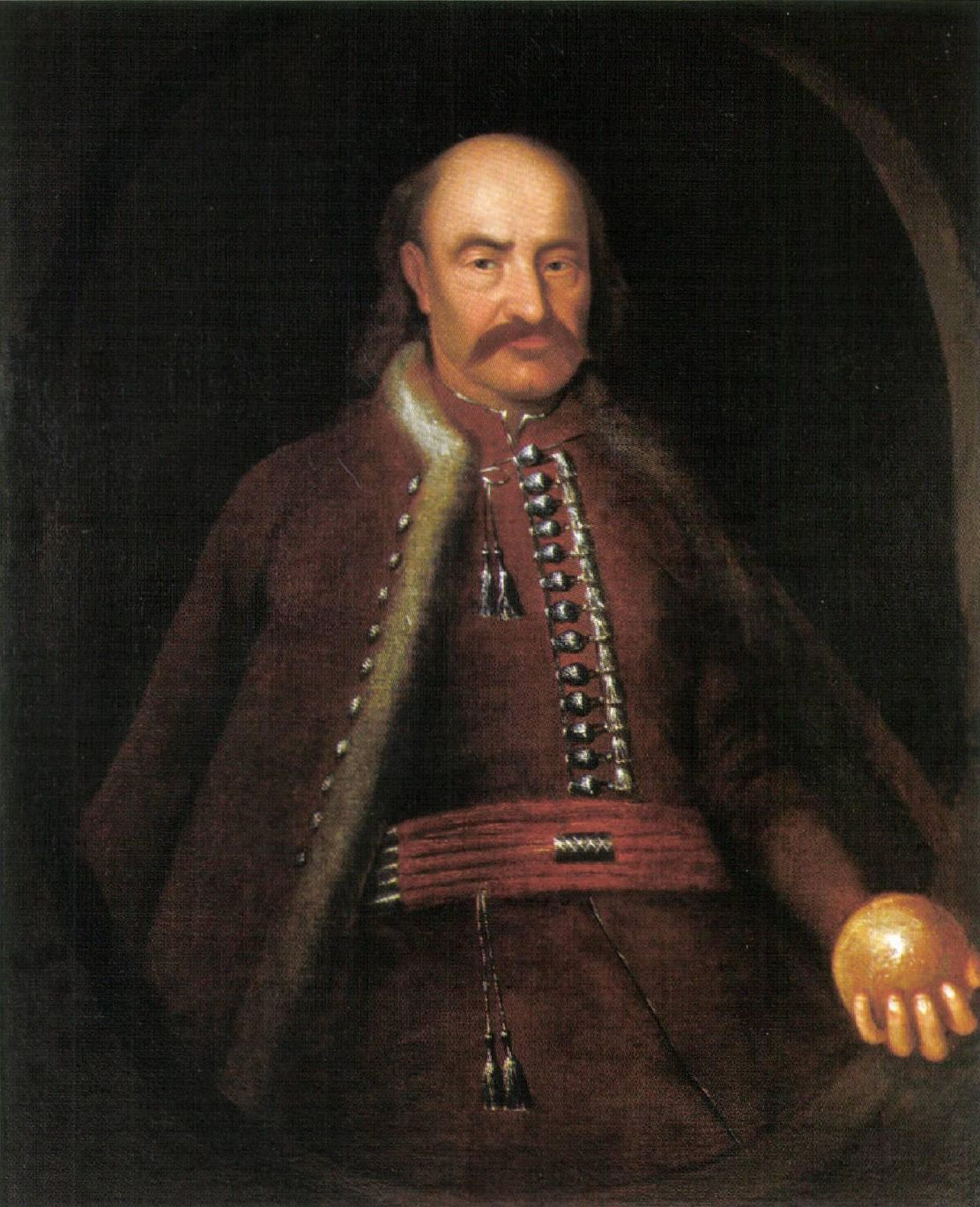
Stephan II Koháry (1649–1731)

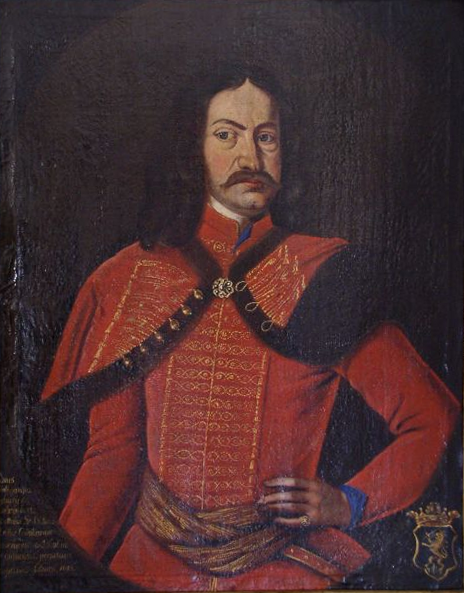
Wolfgang Koháry (1654–1704)

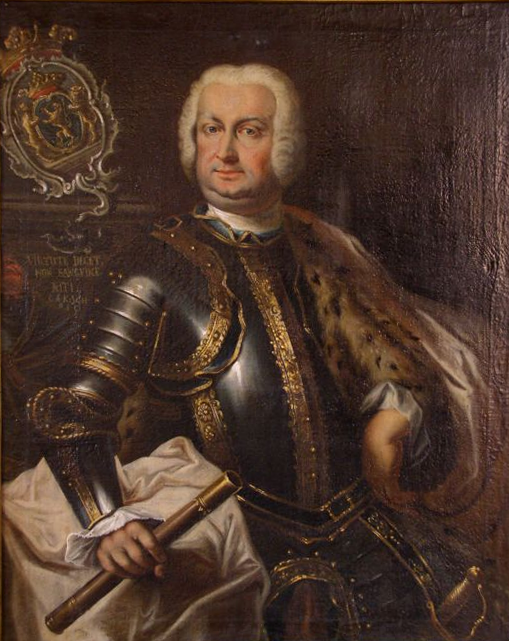
Andreas Koháry (1694–1757)

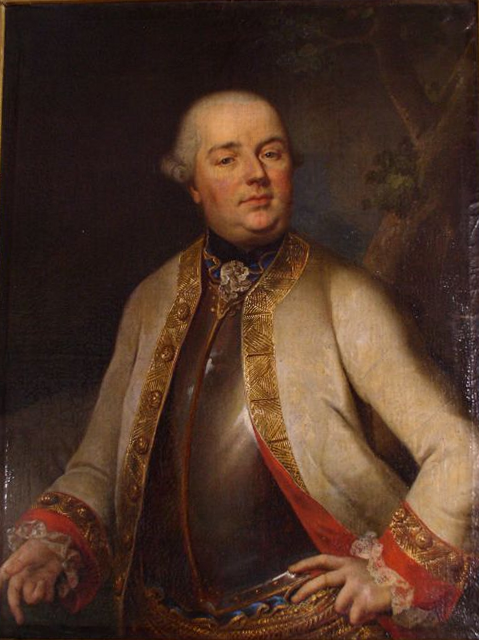
Nikolaus Koháry (1721–1769)

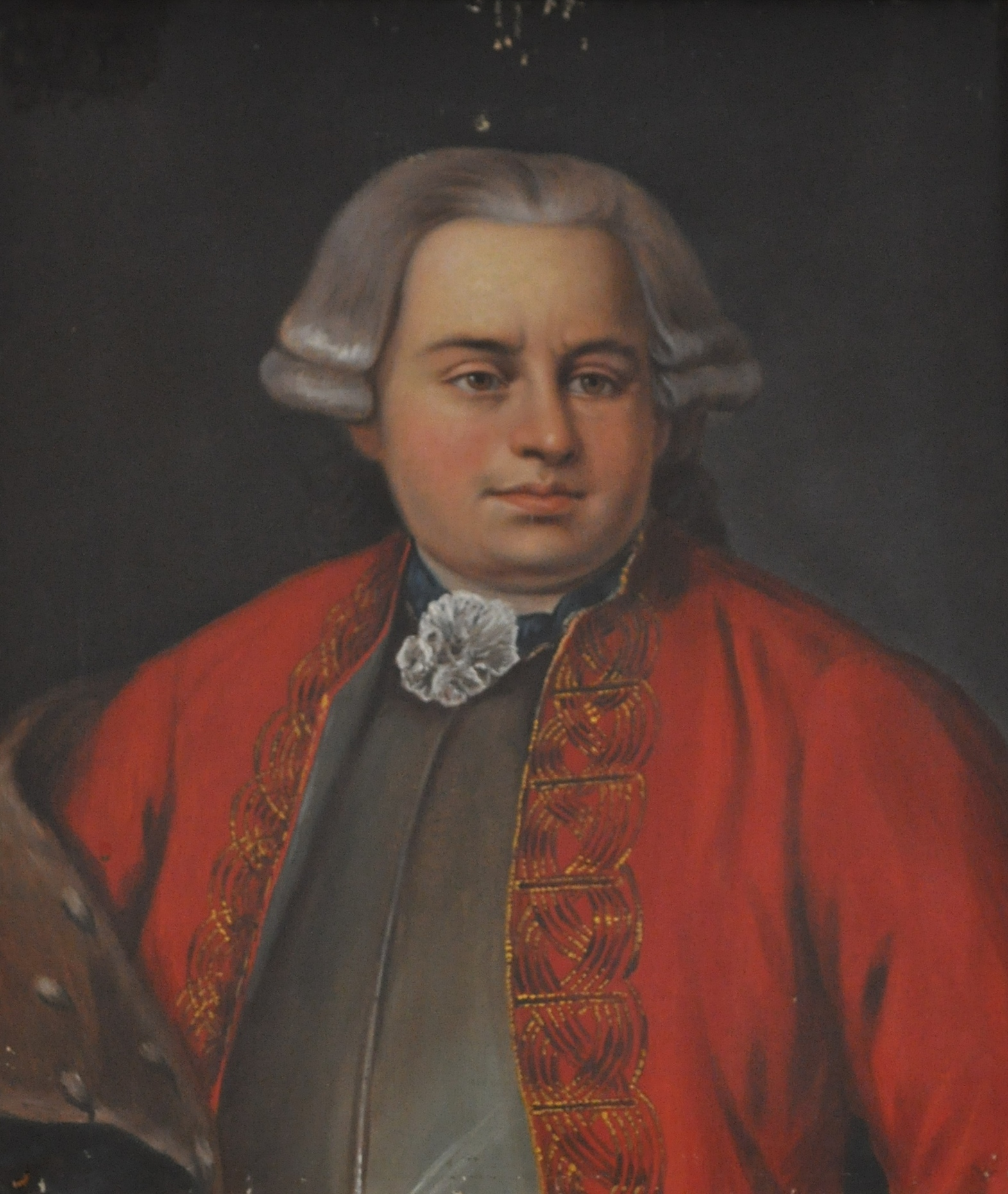
Ignaz Josef Koháry (1726–1777)

=== Princely title ===
On 15 November 1815, the head of the house, Ferenc József Koháry (1760–1826), who served as the Hungarian Chancellor, was given the title of Fürst von Koháry (Prince of Koháry) by Emperor Francis I of Austria.

==== House of Saxe-Coburg and Gotha-Koháry ====
Upon the death of Ferenc József, his only surviving child, a daughter named Mária Antónia (1797–1862), was proclaimed "heiress of the name" (fíúsított). When she married in 1816 (January 2), her husband Prince Ferdinand of Saxe-Coburg and Gotha took the name Saxe-Coburg and Gotha-Koháry. Among the descendants of Mária Antónia and Ferdinand are the last emperor of Austria (Charles I), the last four kings of Portugal (Pedro V, Luís I, Carlos I, Manuel II), and the last three tsars of Bulgaria (Ferdinand I, Boris III, Simeon II).

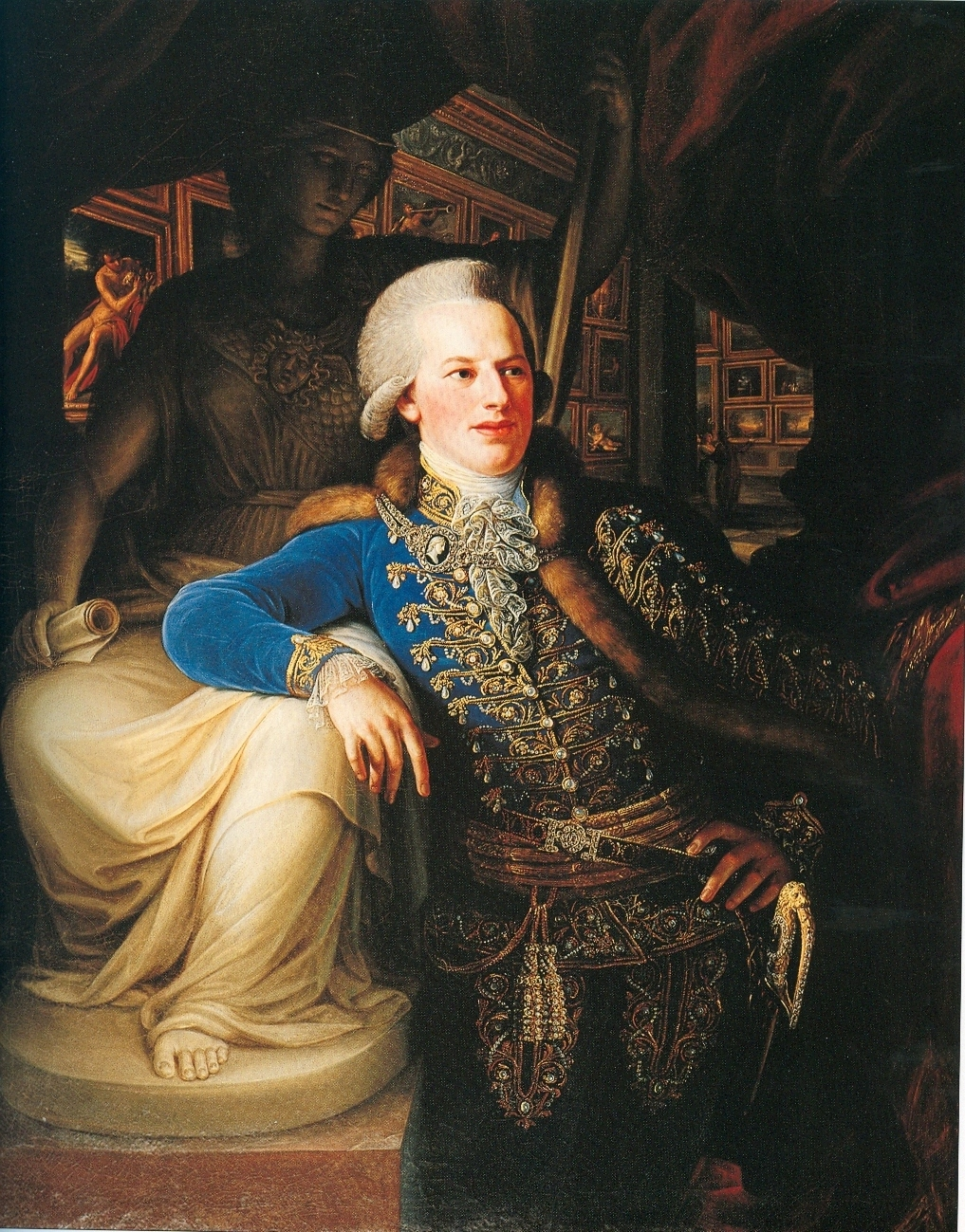
Ferenc József Koháry, first Prince von Koháry.

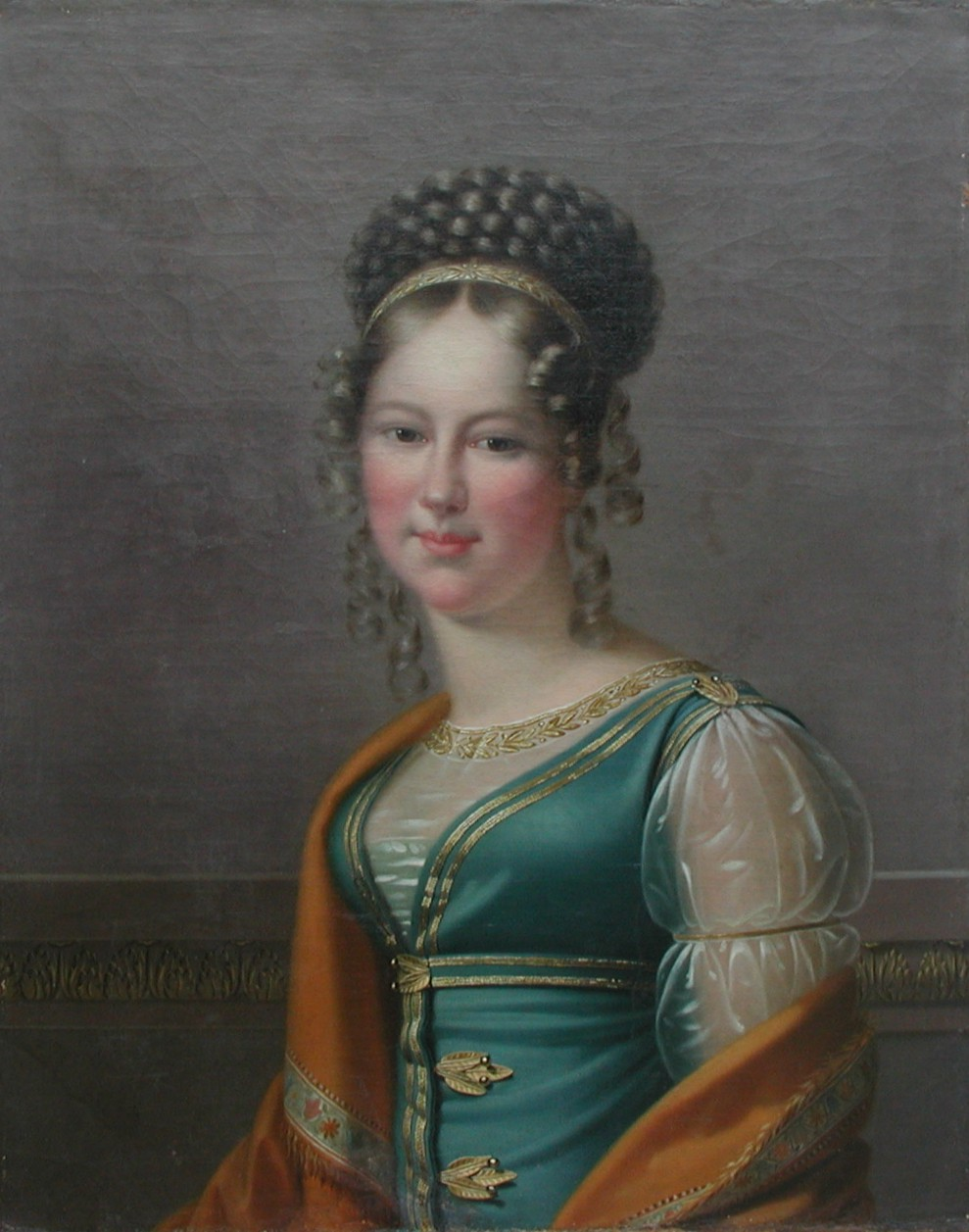
Maria Antonia Koháry, his daughter and heiress.

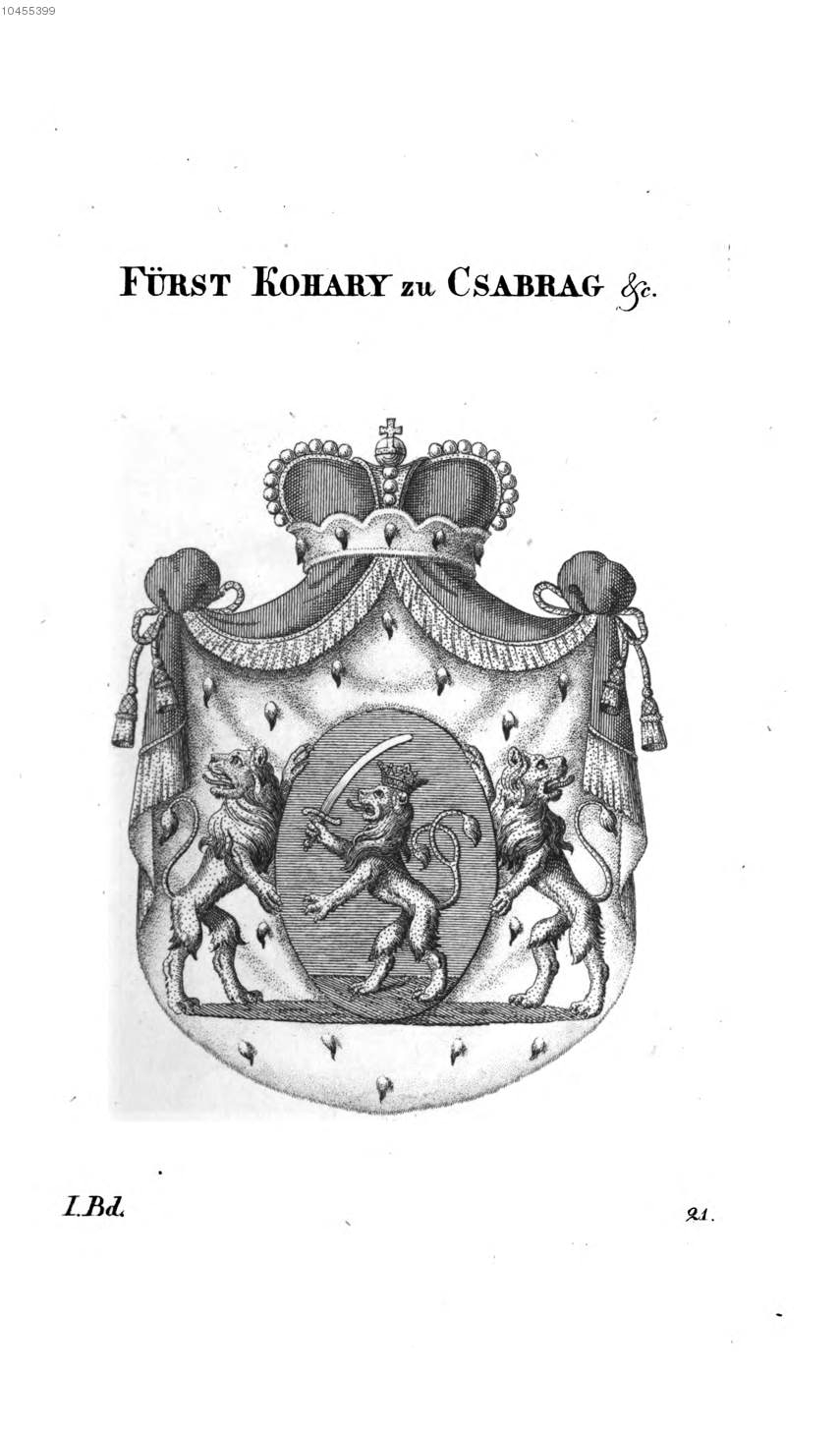
Princely arms

== Notable members of the family ==
- István Koháry (1649–1731)
- Ferenc József Koháry, Fürst von Koháry de Csábrág et Szitnya (1767–1826)
- Maria Antonia Koháry (1797–1862)

== Koháry palaces ==
The Kohárys belonged among the magnates of Hungary. Their holdings were calculated to be around 150,000 hectares, making Princess Maria Antonia Koháry one the richest heiresses in Europe at the time of her marriage to Prince Ferdinand of Saxe-Coburg and Gotha.

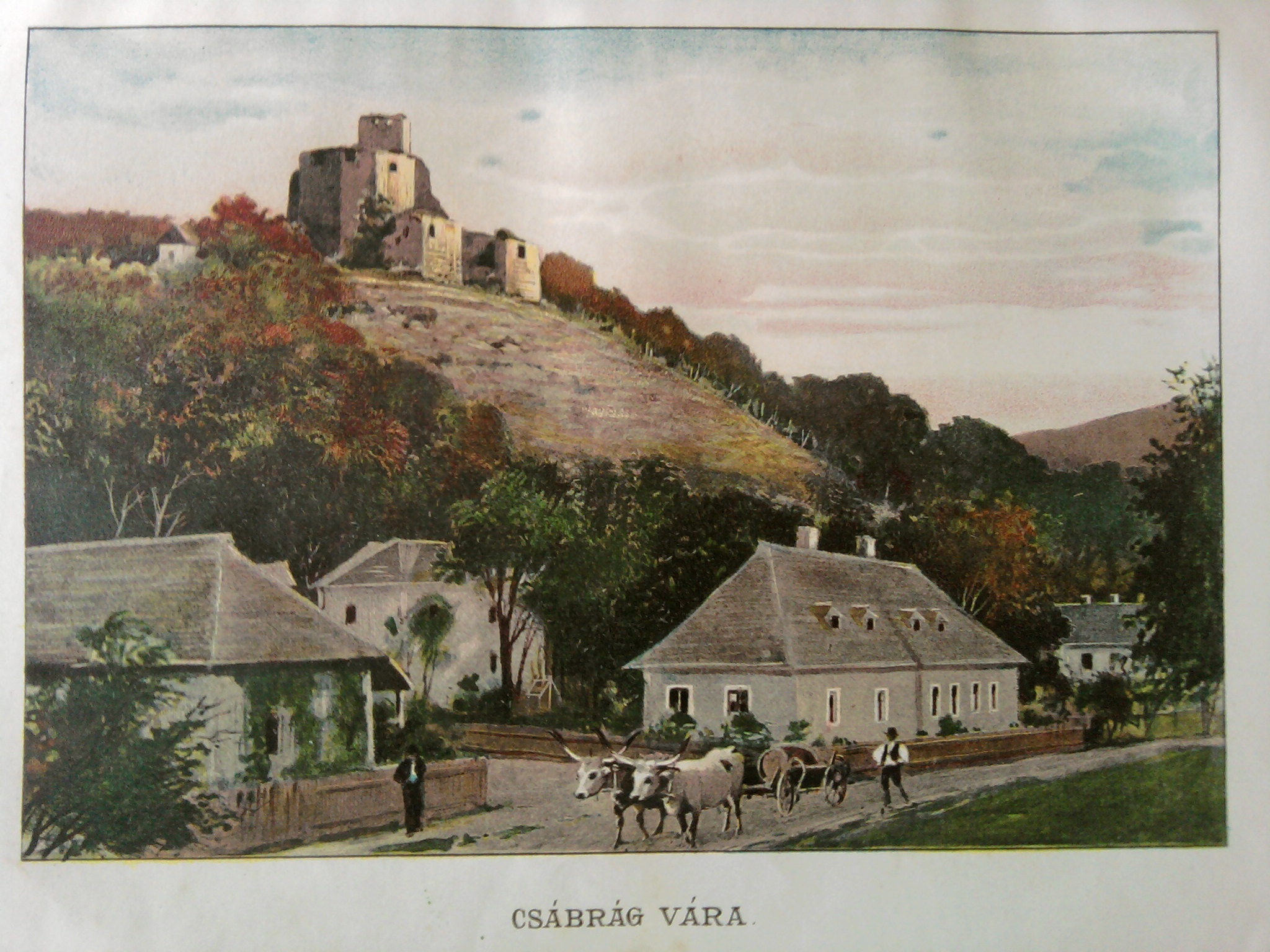
Čabraď castle, 1622 feoffed to Peter Koháry

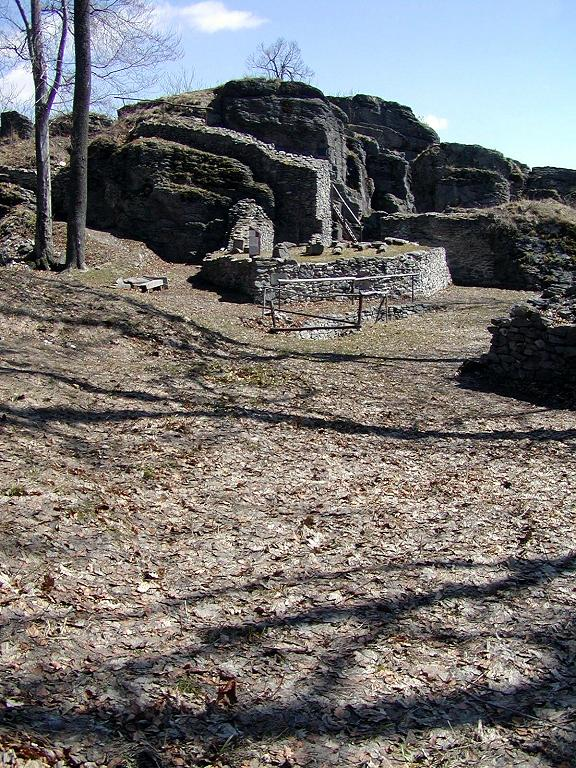
Sitno Castle feoffed 1629 to Peter Koháry, destroyed 1703 during Rákóczi's War of Independence

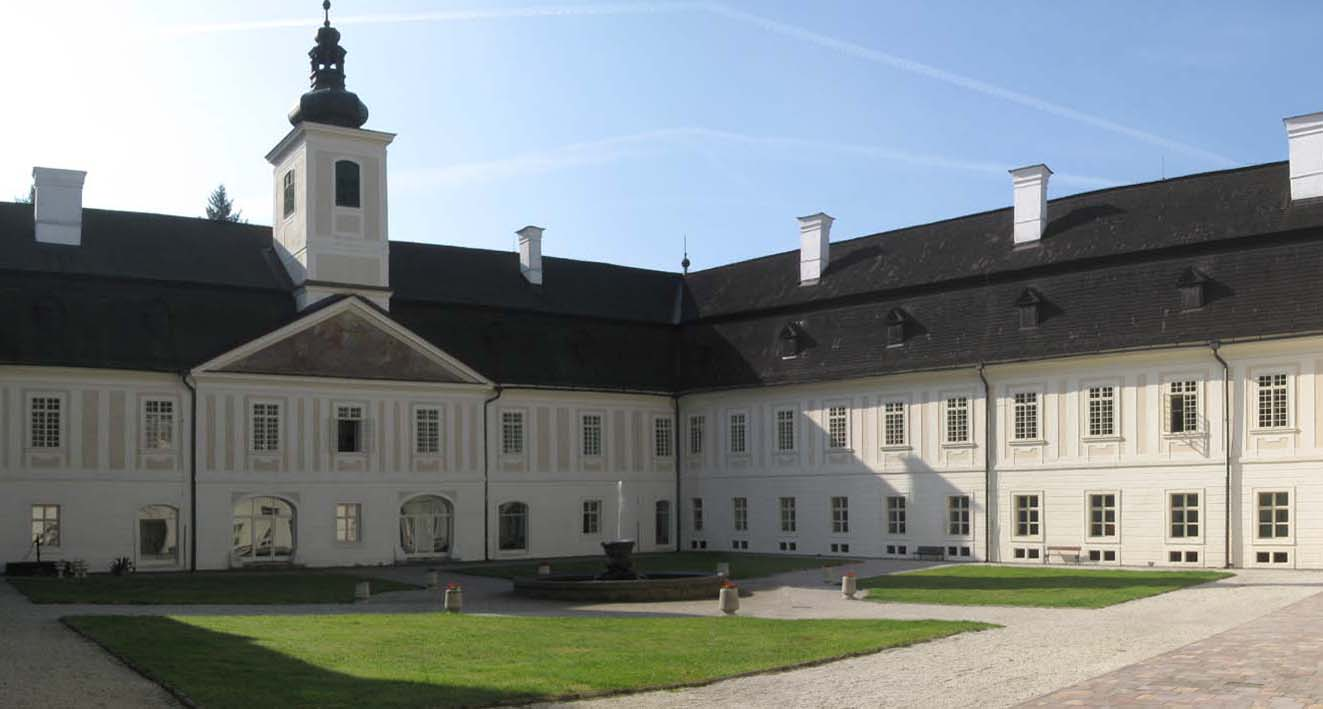
palace of Svätý Anton

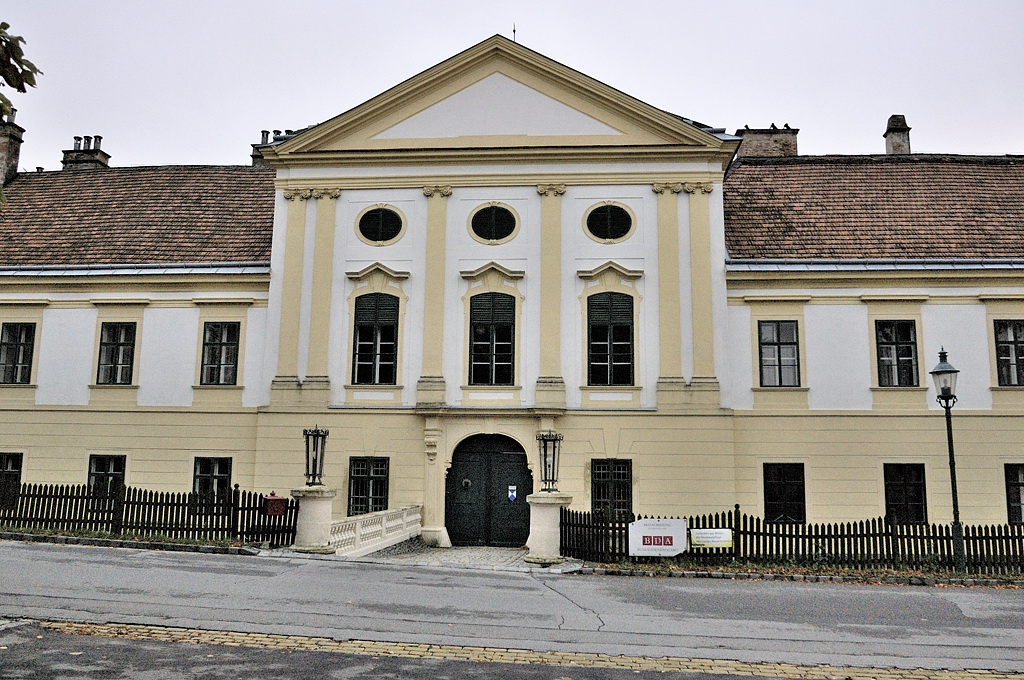
Ebenthal, Lower Austria, acquired 1722 by Count Andreas Koháry.

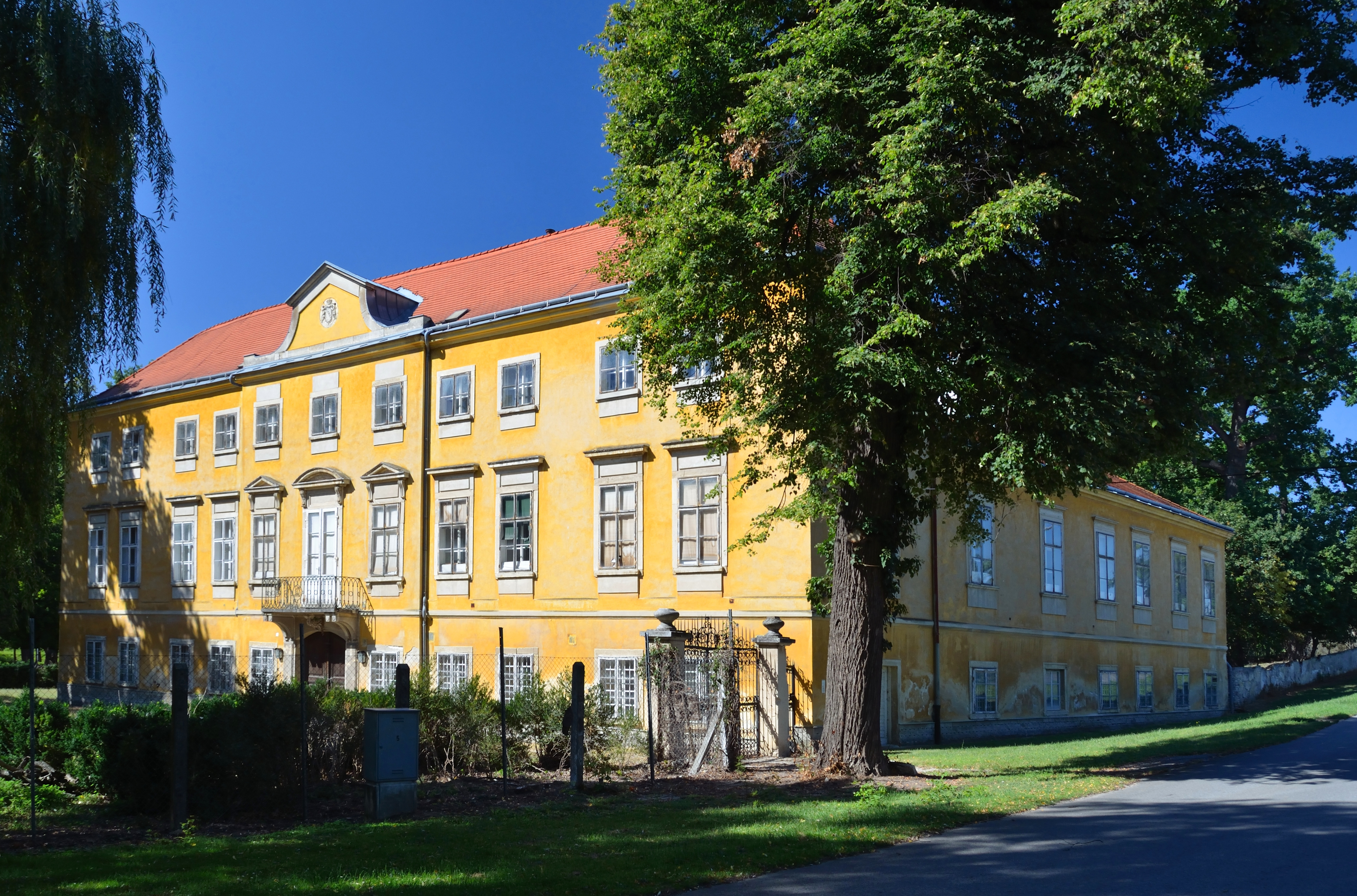
Walterskirchen castle near Poysdorf, Lower Austria, acquired 1733 by Count Andreas Koháry.

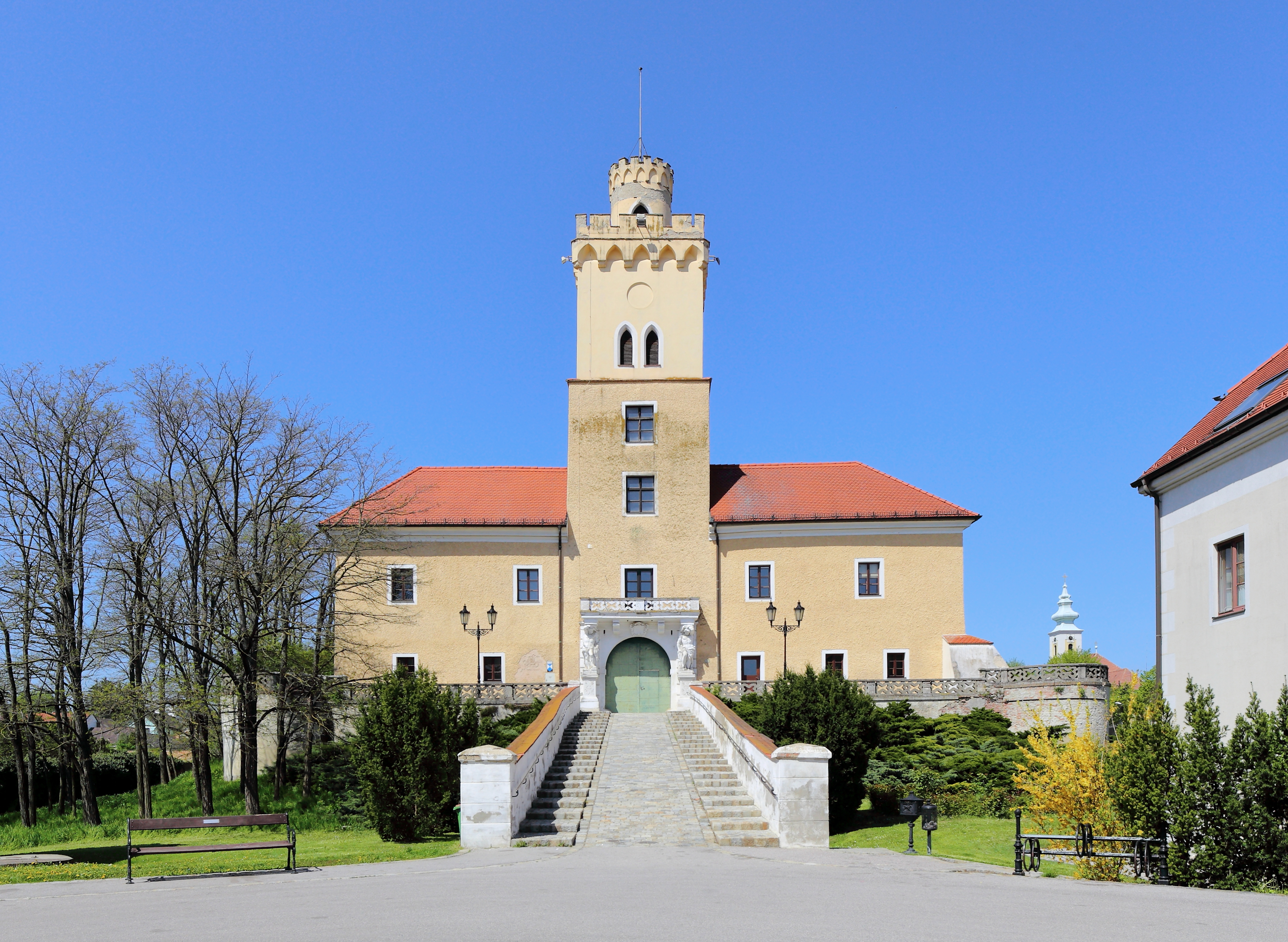
Dürnkrut, Austria, acquired 1779

== See also ==
- List of titled noble families in the Kingdom of Hungary
