= Ferenc József, Prince Koháry of Csábrág and Szitnya =

Hungarian magnate and statesman

Ferenc József, Prince Koháry
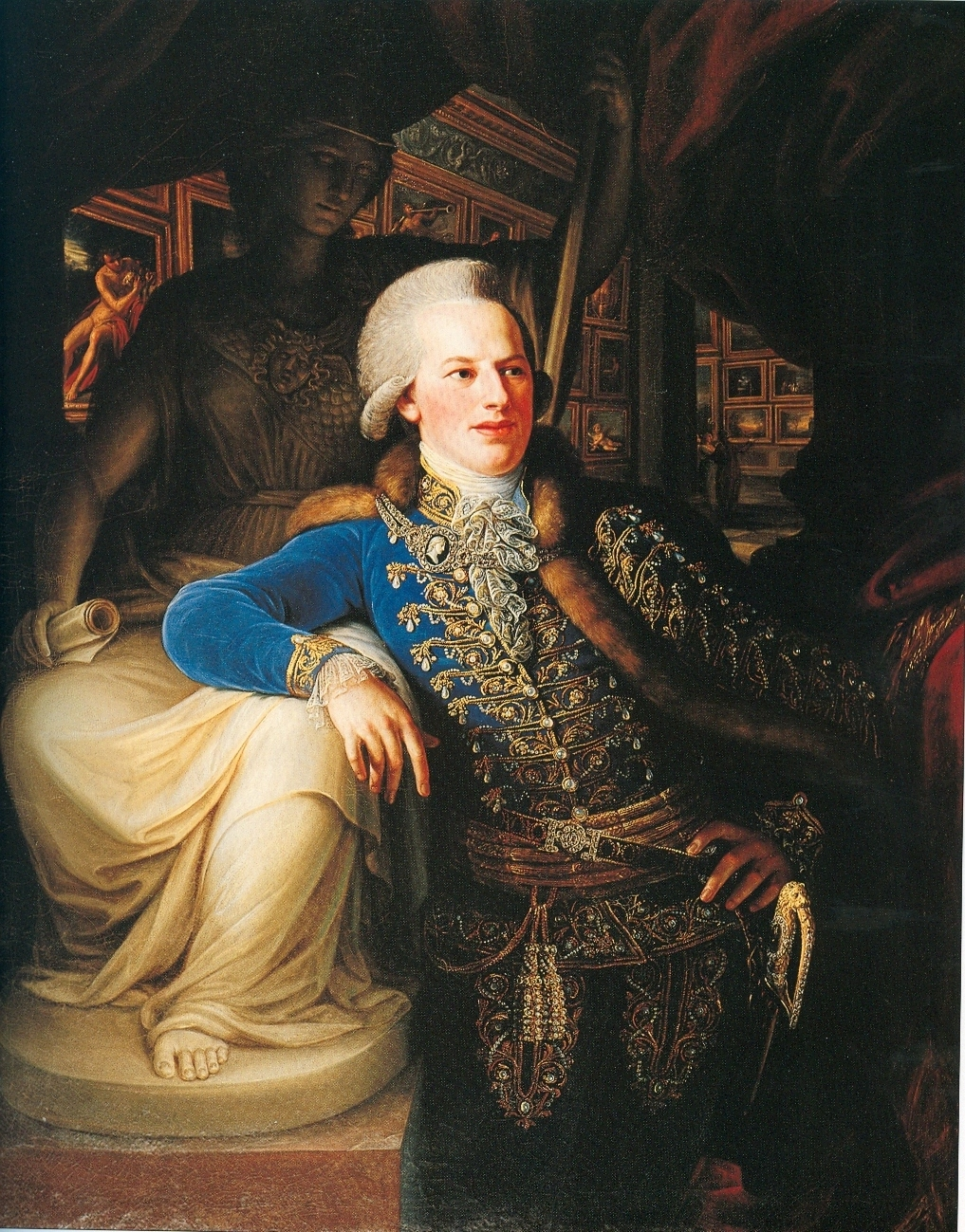
- Portrait by Ignaz Unterberger
- Born: 4 September 1767; Vienna, Archduchy of Austria, Holy Roman Empire
- Died: 27 June 1826 (aged 58); Oroszvár, Kingdom of Hungary
- Buried: Hronský Beňadik
- Noble family: Koháry
- Spouse: Countess Maria Antonia von Waldstein (m. 1792)
- Issue: Ferenc; Princess Maria Antonia Koháry of Csábrág and Szitnya
- Father: Ignác József, Count Koháry de Csábrág et Szitnya
- Mother: Countess Maria Gabriella Cavriani

Ferenc József, 1st Prince Koháry de Csábrág et Szitnya (4 September 1767, in Vienna – 27 June 1826, in Oroszvár), was a Hungarian nobleman, magnate and a statesman. He was a member of the noble House of Koháry and served as Hungarian Chancellor.

== Early life ==
He was the son of Ignác József Anton Franz Xaver, Count Koháry de Csábrág et Szitnya (Szent-Antal, 2 December 1726 – Vienna, 10 October 1777) and his wife, Countess Maria Gabriella Cavriani (Vienna, 25 April 1736 – Pest, 29 July 1803), who were married at Seiffersdorf on 15 January 1758.

On 15 November 1815, Emperor Francis I of Austria awarded him the hereditary title of Fürst von Koháry de Csábrág et Szitnya.

== Marriage and issue ==
On 13 February 1792, he married Countess Maria Antonia von Waldstein-Wartenberg in Vienna. They had two children, a son Ferenc (21 December 1792 – 19 April 1798) and a daughter Maria Antonia (Vienna, 2 July 1797 – Vienna, 25 September 1862).

The latter ultimately became the heiress of his whole fortune of 20 million francs. On 30 November 1815 in Vienna, she married Prince Ferdinand of Saxe-Coburg and Gotha (Coburg, 28 March 1785 – Vienna, 27 August 1851), by whom she had issue, the so-called Princes of Saxe-Coburg and Gotha-Koháry.

== Death ==
Ferenc József, Koháry died in Oroszvár, Kingdom of Hungary, on 27 June 1826 at the age of 58 and was buried in Hronský Beňadik, in present-day Slovakia.

== Ancestry ==
Ancestors of Ferenc József, Prince Koháry of Csábrág and Szitnya

16. István I, Baron Koháry de Csábrág et Szitnya
8. Farkas, Count Koháry de Csábrág et Szitnya
17. Judit de Balassa-Gyarmath
4. András József, Count Koháry de Csábrág et Szitnya
18. Baron Bero von Rechberg-Osterburg
9. Baroness Maria Ludovika von Rechberg-Osterburg
19. Countess Franziska Fugger von Kirchberg und Weißenhorn
2. Ignác József, Count Koháry de Csábrág et Szitnya
20. Jacob Thavonat von Thavon
10. Baron Albert Ludwig Thavonat von Thavon
21. Anna Regina von Berchtold
5. Baroness Margarethe Thavonat von Thavon
22. Emerich Jakusith de Orbova
11. Polixena Josefa Jakusith de Orbova
23. Countess Polyxena Serényi de Kisserény
1. Franz Josef, Prince Koháry de Csabrag et Szitnya
24. Count Franz Karl Cavriani
12. Count Leopold Karl Cavriani
25. Countess Zaezilia Renata von Waldstein-Wartenberg
6. Count Maximilian Guidobaldo Cavriani
26. Baron Georg Julius von Gilleis
13. Baroness Maria Susanna von Gilleis
27. Countess Christina Sabina von Starhemberg
3. Countess Maria Gabriella Cavriani
28. Count Christoph Leopold von Thürheim
14. Count Christoph Wilhelm von Thürheim
29. Anna Judith von Salburg
7. Countess Maria Franziska von Thürheim
30. Count Lobgott von Kuefstein
15. Countess Maria Franziska von Kuefstein
31. Countess Maria Anna von Starhemberg

== Sources ==
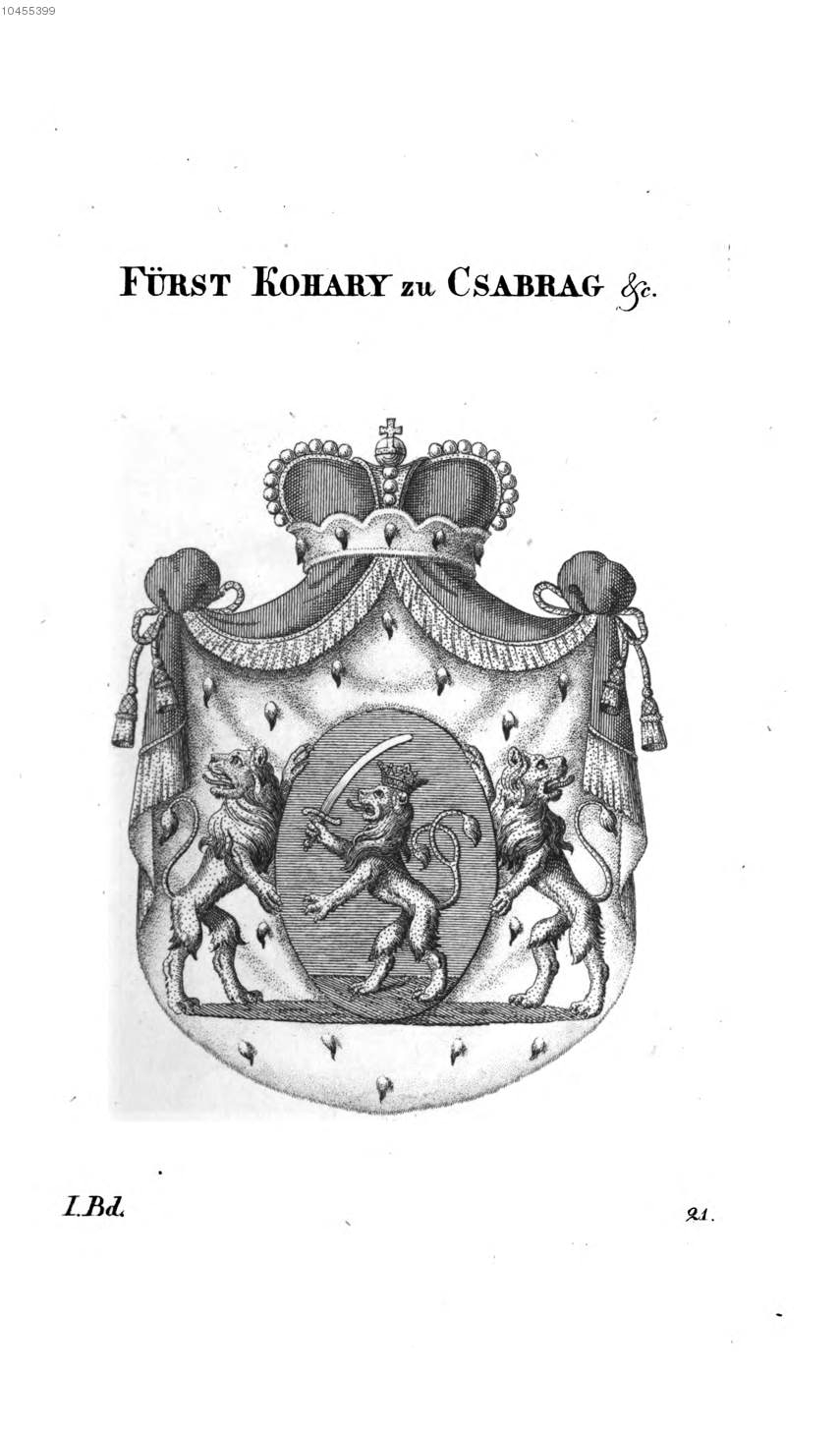
Princely arms

- Franz Karl Wißgrill: Schauplatz des landsässigen Nieder-Österreichischen Adels vom Herren- und Ritterstande, Band 5, Seite 177ff.
- Constantin von Wurzbach: Biographisches Lexikon des Kaiserthums Oesterreich, Band 12, Seite 284
