= Čabradský Vrbovok =

Čabradský Vrbovok Csábrágvarbók
- Municipality
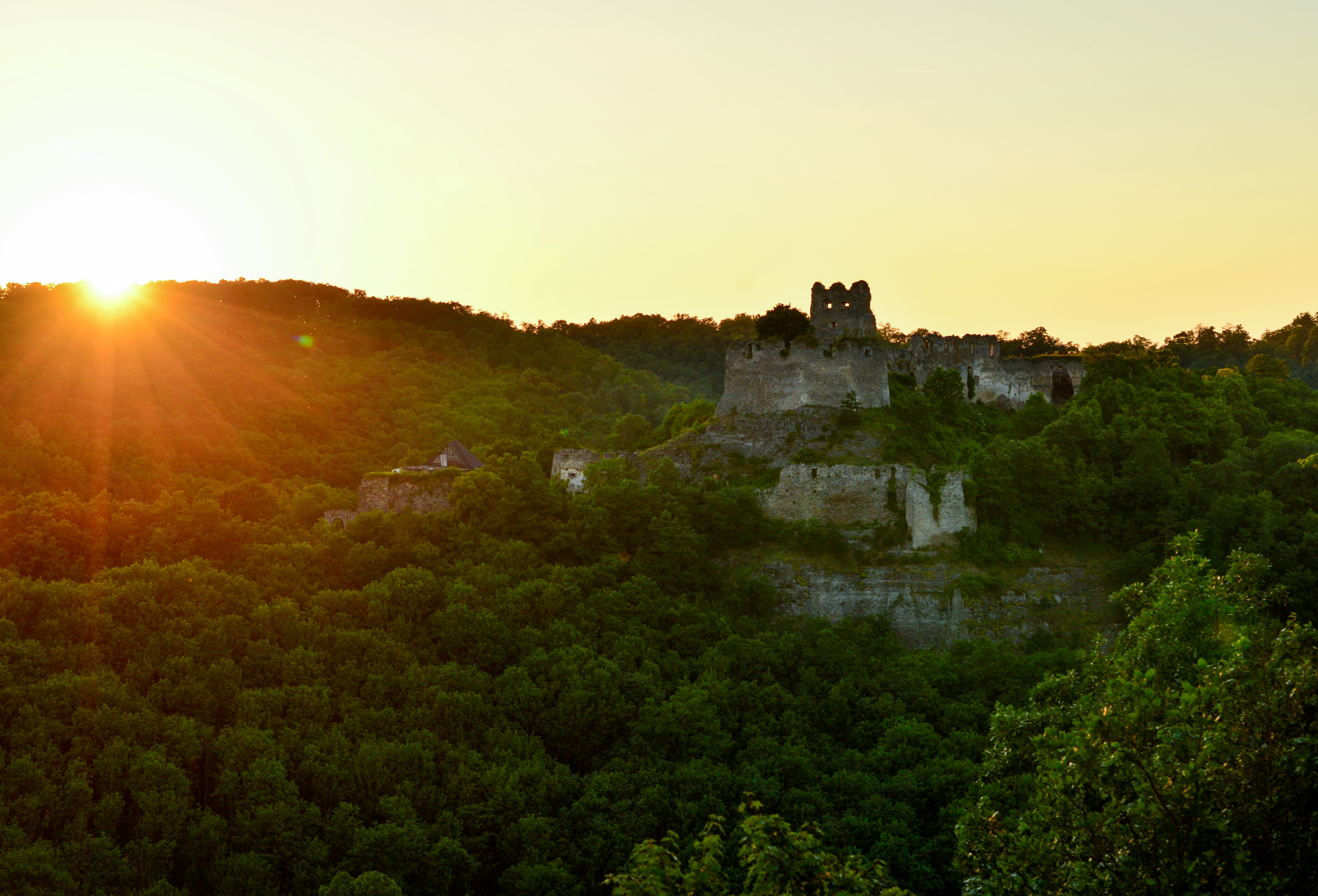
- Čabraď castle at sunset

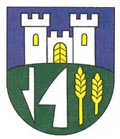
- Flag Coat of arms

- Location of Čabradský Vrbovok in the Banská Bystrica Region Location of Čabradský Vrbovok in Slovakia
- Coordinates: 48.26°N 19.07°E
- Country: Slovakia
- Region: Banská Bystrica Region
- District: Krupina District
- First mentioned: 1135

Government
  - Mayor: Ján Sliacky

Area
  - Total: 23.31 km^{2} (9.00 sq mi)
- Elevation: 314 m (1,030 ft)

Population (2025)
  - Total: 223
- Time zone: UTC+1 (CET)
  - Summer (DST): UTC+2 (CEST)
- Postal code: 962 51
- Area code: +421 45
- Vehicle registration plate (until 2022): KA
- Website: www.cabradskyvrbovok.dcom.sk

Čabradský Vrbovok (Hungarian: Csábrágvarbók) is a village and municipality in the Krupina District of the Banská Bystrica Region of Slovakia.

The village is best known for the ruins of Čabraď Castle.

== Geography ==
The municipality lies at an altitude of 314 metres (1,030 ft) and covers an area of 23.31 km^{2} (9.00 sq mi) (2025).

== History ==
The village was first mentioned in 1135 as Werbouch(later as 1262 Werbouk Inferior, 1285 Warabuk, 1342 Werbok). In 1256 King Bela IV moved colonists from Hontianske Nemce to the location of Čabradský Vrbovok. The village belonged to the Čabraď Castle and the Hunt family. In the 15th century the village became a royal property and in 1513 it belonged to the feudatory Tamas Bakóczy. Also in the 15th century it was besieged by the Bohemian Jan Jiskra. Later on it belonged to the Erdődy and Pálffy families. Between 1547 and 1549 it passed to the noble man Melichar Balassa, in 1584 to the local family Illésházy and in 1622 to the yeoman Koháry. In 1817 it belonged to the Coburg family.

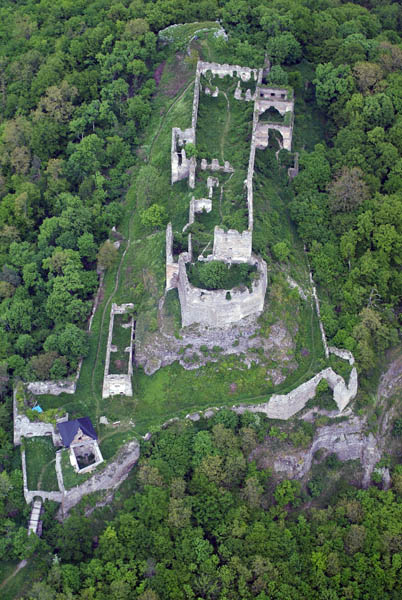

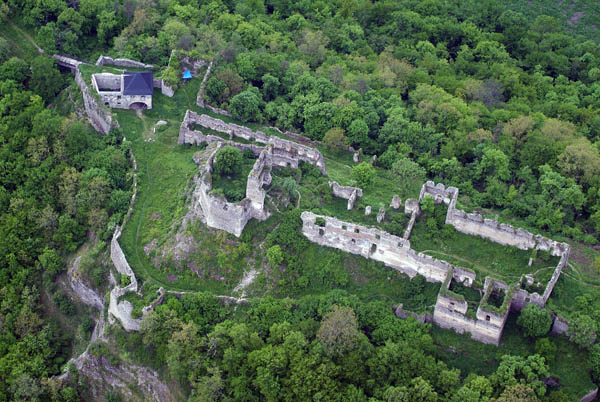

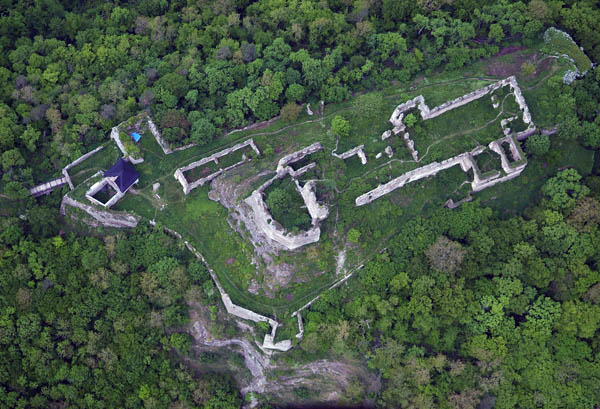

== Genealogical resources ==
The records for genealogical research are available at the state archive "Statny Archiv in Banska Bystrica, Presov, Slovakia"

- Roman Catholic church records (births/marriages/deaths): 1749-1895 (parish A)
- Lutheran church records (births/marriages/deaths): 1728-1896 (parish B)

== Population ==
Population statistic (10 years)
Year	1995	2005	2015	2025
Count	291	275	254	223
Difference		−5.49%	−7.63%	−12.20%

Population statistic
Year	2024	2025
Count	230	223
Difference		−3.04%

It has a population of 223 people (31 December 2025).

=== Ethnicity ===
Census 2021 (1+ %)
Ethnicity	Number	Fraction
Slovak	228	97.02%
Total	235	

In year 2021 was 235 people by ethnicity 228 as Slovak, 2 as Czech, 2 as Romani, 2 as Not found out, 1 as Italian and 1 as English.

Note on population: The difference values of population numbers in the table "Population statistic" and in the sections "Ethnicity" & "Religion" is caused by the use of various statistical methods.

=== Religion ===
Census 2021 (1+ %)
Religion	Number	Fraction
Roman Catholic Church	158	67.23%
Evangelical Church	47	20%
None	22	9.36%
Greek Catholic Church	5	2.13%
Total	235	

In year 2021 was 235 people by religion 158 from Roman Catholic Church, 47 from Evangelical Church, 22 from None, 5 from Greek Catholic Church, 2 from Not found out and 1 from Paganism and natural spirituality.

== See also ==
- List of municipalities and towns in Slovakia
