= Čabraď Castle =

Castle ruin in Slovakia

- Čabradský Vrbovok, Slovakia
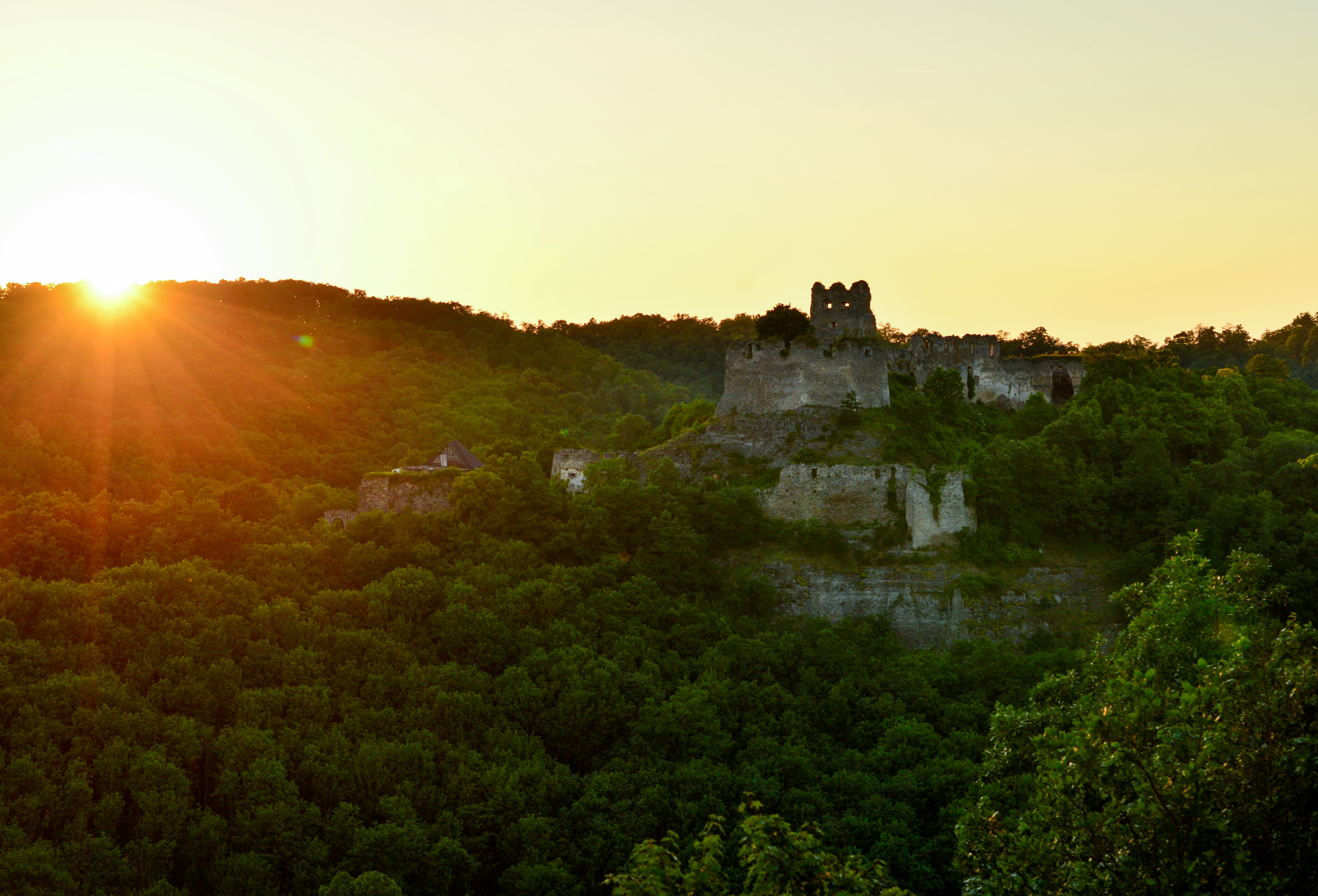
- Čabraď Castle at sunset.

Site information
- Condition: Ruined

Location
- Location in Slovakia
- Coordinates: 48.243889°N 19.106111°E

Site history
- Built: before 1276
- Demolished: 1812

Čabraď Castle (Slovak: Čabradský hrad, Hungarian: Csábrág) is a castle ruin in Slovakia near the village of Čabradský Vrbovok, in the southeast of Krupina. It is surrounded by the Čabraď nature reserve.

== Origins ==
First mentioned in 1276, Litava Castle, as it was called then, due to its position on top of the Litava Valley and its river, possesses a dominating position. It along with other (sentry) castles were built to protect the roads that traveled the area to the northern Hungarian mines (now in central Slovakia) that were booming at the time. The castle was the residence of the Ders of Hunt-Poznan who are noted as being in the area from 1256.

This originally sentry castle first mentioned in 1276 was built to guard the road leading to many northern Hungarian mining towns. In the 16th century it was rebuilt to the counter-Turk fort, which successfully resisted all Turkish raids. The Koháry family acquired the castle in the 17th century. They later moved into the more comfortable manor house in Svätý Anton and had the castle burned in 1812. The castle has been decaying ever since.

In the 14th century the castle is recorded as becoming the residence of Mathias Csák, around 1342 the castle began to be expanded into a more suitable fortification than in previous times. Some time later Cabrad was conquered and taken over by Jan Jiskra of Brandys, who was marching with his Hussite forces. Hungarian King Matthias Corvinus came and re-claimed the castle in 1462.

== House of Lords and Bandits ==
In the early part of the 16th century Cardinal Tamás Bakócz took over the castle and invested in its refurbishment and further expansions. He was one of the richest men in Hungary and the country's highest clerical official at that time. All the work took place around 1520. Peter Bakoc his nephew, inherited the castle after his uncle's passing—along with his wealth, after Bakoc, his sister and brother-in-law took over the residence. In 1547 the castle was taken seized by the knight Melichar Balassa and his bandit retinue, until the king forced him out a year later in 1548.

== Italian Engineering ==
In 1585, fears of Ottoman advances were rising in the country and vast fortification works were initiated, led by the Italian fortress architect G. Ferrari. This is possibly why the Ottoman army failed in both its attempts during the years 1585 and 1602.

After these events the castle became part of the King's fiefdom, which he rewarded in 1622 to noble Peter Kohary, for his outstanding actions and efforts in fighting the Ottomans. The 17th century was a relatively peaceful time for Cabrad Castle, going through the anti-Habsburg rebellions without much event or issue. But also around this time the road which was the castle's reasoning began to lose its importance.

== Set to blaze ==
In 1750 the Koháry family gave up on the Čabraď castle as their residence. The family kept it for a time as just a summer home until Ferencz József Koháry de Csábrág put the castle to blaze in 1812. Since then it has remained the ruin that it is today, slowly being reclaimed by the surrounding forests.

== Gallery ==
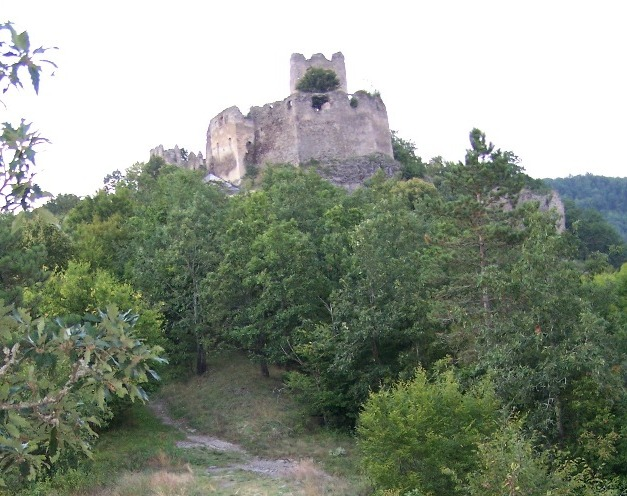
Čabraď Castle, front view

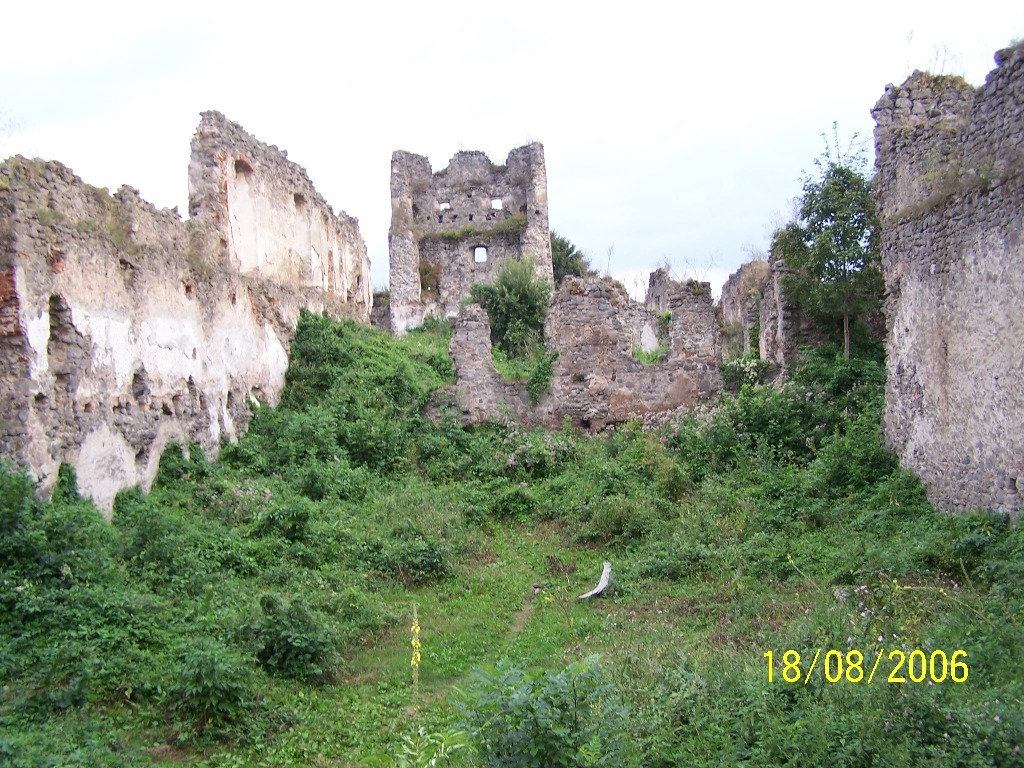
Čabraď Castle

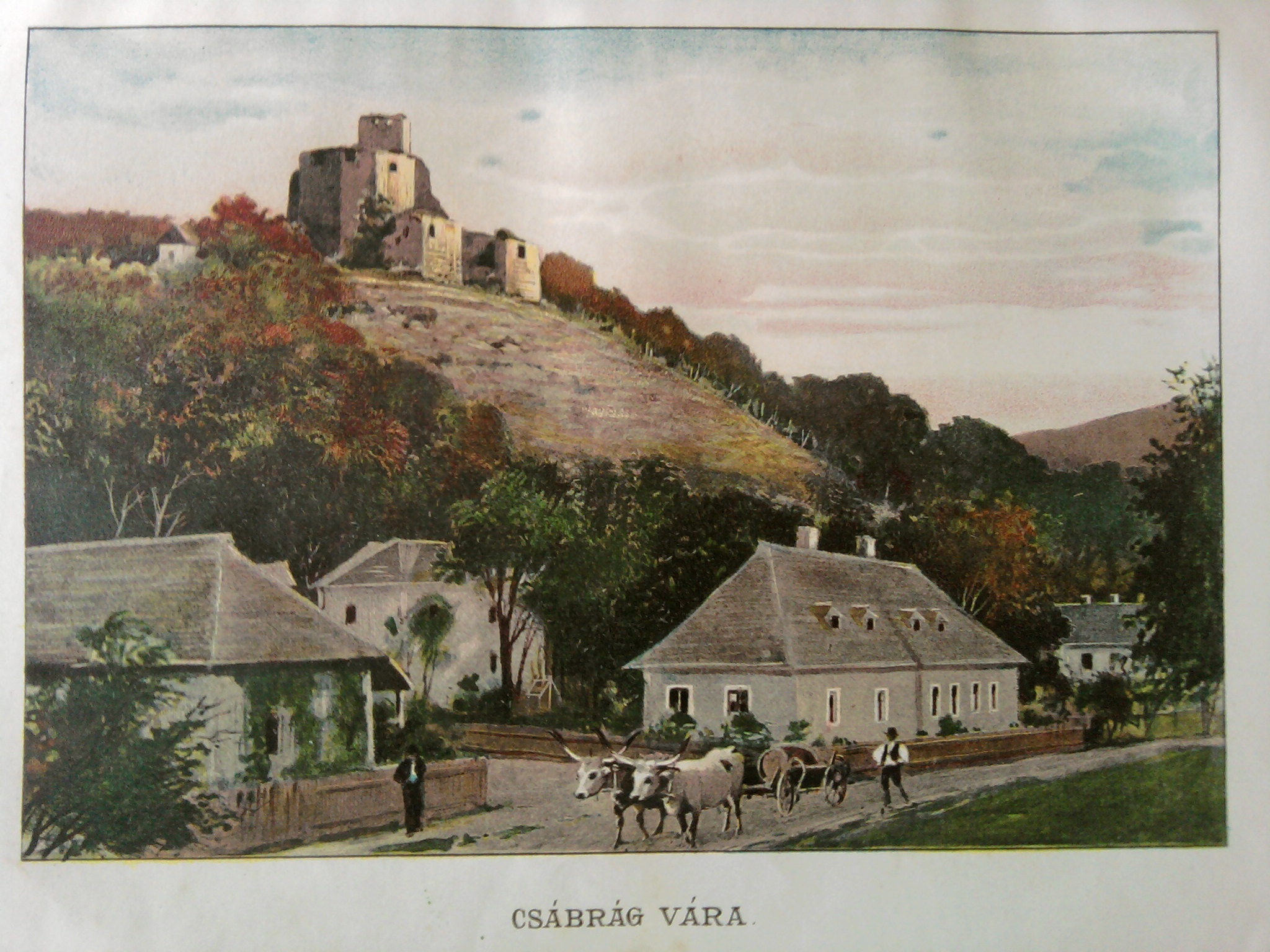
Artist's rendition from 1906
