= Hronský Beňadik =

Hronský Beňadik Garamszentbenedek
- Municipality
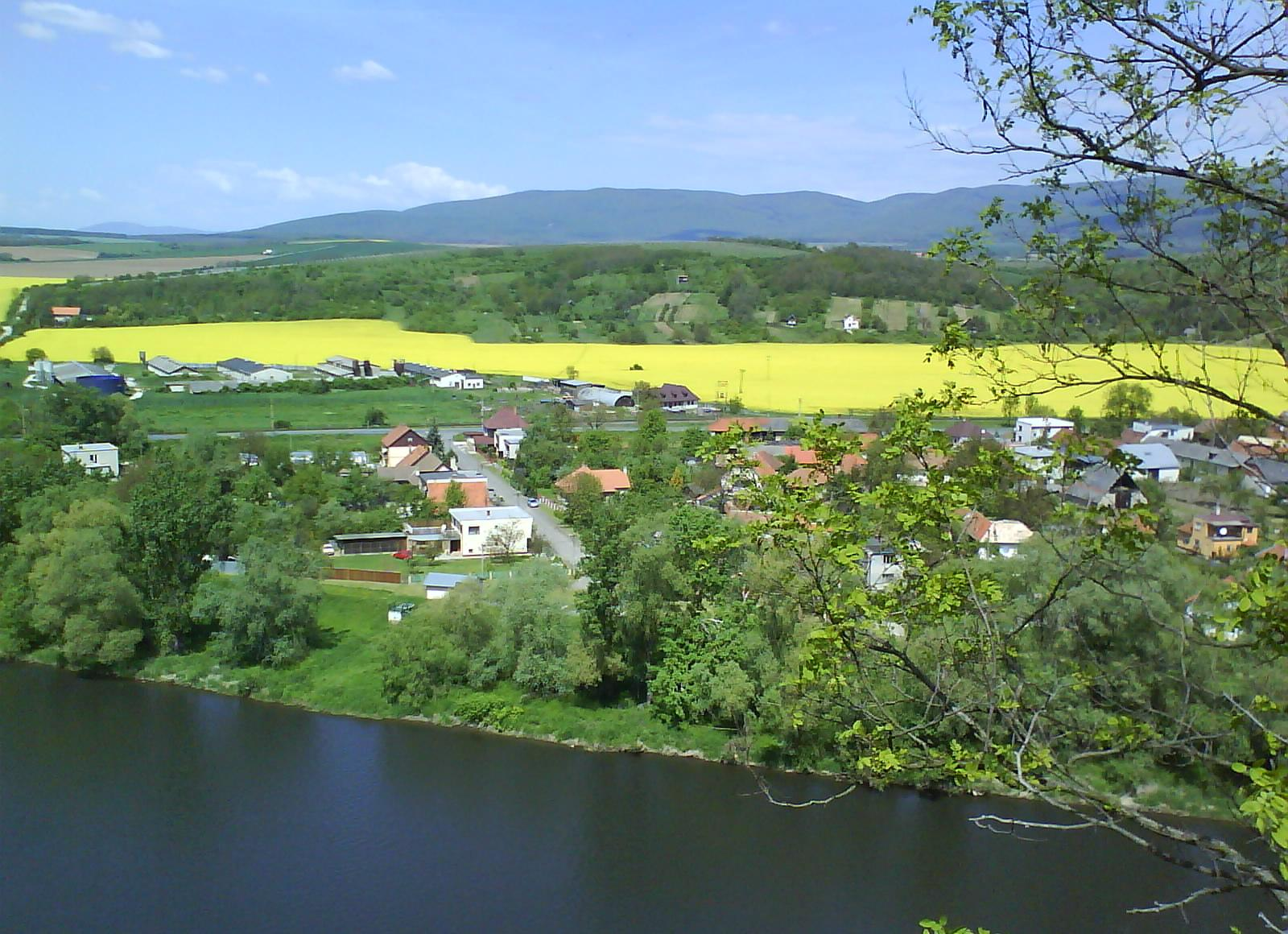

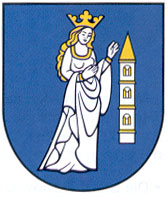
- Flag Coat of arms

- Location of Hronský Beňadik in the Banská Bystrica Region Location of Hronský Beňadik in Slovakia
- Coordinates: 48.34°N 18.56°E
- Country: Slovakia
- Region: Banská Bystrica Region
- District: Žarnovica District
- First mentioned: 1075

Area
  - Total: 9.22 km^{2} (3.56 sq mi)
- Elevation: 180 m (590 ft)

Population (2025)
  - Total: 1,055
- Time zone: UTC+1 (CET)
  - Summer (DST): UTC+2 (CEST)
- Postal code: 966 53
- Area code: +421 45
- Vehicle registration plate (until 2022): ZC
- Website: www.hronskybenadik.sk

Hronský Beňadik (1920–1948: Svätý Benedik, 1948–1960: Svätý Beňadik; German: Sankt Benedikt; Hungarian: Garamszentbenedek, until 1888: Szentbenedek; Latin: Sanctus Benedictus) is a village in central Slovakia. It has a population of 1233 (2005).

According to the local tourist information officer, this is the site referred to in what may be the first written mention of present-day Slovak territory.

This version of events states that in 172 AD Roman Emperor Marcus Aurelius had fought a victorious battle in Hronský Beňadik when it started 'raining fire'. The panic this created in his forces led some of the closet Christians among them to start praying, after which the deluge abated and Marcus Aurelius cut short his campaign. The incident was later recorded in the emperor's own memoirs.

== Geography ==
The municipality lies at an altitude of 180 metres (590 ft) and covers an area of 9.22 km^{2} (3.56 sq mi) (2025).

It is situated in the Hron valley between the mountains Pohronský Inovec and Štiavnické vrchy, located around 40 km east of Nitra and 120 km north-east of Bratislava.

== History ==
The territory of the village has been settled since the Neolithic and Hallstatt period, but it is best known for a very important Benedictine abbey, which played in important role in the Christianization process and in the development of culture and education. It was founded in 1075 by King Géza I under the name "Monasterium Ecclesia Sancti Benedicti". The Nitra Gospels, the oldest Latin book (i.e. not just text) from the territory of Slovakia, were written here around 1100. The abbey ceased operations during the 16th century in the course of the Ottoman expansion in present-day Hungary. The church of the monastery contains valuable works of art (a wood-carving of the Holy Sepulchre, a wall-painting presenting the legend of St. George, an altar depicting the Passion, a sculpture of Jesus Christ from the 13th century, a Madonna sculpture from the 14th century, etc.). The abbey was declared a National Cultural Monument in 1945.

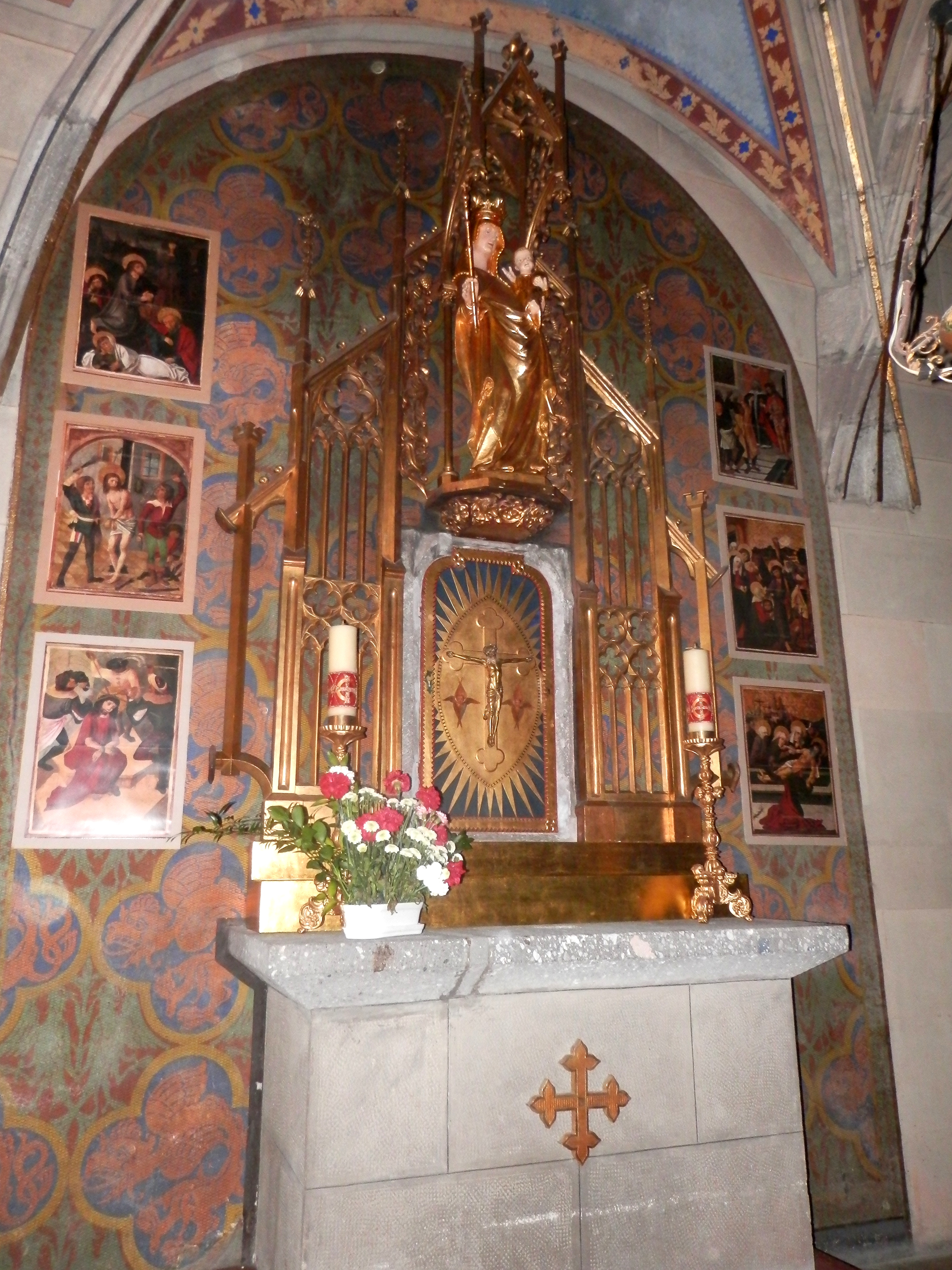
Chapel of the Holy Blood

The village below the abbey arose in the 14th century and received a city charter (town privileges) in 1347, but was destroyed by the Turks (Ottomans) in 1599 and later re-built.

== Population ==
Population statistic (10 years)
Year	1995	2005	2015	2025
Count	1182	1233	1183	1055
Difference		+4.31%	−4.05%	−10.81%

Population statistic
Year	2024	2025
Count	1071	1055
Difference		−1.49%

It has a population of 1055 people (31 December 2025).

=== Ethnicity ===
Census 2021 (1+ %)
Ethnicity	Number	Fraction
Slovak	1096	97.68%
Romani	41	3.65%
Not found out	22	1.96%
Total	1122	

In year 2021 was 1122 people by ethnicity 1096 as Slovak, 41 as Romani, 22 as Not found out, 7 as Czech, 7 as Romanian, 3 as Other, 2 as Polish, 2 as Hungarian, 2 as Canadian, 2 as English, 1 as Ukrainian, 1 as Italian and 1 as Russian.

Note on population: The difference values of population numbers in the table "Population statistic" and in the sections "Ethnicity" & "Religion" is caused by the use of various statistical methods.

=== Religion ===
Census 2021 (1+ %)
Religion	Number	Fraction
Roman Catholic Church	861	76.74%
None	199	17.74%
Not found out	23	2.05%
Total	1122	

In year 2021 was 1122 people by religion 861 from Roman Catholic Church, 199 from None, 23 from Not found out, 10 from Evangelical Church, 9 from Christian Congregations in Slovakia, 8 from Greek Catholic Church, 4 from Eastern Orthodox Church, 4 from Jehovah's Witnesses, 1 from Old Catholic Church, 1 from Calvinist Church, 1 from Other and 1 from Ad hoc movements.

According to the 2001 census, the village had 1,220 inhabitants. 98.44% of inhabitants were Slovaks, 0.41% Roma, 0.33% Hungarians and 0.25% Czechs. The religious make-up was 91.89% Roman Catholics, 3.28% people with no religious affiliation and 0.90% Lutherans.

== Notable people ==
Both members of the Slovak pop duo TWiiNS were born on 15 May 1986 in Hronský Beňadik.
