= Infante Augusto, Duke of Coimbra =

Portuguese infante (1847–1889)

Infante Augusto
- Duke of Coimbra
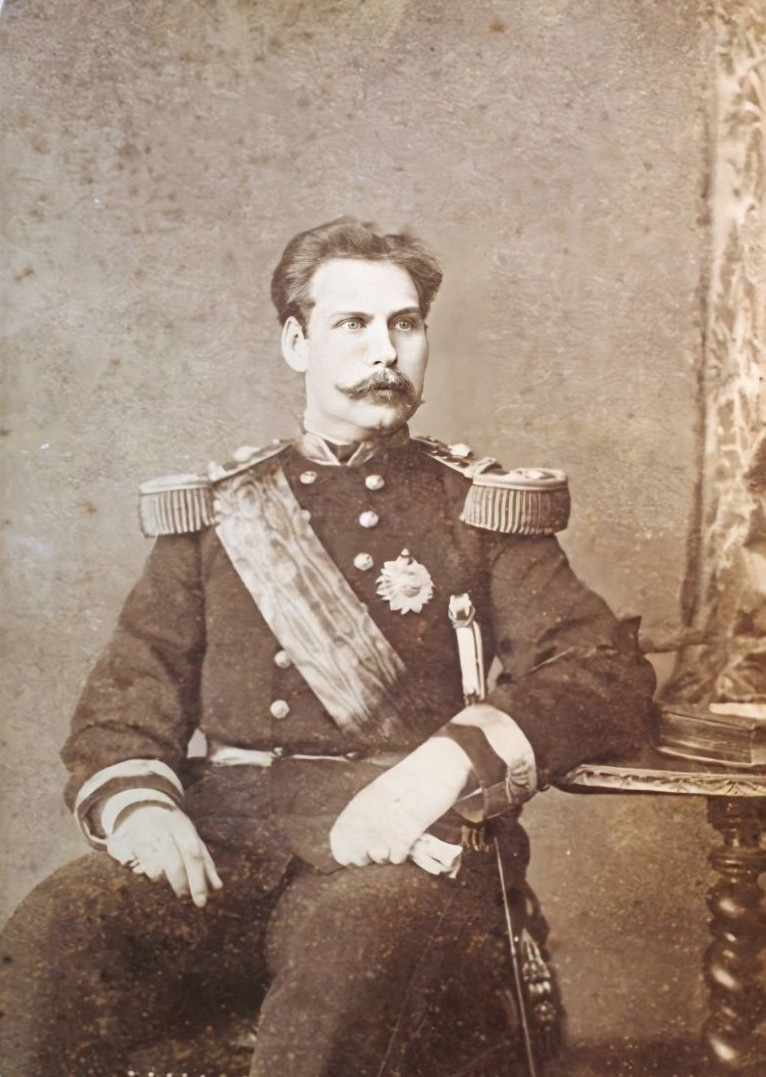
- Infante Augusto, c. 1860s-70s
- Born: 4 November 1847; Necessidades Palace, Lisbon, Portugal
- Died: 26 September 1889 (aged 41); Lisbon, Portugal
- Burial: Royal Pantheon of the Braganza Dynasty
Names
- Augusto Maria Miguel Gabriel Rafael Agrícola Francisco de Assis Gonzaga Pedro de Alcântara Loiola
- House: House of Braganza
- Father: Ferdinand II of Portugal
- Mother: Maria II of Portugal

Infante Augusto, Duke of Coimbra (Portuguese pronunciation: [awˈɡuʃtu]; English: Augustus; 4 November 1847 – 26 September 1889) was a Portuguese infante (prince) of the House of Braganza.

== Life ==
Augusto Maria Miguel Gabriel Rafael Agrícola Francisco de Assis Gonzaga Pedro de Alcântara Loiola of Saxe-Coburg-Gotha and Bragança was born in Lisbon as the fifth son of Queen Maria II of Portugal and her husband and co-ruler, King Fernando II. Augusto was created Duke of Coimbra and had the additional title Duke of Saxony through his father. He had the style of His Royal Highness.

In late 1861, three of his brothers the king Pedro V, Infante João, Duke of Beja and Infante Fernando all fell ill and died. Despite falling ill himself he survived and became heir presumptive to another of his brothers and the new king, Luis I on 27 December 1861 following the death of his brother João. He remained heir until 28 September 1863 and the birth of Prince Carlos, son of king Luis.

Augusto had a career in the Portuguese Army and became general of a division. He died in Lisbon 1889. He is buried at the Royal Pantheon of the Braganza Dynasty.

== Ancestry ==
Ancestors of Infante Augusto, Duke of Coimbra

8. Francis, Duke of Saxe-Coburg-Saalfeld
4. Prince Ferdinand of Saxe-Coburg and Gotha
9. Countess Augusta Reuss of Ebersdorf
2. Fernando II of Portugal
10. Ferenc József, Prince Koháry de Csábrág et Szitnya
5. Princess Mária Antónia Koháry de Csábrág et Szitnya
11. Countess Maria Antonia von Waldstein zu Wartenberg
1. Infante Augusto, Duke of Coimbra
12. João VI of Portugal
6. Pedro I of Brazil and IV of Portugal
13. Infanta Carlota Joaquina of Spain
3. Maria II of Portugal
14. Francis II, Holy Roman Emperor
7. Archduchess Leopoldina of Austria
15. Princess Maria Theresa of Naples and Sicily
