= Ferdinand of Portugal =

Ferdinand of Portugal may refer to:

== Kings ==
- Ferdinand I of Portugal (1345–1383)
- Ferdinand II of Portugal (1819–1885), King Consort to Mary II of Portugal

== Infantes ==
- Infante Fernando, Count of Flanders (1188–1233), son of Sancho I of Portugal
- Infante Fernando, Lord of Serpa (a. 1217–c. 1243), son of Afonso II of Portugal
- Infante Fernando of Portugal (1260) (1260–1262), son of Afonso III of Portugal
- Ferdinand of Portugal, Lord of Eça (c. 1378–?), son of Infante John, Duke of Valencia de Campos
- Fernando, the Saint Prince, Infante Fernando of Portugal, (1402–1443), son of John I of Portugal
- Ferdinand, Duke of Viseu (1433–1470), son of Edward of Portugal
- Infante Fernando, Duke of Guarda and Trancoso (1507–1534), son of Manuel I of Portugal
- Infante Fernando Maria Luís of Portugal (1846–1861), son of Maria II of Portugal and Ferdinand II of Portugal
