= Infante João, Duke of Beja =

Portuguese infante (1842–1861)

Infante João
- Duke of Beja
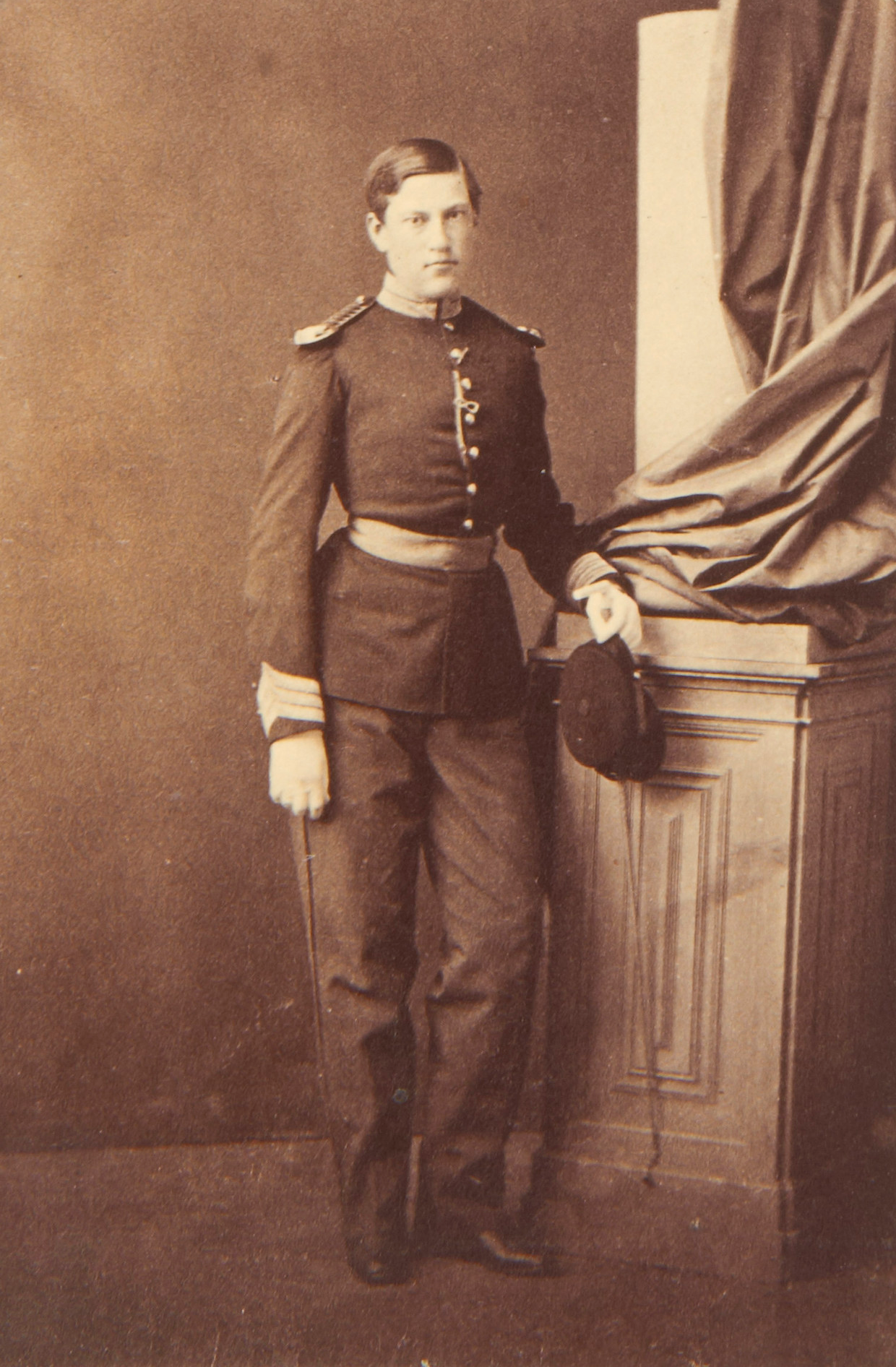
- João in 1861
- Born: 16 March 1842; Necessidades Palace, Lisbon, Portugal
- Died: 27 December 1861 (aged 19); Necessidades Palace, Lisbon, Portugal
- Burial: Royal Pantheon of the Braganza Dynasty
Names
- João Maria Fernando Pedro de Alcântara Miguel Rafael Gabriel Leopoldo Carlos António Gregório Francisco de Assis Borja Gonzaga Félix
- House: Braganza
- Father: Ferdinand of Saxe-Coburg and Gotha
- Mother: Maria II of Portugal

Infante João, Duke of Beja (Portuguese pronunciation: [ʒuˈɐ̃w]; English: John; 16 March 1842 – 27 December 1861) was a Portuguese infante (prince) and member of the House of Braganza.

== Early life ==
Infante João was born in Lisbon the third son of Queen Maria II of Portugal and King Fernando II. He was created Duke of Beja and held the additional title of Prince of Saxe-Coburg and Gotha, Duke in Saxony as a dynast of the House of Saxe-Coburg and Gotha.

== Military ==
João received a military education and was a colonel of a cavalry regiment. He was visiting England and France with his brother the Duke of Porto, heir presumptive to the throne, when they were summoned to return to Portugal by their brother King Pedro V who was dying of typhoid fever or cholera. Their brother died on 11 November 1861 before they could return along with their fifteen-year-old brother Fernando. With his death the Duke of Porto became King Luís I and João became heir presumptive to the throne.

He did not remain heir for long as he died a month later of the same illness that killed his brothers in Lisbon on 27 December 1861 aged 19 and unmarried.

== Ancestry ==
Ancestors of Infante João, Duke of Beja

8. Francis, Duke of Saxe-Coburg-Saalfeld
4. Prince Ferdinand of Saxe-Coburg and Gotha
9. Countess Augusta Reuss of Ebersdorf
2. Fernando II of Portugal
10. Ferenc József, Prince Koháry de Csábrág et Szitnya
5. Princess Mária Antónia Koháry de Csábrág et Szitnya
11. Countess Maria Antonia von Waldstein zu Wartenberg
1. Infante João, Duke of Beja
12. João VI of Portugal
6. Pedro I of Brazil and IV of Portugal
13. Infanta Carlota Joaquina of Spain
3. Maria II of Portugal
14. Francis II, Holy Roman Emperor
7. Archduchess Leopoldina of Austria
15. Princess Maria Theresa of Naples and Sicily
