= Pedro V of Portugal =

King of Portugal from 1853 to 1861

Pedro V
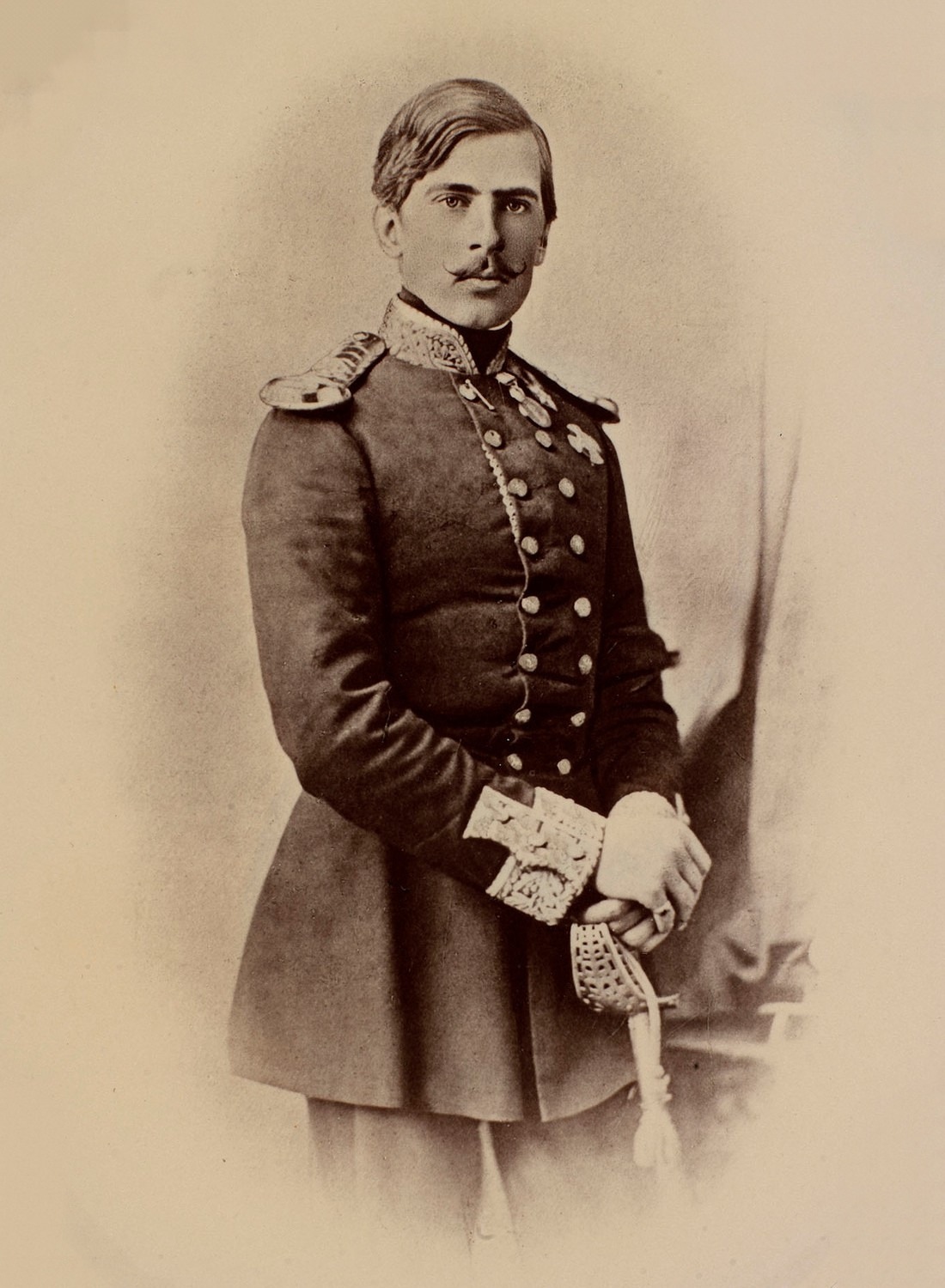
- Portrait, 1861

King of Portugal
- Reign: 15 November 1853 – 11 November 1861
- Acclamation: 16 September 1855
- Predecessor: Maria II and Ferdinand II
- Successor: Luís I
- Regent: Ferdinand II (1853–1855)
- Prime Ministers: See list: The Duke of Saldanha The Duke of Loulé The Duke of Terceira Joaquim António de Aguiar
- Born: 16 September 1837; Necessidades Palace, Lisbon
- Died: 11 November 1861 (aged 24); Necessidades Palace, Lisbon
- Burial: Pantheon of the Braganzas
- Spouse: Stephanie of Hohenzollern-Sigmaringen (m. 1858; died 1859)
- House: Braganza (Note: "While remaining patrilineal dynasts of the duchy of Saxe-Coburg and Gotha according to pp. 88, 116 of the 1944 Almanach de Gotha, Title 1, Chapter 1, Article 5 of the 1838 Portuguese constitution declared, with respect to Ferdinand II of Portugal's issue by his first wife, that 'the Most Serene House of Braganza is the reigning house of Portugal and continues through the Person of the Lady Queen Maria II'. Thus their mutual descendants constitute the Coburg line of the House of Braganza".)
- Father: Ferdinand II of Portugal
- Mother: Maria II of Portugal
- Religion: Roman Catholicism
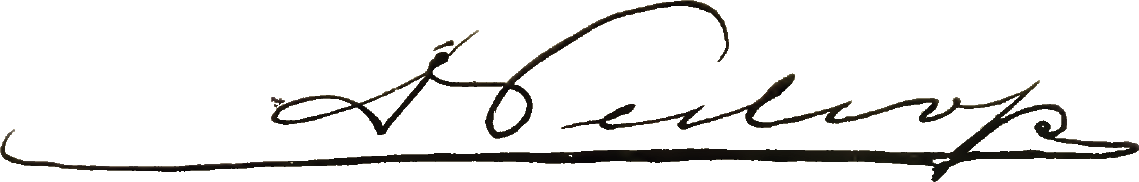
- Signature

Dom Pedro V (Anglicized: Peter V, Portuguese: Pedro de Alcântara Maria Fernando Miguel Rafael Gonzaga Xavier João António Leopoldo Vítor Francisco de Assis Júlio Amélio; 16 September 1837 – 11 November 1861), nicknamed "the Hopeful" (Portuguese: o Esperançoso), was King of Portugal from 1853 until his death in 1861.

== Early life and reign ==
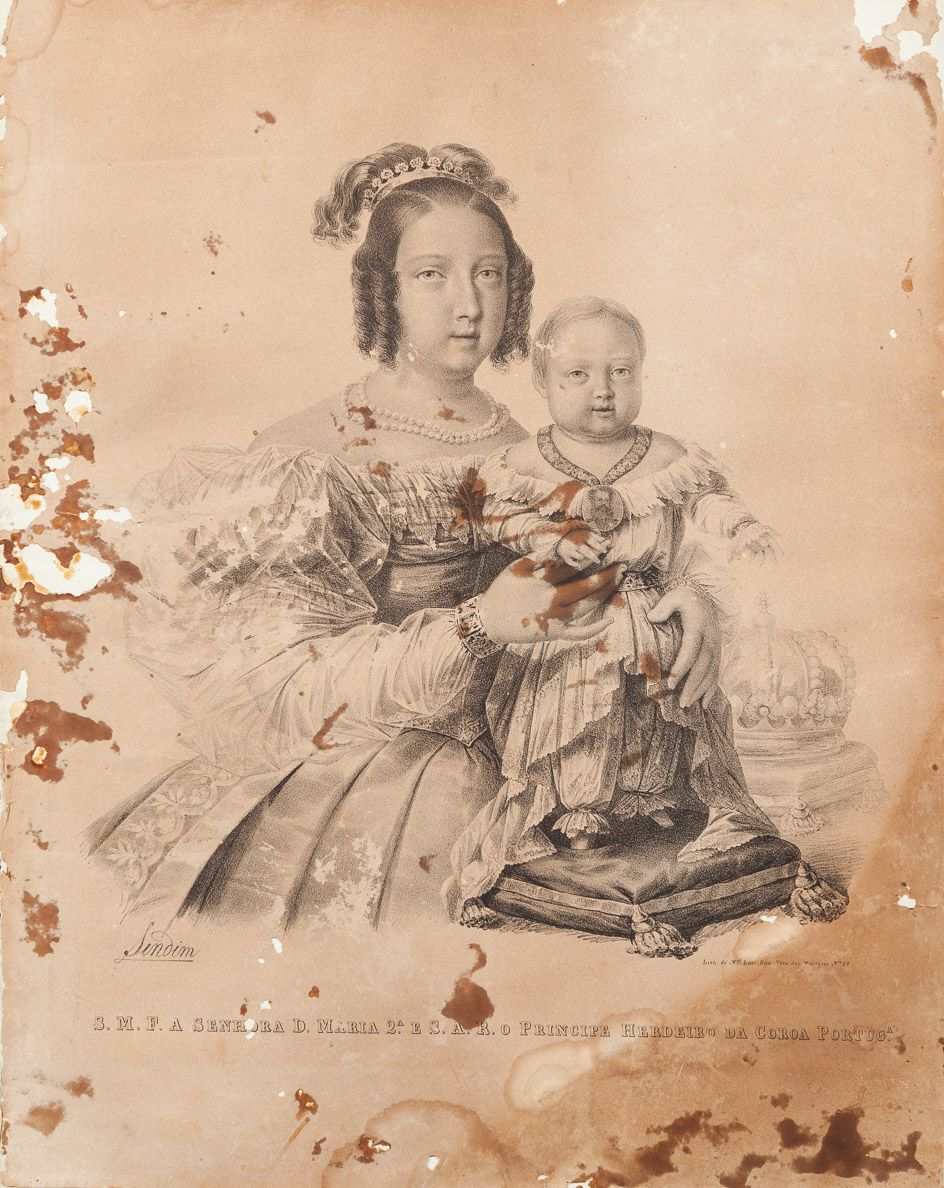
Pedro as an infant with his mother, Queen Maria II, c. 1840.

As the eldest son of Queen Maria II and King Ferdinand II, Peter was a member of the House of Bragança. (Note: While remaining patrilineal dynasts of the duchy of Saxe-Coburg and Gotha according to pp. 88, 116 of the 1944 Almanach de Gotha, Title 1, Chapter 1, Article 5 of the 1838 Portuguese constitution declared, with respect to Ferdinand II of Portugal's issue by his first wife, that 'the Most Serene House of Braganza is the reigning house of Portugal and continues through the Person of the Lady Queen Maria II'. Thus their mutual descendants constitute the Coburg line of the House of Braganza") As heir apparent to the throne he was styled Prince Royal (Portuguese: Príncipe Real), and was also the 23rd Duke of Braganza (Duque de Bragança).

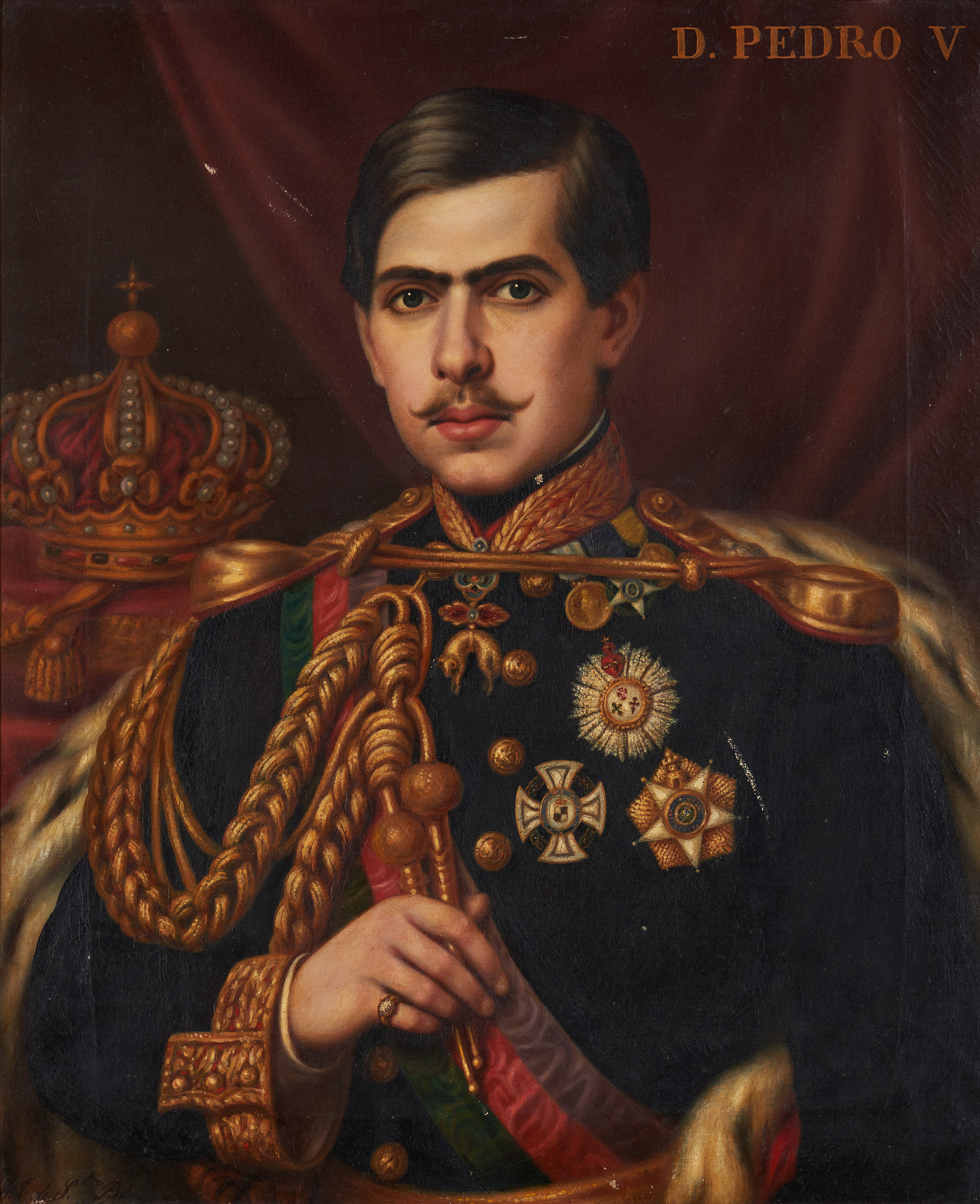
Portrait painting of Pedro V of Portugal by António Joaquim de Santa Bárbara.

Peter was a conscientious and hard-working monarch who, under the guidance of his father, sought radical modernisation of the Portuguese state and infrastructure. Under his reign, roads, telegraphs, and railways were constructed and improvements in public health advanced. His popularity increased when, during the cholera outbreak of 1853–1856, he visited hospitals handing out gifts and comforting the sick.

Pedro V, along with his brothers Fernando and João and other royal family members, died of typhoid fever or cholera in 1861.

Pedro V founded Associação Naval de Lisboa on 30 April 1856, the oldest sports club in Portugal.

== Marriage ==
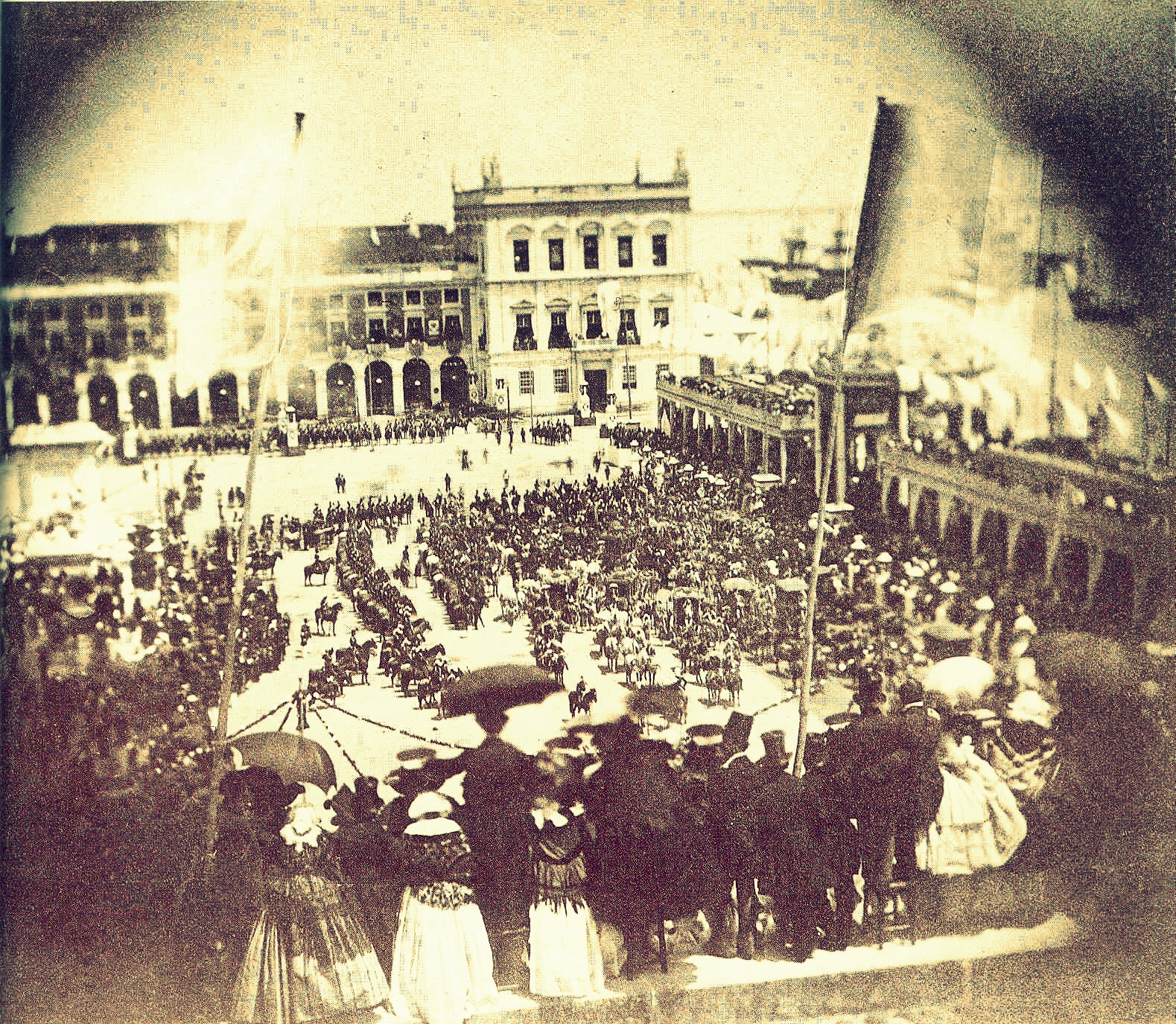
Arrival of Queen Stephanie at Terreiro do Paço, 1858

Peter married German Princess Stephanie of Hohenzollern-Sigmaringen, eldest daughter of Karl Anton, Prince of Hohenzollern-Sigmaringen, and Princess Josephine of Baden, by proxy in Berlin on 29 April 1858 and then in person in Lisbon on 18 May 1858.

Among the many wedding guests in Lisbon was Stephanie's brother Prince Karl Anton Joachim Zephyrinus Friedrich Meinrad von Hohenzollern, Commanding General of the VII Prussian Army Corps, accompanied by Major Reimar Constantin von Alvensleben.

It was a happy marriage until Queen Stephanie died a year later from diphtheria. As Peter and Stephanie's marriage was childless, the Portuguese throne passed to his brother Luís.

== Titles, styles and honours ==
=== Titles and styles ===
Royal styles of King Peter V of Portugal
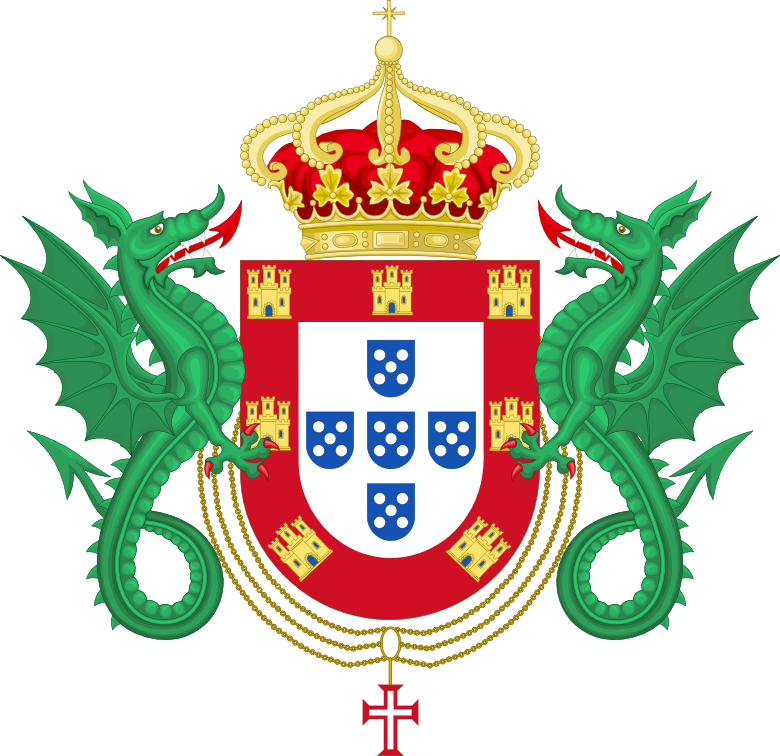
- Reference style: His Most Faithful Majesty
- Spoken style: Your Most Faithful Majesty

Pedro V's official styling as King of Portugal: By the Grace of God and by the Constitution of the Monarchy, Peter V, King of Portugal and the Algarves, of either side of the sea in Africa, Lord of Guinea and of Conquest, Navigation, and Commerce of Ethiopia, South Africa, Arabia, Persia and India, etc.

As heir apparent to the Portuguese crown, Peter held the following titles:

- Duke of Braganza (23rd)
- Duke of Barcelos (18th)
- Duke of Guimarães (20th)
- Marquis of Vila Viçosa (22nd)
- Count of Ourém (24th)
- Count of Barcelos (24th)
- Count of Faria and Neiva (24th)
- Count of Arraiolos (26th)
- Count of Guimarães (21st)

=== Honours ===
Domestic

- He was Grand Master of the following orders:
  - Order of Our Lord Jesus Christ
  - Order of Saint Benedict of Aviz
  - Order of Saint James of the Sword
  - Order of the Tower and Sword
  - Order of the Immaculate Conception of Vila Viçosa

Foreign

- Austrian Empire: Grand Cross the Royal Hungarian Order of St. Stephen, 1854
- Belgium: Grand Cordon of the Order of Leopold, 9 July 1854
- Empire of Brazil: Grand Cross of the Southern Cross, 1855
- (Saxe-Coburg and Gotha) (Duchy of Saxe-Altenburg) (Saxe-Meiningen) Ernestine duchies: Grand Cross of the Saxe-Ernestine House Order
- French Empire: Grand Cross of the Legion of Honour
- (Hohenzollern-Sigmaringen) Hohenzollern: Cross of Honour of the Princely House Order of Hohenzollern, 1st Class
- Netherlands: Grand Cross of the Netherlands Lion
- Kingdom of Prussia: Knight of the Black Eagle
- Russian Empire:
  - Knight of St. Andrew, 13 March 1856
  - Knight of St. Alexander Nevsky, 13 March 1856
  - Knight of the White Eagle, 13 March 1856
  - Knight of St. Anna, 1st Class, 13 March 1856
- Kingdom of Sardinia:
  - Knight of the Annunciation, 15 July 1855
  - Grand Cross of Saints Maurice and Lazarus, 15 July 1855
- Saxe-Weimar-Eisenach: Grand Cross of the White Falcon, 1 August 1854
- Kingdom of Saxony: Knight of the Rue Crown, 1854
- Spain: Knight of the Golden Fleece, 13 November 1846
- Two Sicilies: Grand Cross of St. Ferdinand and Merit
- United Kingdom: Stranger Knight of the Garter, 24 June 1858

== Ancestry ==
Ancestors of Pedro V of Portugal

8. Francis, Duke of Saxe-Coburg-Saalfeld
4. Prince Ferdinand of Saxe-Coburg and Gotha
9. Countess Augusta Reuss of Ebersdorf
2. Fernando II of Portugal
10. Ferenc József, Prince Koháry de Csábrág et Szitnya
5. Princess Mária Antónia Koháry de Csábrág et Szitnya
11. Countess Maria Antonia von Waldstein zu Wartenberg
1. Pedro V of Portugal
12. João VI of Portugal
6. Pedro I of Brazil and IV of Portugal
13. Infanta Carlota Joaquina of Spain
3. Maria II of Portugal
14. Francis II, Holy Roman Emperor
7. Archduchess Leopoldina of Austria
15. Princess Maria Theresa of Naples and Sicily

== See also ==
- Dom Pedro V Theatre
- D. Pedro V High School

== Notes ==
Pedro V of Portugal House of Braganza-Saxe-Coburg and Gotha Cadet branch of the House of Aviz Born: 16 September 1837 Died: 11 November 1861
Regnal titles
Preceded by Maria II and Ferdinand II	King of Portugal; 1853–1861	Succeeded by Luís I
