= Ferdinand II of Portugal =

King of Portugal from 1837 to 1853

Ferdinand II
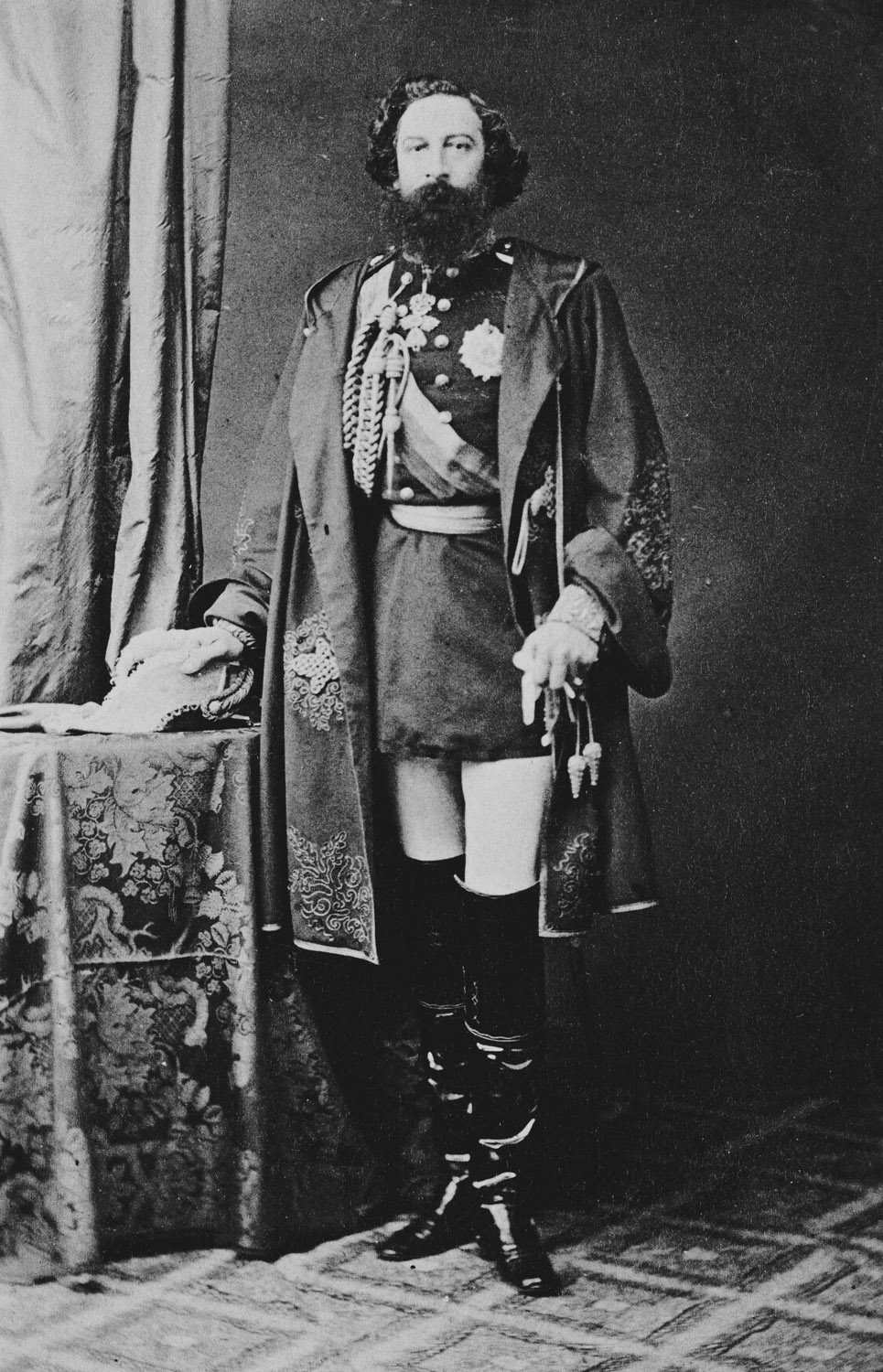
- Portrait, 1861

King of Portugal
- Reign: 16 September 1837 – 15 November 1853
- Predecessor: Maria II
- Successor: Pedro V
- Co-monarch: Maria II

Prince consort of Portugal
- Tenure: 9 April 1836 – 16 September 1837

Regent of Portugal
- Regency: 15 November 1853 – 16 September 1855
- Monarch: Pedro V
- Born: Prinz Ferdinand von Sachsen-Coburg-Saalfeld; 29 October 1816; Palais Coburg, Vienna, Austrian Empire
- Died: 15 December 1885 (aged 69); Necessidades Palace, Lisbon, Portugal
- Burial: 21 December 1885; Pantheon of the House of Braganza, Lisbon, Portugal
- Spouses: Maria II of Portugal (m. 1836; died 1853) Elise, Countess of Edla (m. 1869)
- Issue Detail: Pedro V Luís I Infante João, Duke of Beja; Maria Ana, Princess Georg of Saxony; Antónia, Princess of Hohenzollern; Infante Fernando; Infante Augusto, Duke of Coimbra
- House: Saxe-Coburg and Gotha-Koháry
- Father: Prince Ferdinand of Saxe-Coburg and Gotha
- Mother: Princess Mária Antónia Koháry de Csábrág et Szitnya

Dom Ferdinand II (German: Ferdinand August Franz Anton Koháry von Sachsen-Coburg-Gotha; 29 October 1816 – 15 December 1885), also known as Ferdinand of Saxe-Coburg and Gotha and as "the King-artist" (Portuguese: o Rei-Artista), was King of Portugal from 16 September 1837 to 15 November 1853 as the husband and co-ruler of Queen Maria II.

In keeping with Portuguese law, Ferdinand only became king after the birth of his first son, Prince Pedro, in 1837. Ferdinand's reign came to an end with the death of his wife in 1853, but he served as regent for his son and successor, King Pedro V, until 1855.

He retained the style and title of king even after the death of Maria II and her succession by their sons Pedro V and then Luís I. His sons were reigning kings, while Ferdinand himself was a king-father during their reigns.

== Early life ==
Born Ferdinand August Franz Anton in Vienna on 29 October 1816, he was the eldest son of Prince Ferdinand of Saxe-Coburg-Saalfeld and Princess Mária Antónia Koháry de Csábrág et Szitnya, heiress to the House of Koháry. The younger Ferdinand grew up in several places: the family estates in modern-day Slovakia, the imperial court of Austria, and Germany. He was a nephew of King Leopold I of Belgium, and thus a first cousin to Leopold II of Belgium and Empress Carlota of Mexico, as well as Queen Victoria of the United Kingdom and her husband Prince Albert of Saxe-Coburg and Gotha. In 1826, his title changed from Prince of Saxe-Coburg-Saalfeld to Prince of Saxe-Coburg and Gotha, following the re-arrangement of the Saxon duchies.

== King of Portugal ==
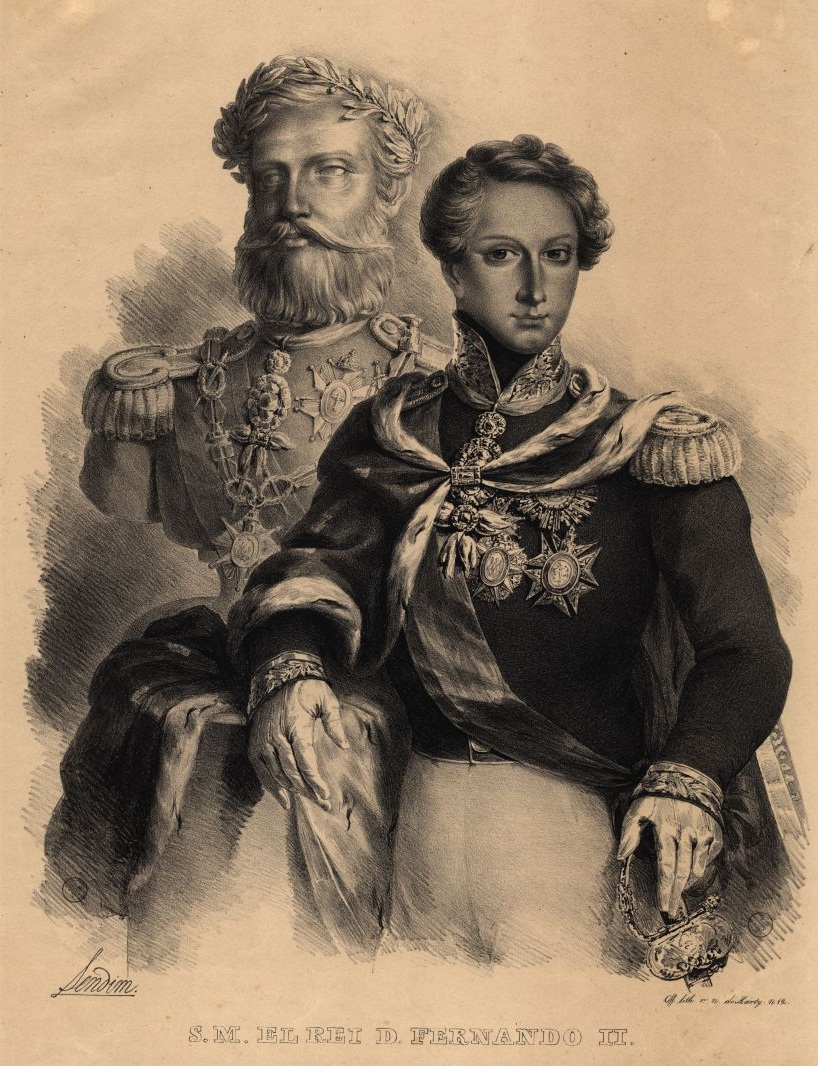
Ferdinand II around age 24, standing next to a bust of King Pedro IV, c. 1840.

According to Portuguese law, the husband of a queen regnant could only be titled king after the birth of an heir from that marriage; this was the reason Maria II's first husband, Auguste de Beauharnais, Duke of Leuchtenberg, never acquired the title of king. After the birth of their eldest son and heir, the future Pedro V of Portugal, Ferdinand was proclaimed King Dom Fernando II.

Although it was Maria who reigned by right, the royal couple formed an effective team during their joint reign, with Ferdinand reigning by himself during his wife's pregnancies.

Eventually, Maria II died as a result of the birth of their eleventh child, and Ferdinand II's reign ended. However, he would assume the regency of Portugal from 1853 to 1855, during the minority of his son King Pedro V.

== Later life ==
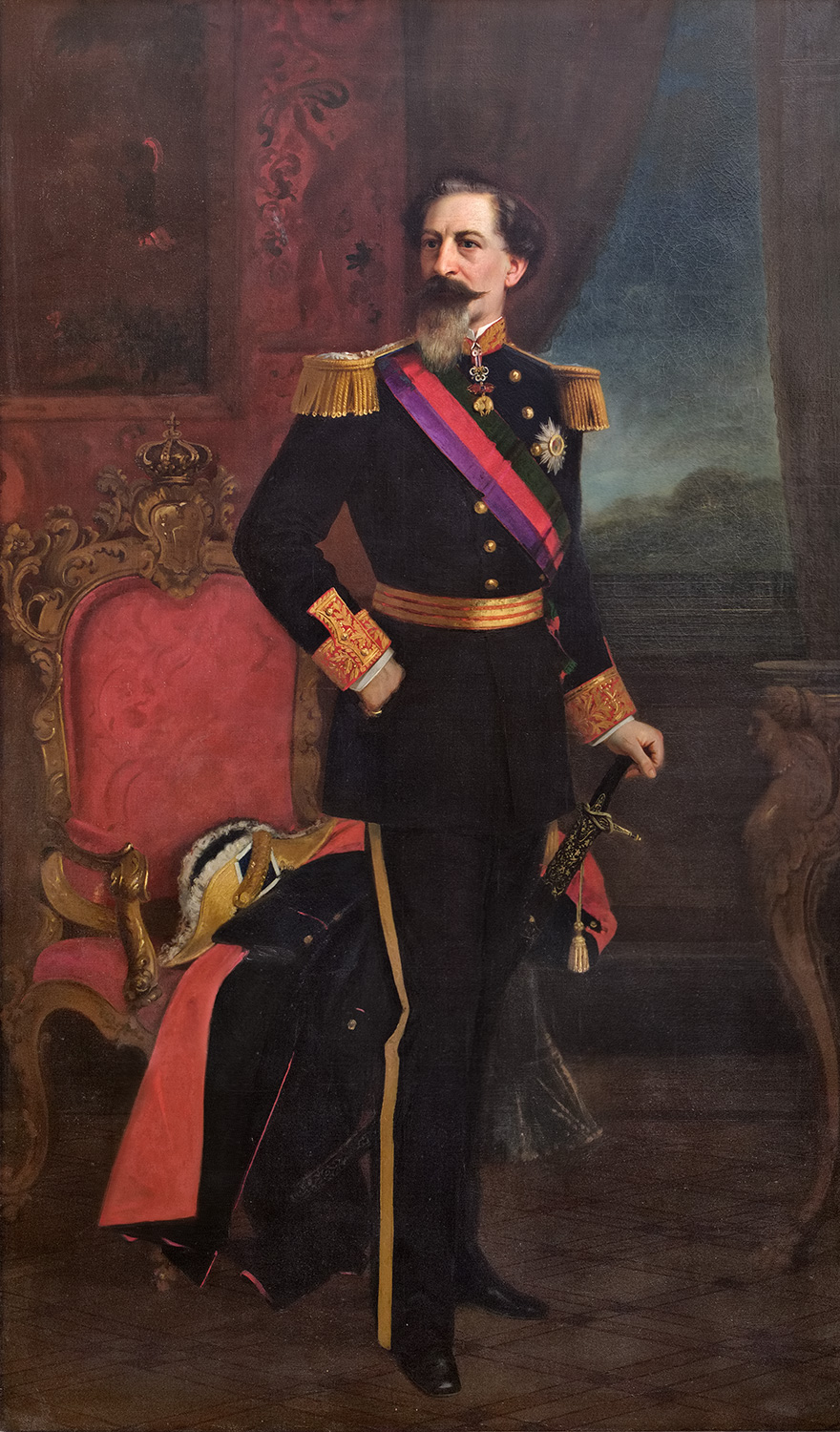
Portrait by Joseph Layraud, c. 1877. Displayed at Pena National Palace.

Ferdinand was an intelligent and artistically minded man with modern and liberal ideas. He was adept at etching, pottery and painting aquarelles. He was the president of the Royal Academy of Sciences and the Arts, Lord Protector of the University of Coimbra and Grand-Master of the Rosicrucians.

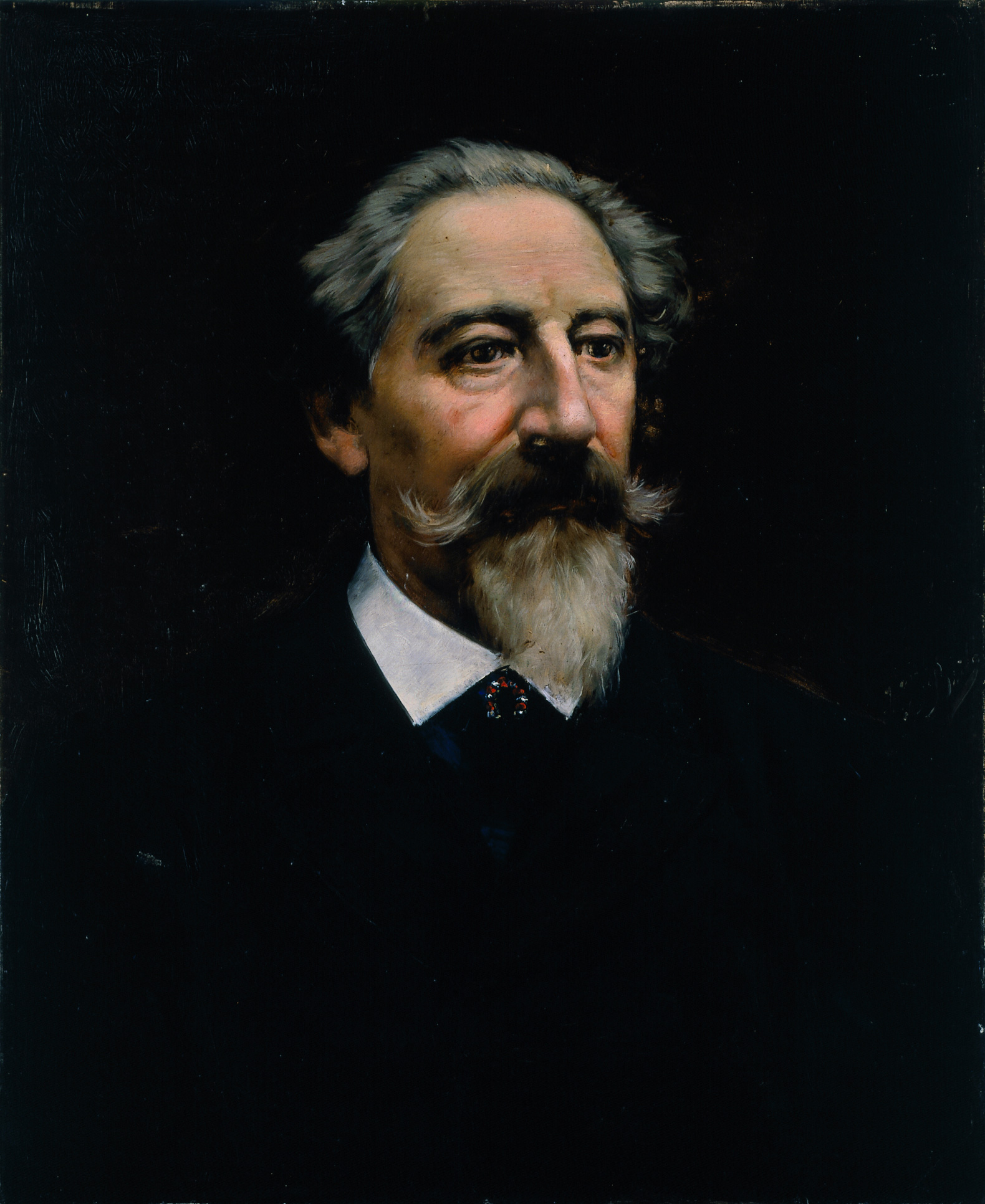
An elderly Ferdinand

In 1838, he acquired the former Hieronymite monastery of Our Lady of Pena, which had been built by King Manuel I in 1511 on the top of the hill above Sintra and had been left unoccupied since 1834, when the religious orders were suppressed in Portugal. The monastery consisted of the cloister and its outbuildings, the chapel, the sacristy and the bell tower, which today form the northern section of the Pena National Palace (the "Old Palace").

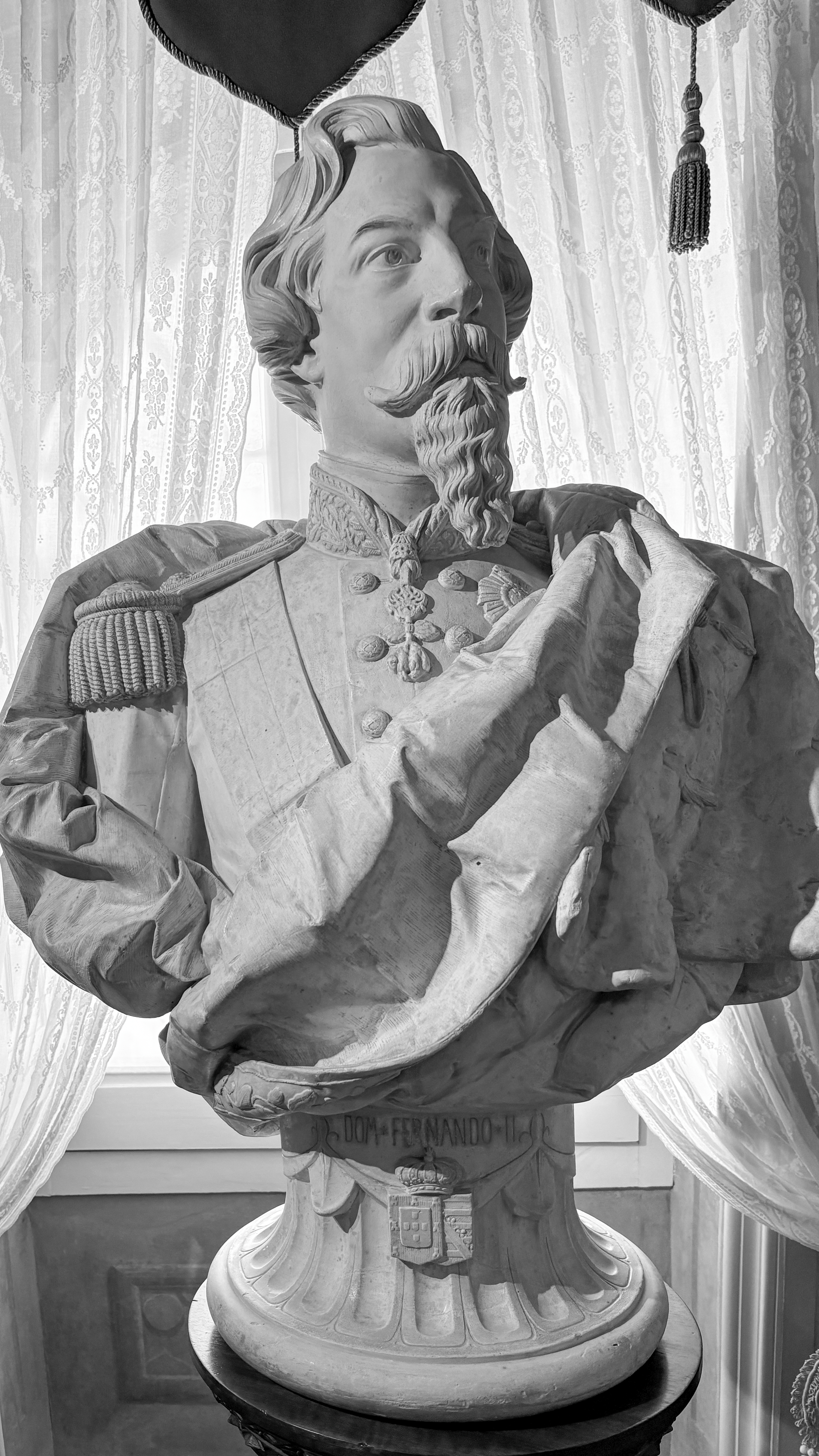
Bathed in soft light at Sintra's Palácio da Pena, this marble bust of King Ferdinand II embodies the Romantic spirit of his reign and his devotion to art, architecture, and beauty—his legacy etched in Portugal's nineteenth-century grandeur.

Ferdinand began by making repairs to the former monastery, which, according to the historical sources of that time, was in poor condition. He refurbished the whole of the upper floor, replacing the fourteen cells used by the monks with larger-sized rooms and covering them with the vaulted ceilings that can still be seen today. In 1843, the king decided to enlarge the palace by building a new wing (the New Palace) with even larger rooms (one of them being the Great Hall), ending in a circular tower next to the new kitchens. The building work was directed by the Baron von Eschwege, a wild architectural fantasy in an eclectic style full of symbolism that could be compared with the castle Neuschwanstein of King Ludwig II of Bavaria. The palace was built in such a way as to be visible from any point in the park, which consists of a forest and luxuriant gardens with over five hundred different species of trees originating from the four corners of the earth. Ferdinand would spend his last years in this castle with his second wife, receiving the greatest artists of his time.

=== Death ===
When he was 60, Ferdinand suffered from facial cancer that severely disfigured him and kept him away from public life. On 12 December 1885, due to double vision caused by the tumor, he tripped when going down the stairs to the foyer of the São Carlos Theater, violently hitting his head against a wall and fell into a coma, dying three days after. In his will, he left almost all his assets to his second wife, which caused a public commotion.

He rests next to Maria II, his first wife, in the Pantheon of the House of Braganza, in São Vicente de Fora, Lisbon.

== Marriages and descendants ==
On 9 April 1836, Ferdinand married Queen Maria II of Portugal. Eleven children were born to the royal couple before Maria died of complications due to childbirth in 1853. Ferdinand was destined to outlive eight of his eleven children. In late 1861, an attack of cholera or typhoid fever struck the royal family and Ferdinand suffered the tragedy of witnessing the death of three of his five surviving sons.

Later in his life, Ferdinand married again in Lisbon on 10 June 1869 to actress Elisa Hensler (Neuchâtel, 22 May 1836 – Lisbon, Coração de Jesus, 21 May 1929). Just before the marriage, she was styled Gräfin (Countess) von Edla by Ferdinand's cousin Ernest II, Duke of Saxe-Coburg and Gotha. The couple had no children.

Name	Birth	Death	Notes
By Maria II of Portugal (4 April 1819 – 15 November 1853; married on 9 April 1836)
Pedro V	16 September 1837	11 November 1861	Succeeded his mother as King of Portugal.
Luís I	31 October 1838	19 October 1889	Succeeded his brother as King of Portugal.
Infanta Maria	4 October 1840	4 October 1840	Stillborn.
Infante João	16 March 1842	27 December 1861	Duke of Beja. Died of cholera in 1861.
Infanta Maria Ana	21 August 1843	5 February 1884	Married King George of Saxony and was the mother of King Frederick August III of Saxony, and the maternal grandmother of Charles I, the last Emperor of Austria.
Infanta Antónia	17 February 1845	27 December 1913	Married Leopold, Prince of Hohenzollern and was the mother of King Ferdinand I of Romania.
Infante Fernando	23 July 1846	6 November 1861	Died of cholera in 1861.
Infante Augusto	4 November 1847	26 September 1889	Duke of Coimbra.
Infante Leopoldo	7 May 1849	7 May 1849	Stillborn.
Infanta Maria	3 February 1851	3 February 1851	Stillborn.
Infante Eugénio	15 November 1853	15 November 1853	Stillborn.

== Ancestry ==
Ancestors of Ferdinand II of Portugal

8. Ernest Frederick, Duke of Saxe-Coburg-Saalfeld
4. Francis, Duke of Saxe-Coburg-Saalfeld
9. Duchess Sophie Antoinette of Brunswick-Wolfenbüttel
2. Prince Ferdinand of Saxe-Coburg and Gotha
10. Heinrich XXIV, Count Reuss of Ebersdorf
5. Countess Augusta Reuss of Ebersdorf
11. Countess Karoline Ernestine of Erbach-Schönberg
1. Prince Ferdinand of Saxe-Coburg and Gotha
12. Ignác József, Count Koháry de Csábrág et Szitnya
6. Ferenc József, Prince Koháry de Csábrág et Szitnya
13. Countess Maria Gabriella Cavriani
3. Princess Mária Antónia Koháry de Csábrág et Szitnya
14. Count Georg Christian von Waldstein zu Wartenberg
7. Countess Maria Antonia von Waldstein zu Wartenberg
15. Countess Elisabeth Ulfeldt

== Honours ==
Royal styles of King Fernando II of Portugal
- Reference style: His Majesty
- Spoken style: Your Majesty

Portuguese orders and decorations

- Grand Cross of the Sash of the Three Orders, 9 December 1835 – wedding gift of his bride, Queen Maria II
- Grand Cross of the Tower and Sword
- Grand Cross of the Immaculate Conception of Vila Viçosa
- Gold Medal of Distinguished Service

Foreign orders and decorations

- Austrian Empire: Grand Cross of St. Stephen, 1843
- Belgium: Grand Cordon of the Order of Leopold, 15 July 1835
- Empire of Brazil:
  - Grand Cross of the Southern Cross
  - Grand Cross of the Order of Pedro I
  - Grand Cross of the Rose
- Denmark: Knight of the Elephant, 12 April 1841
- (Saxe-Coburg and Gotha) (Duchy of Saxe-Altenburg) (Saxe-Meiningen) Ernestine duchies: Grand Cross of the Saxe-Ernestine House Order, December 1835
- Kingdom of France: Grand Cross of the Legion of Honour
- Netherlands: Grand Cross of the Netherlands Lion
- Kingdom of Prussia:
  - Knight of the Black Eagle, 11 January 1845; with Collar, 1862
  - Grand Cross of the Red Eagle
- Russian Empire:
  - Knight of St. Andrew, September 1850
  - Knight of St. Alexander Nevsky, September 1850
  - Knight of the White Eagle, September 1850
  - Knight of St. Anna, 1st Class, September 1850
- Kingdom of Sardinia:
  - Knight of the Annunciation, 16 August 1849
  - Grand Cross of Saints Maurice and Lazarus, 1849
- Kingdom of Saxony:
  - Knight of the Rue Crown, 1840
  - Grand Cross of the Military Order of St. Henry
- Spain: Knight of the Golden Fleece, 16 October 1838
- Sweden-Norway: Knight of the Seraphim, with Collar, 15 February 1852
- Two Sicilies: Grand Cross of St. Ferdinand and Merit

== Notes ==
Ferdinand II of Portugal House of Saxe-Coburg and Gotha Cadet branch of the House of Wettin Born: 13 May 1767 Died: 10 March 1826
Regnal titles
Preceded by Maria II as sole monarch	King of Portugal; 16 September 1837 – 15 November 1853 with Maria II	Succeeded by Pedro V
Portuguese royalty
Vacant Title last held by Auguste de Beauharnais	Prince consort of Portugal; 9 April 1836 – 16 September 1837	Vacant Title next held by Stephanie of Hohenzollern-Sigmaringen as queen consort
