= Maria II of Portugal =

Queen of Portugal (1826–1828, 1834–1853)

Maria II
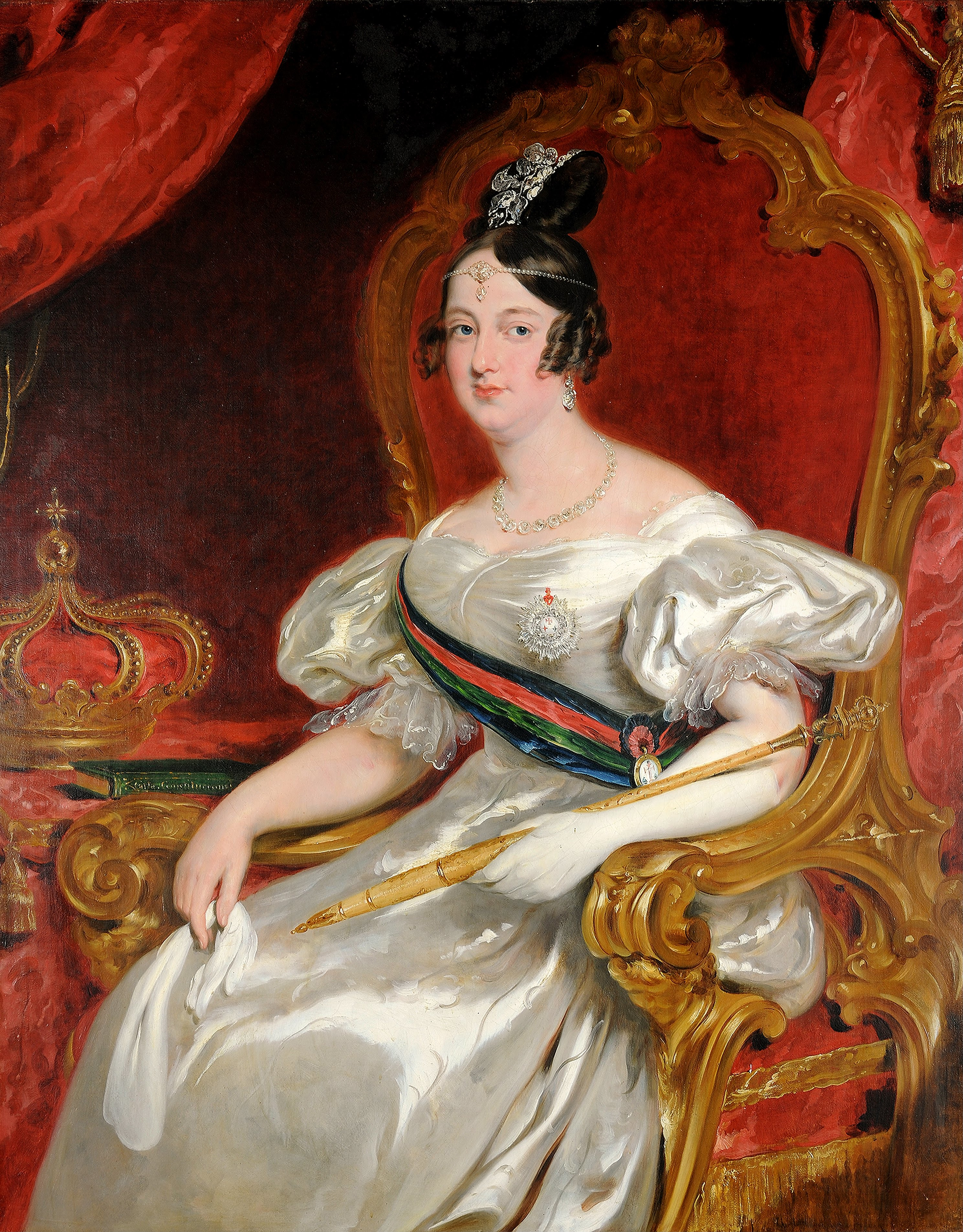
- Portrait, 1837

Queen of Portugal
- 1st reign: 2 May 1826 – 11 July 1828
- Predecessor: Pedro IV
- Successor: Miguel I
- Regents: Infanta Isabel Maria (1826–1828); Infante Miguel, Duke of Beja (Feb–Jul 1828)
- 2nd reign: 26 May 1834 – 15 November 1853
- Acclamation: 20 September 1834
- Predecessor: Miguel I
- Successor: Pedro V
- Co-monarch: Fernando II (1837–1853)
- Regent: Pedro IV (May–Sep 1834)
- Born: 4 April 1819; Palace of São Cristóvão, Rio de Janeiro, Kingdom of Brazil
- Died: 15 November 1853 (aged 34); Necessidades Palace, Lisbon, Kingdom of Portugal
- Burial: 19 November 1853; Pantheon of the House of Braganza
- Spouses: Auguste de Beauharnais, 2nd Duke of Leuchtenberg (m. 1835; died 1835) Ferdinand of Saxe-Coburg and Gotha-Kohary (m. 1836)
- Issue Detail: Pedro V, King of Portugal; Luís I, King of Portugal; Infante João, Duke of Beja; Maria Ana, Princess Georg of Saxony; Antónia, Princess of Hohenzollern; Infante Fernando; Infante Augusto, Duke of Coimbra
Names
- Maria da Glória Joana Carlota Leopoldina da Cruz Francisca Xavier de Paula Isidora Micaela Gabriela Rafaela Gonzaga de Habsburgo-Lorena e Bragança
- House: Braganza
- Father: Pedro I of Brazil
- Mother: Maria Leopoldina of Austria

Dona Maria II (Maria da Glória Joana Carlota Leopoldina da Cruz Francisca Xavier de Paula Isidora Micaela Gabriela Rafaela Gonzaga de Habsburgo-Lorena e Bragança; 4 April 1819 – 15 November 1853) also known as "the Educator" (Portuguese: a Educadora) or as "the Good Mother" (a Boa Mãe), was Queen of Portugal from 1826 to 1828, and again from 1834 to 1853. Her supporters considered her to be the rightful queen also during the period between her two reigns.

Maria was born in Rio de Janeiro during the reign of her paternal grandfather, King Dom João VI. She was the first child of the Duke and Duchess of Braganza, who later became Emperor Dom Pedro I and Empress Dona Maria Leopoldina of Brazil. In 1826, her father became king of Portugal but quickly abdicated in favour of the seven-year-old Maria. Both Pedro and Maria remained in Brazil, and her aunt Dona Isabel Maria initially served as regent for them in Portugal. Later, Emperor Pedro's brother Miguel replaced Isabel Maria as regent and was to marry Maria when she came of age. However, a few months after Miguel's arrival in Portugal in early 1828, he deposed the absent Maria and declared himself king, thus beginning the Liberal Wars over royal succession. Maria remained outside Portugal throughout her first reign, finally arriving in Gibraltar just in time to learn of her deposition. She proceeded to England and then returned to Brazil. In 1831, her father (having abdicated the Brazilian throne) returned to Europe with his daughter and led a military expedition in support of Maria's claim while she pursued her education in France. She finally set foot in Portugal for the first time in 1833 after Lisbon was occupied by forces supporting her. In 1834, Miguel was forced to abdicate and Maria was restored as undisputed queen. She remained a member of the Brazilian imperial family until 1835 when she was excluded from the Brazilian line of succession by law.

Maria's second reign was marked by continued political turmoil. In January 1835, she married Auguste, Duke of Leuchtenberg, who died two months after their marriage. In April 1836, Maria remarried to Prince Ferdinand of Saxe-Coburg and Gotha-Kohary. Maria's second husband was proclaimed King Dom Fernando II a year later in accordance with Portuguese law following the birth of their first child, Pedro. Maria faced a series of difficult pregnancies and ultimately died in childbirth in 1853 at the age of 34. She was succeeded by her eldest son, Dom Pedro V.

== Early life ==
=== Birth ===
Maria II was born Maria da Glória Joana Carlota Leopoldina da Cruz Francisca Xavier de Paula Isidora Micaela Gabriela Rafaela Gonzaga on 4 April 1819 in the Palace of São Cristóvão in Rio de Janeiro, Kingdom of Brazil. She was the eldest daughter of Prince Dom Pedro de Alcântara, future King of Portugal as Pedro IV and first Emperor of Brazil as Pedro I, and his first wife Dona Maria Leopoldina (née Archduchess Caroline Josepha Leopoldine of Austria), herself the daughter of Francis II, Holy Roman Emperor. She was titled Princess of Beira upon her birth. Born in Brazil, Maria was the only European monarch to have been born outside of Europe, though she was still born in Portuguese territory.

=== Succession crisis ===
The death of Maria's paternal grandfather, King Dom João VI, in March 1826 sparked a succession crisis in Portugal. The king had a male heir, Dom Pedro, but Pedro had proclaimed the independence of Brazil in 1822 with himself as Emperor. The late king also had a younger son, Infante Dom Miguel, but he was exiled to Austria after leading a number of rebellions against his father and his liberal regime.

Before his death, the king had nominated his favourite daughter, Dona Isabel Maria, to serve as regent until "the legitimate heir returned to the kingdom" – but he had failed to specify which of his sons was the legitimate heir: the liberal Emperor Dom Pedro I in Brazil or the absolutist, exiled Miguel in Austria.

Most people considered Pedro to be the legitimate heir, but Brazil did not want him to unite the Portuguese and Brazilian thrones again. Aware that his brother's supporters were ready to bring Miguel back and put him on the throne, Pedro decided for a more consensual option: he would renounce his claim to the Portuguese throne in favor of his eldest daughter Maria (who was only seven years old), and that she was to marry her uncle Miguel, who would accept the liberal constitution and act as a regent until his niece reached the age of majority.

During her first reign, Maria remained in Brazil with her father, and her aunt Isabel Maria continued to serve as regent until Miguel agreed to his brother's plan and returned to replace her in that role in early 1828. Miguel pretended to accept the agreement, but a few months after his arrival in Portugal he deposed Maria and proclaimed himself king, abrogating the liberal constitution in the process. Maria had finally sailed from Brazil a few days earlier, escorted by the Marquis of Barbacena. She was expected to land in Genoa and proceed from there to her grandfather's court in Vienna.

=== Refuge in England and return to Brazil ===
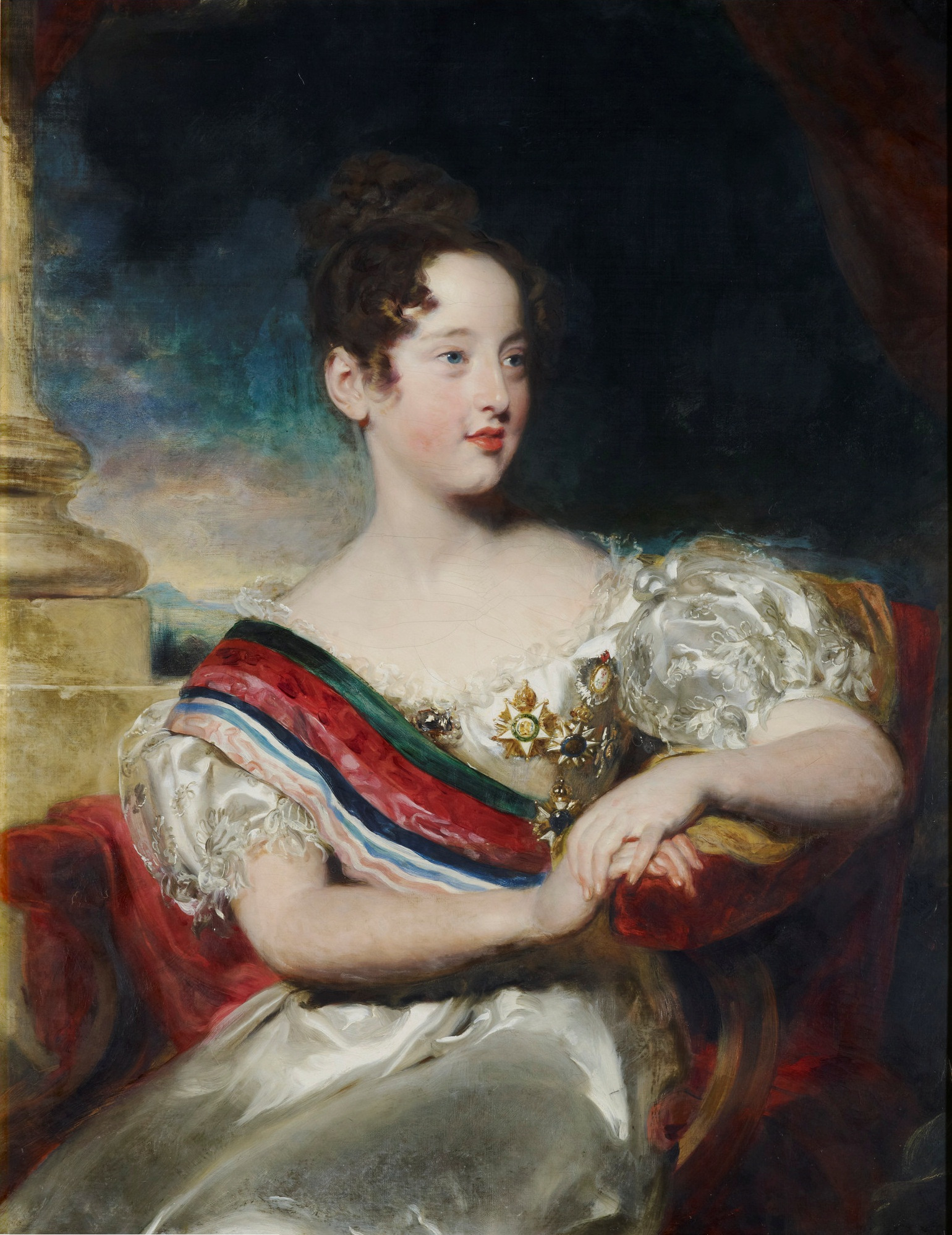
Portrait of Maria II by Thomas Lawrence. Maria II at age 10, 1829.

Maria's first reign was interrupted by the coup d'état led by her uncle, fiancé and regent Miguel, who was proclaimed King of Portugal on 11 July 1828, thus beginning the Liberal Wars that lasted until 1834, the year in which Maria was restored to the throne and Miguel exiled to Germany.

The Marquis of Barbacena, arriving in Gibraltar with the Queen on 3 September 1828, was informed by an emissary of what was happening in Portugal. He had the foresight to understand that Miguel had come from Vienna determined to put himself at the head of the absolutist movement, advised by Prince Klemens von Metternich, who was directing European politics, and so it was dangerous for the young Queen to go to Vienna. Taking responsibility, he changed the direction of the journey, and departed for London, where he arrived on 7 October. The Wellington–Peel ministry openly sponsored Miguel, so the asylum the Marquis had sought was not safe. Maria II was received in court with the honors due to her high rank, but the British prevented the Portuguese emigres from going to the garrison on Terceira Island.

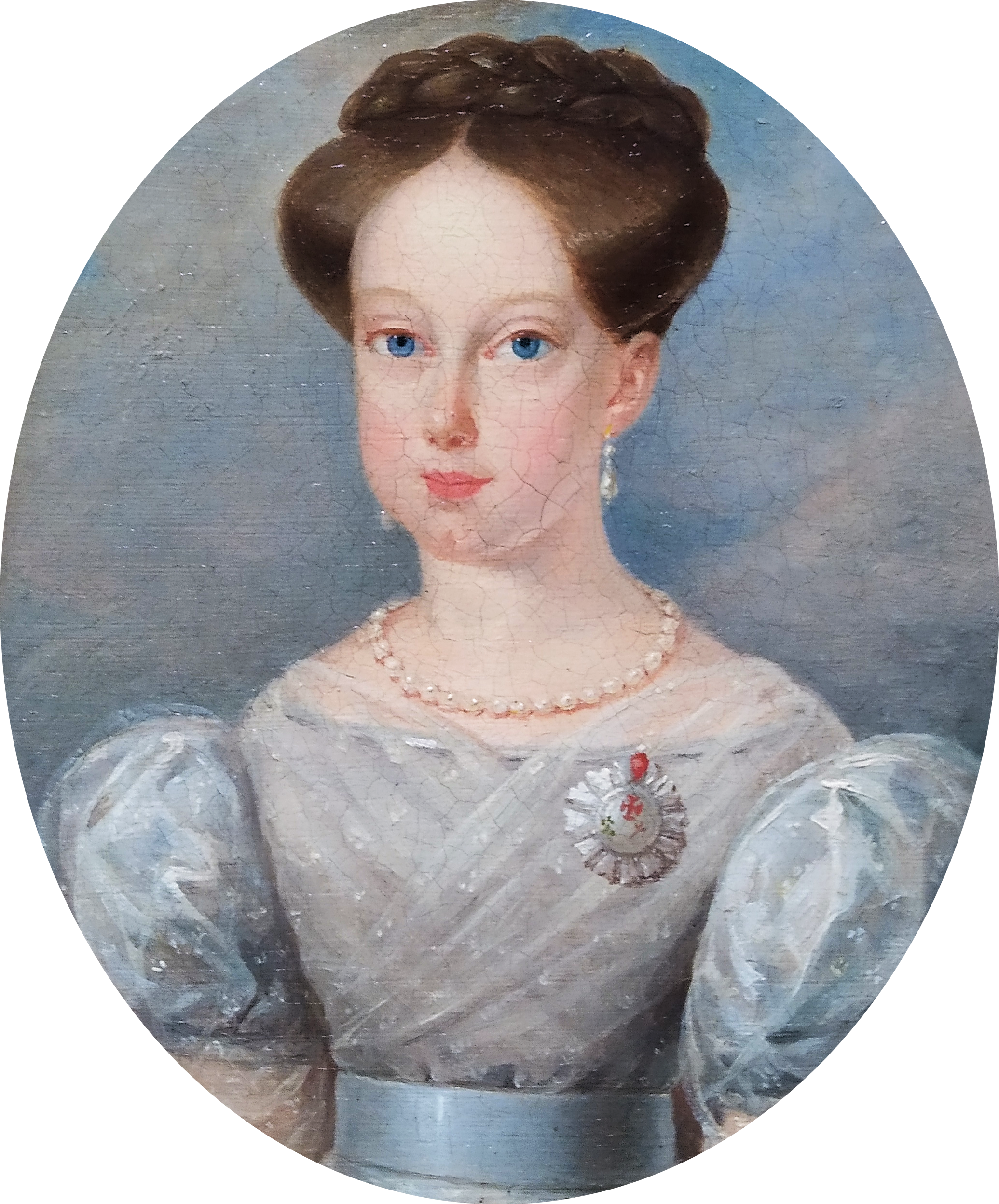
Portrait by Simplício de Sá, c. 1830.

Miguel's coup d'état had not gone unopposed. On 16 May 1828, the garrison of Porto revolted, and in Lagos, an infantry battalion did likewise. The revolts were stifled. Saldanha, Palmela, and others, who had come to take charge of the movement in Porto, re-embarked on the ship Belfast, which had brought them; the Porto garrison, reinforced by the academic volunteers of Coimbra and other liberal troops, emigrated to Galiza and from there to England. In January 1829, at the head of a small liberal expedition, the Marquis of Saldanha attempted to disembark in Terceira, Azores, but was prevented from doing so by the British frigate HMS Ranger, which was unable to prevent the Count of Vila Flor from disembarking on 22 June 1829. In time, because in August 1829 appeared in front of the island a large Miguelist squadron that landed a body of disembarkation. A battle ensued on 11 August in the village of Praia, where the Miguelists were defeated. When the emigrants in England received the news of the victory, they felt great enthusiasm. They soon lost hope when they found out that the young Queen was returning to Brazil. In fact, Maria II's situation in the British court, alongside the unfriendly attitude of the Wellington–Peel ministry, became embarrassing and humiliating. The Queen left London for Portsmouth to join the ship carrying her new stepmother, Amélie of Leuchtenberg, from Ostend to Brazil. They left together on 30 August 1829 for Rio de Janeiro, arriving on 16 October.

The constitutional cause was considered lost. The scattered emigrants (France, England, and Brazil) were divided into rival factions. Only Terceira Island recognized constitutional principles, and even there, Miguelist guerrillas emerged, and Maria remained there for four months. France was ready to recognize Miguel's government when the July Revolution broke out in Paris in 1830, which emboldened Portuguese liberals.

=== Civil war ===
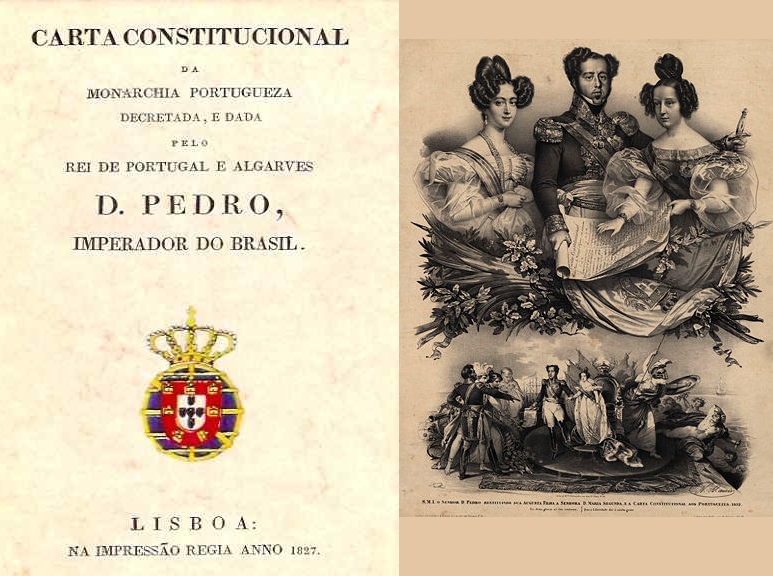
The Constitutional Charter of 1826 and the royal family.

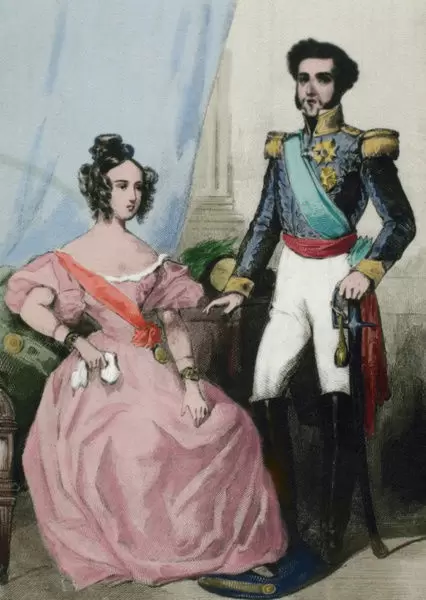
Maria II and her father Emperor-King Pedro I and IV (undated).

On 7 April 1831, Dom Pedro I abdicated the imperial crown of Brazil on behalf of his son Dom Pedro II, Maria's younger brother, and came to Europe with his second wife and (sailing in a separate ship, and arriving later) his daughter to support Maria's rights to the crown of Portugal and join the forces loyal to her in the Azores in their war against Miguel. He took the title of Duke of Braganza, and of Regent in her name.

Almost at the same time, the regency of Terceira Island, named by Pedro and composed of the Marquis of Palmela, the Count of Vila Flor and José António Guerreiro, prepared an expedition that soon took possession of the Azores. While extending the constitutional territory, Pedro disembarked in France, being welcomed with sympathy by the new government and by Louis Philippe I. Miguel's government had defied the immunities of French subjects and had not at once satisfied the complaints of the French government, which had sent a squadron commanded by Admiral Roussin to force the bar of Lisbon and impose humiliating conditions of peace.

Pedro left his daughter in Paris to finish her education in the care of her stepmother, Empress Amélie, with good teachers, and left for the Azores at the head of an expedition organized on Belle Isle, bringing his supporters together. Arriving in the Azores on 3 March 1832, he formed a new ministry, assembled a small army, whose command he gave to the Count of Vila Flor, and giving command of the fleet to Admiral Sartorius, departed for mainland Portugal, disembarking on 8 July at Memória Beach in Matosinhos. It was followed by the Siege of Porto and a series of battles until, on 24 July 1833, the Duke of Terceira entered victorious in Lisbon, having won the Battle of Cova da Piedade the day before. Porto and Lisbon, the main cities, were in the power of the liberals.

Maria and her stepmother crossed from France to England, were received by King William IV and Queen Adelaide at Windsor, and then left for Portugal on a British naval ship, finally arriving in Lisbon for the first time in September 1833. Pedro pursued the war, eventually forcing his brother, Miguel, to abdicate in 1834. Maria was thereupon restored as undisputed queen, and obtained an annulment of her betrothal. Soon after her restoration to the throne and her declaration of majority (so that no further regents would be necessary, although she was still only 15), her father died from tuberculosis.

On 7 February 1833, in order to protect the Queen, the 2nd Lancers Regiment was created, first known as the Regimento de Lanceiros da Rainha (Queen's Lancers Regiment), with the motto Morte ou Glória, "Death or Glory" (the same as the 17th Lancers, since Lt. Col. Sir Anthony Bacon was its first commander), a fortunate coincidence since the queen's name was Maria da Glória.

Occupying the Portuguese throne, Maria II was still heir presumptive to her brother Pedro II as Princess Imperial of Brazil, until her exclusion from the Brazilian line of succession by law no. 91 of 30 October 1835.

== Consolidation ==
=== Reign ===
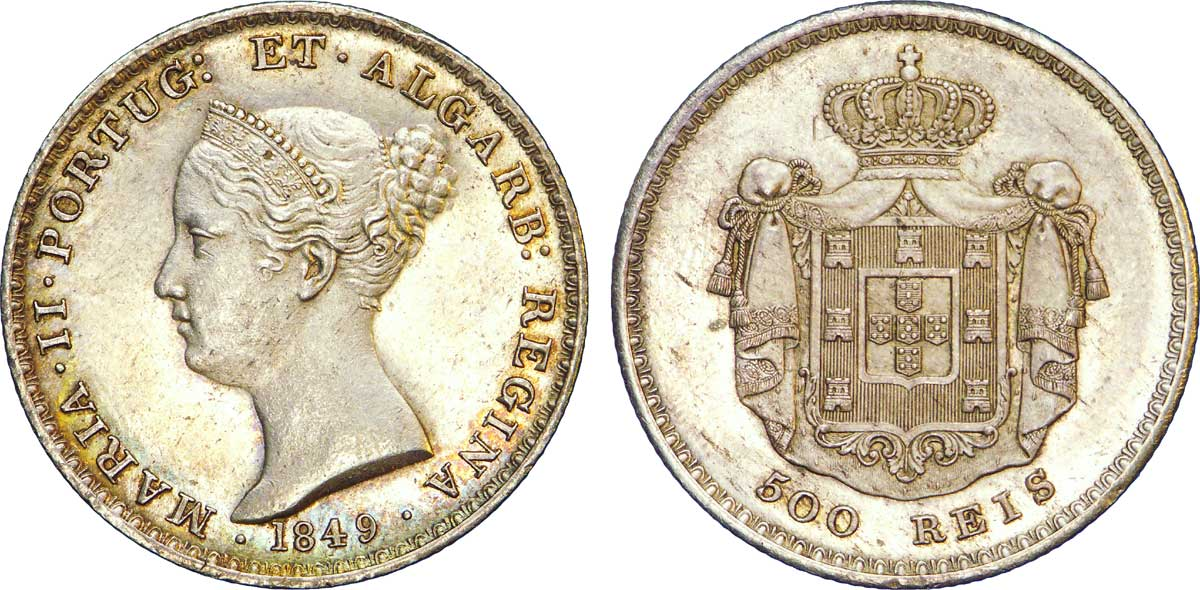
Effigy of Maria II, 1849.

Maria married Auguste, Duke of Leuchtenberg, son of Eugène de Beauharnais and grandson of Empress Josephine of France, on 26 January 1835, at the age of 15. However, he died only two months later on 28 March 1835.

On 9 April 1836, Maria married the cultured Prince Ferdinand of Saxe-Coburg and Gotha. In accordance with Portuguese law, he was proclaimed King Dom Fernando II upon the birth of their first child and heir, Pedro.

On 9 September 1836, Maria faced the September Revolution—an uprising sparked by dissatisfaction with the government's reforms and a crisis over the legitimacy of the Constitutional Charter of 1826. The movement led to the fall of the existing government and the end of Devorismo, resulting in the adoption of the Constitution of 1838. A royalist counter-coup later that year, known as the Belenzada, failed due to strong resistance from the army, National Guard, and Lisbon's population.

After the September Revolution, Portugal continued to experience political unrest, including the failed Revolt of the Marshals in 1837 and the Rossio massacre in 1838. In 1842, the statesman Costa Cabral seized power in a coup, restoring the Charter of 1826 with the support of the queen. Cabral went on to dominate Portuguese politics until 1846.

In 1842, Pope Gregory XVI presented Maria with a Golden Rose.

Maria's reign saw a revolutionary insurrection on 16 May 1846, known as the Revolution of Maria da Fonte, sparked by widespread discontent with new military, fiscal, and religious laws. The revolt led to the fall of the Cartista government, but when Queen Maria II dismissed its replacement in a palace coup on 6 October, it reignited the conflict. This triggered the Patuleia, or Little Civil War, between royalist forces and a coalition of Septembrists and Miguelists. The civil war ended in June 1847 with a victory for the royalists after foreign intervention. Portugal otherwise avoided the wider European Revolution of 1848.

Maria's reign was also notable for a public health act aimed at curbing the spread of cholera throughout the country. She also pursued policies aimed at raising the levels of education throughout the country.

=== Death ===
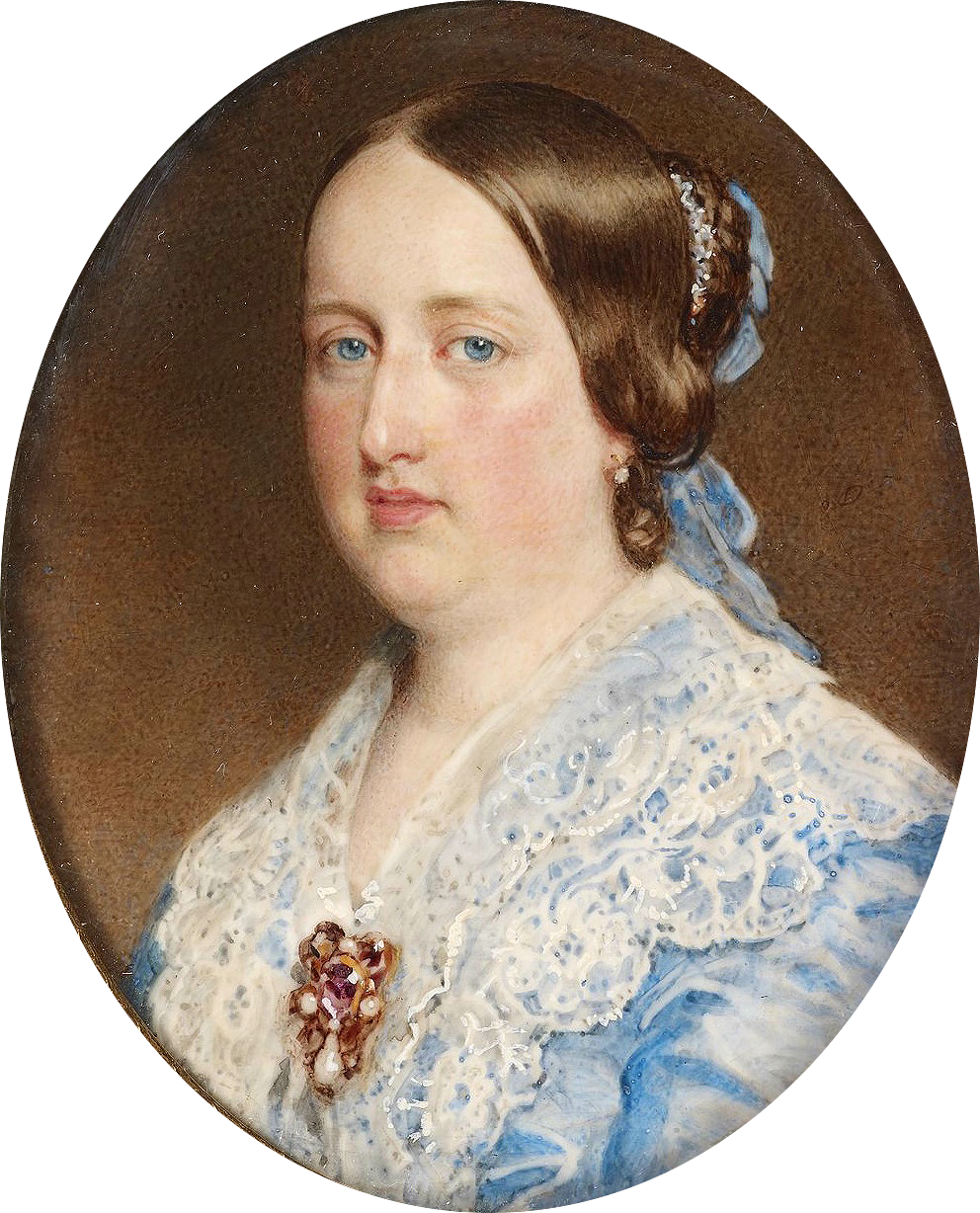
Portrait by William Charles Ross, 1852.

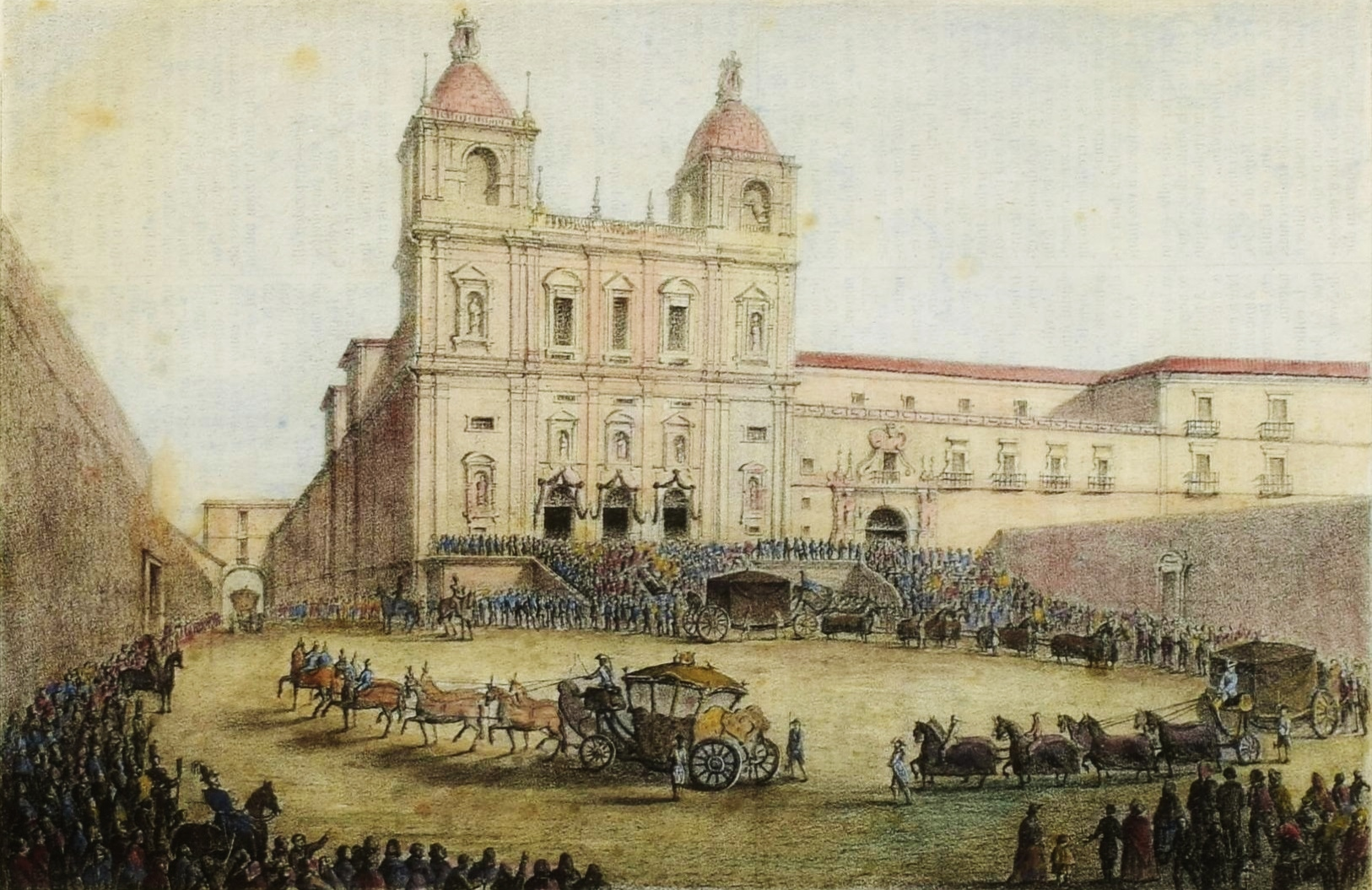
Arrival of the funeral procession of Maria II to the Monastery of São Vicente de Fora.

From her first pregnancy at the age of 18, Maria II faced problems in giving birth, with prolonged and extremely difficult labor. An example of this was her third pregnancy, whose labor lasted 32 hours, after which a girl was baptized in articulo mortis with the name of Maria (1840).

At 25 years of age and in her fifth pregnancy, Maria II became obese and her births became even more complicated. In 1847, the fetal distress that preceded the birth of her eighth child – Infante Augusto, Duke of Coimbra – brought to the world a child "quite purple and with little breathing".

The dangerous routine of successive pregnancies, coupled with obesity (which eventually caused her heart problems) and the frequency of dystocic births (worrisome, especially as a multiparous woman) led doctors to warn the queen about the serious risks she would face in future pregnancies. Indifferent to the warnings, Maria II merely replied: "If I die, I die at my post."

On 15 November 1853, 13 hours after the onset of labor of the stillborn Infante Eugénio, her eleventh child, Maria II died at the age of 34. The announcement of death was published in the Government Gazette of 16 November 1853:

Necessidades Palace, November 15, 1853, at half an hour after noon.

Her Majesty the Queen began to notice announcements of childbirth at nine-thirty of last night. Difficulties appeared in the progress of the same childbirth, which forced the doctors to resort to operations, through which the extraction of an Infante was obtained, of time, who received the baptism before being extracted.

The result of these operations took place at ten o'clock in the morning. Unfortunately, after an hour and a half, Her Majesty, exhausted from all strength, surrendered her soul to God, after having received all the sacraments.

- Francisco Elias Rodrigues da Silveira. Dr. Kessler. Ignacio António da Fonseca Benevides. António Joaquim Farto. Manuel Carlos Teixeira.

In a letter dated 28 November 1853, the Duchess of Ficalho, the queen's lady-in-waiting, reported the outcome to her brother, the 2nd Count of Lavradio:

At two o'clock after midnight from the 14th to the 15th, I was ordered to go to the Palace, where I arrived at about three o'clock. I found the Empress in the Queen's room, where I immediately entered, thinking Her Majesty troubled and even a little out of character. We stayed like that until five o'clock, and then we left the immediate room and asked Teixeira (Note: Manuel Carlos Teixeira, professor of the Medical-Surgical School of Lisbon and 1st private surgeon of the Royal Chamber (1856), dean of the Saint Joseph's Royal Hospital – where he served since 1819. He died in March 1877.) what he thought, to which he replied: "Her Majesty is going well, but slowly". I did not like it, and it was like that, until half past eight. It was then that Teixeira called the doctors, who were out and who had not seen the Queen, and as soon as they examined her, the horrible operation was decided. The doctors were Teixeira, Farto, (Note: António Joaquim Farto was a surgeon at Saint Joseph's Royal Hospital (1797), a surgeon who was accorded the honors of royal surgeon (1827), a nobleman of the Royal House (1827), director of the Medical-Surgical School of Lisbon (1830) and 1st surgeon of the Royal Chamber (1837). He died in October 1856.) Kessler, (Note: Dr. Friedrich Kessler (1804–1872), Doctor of Medicine and the personal physician to King Ferndinand II. He was a member of the Royal Academy of Sciences of Lisbon and 1st Baron of Kessler (1855).) Elias (Note: Dr. Francisco Elias Rodrigues da Silveira (1778–1864), bachelor of Philosophy and graduate in Medicine, member of His Most Faithful Majesty's Council, member of the Royal Academy of Sciences of Lisbon, 1st physician of the Royal Chamber, publicist and finally 1st Baron of Silveira (1855).) and Benevides. (Note: Dr. Inácio António da Fonseca Benevides (1788–1857), a bachelor of medicine (1813), was director of the Royal Academy of Sciences of Lisbon (1817), private physician of the Royal Chamber (1827), Chief Physician of the Royal Navy (1832), chairman of the Naval Health Council, adviser to the Council of His Majesty (1853) and publicist of scientific subjects.) Kessler immediately considered the case very dangerous.

The operation began. I climbed onto the bed. On the right side, the Empress, full of tears; the Queen, without fainting, but with a very bad look and, complaining that she was suffering a lot, said in her natural voice: "O Teixeira? If I am in danger, tell me; don't deceive me.

The Empress got down from the bed, and said to me: "The Queen must confess"; and immediately went to tell the King, who replied: "Call the Patriarch". By this time, Farto had already baptized the boy. The Patriarch entered, and the operation was not completely finished, and everything was horrible, but it was more than ten o'clock. When it was over, the Patriarch spoke to the Queen, who was in very bad shape, and told her to perform the act of contrition with him to absolve her, but, after this, Her Majesty was able to confess, receive the sacrament and be anointed, and at half past eleven o'clock she expired.

The Queen was saying: "- It is nothing like the other times". And she had already undergone an operation. I cannot explain the consternation of King Fernando and the entire Palace.

Owing to her image of being caring both towards her family and her country, Maria was later given the nickname "The Good Mother".

== Marriages and issue ==
Maria first married Auguste Charles, 2nd Duke of Leuchtenberg, son of Eugène de Beauharnais, grandson of Empress Josephine, on 26 January 1835. After his death, she married Ferdinand of Saxe-Coburg and Gotha, son of Prince Ferdinand of Saxe-Coburg and Gotha and Princess Maria Antonia Koháry de Csábrág, on 9 April 1836. They had eleven children.

Name	Birth	Death	Notes
Auguste de Beauharnais (9 December 1810 – 28 March 1835; married on 26 January 1835)
Ferdinand of Saxe-Coburg and Gotha (29 October 1816 – 15 December 1885; married on 9 April 1836)
Pedro V	16 September 1837	11 November 1861	Succeeded his mother as Peter V, 31st (or, according to some, 32nd) King of Portugal.
Luís I	31 October 1838	19 October 1889	Succeeded his brother, Pedro, as 32nd (or, according to some, 33rd) King of Portugal.
Infanta Maria	4 October 1840		Stillborn daughter.
Infante João	16 March 1842	27 December 1861	Duke of Beja
Infanta Maria Ana	21 August 1843	5 February 1884	Married King George of Saxony and was the mother of King Frederick August III of Saxony.
Infanta Antónia	17 February 1845	27 December 1913	Married Leopold, Prince of Hohenzollern, and was the mother of King Ferdinand I of Romania.
Infante Fernando	23 July 1846	6 November 1861	Died of typhoid fever at age 15.
Infante Augusto	4 November 1847	26 September 1889	Duke of Coimbra
Infante Leopoldo	7 May 1849		Stillborn son.
Infanta Maria	3 February 1851		Stillborn daughter.
Infante Eugénio	15 November 1853		Stillborn son.

== Honours ==
Royal styles of Queen Maria II of Portugal
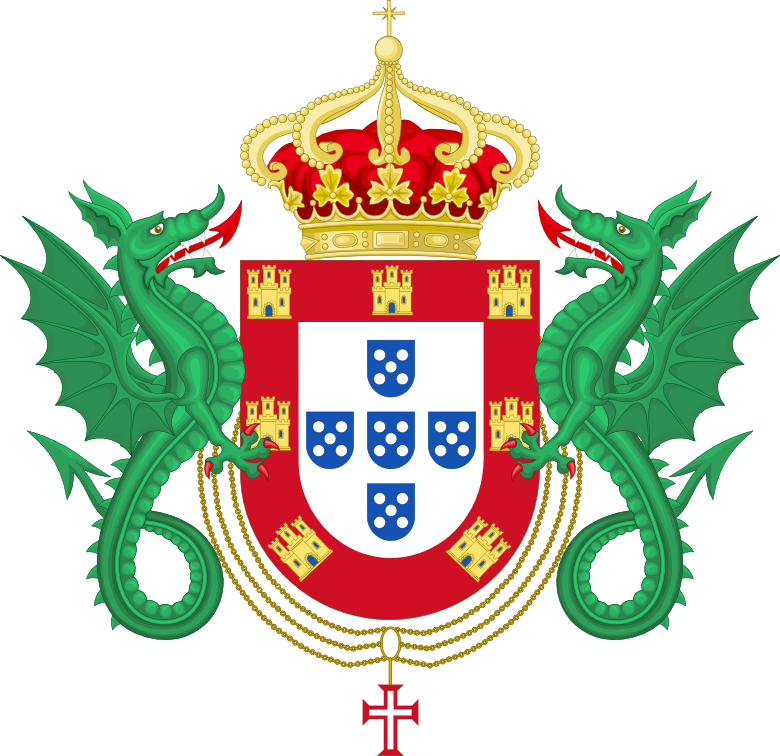
- Reference style: Her Most Faithful Majesty
- Spoken style: Your Most Faithful Majesty

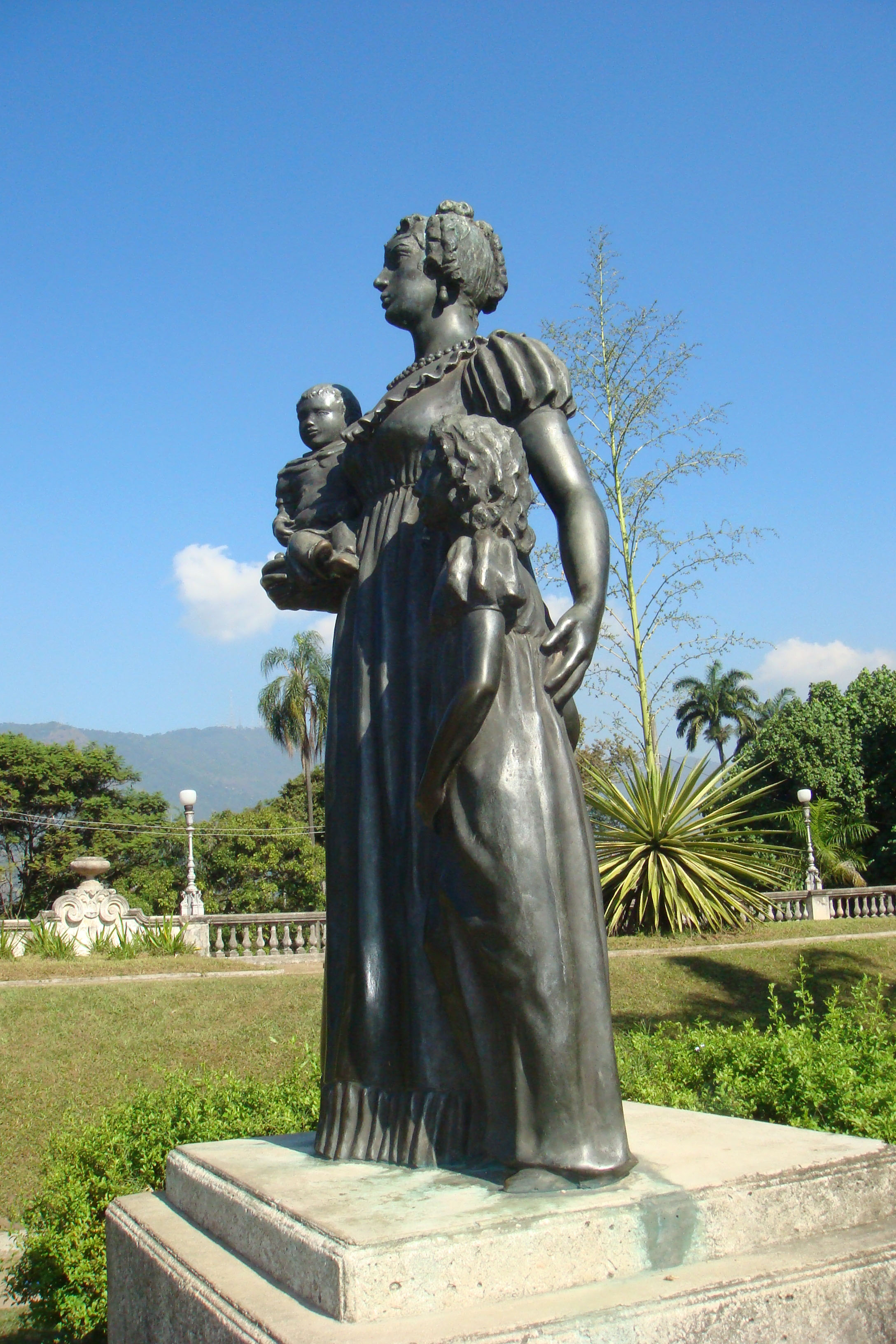
A sculpture depicting Maria II, then a Brazilian princess, with her mother and younger brother in the Palace of São Cristóvão gardens in her native Rio de Janeiro, Brazil

National honours

- Grand Master of the Three Orders
- Grand Master of the Order of the Tower and Sword
- Grand Master of the Order of the Immaculate Conception of Vila Viçosa
- Sovereign and Grand Mistress of the Order of Saint Isabel
- Brazil: Dame Grand Cross of the Order of the Southern Cross

Foreign honours

- Austria: Dame of the Order of the Starry Cross, 1st Class
- Russia: Dame Grand Cordon of the Order of Saint Catherine, September 1850
- Spain: Dame of the Order of Queen Maria Luisa, 27 May 1834
- Two Sicilies: Knight of the Order of Order of Saint Januarius
- Two Sicilies: Bailiff Knight Grand Cross with Collar of Justice of the Sacred Military Constantinian Order of Saint George

== Ancestry ==
Ancestors of Maria II of Portugal

8. Peter III of Portugal
4. John VI of Portugal
9. Maria I of Portugal
2. Pedro I of Brazil and IV of Portugal
10. Charles IV of Spain (brother of 13, 14)
5. Carlota Joaquina of Spain
11. Maria Luisa of Parma
1. Maria II of Portugal
12. Leopold II, Holy Roman Emperor (brother of 15)
6. Francis II, Holy Roman Emperor
13. Maria Luisa of Spain (sister of 10, 14)
3. Maria Leopoldina of Austria
14. Ferdinand I of the Two Sicilies (brother of 10, 13)
7. Maria Theresa of Naples and Sicily
15. Maria Carolina of Austria (sister of 12)

== In literature ==
In 1832, Letitia Elizabeth Landon published The Queen of Portugal, a poem protesting at her banishment and offering sympathy and hope for a peaceful restoration. This accompanied a vignette portrait of the Queen by James Holmes.

== See also ==
- Cape Verde
- São Tomé and Príncipe
- Portuguese India
- Portuguese East Africa
- Macau
- Portuguese Angola
- Portuguese Guinea
- Portuguese Timor

== Notes ==
Maria II of Portugal House of Braganza Cadet branch of the House of Aviz Born: 4 April 1819 Died: 15 November 1853
Regnal titles
Preceded by Pedro IV	Queen of Portugal; 1826–1828	Succeeded by Miguel
Preceded by Miguel	Queen of Portugal; 1834–1853 with Ferdinand II (1837–1853)	Succeeded by Pedro V
Brazilian royalty
New title	Princess Imperial of Brazil; 12 October 1822 – 2 December 1825	Succeeded by Pedro
New title	Princess of Grão-Pará; 2 December 1825 – 2 May 1826	Vacant Title next held by Pedro de Alcântara
Preceded by Pedro	Princess Imperial of Brazil; 7 April 1831 – 30 October 1835	Succeeded by Januária
Portuguese royalty
Preceded by Pedro	Duchess of Braganza; 12 October 1822 – 2 May 1826	Vacant Title next held by Pedro
New title	Duchess of Porto; 4 April 1833 – 31 October 1838	Succeeded by Luís
