= Necessidades Palace =

Coordinates: 38°42′25″N 9°10′11″W

- Palácio das Necessidades (Portuguese)
- Necessidades Palace

- Location within Portugal
- Location: Estrela, Lisbon, Portugal

Site notes
- Architectural style: Baroque

Portuguese National Monument
- Official name: Palácio das Necessidades
- Type: Property of Interest

The Necessidades Palace (Portuguese: Palácio das Necessidades) is a historic building in the Largo do Rilvas, a public square in Lisbon, Portugal. It serves as headquarters of the Portuguese Foreign Ministry. The palace has been classified as a Property of Public Interest since 1983.

== History ==
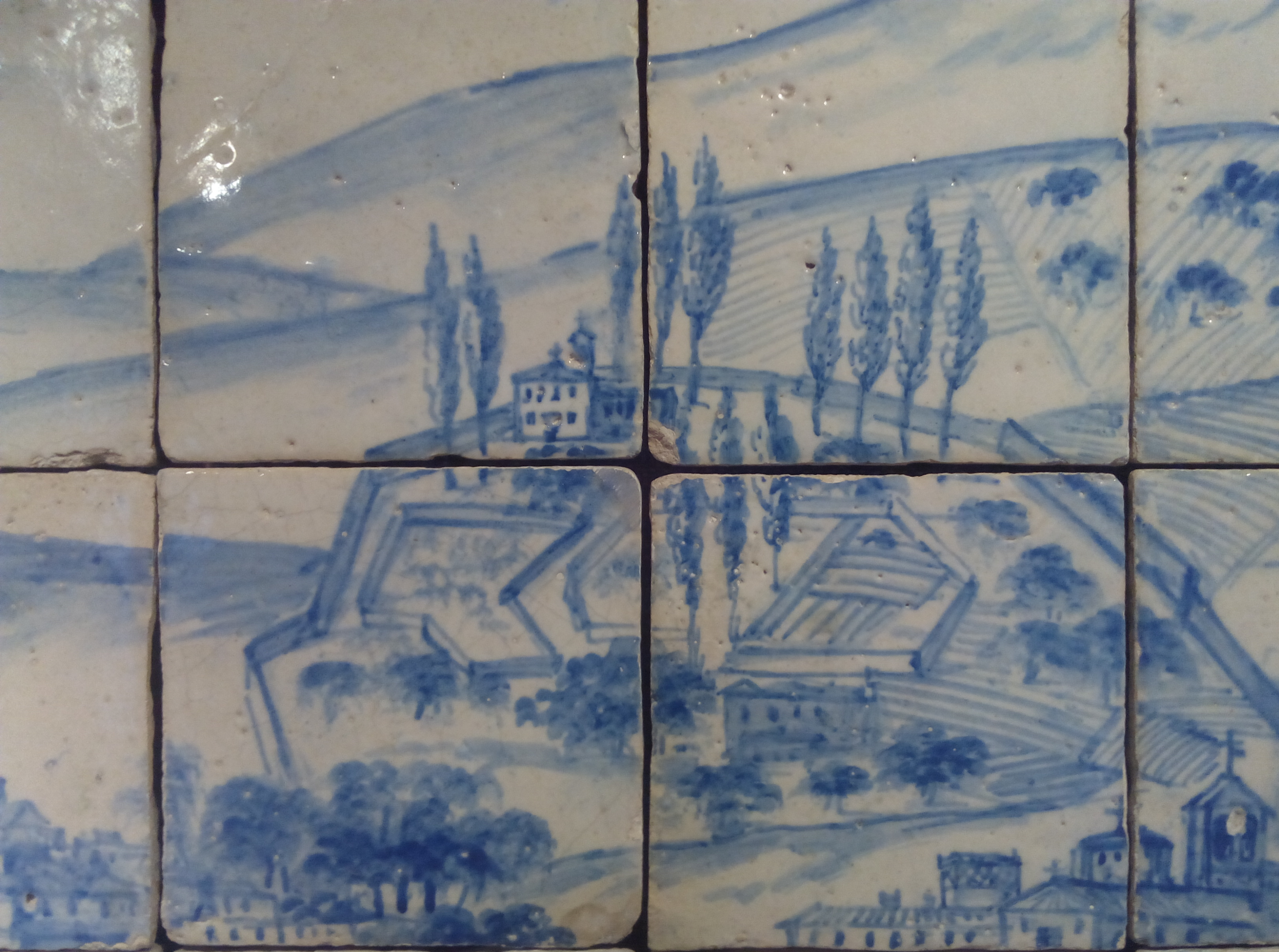
The Chapel of Our Lady of Needs, in an early 17th-century tile panel.

Formerly a convent belonging to the Congregation of the Oratory of Saint Philip Neri, it was built in the 18th century, by order of King John V, in gratitude for prayers answered by Our Lady of Needs, whose first devotional chapel stood on this site.

The palace became the residence of the kings of the House of Braganza, beginning in the reign of Maria II, and all subsequent monarchs lived there, except for her son, Luís I, who preferred to use the Palace of Ajuda. Ferdinand of Saxe-Coburg and Gotha, husband of Maria II, lived in this palace until his death, amassing a large collection of art, which would be dispersed after his death. The palace then underwent several renovations to accommodate the taste of the various monarchs who lived there, the most recent of which was carried out at the beginning of the twentieth century by Carlos I. He enlarged the state dining room because of the frequency of diplomatic activity undertaken there.

The palace was the scene of memorable events in Portuguese history, some momentous, some tragic, some slightly ridiculous. One famous example: King Peter V had installed in the front door of the palace a slot through which his subjects could, if they wished to, leave messages and complaints for the attention of the sovereign. The last significant event at the palace, which would also be the epilogue of the monarchy, was the joint funeral of King Carlos and his son, Prince Luís Filipe, on 1 February 1908, after their assassination by radical republicans. During the 5 October 1910 revolution, the palace, because it was the official residence of the king, Manuel II, was shelled by the cruiser Adamastor, one of the ships stationed in the Tagus River. The salvoes caused some damage to the palace, and one of the bomblets even reached the king's private quarters on the first floor, but he had taken refuge elsewhere on the palace grounds. Thanks to the quick thinking of an employee of the building, who cut down the flagpole that customarily displayed the royal banner whenever the monarch was in residence, the Republicans were led to believe that Manuel II had abandoned his home. The king did indeed leave Lisbon a few hours later, and he took refuge in the Palace of Mafra, 28 kilometres northwest of the capital.

Many works of art housed in the palace were the private property of Manuel II and followed him to his residence in exile in London.

== Ministry of Foreign Affairs ==
After the proclamation of the republic on 5 October 1910, the palace remained unoccupied for almost 40 years. In around 1950 it became the headquarters of the Portuguese Ministry of Foreign Affairs, a function that continues until the present day. Most of the royal collections, of art, furnishings and other bric-a-bracs were transferred to the museum of the Palace of Ajuda.

Just as the word Whitehall is a convenient way of referring to the British government, today, any use of the word Necessidades is a shorthand way of speaking of the Portuguese foreign ministry or the foreign policy of Portugal, in general.

== See also ==
- List of Baroque residences
- Lisbon regicide

== Gallery ==
Southeast-facing façade of Necessidades Palace

Chafariz das Necessidades and its obelisk

Sculptural detail of Chafariz das Necessidades

Domed greenhouse in Tapada das Necessidades

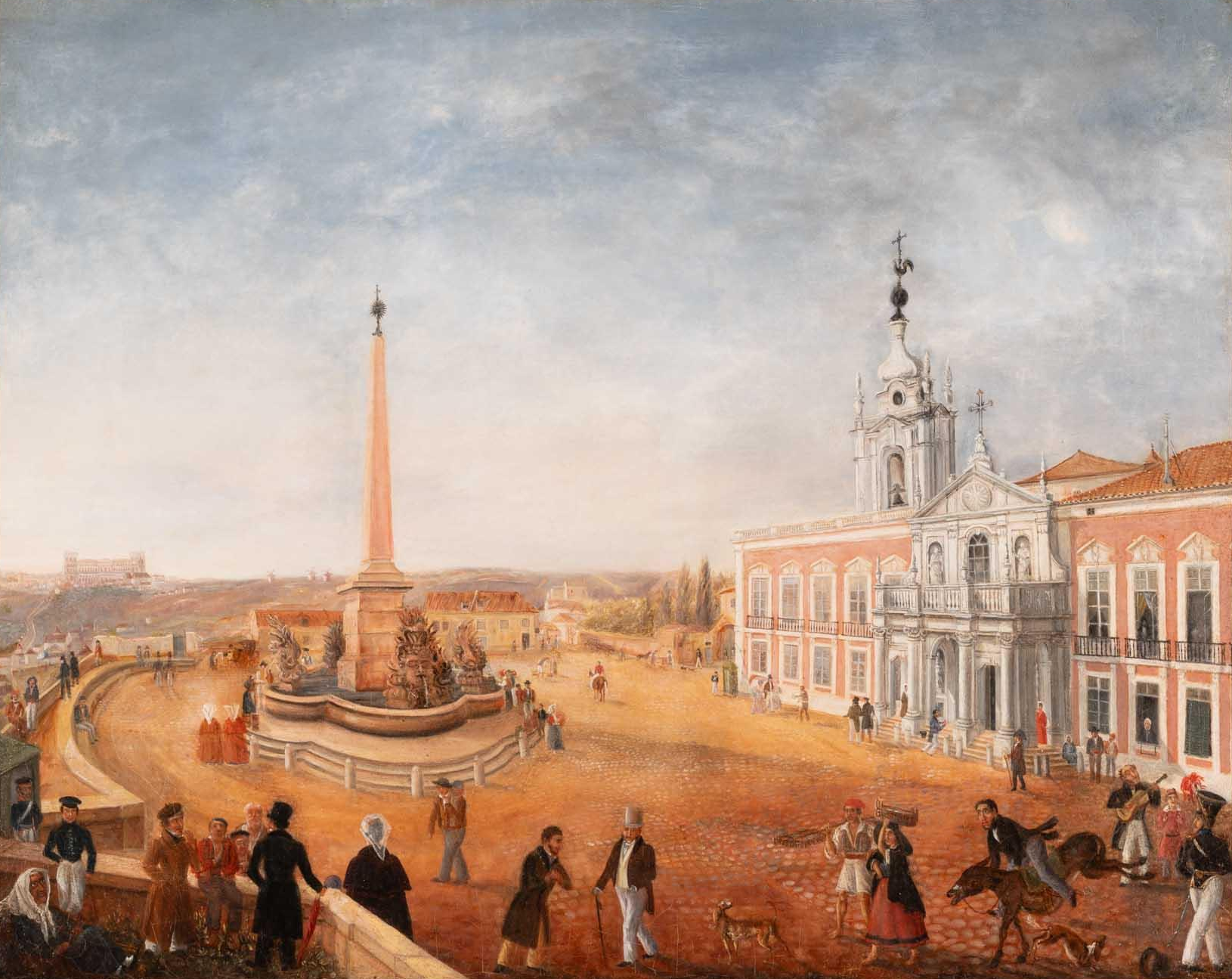
Necessidades Palace and square around 1834
