= Infante Fernando of Portugal =

Portuguese infante (1846–1861)

Infante Fernando
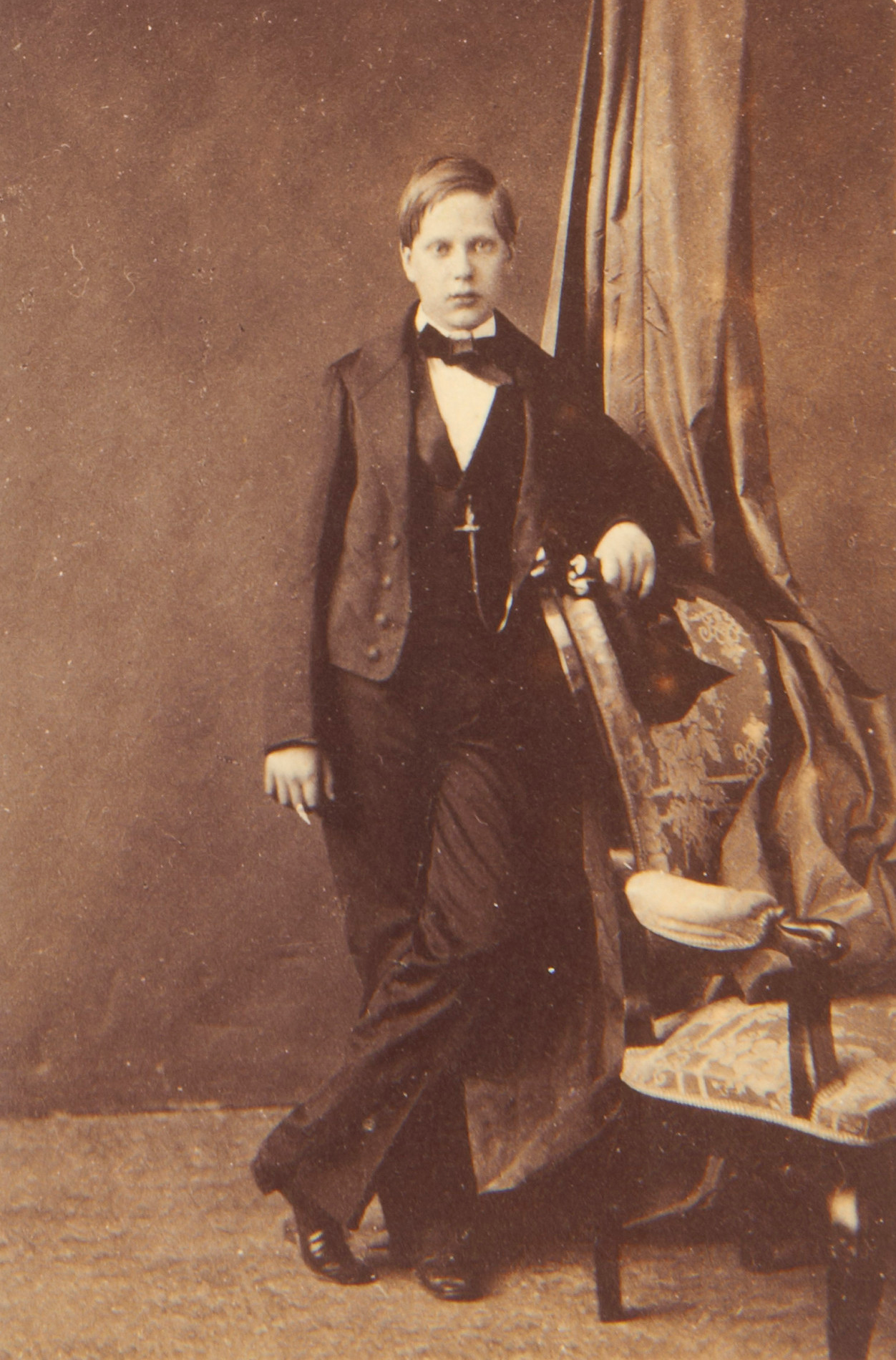
- Portrait, 1861
- Born: 23 July 1846; Lisbon, Kingdom of Portugal
- Died: 6 November 1861 (aged 15); Lisbon, Kingdom of Portugal
- Burial: Royal Pantheon of the Braganza Dynasty
Names
- Fernando Maria Luís
- House: House of Braganza
- Father: Ferdinand of Saxe-Coburg and Gotha
- Mother: Maria II of Portugal

Infante Fernando of Portugal (Fernando Maria Luís de Saxe-Coburgo-Gotha e Bragança; 23 July 1846 – 6 November 1861) was the fourth son of Queen Maria II of Portugal and King-consort Fernando II and a member of the House of Braganza. (Note: "While remaining patrilineal dynasts of the duchy of Saxe-Coburg and Gotha according to pp. 88, 116 of the 1944 Almanach de Gotha, Title 1, Chapter 1, Article 5 of the 1838 Portuguese constitution declared, with respect to Ferdinand II of Portugal's issue by his first wife, that 'the Most Serene House of Braganza is the reigning house of Portugal and continues through the Person of the Lady Queen Maria II'. Thus their mutual descendants constitute the Coburg line of the House of Braganza")

== Life ==
Fernando was born in Lisbon on 23 July 1846. He was a lieutenant in the Fifth Battalion of Caçadores, and received the Grand Cross of the Order of Our Lady of the Conception of Vila Viçosa. Along with two of his brothers, King Pedro V and Infante João, Duke of Beja, Fernando died of typhoid fever or cholera in late 1861. He was buried in the Royal Pantheon of the Braganza Dynasty.

== Ancestry ==
Ancestors of Infante Fernando of Portugal

8. Francis, Duke of Saxe-Coburg-Saalfeld
4. Prince Ferdinand of Saxe-Coburg and Gotha
9. Countess Augusta Reuss of Ebersdorf
2. Fernando II of Portugal
10. Ferenc József, Prince Koháry de Csábrág et Szitnya
5. Princess Mária Antónia Koháry de Csábrág et Szitnya
11. Countess Maria Antonia von Waldstein zu Wartenberg
1. Infante Fernando of Portugal
12. João VI of Portugal
6. Pedro I of Brazil and IV of Portugal
13. Infanta Carlota Joaquina of Spain
3. Maria II of Portugal
14. Francis II, Holy Roman Emperor
7. Archduchess Leopoldina of Austria
15. Princess Maria Theresa of Naples and Sicily
