= House of Saxe-Coburg and Gotha-Koháry =

Royal House of Bulgaria from 1887 to 1946

- Parent house: Saxe-Coburg and Gotha (agnatic); Koháry (enatic)
- Country: Saxe-Coburg and Gotha; Kingdom of Hungary; Austrian Empire; German Confederation; Austria-Hungary; North German Confederation; German Empire; Kingdom of Bulgaria
- Founded: 1826; 200 years ago
- Founder: Prince Ferdinand and Princess Maria Antonia
- Current head: Princess Marie Louise of Bulgaria
- Final ruler: until abolition of fideicommiss Prince Philipp; Present family head Princess Marie Louise of Bulgaria
- Titles: List: Prince of Saxe-Coburg and Gotha-Koháry; Duke of Saxony; Duke of Saxe-Coburg and Gotha-Koháry; Prince of Brazil; King of Portugal and the Algarves (1837–1910); Prince of Bulgaria (1887–1908); Tsar of Bulgaria (1908–1946)
- Cadet branches: Braganza-Saxe-Coburg and Gotha; Bulgarian royal family; Saxe-Coburg and Braganza branch

The House of Saxe-Coburg and Gotha-Koháry is the Catholic cadet branch of the House of Saxe-Coburg and Gotha, founded after the marriage of Prince Ferdinand of Saxe-Coburg and Gotha and Princess Maria Antonia Koháry de Csábrág.

Among its descendants were the last four kings of Portugal (Pedro V, Luís, Carlos, Manuel II) and the last three Tsars of Bulgaria (Ferdinand, Boris III, Simeon II). After the change of the “House laws” by Simeon II, the present head of the house is his sister Princess Marie Louise of Bulgaria, Princess of Koháry, and her heiress apparent is her daughter Princess Alexandra-Nadejda Kohary.

== History ==
After the marriage of Prince Ferdinand and Princess Maria Antonia in January 1816 and the death of his father-in-law, Prince Ferencz József Koháry de Csábrág, in 1826, Prince Ferdinand inherited the Hungarian princely estate of Koháry and converted to Catholicism.

The descendants of this branch married a queen-regnant of Portugal, an imperial princess of Brazil, an archduchess of Austria, a French royal princess, a royal princess of Belgium, and a royal princess of Saxony. A scion of this branch, also named Ferdinand, became ruling Prince, and then Tsar, of Bulgaria, and his descendants continued to rule there until 1946. The current head of the House of Bulgaria, the former Tsar Simeon II who was deposed and exiled after World War II, goes by the name Simeon Sakskoburggotski. He served as Bulgaria's prime minister from 2001 to 2005, which makes him one of the only two former monarchs, who have become heads of government through democratic elections. The Bulgarian director Andrey Paounov dedicated a documentary titled The Boy Who Was a King, covering the returning of Simeon II to Bulgaria, his election as prime minister and his years in government.

Prince Ferdinand and Princess Maria Antonia had four children, all of whom were raised Catholic:

1. Ferdinand (1816–1885), the husband of Queen Maria II of Portugal.
2. August (1818–1881), the father of Ferdinand of Bulgaria.
3. Victoria (1822–1857), married Louis, Duke of Nemours.
4. Leopold (1824–1884).
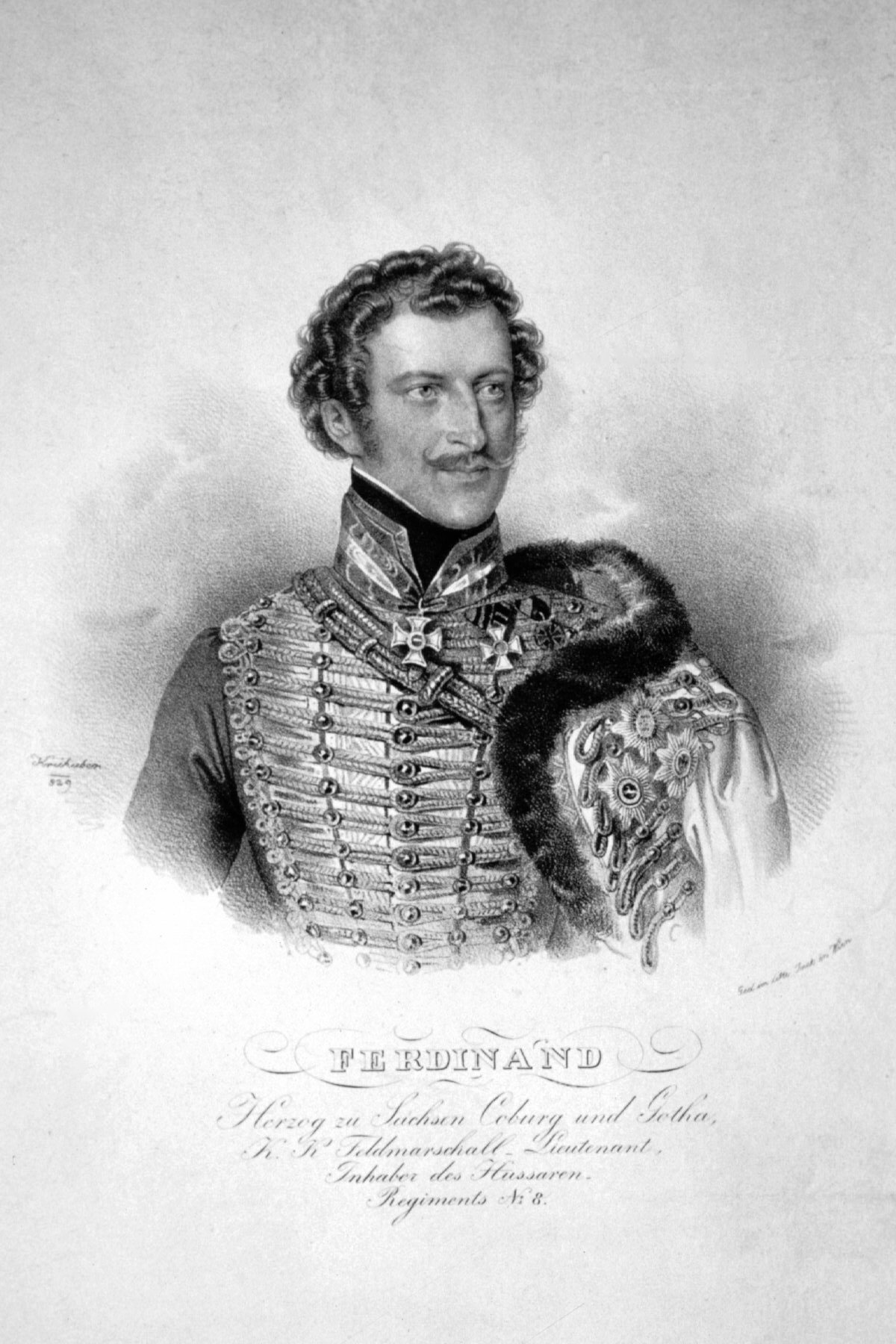
Prince Ferdinand of Saxe-Coburg and Gotha (1785–1851)

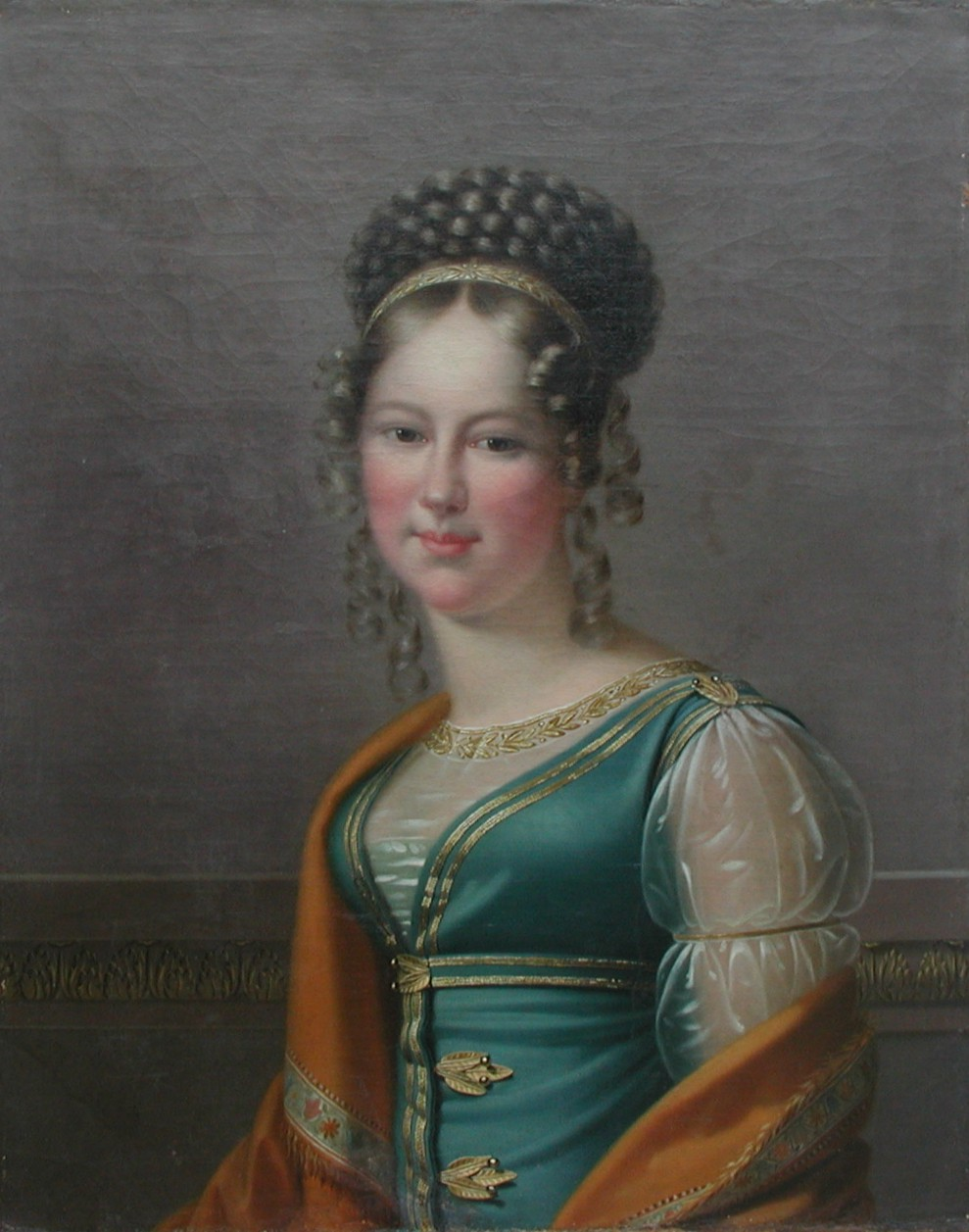
Princess Maria Antonia Koháry (1797–1862)

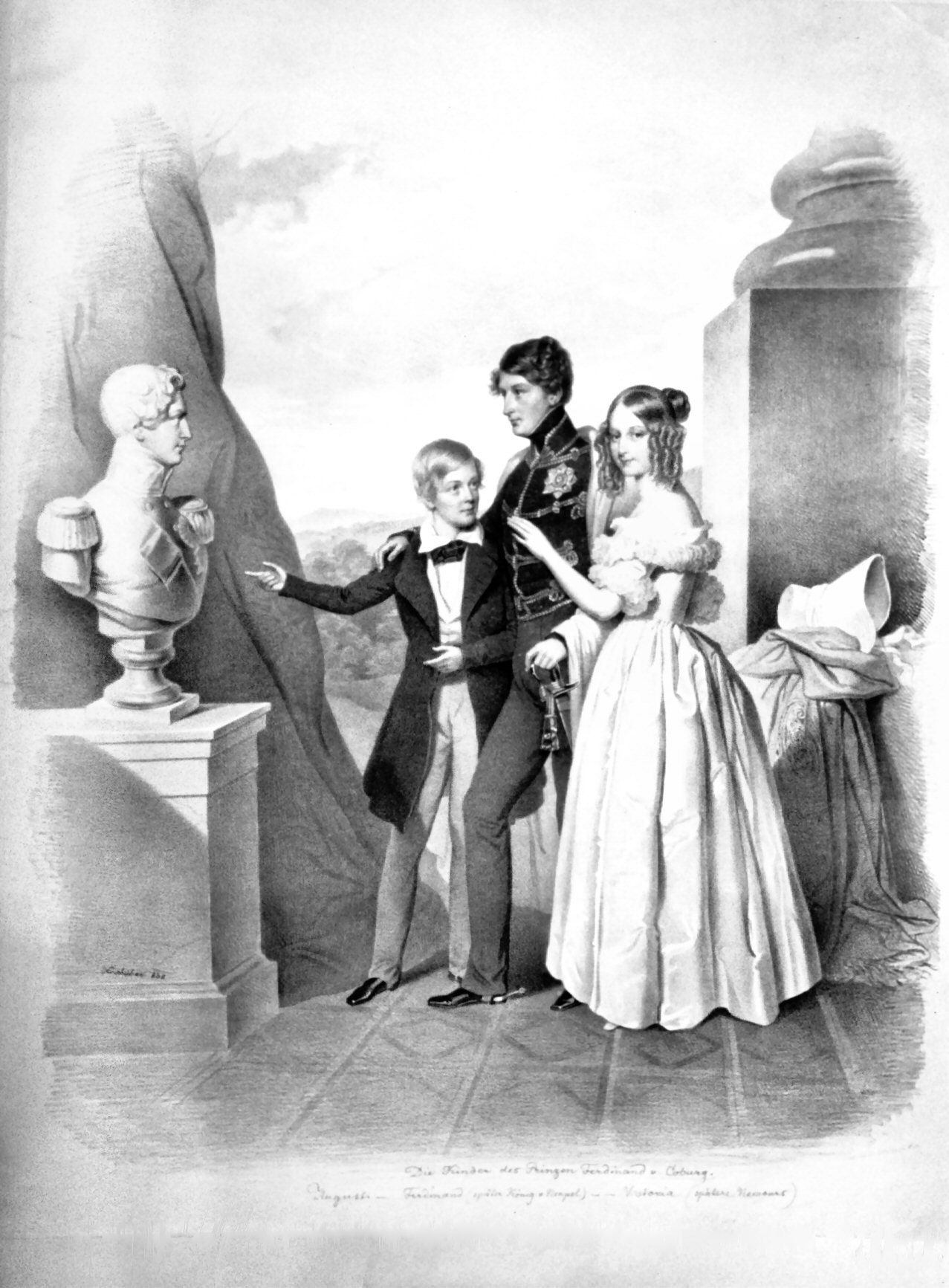
Ferdinand of Portugal, Prince August and Princess Victoria with a bust of their father, Prince Ferdinand

=== Heads of the house ===
- Prince Ferdinand (1785–1851)
  - Prince Ferdinand (1816–1885), eldest son of Prince Ferdinand; co-founder of House of Braganza-Saxe-Coburg and Gotha (line extinct in 1932)
- Prince August (1851–1881), second son of Prince Ferdinand
- Prince Philipp (1881–1921), eldest son of Prince August
  - Prince Leopold Clement (died in 1916), only son of Prince Phillipp
- Prince Pedro Augusto (1921–1934), nephew of Prince Phillipp
- Prince Rainer (1934–1945), nephew of Prince Pedro Augusto
- Prince Johannes Heinrich (1945–2010), only son of Prince Rainer
  - Prince Johannes (died in 1987), only son of Prince Johannes Heinrich
- Tsar Simeon II of Bulgaria (2010–2015), cousin of Prince Johannes Heinrich
- Princess Marie Louise of Bulgaria (2015–present), sister of Tsar Simeon II of Bulgaria

== Branches ==
=== Ducal branch ===
After the death of Prince Ferencz József Koháry, Prince Ferdinand re-organised the family fortune in two Fideicommisses and adopted the title of duke for himself and his heirs as Fideikommissherr. Upon Ferdinand's death in 1851, he was succeeded as head of the family by his second son, Prince August; his eldest son, Ferdinand the younger, had to renounce his claim to the headship when he married Queen Maria II of Portugal in 1836.

After Prince August died, his eldest son Prince Philipp (1844–1921) became the third head of the family. As Philipp's only son, Prince Leopold Clement, had died before him, he was succeeded by his grand-nephews Rainer and Philipp. The office of Fideikommissherr was abolished in 1938 after the Anschluss.

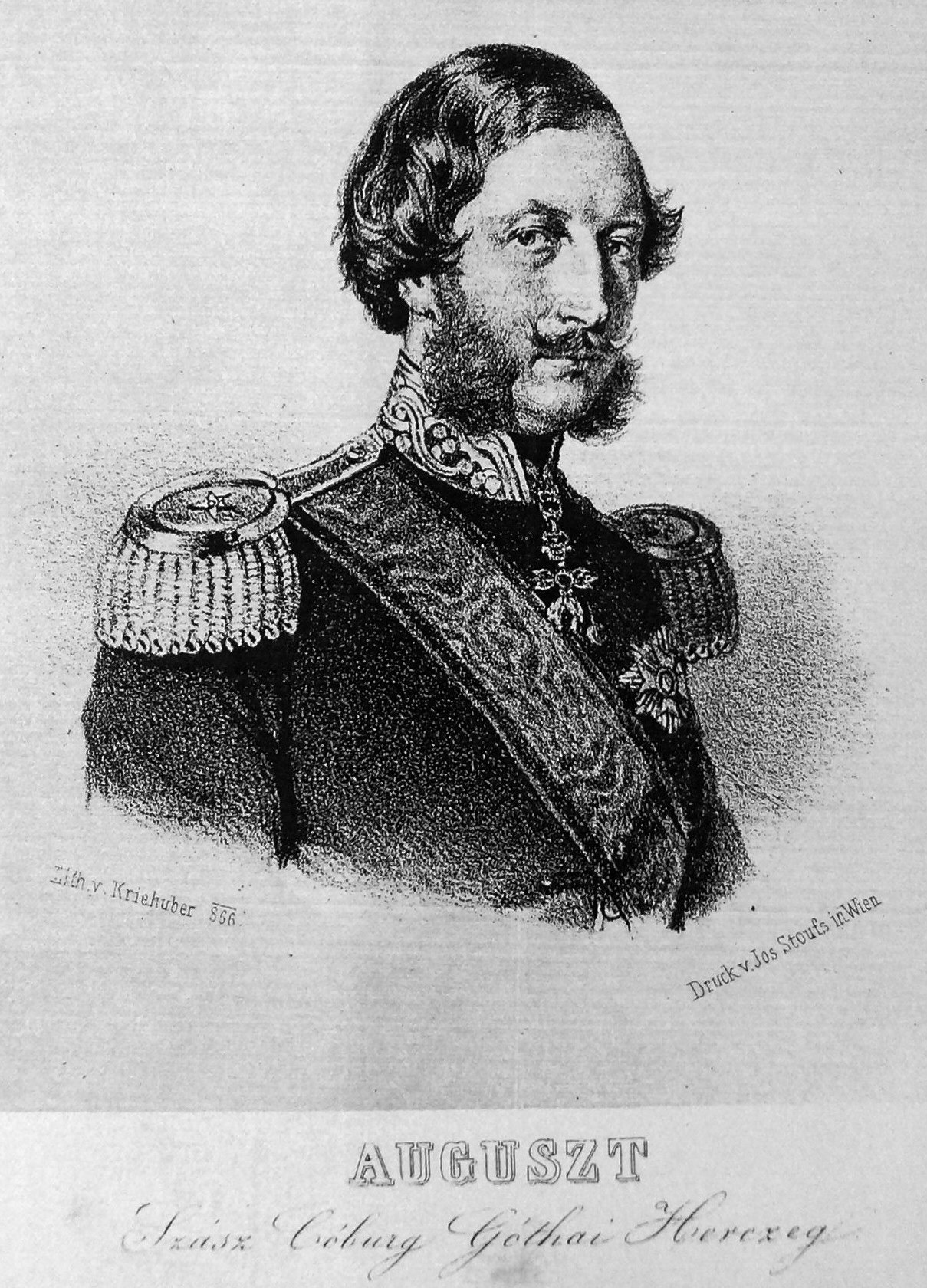
Prince August of Saxe-Coburg and Gotha (1818–1881)

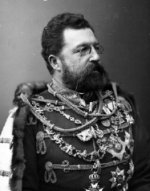
Prince Philipp of Saxe-Coburg and Gotha (1844–1921), became head of the family after the death of his father, Prince August

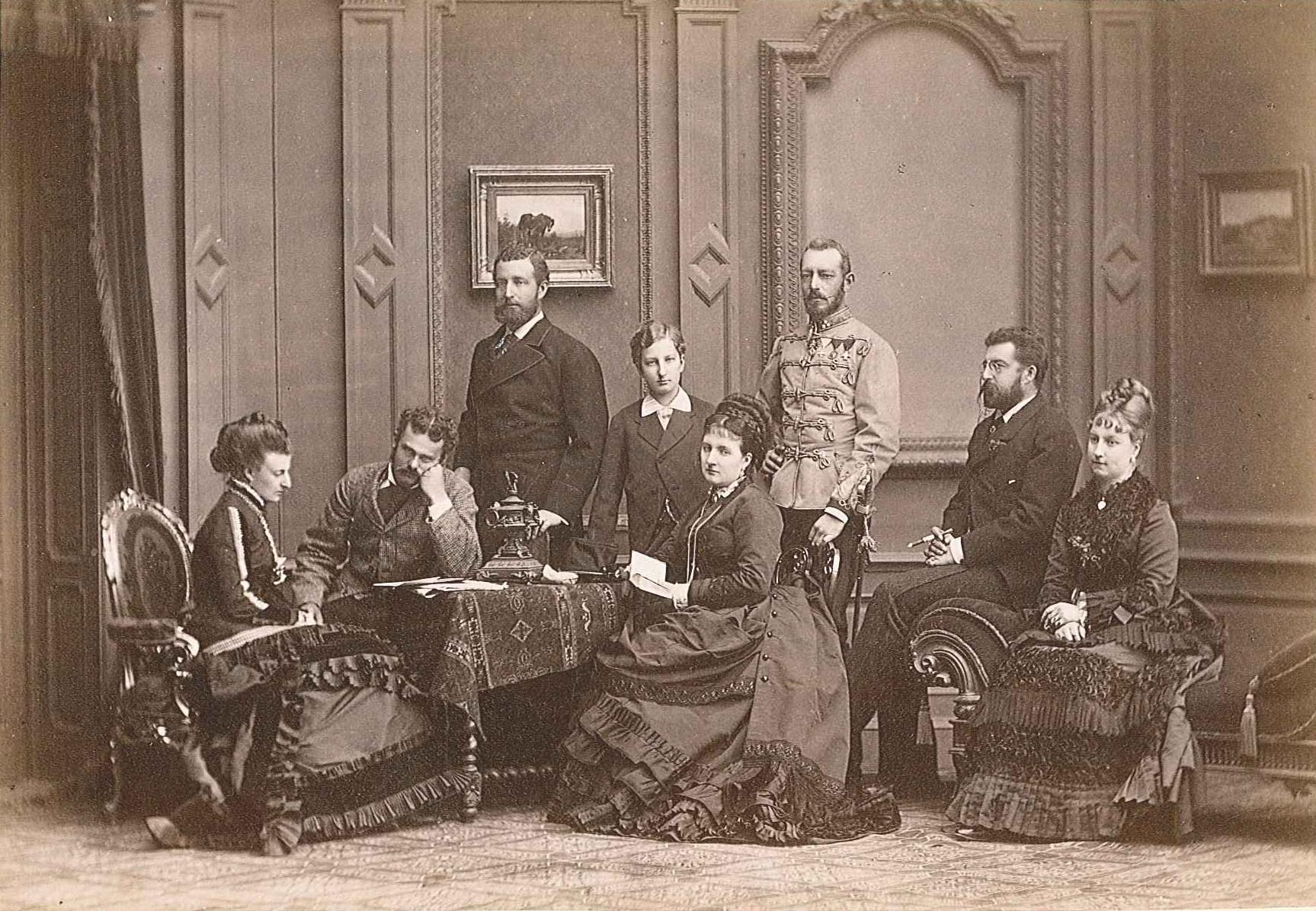
The children of Prince August

==== Brazilian line ====
This line was founded by Prince Ludwig August, second son of Prince August of Saxe-Coburg and Gotha and Princess Clémentine of Orléans, who on 15 December 1864 married in Rio de Janeiro Princess Leopoldina of Brazil. They had four sons; for a time, their two eldest sons, Princes Peter August and August Leopold, were heirs presumptive to the Brazilian throne. After the fall of the Brazilian monarchy in 1889, the family returned to Europe. Prince Rainer, who was appointed head of the house in 1921, was son of Prince August Leopold and grandson of Prince Ludwig August.

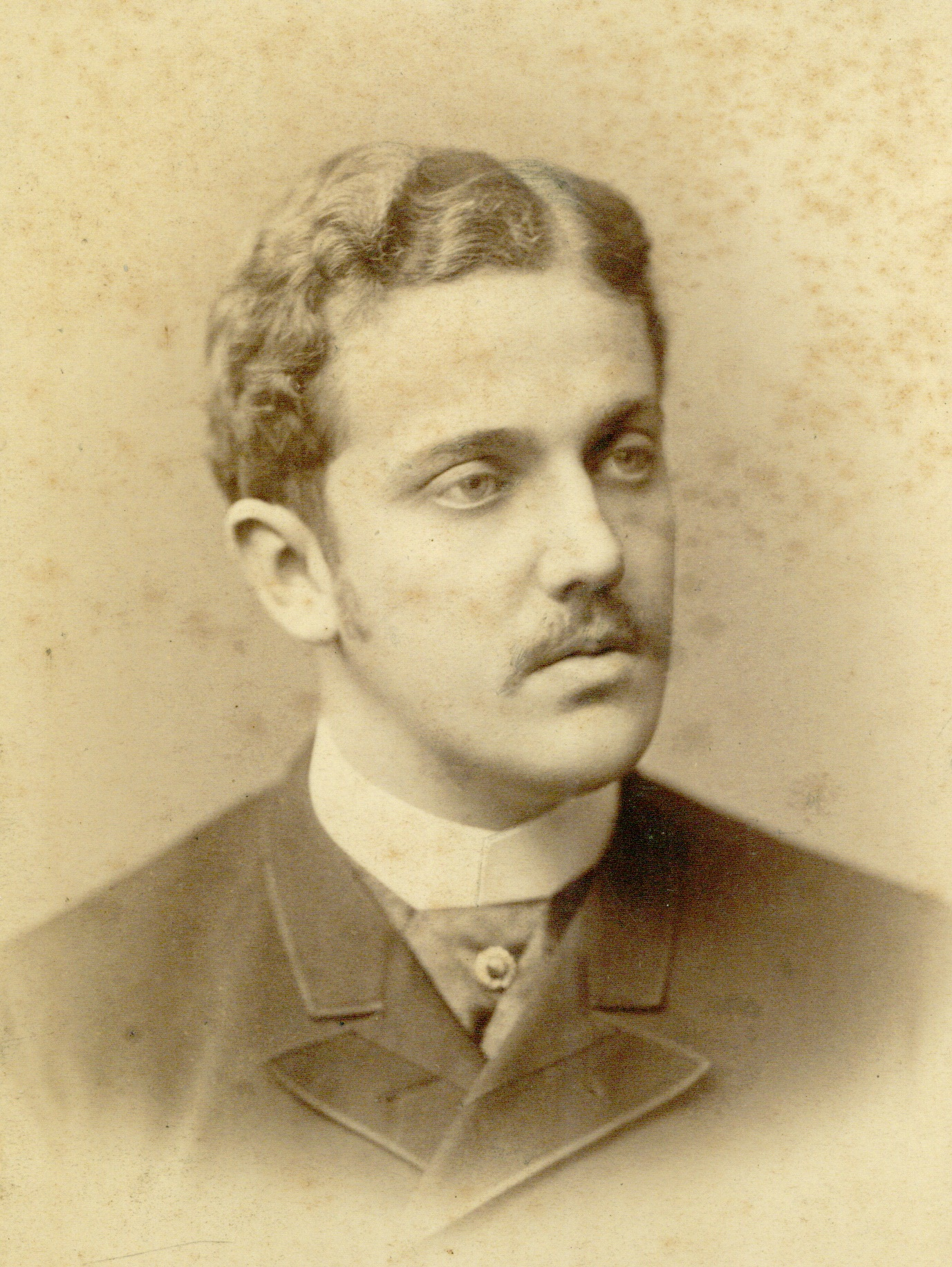
Prince Peter August (1866–1934), became head of the family after the death of his uncle, Prince Philipp

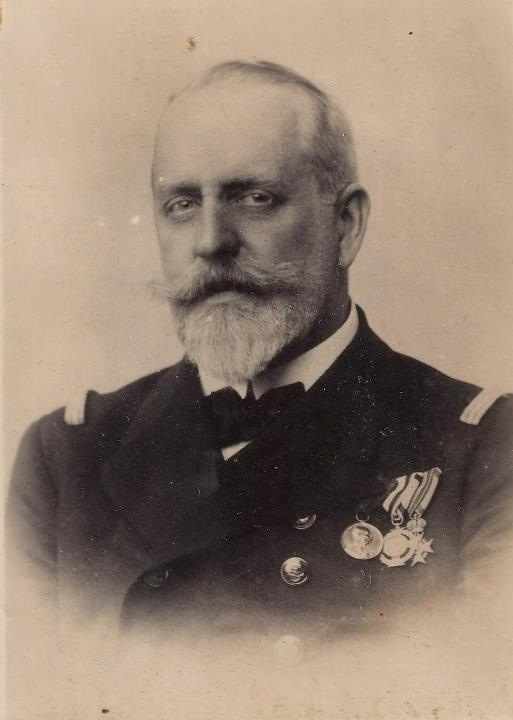
Prince August Leopold (1867–1922)

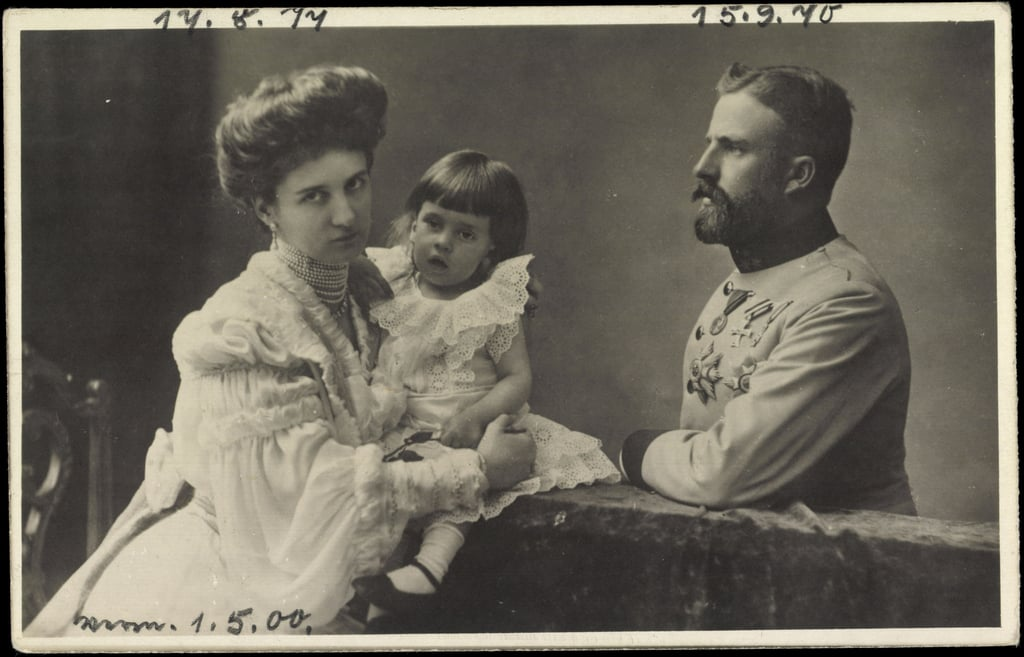
Prince Ludwig Gaston (1870–1942)

=== Portuguese branch ===
This branch was founded by the future King Fernando II of Portugal and his wife, Queen Maria II of the House of Braganza. It ruled Portugal until the deposition of King Manuel II in 1910, after which it became extinct upon his death in 1932.

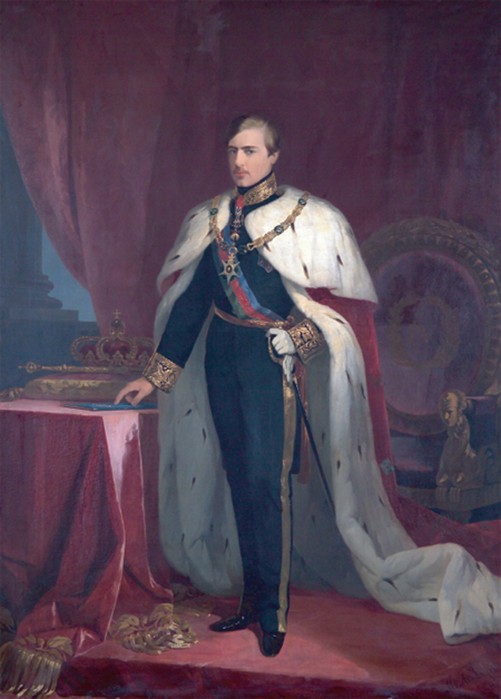
Pedro V (1837–1861)

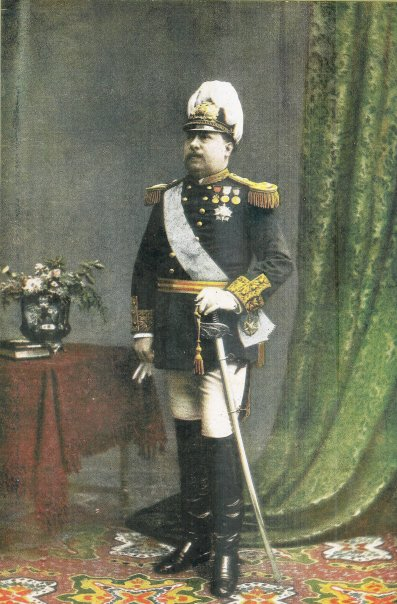
Luís (1838–1889)

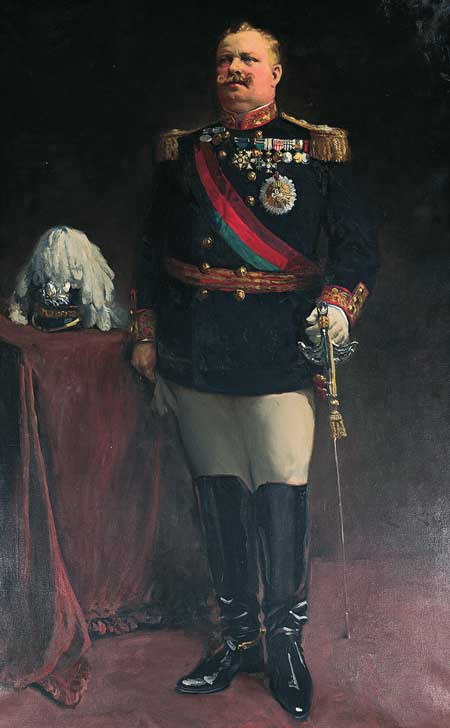
Carlos (1863–1908)

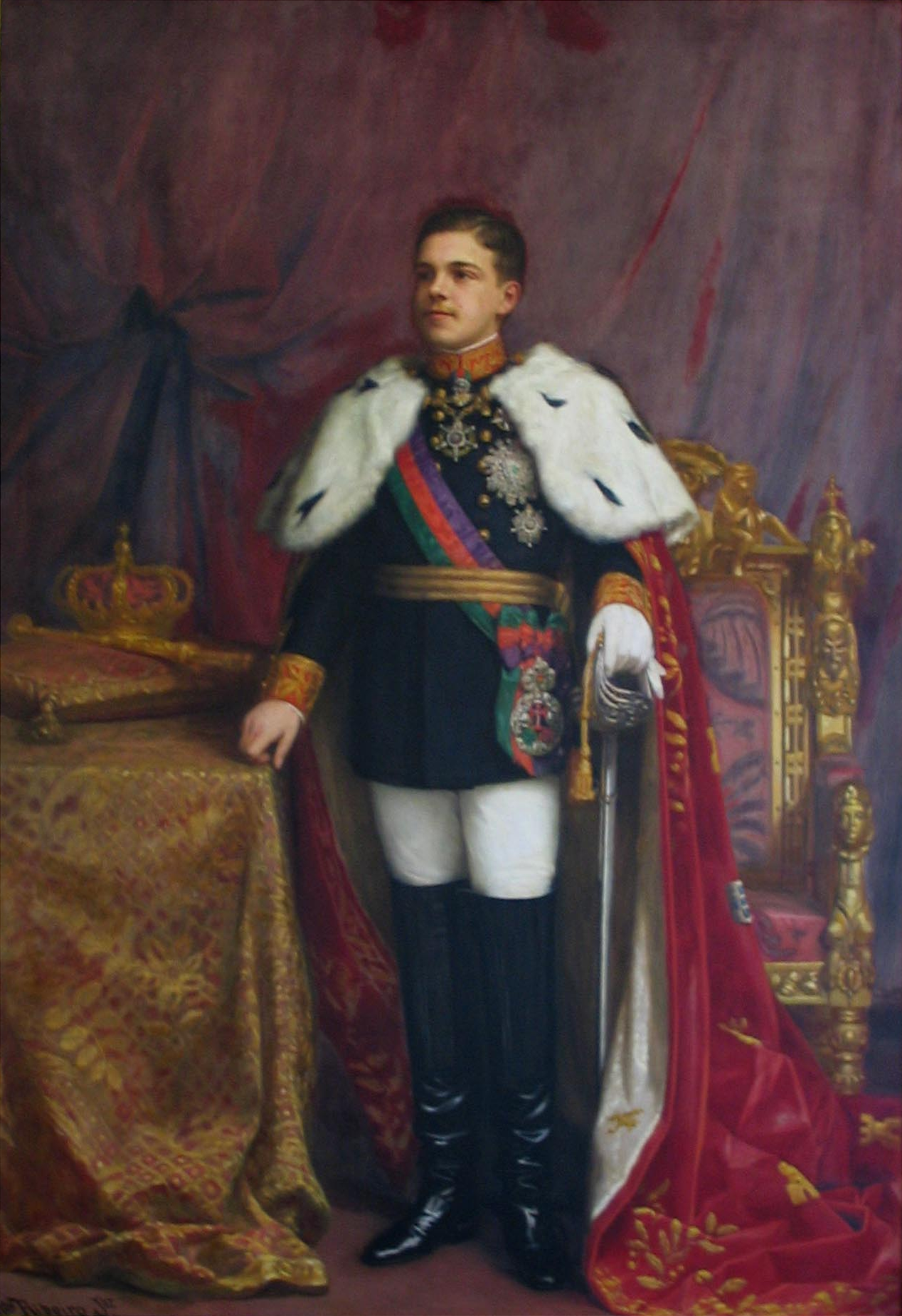
Manuel II (1889–1932)

=== Bulgarian branch ===
This branch was founded by Prince August's youngest son Ferdinand, who was elected as monarch of Bulgaria in 1887. The last Bulgarian royal family descends from him.

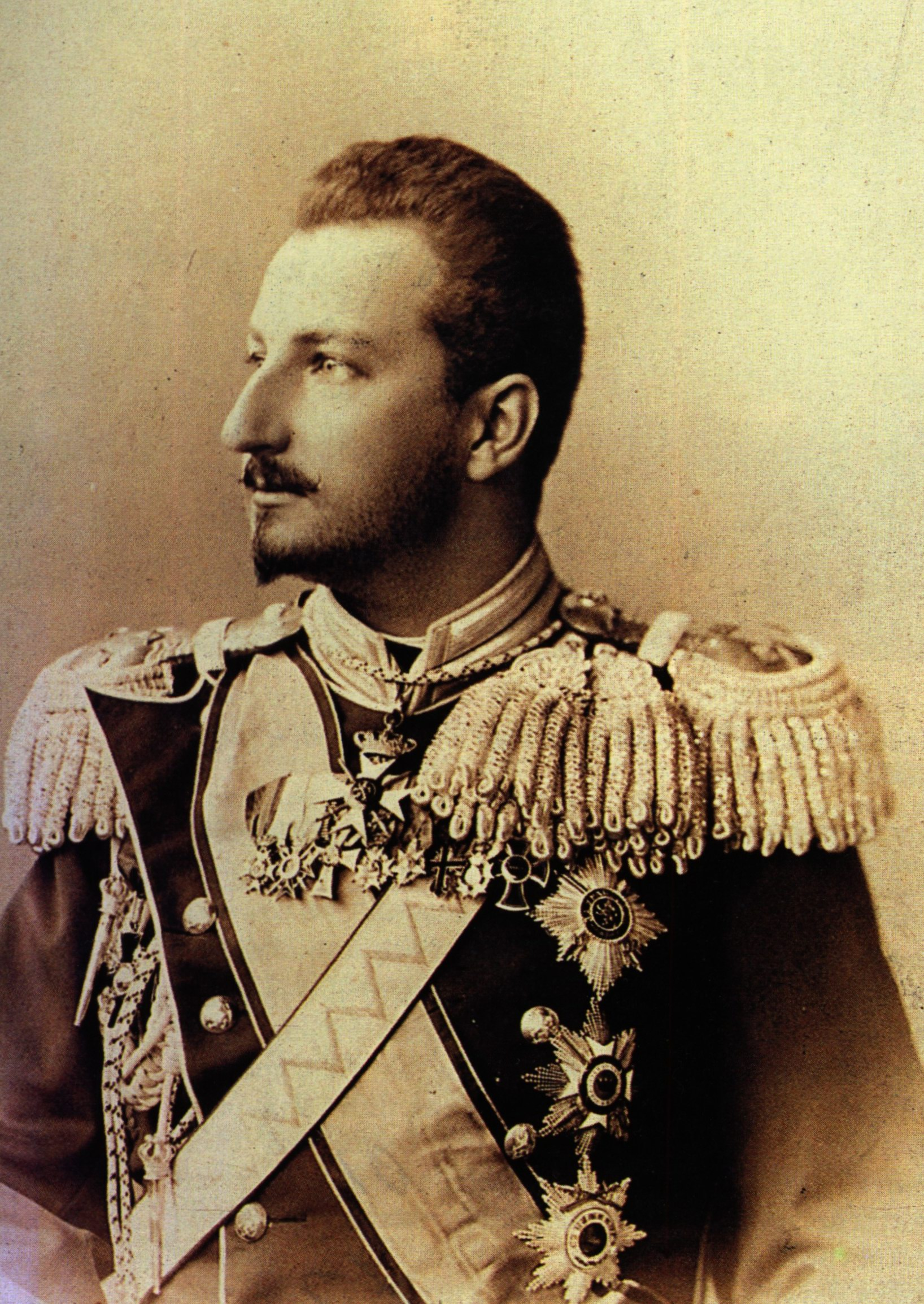
Ferdinand (1861–1948)

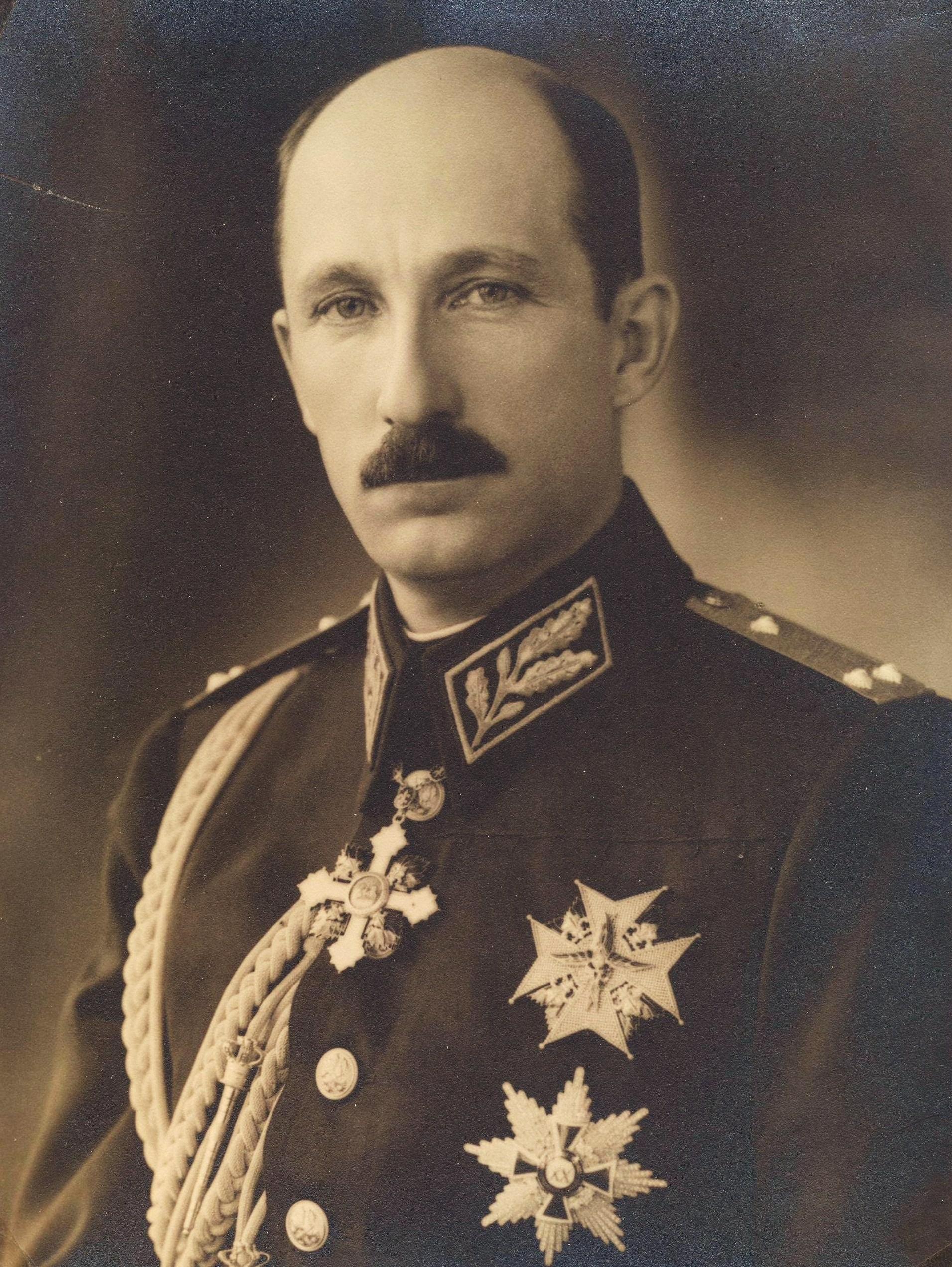
Boris III (1894–1943)

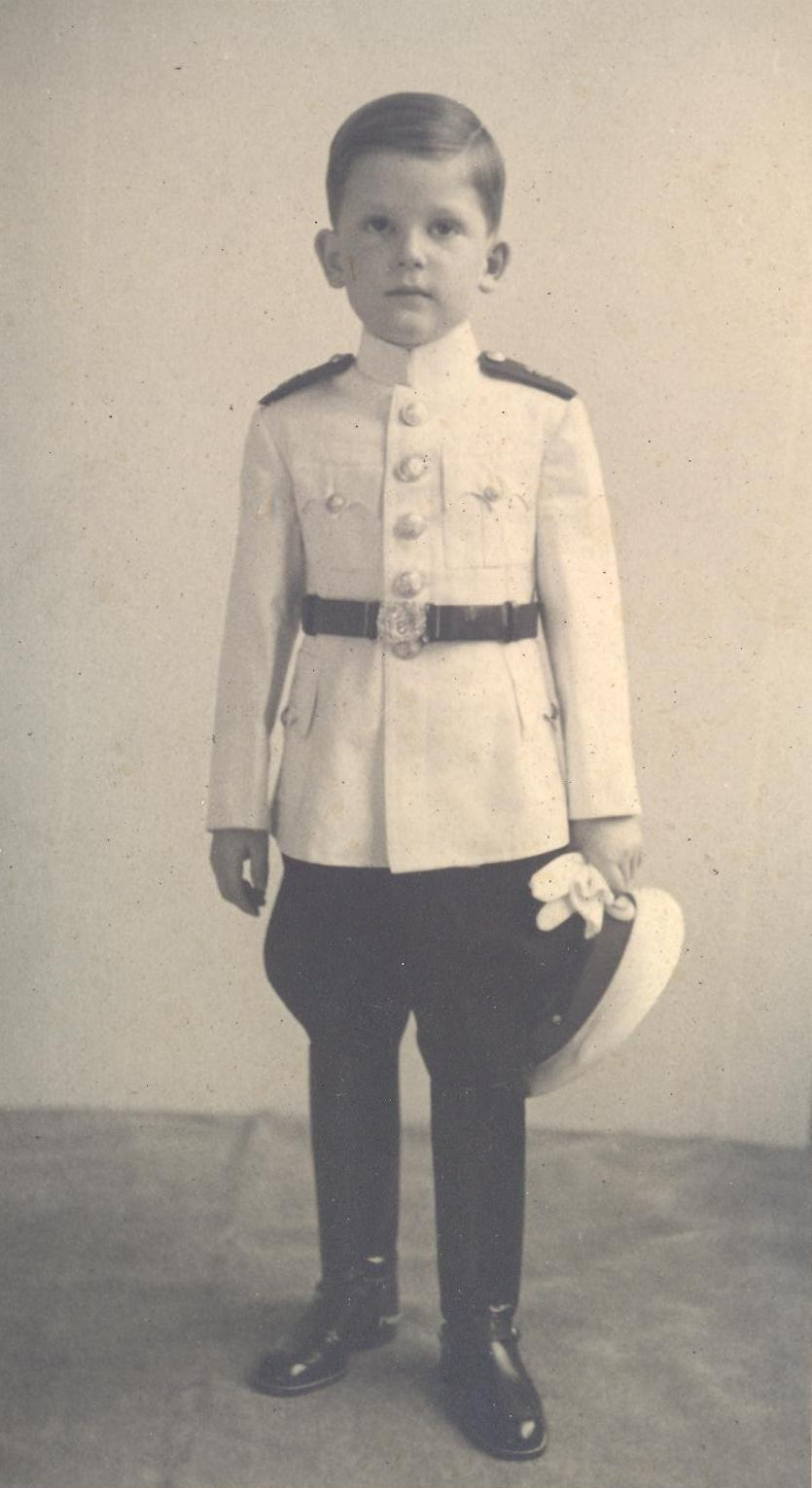
Simeon II (*1937)

== Properties and palaces ==
=== Fideicommiss ===
Princess Maria Antonia Koháry inherited over 150000 hectares of land in Lower Austria, Hungary, including estates, forests, mines and factories. According to a list of assets appended to the marriage contract of her son, Prince August, at the time of his marriage to Princess Clémentine in 1843, the Koháry properties included the enormous Palais Koháry in the center of Vienna and several Viennese manors, a summer home and lands at Ebenthal, Lower Austria, estates in Austria at Velm, Durnkrut, Walterskirchen, Bohmischdrut and Althoflein, as well as a dozen manors in Hungary, the domain of Királytia, and a mansion at Pest. As late as 1868, when Antónia's grandson Prince Ferdinand, Duke of Alencon, married, it was estimated that he and his three siblings stood to inherit a total of a million francs just from their share of their late grandmother's estate. Until the first world war, her descendants were among the three largest landowners in Hungary.

- Prinz Ferdinand Coburgsches Fideikommiss
- Gräflich Kohárysches Fideikomiss

The two fideicommisses allowed to hold the family property in foundations owned by the whole family, but governed by the head of the family alone, the Fideicommissherr. Aristocratic families had used this instrument to finance the representative household of the head of the family as well as to maintain palaces and castles, and to pay allowances to family members without personal wealth.

=== Palaces ===
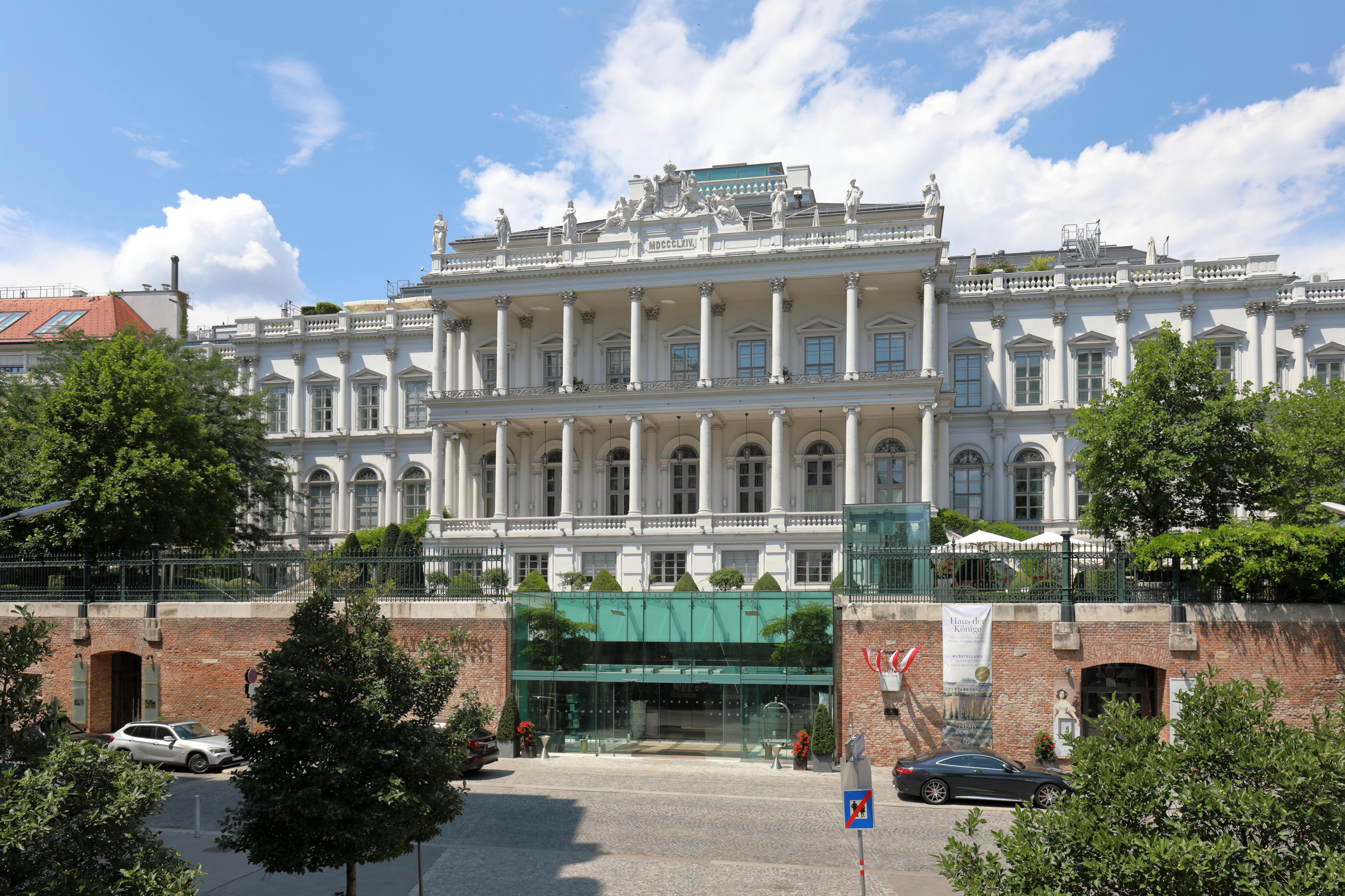
Palais Coburg in Vienna, today a hotel.

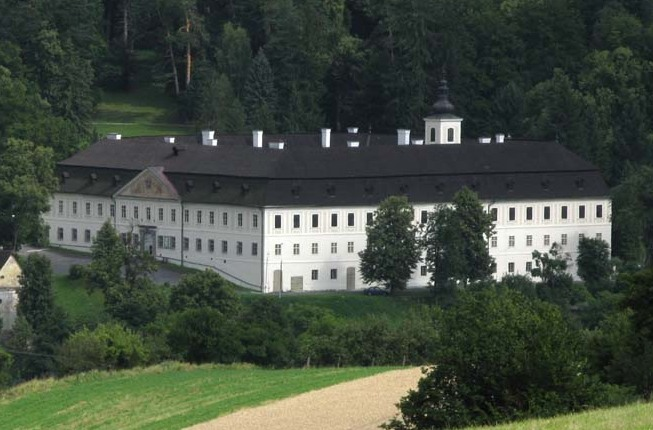
Palace of Svätý Anton in Slovakia, today a museum.

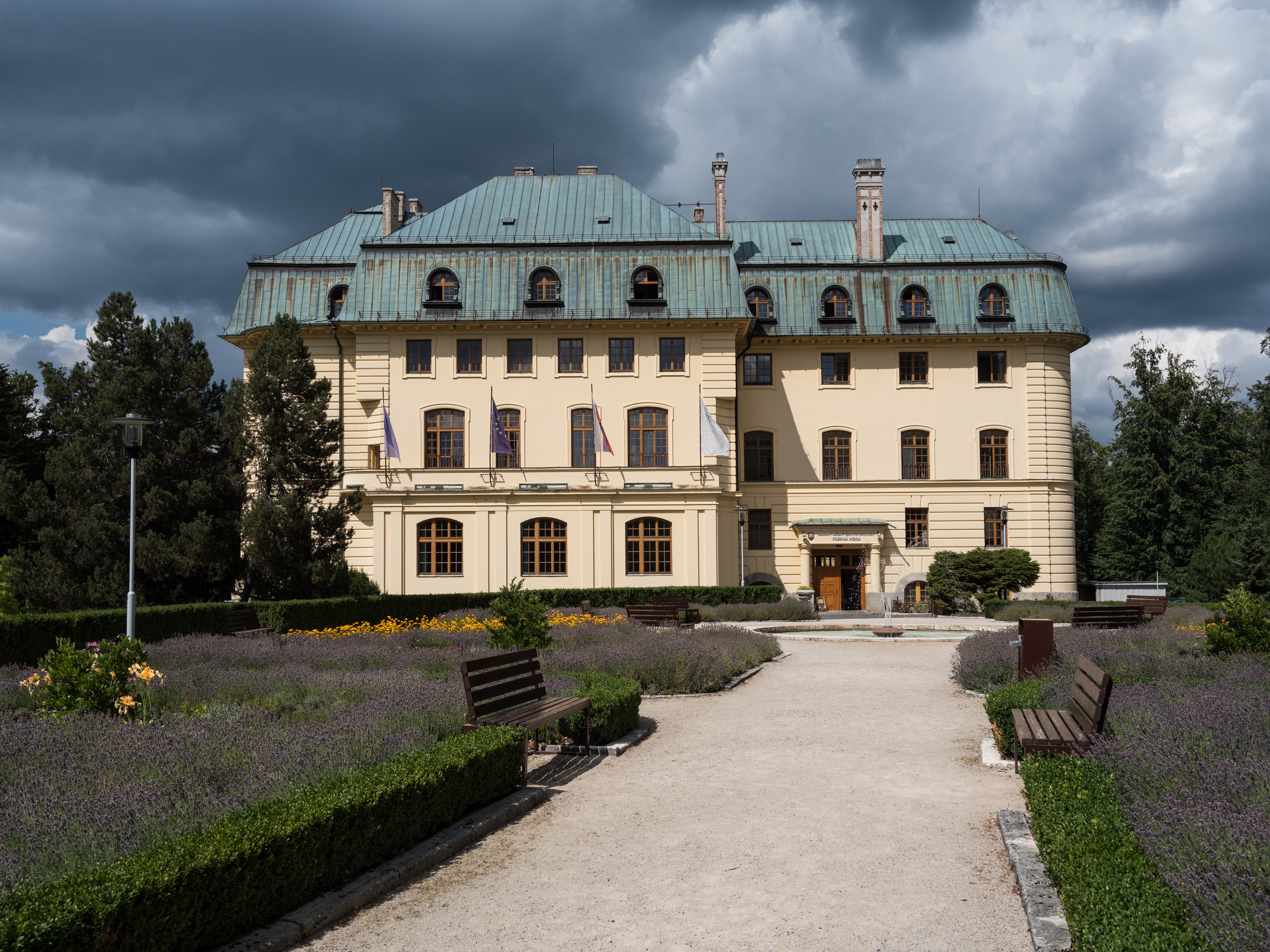
Predná Hora mansion in Slovakia, today a specialized hospital.

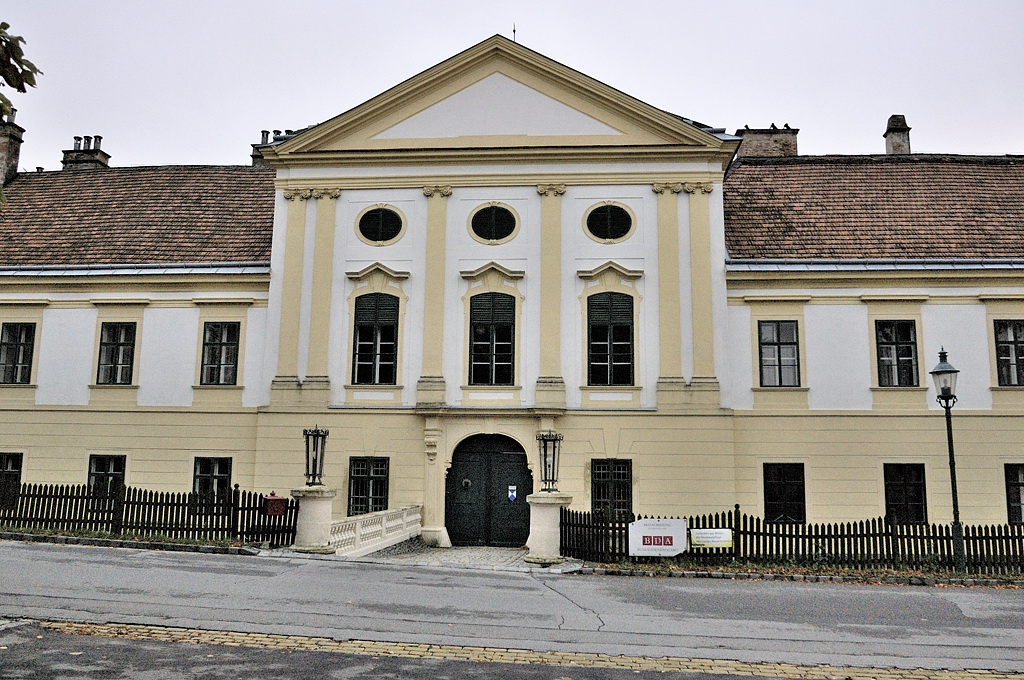
Ebenthal, Lower Austria, today private property.

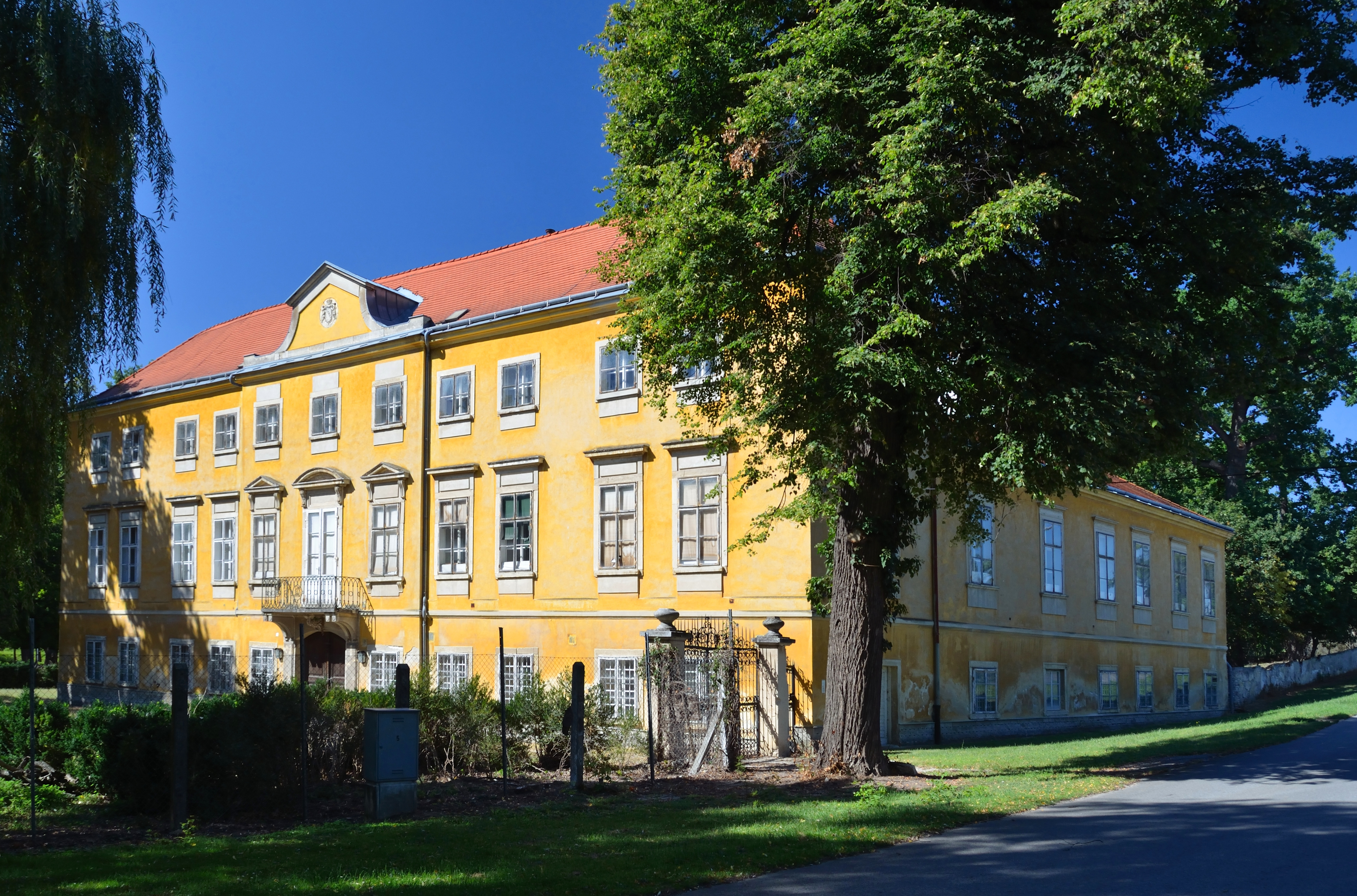
Walterskirchen castle near Poysdorf, Lower Austria, is still owned by the family.

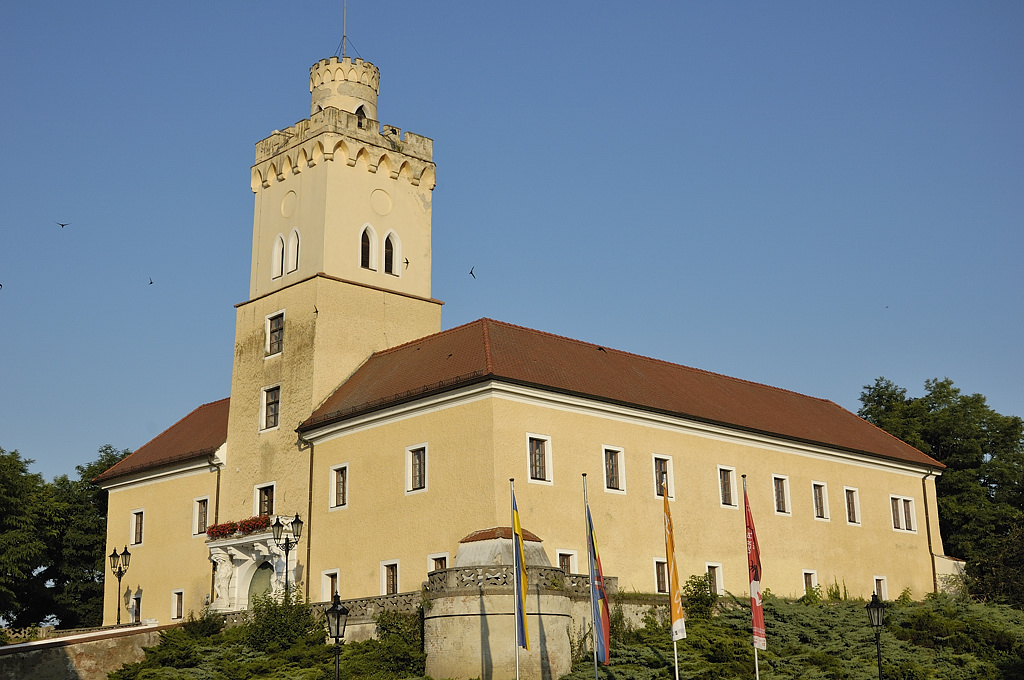
Dürnkrut, Austria, today the city hall of the municipality.

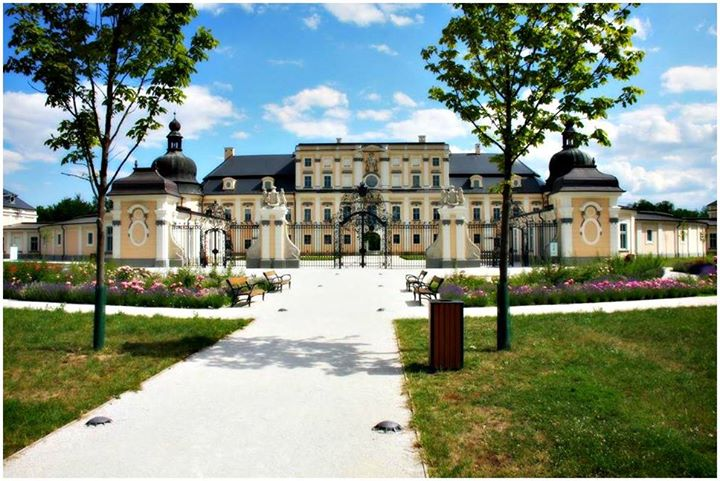
L'Huillier-Coburg Palace, acquired in 1831, today owned by the Hungarian state.

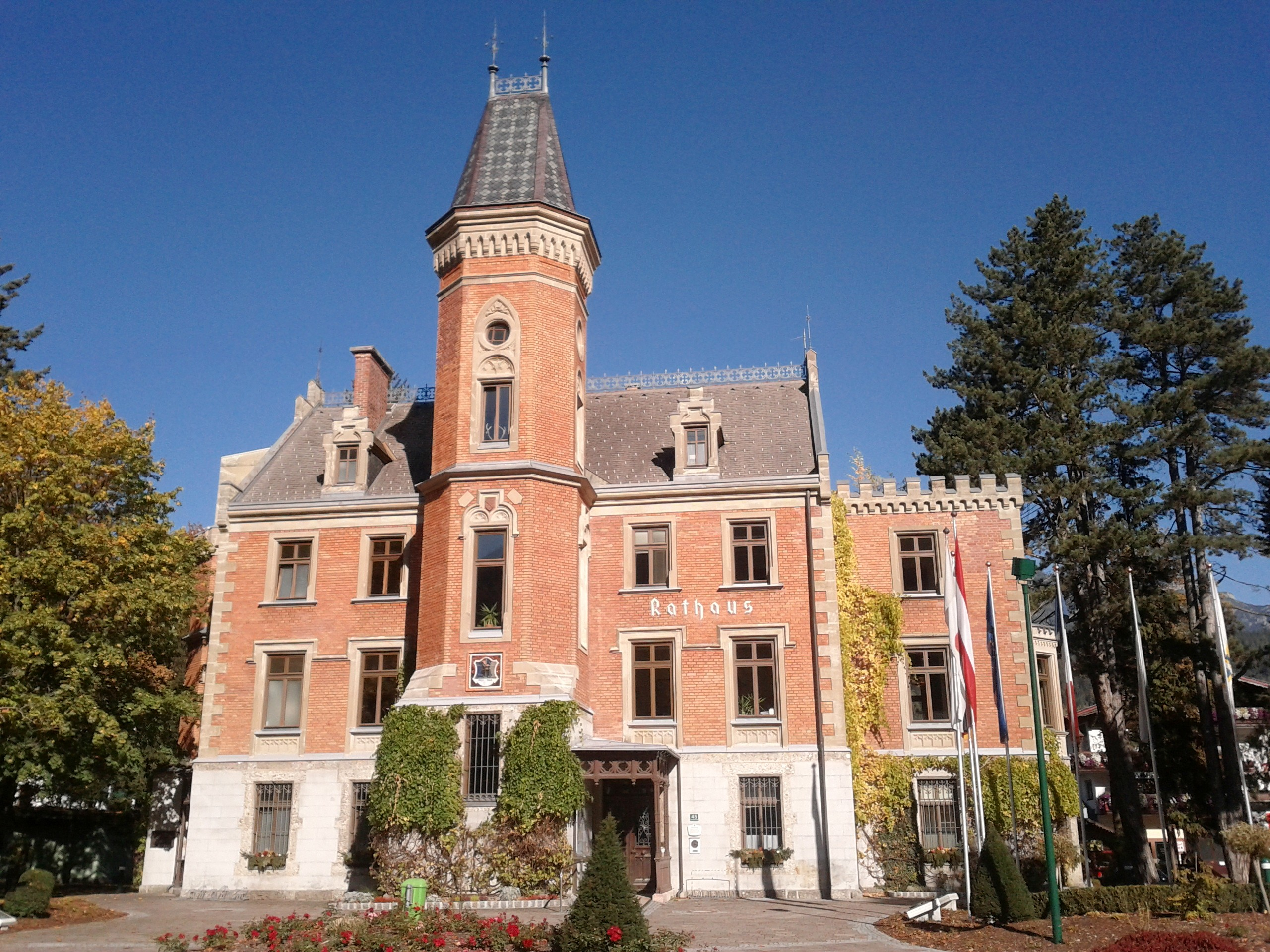
Coburg castle, Schladming, built in 1885 for Prince Ludwig August of Saxe-Coburg and Gotha, today the city hall of the municipality.

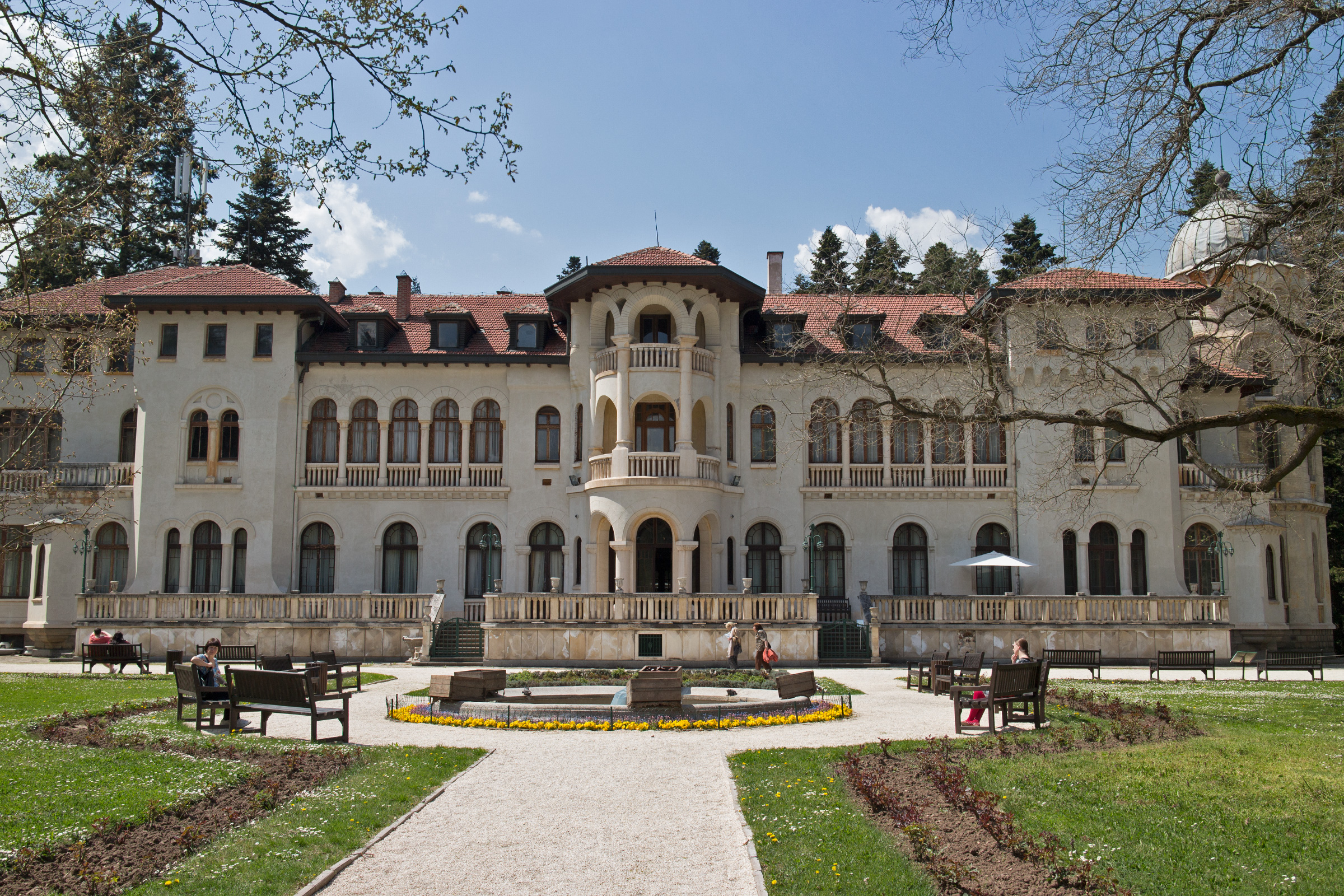
Vrana Palace in Sofia, Bulgaria. Built in the beginning of the 20th century, it is now owned by the Bulgarian royal Family and the park was donated to Sofia municipality.

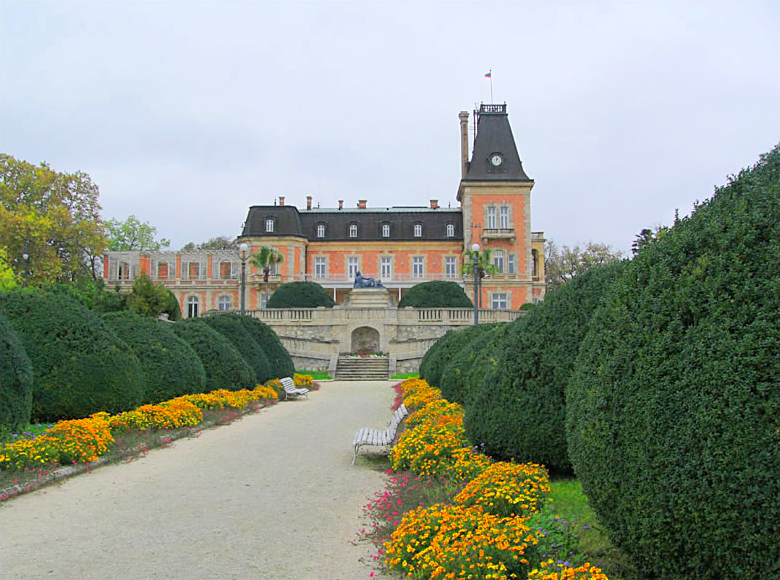
Palace of Euxinograd on the northern Black Sea coast of Bulgaria. Built between 1881–1885 as a summer residence of Ferdinand I of Bulgaria, today it is owned by the Bulgarian state.

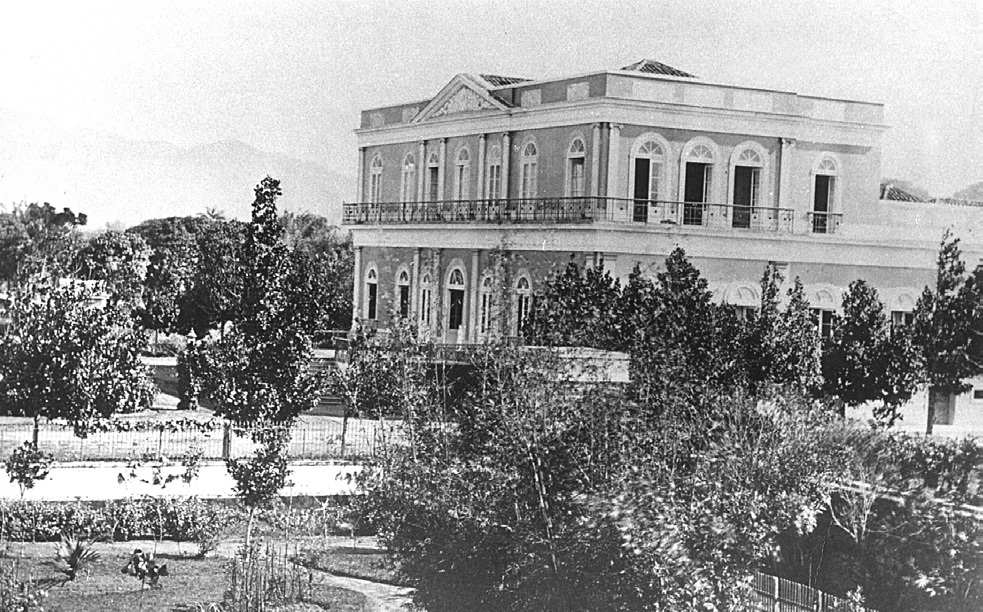
Leopoldina Palace, Rio de Janeiro. Acquired in 1865 to be residence to Princess Leopoldina of Brazil, her husband Prince Ludwig August of Saxe-Coburg and Gotha and their children. It was demolished in 1930.

== Burial site ==
In 1851, a committee headed by Prince August of Saxe-Coburg and Gotha set out to plan the construction of a Catholic church in Coburg with a burial vault underneath. St. Augustin was opened on 28 August 1860. The crypt contains the remains of fifteen members of the Koháry branch of the House of Saxe-Coburg and Gotha.

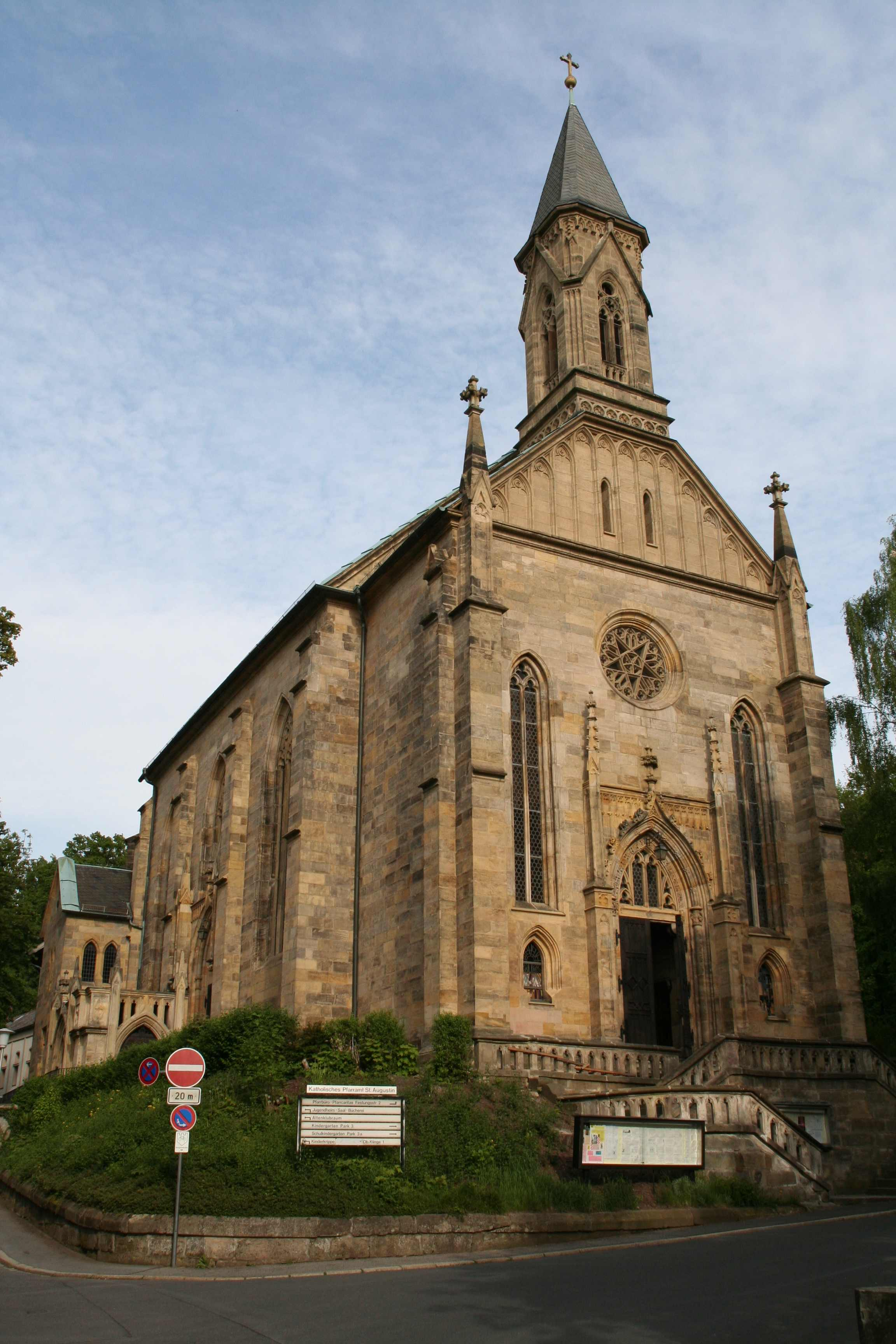
St. Augustin in Coburg

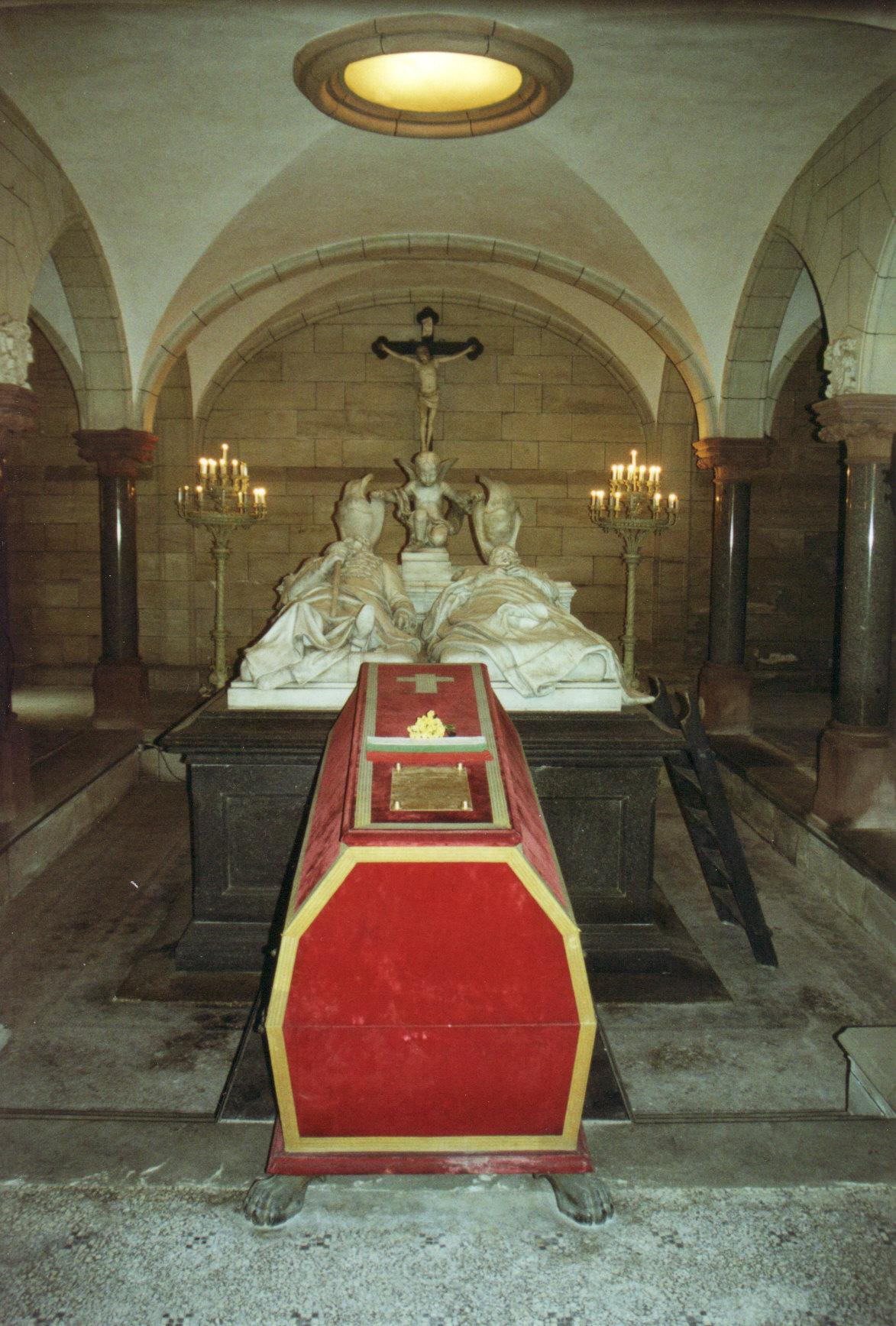
Prince August and his wife, Princess Clémentine of Orléans, are buried in a double sarcophagus, the remains of their youngest son, Tsar Ferdinand of Bulgaria, were placed at their feet.

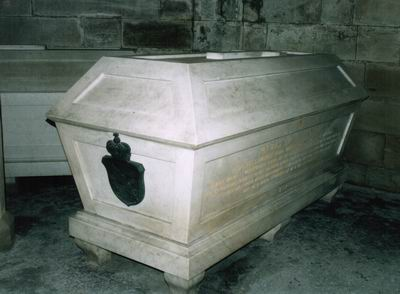
Sarcophagus of Prince Pedro Augusto of Saxe-Coburg and Gotha (1866–1934)
