= Svätý Anton manor house =

Mansion in Slovakia

Coordinates: 48.4214°N 18.9428°E

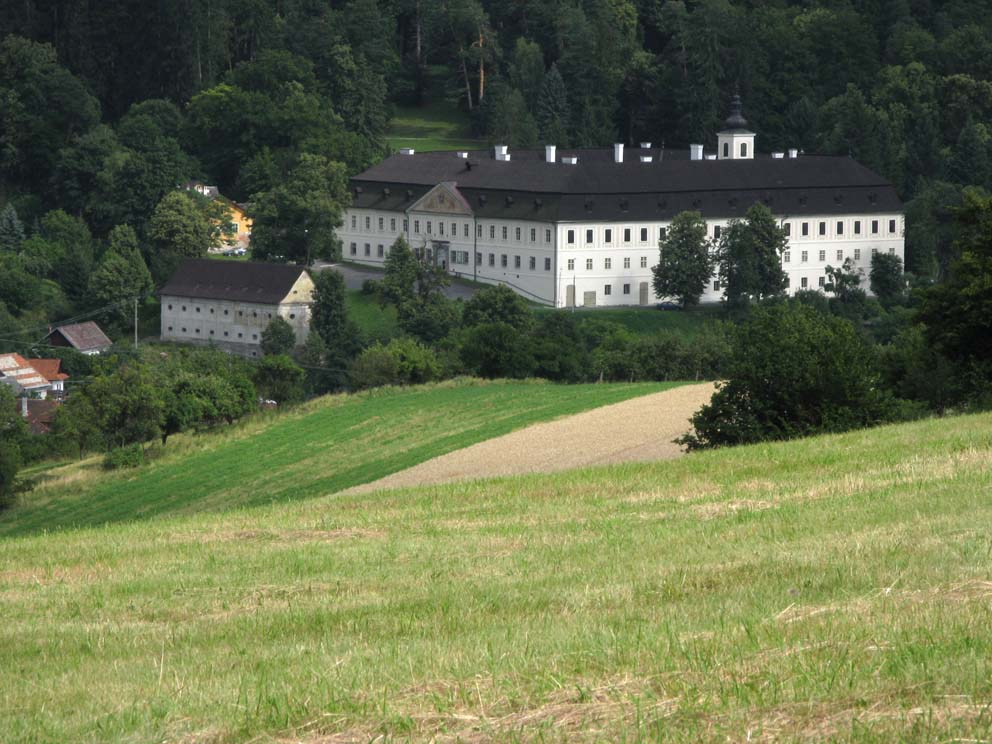
Svätý Anton Manor House from a distance

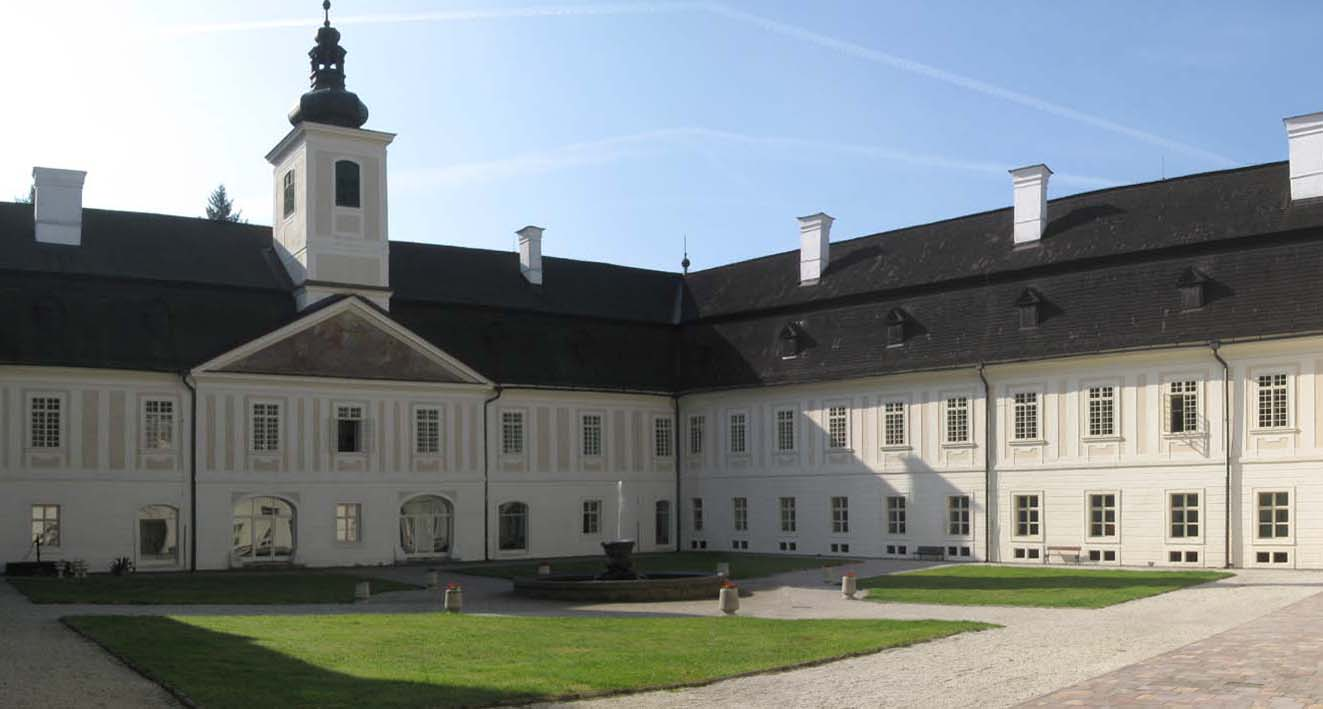
Courtyard of the manor House from a distance

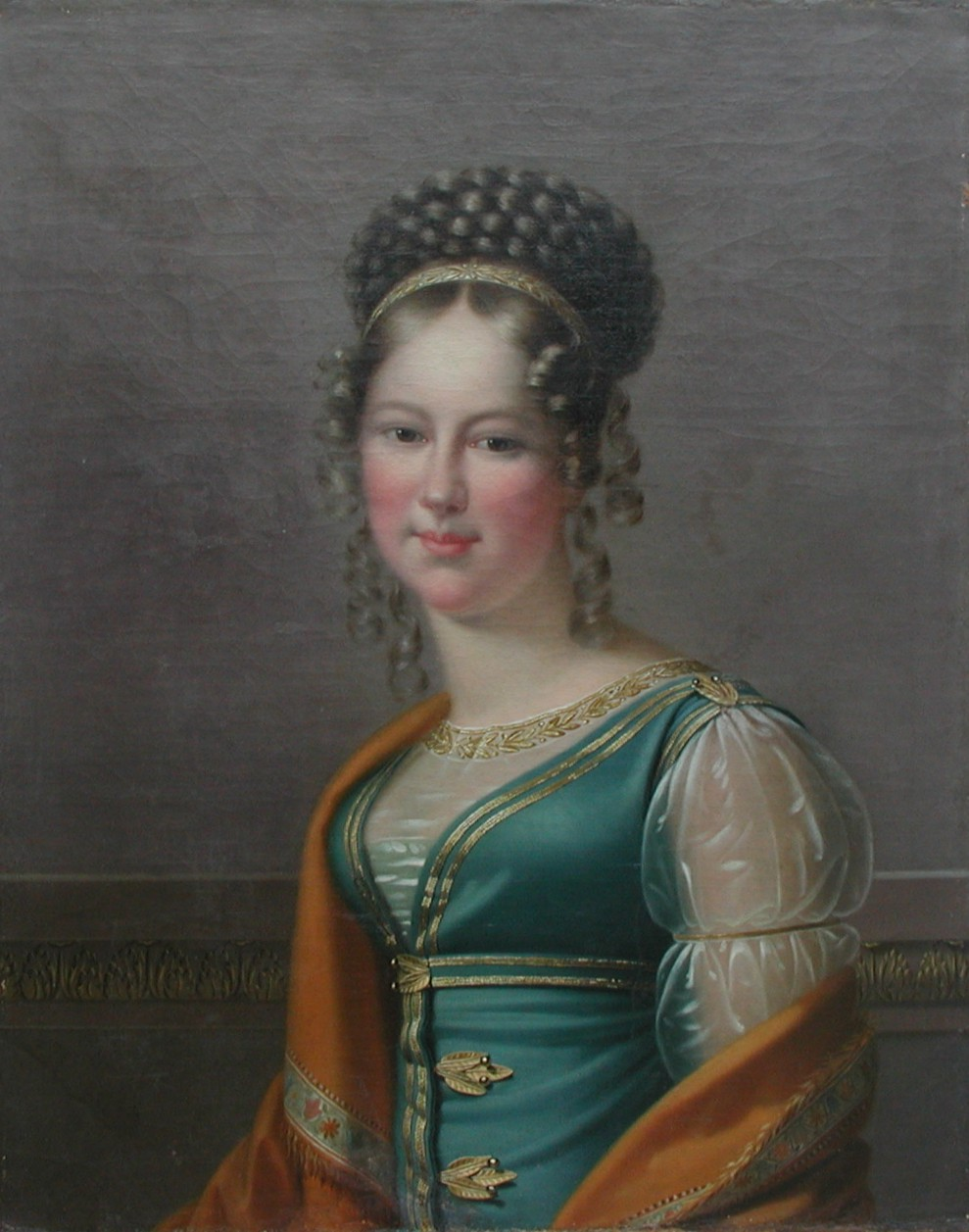
Princess Maria Antoninia Koháry - the last of the family

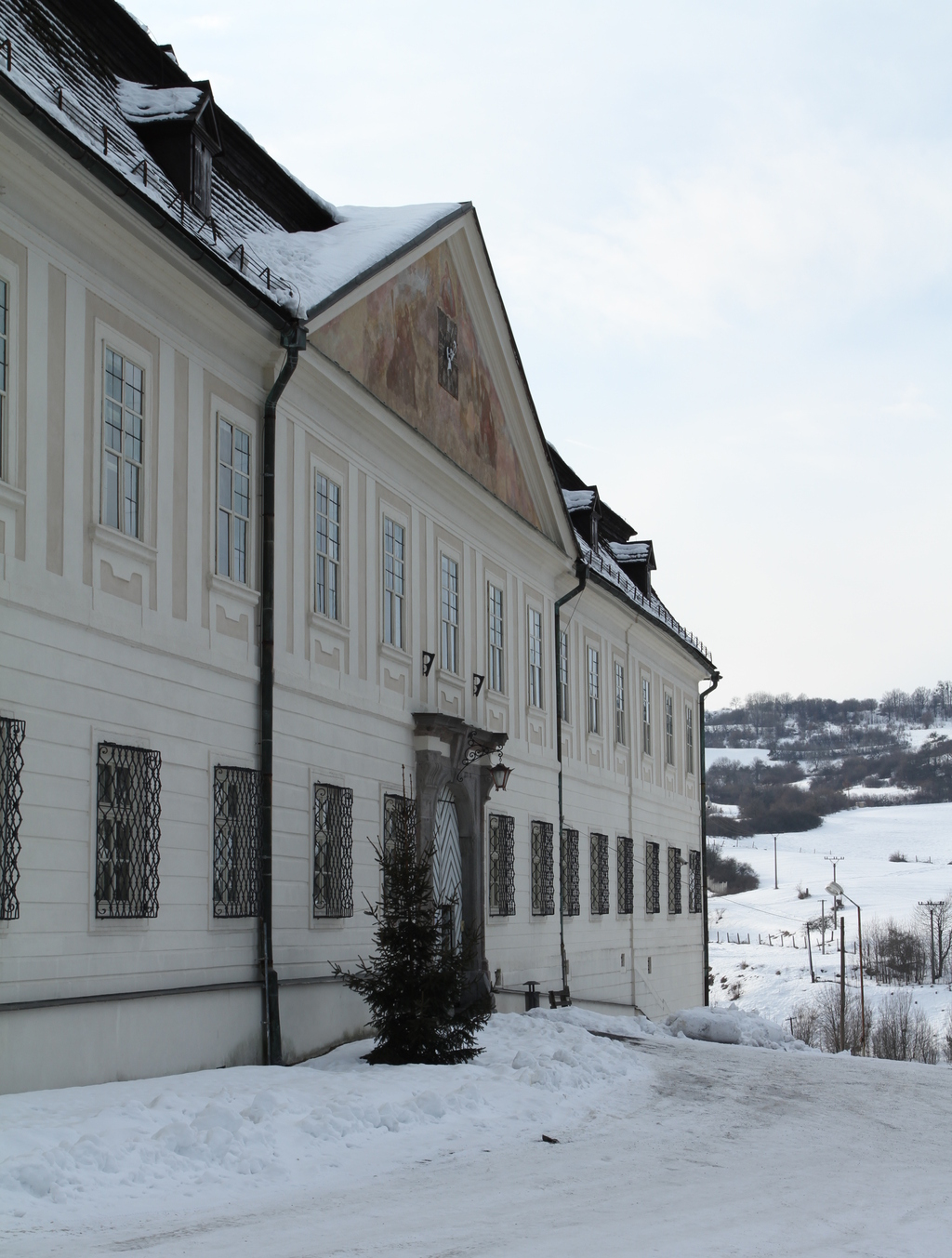
The manor House in winter

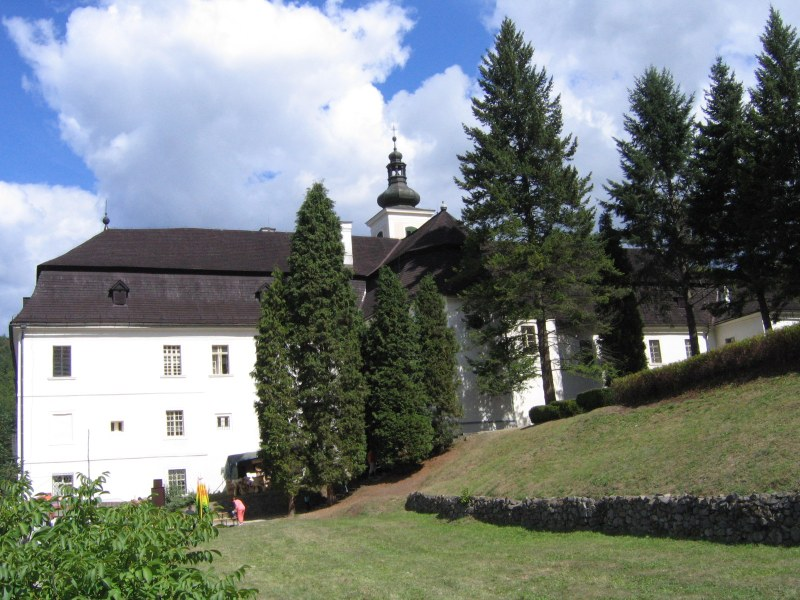
The south side of the manor House

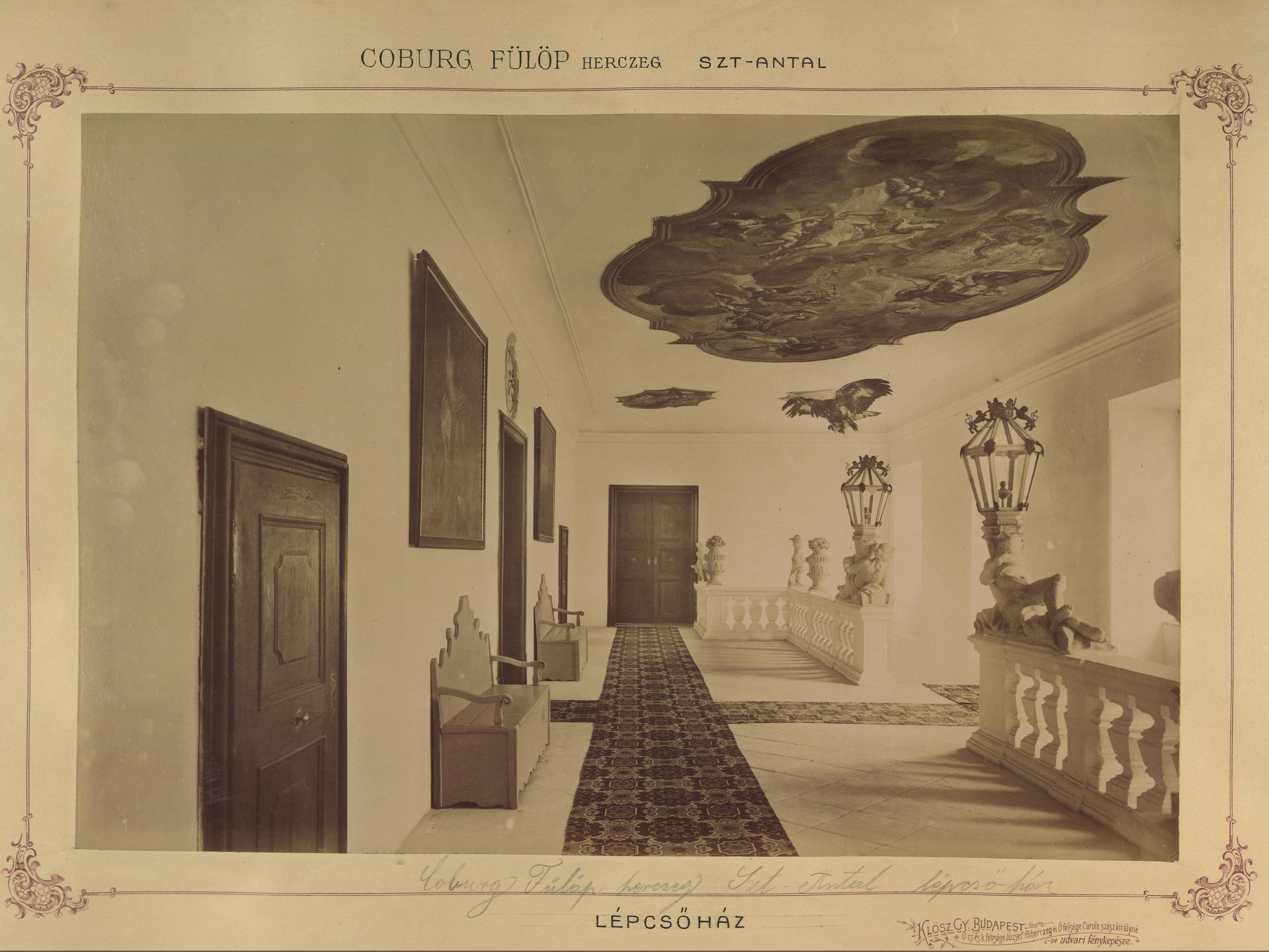
Historical image of the staircase

The Svätý Anton manor house (Slovak: Kaštieľ Svätý Anton or Kaštieľ Antol or Koháriovský kaštieľ) is a late baroque-classicist mansion constructed in 1744 with an English landscape garden park in Svätý Anton, Slovakia. It was one of the main residences of the Saxe-Coburg and Gotha-Koháry family. Both the mansion and park are open to the public.

== History ==
=== Beginning ===
The village of Svätý Anton (English: Saint Anthony) was mentioned for the first time in 1266. In 1405, the sons of Ladilaslav Kakas acquire the village from the Hungarian king Sigismund of Luxembourg (1368-1437). In 1415, a small castle was erected to protect a profitable toll station. In the second half of the 15th century, the castle came into the possession of the lords of Čabraď Castle.

In the 16th century, Cardinal Tamás Bakócz and Peter Pálffy belonged to the owners of the castle. The castle was strongly rebuilt to protect it against the Turkish invasions under the guidance of an architect called Giullio Ferrari.

=== Koháry family ===
In 1622, the estates of Čabraď castle and Svätý Anton came in the hands of the House of Koháry family, a family who gained its wealth due to its loyalty to the House of Habsburg. They replaced medieval castle by a two-winged manor during the 17th century. In 1744, count Andrew Kohary (1694-1757) decided to move his ancestral seat from Čabraď castle to Svätý Anton. As part of this move, he reconstructed the manor into a four-winged manor house with an inner courtyard between 1744 and 1750. The baroque interior was finished in 1752. He was succeeded by his sons Nikolaus (1721-1769), Ignac (1726-1777), and Jan. The last Kohary to live at Svätý Anton was Ferenc József (17767-1826), who was elevated to prince by Emperor Francis I of Austria in 1815.

=== Saxe-Coburg and Gotha-Koháry family ===
Ferenc József's daughter, princess Maria Antonia (1797-1862), inherited all his estates and wealth. She was one of the three largest landowners in the kingdom of Hungary. On 30 November 1815, in Vienna, Maria Antonia married Prince Ferdinand of Saxe-Coburg and Gotha (1785-1851). He was an elder brother of Prince Leopold, future King of the Belgians but then consort to Princess Charlotte of Wales, who was expected to inherit the crown of Great Britain, and also elder brother of the Duchess of Kent, mother of the future Queen Victoria. They founded the Koháry branch of the House of Saxe-Coburg and Gotha (the Catholic branch). Until the First World War, they belonged to the three largest landowners in Hungary.

The grandson of Ferdinand and Maria Antonia became the first king of Bulgaria, Ferdinand I of Bulgaria. After the first world war, he abdicated and left Bulgaria to live in Svätý Anton, Predná Hora, and the Palais Coburg in Vienna. He was devoted to botany, ornithology, and entomology. Also, he liked to hunt and travel around Slovakia in his Mercedes car. In 1944, the king had to leave Slovakia together with the retreating German Army. He fled to Coburg, where he lived in the 'Bulgaren Schlösschen' until his death in 1948.

=== After Second World War ===
After the Second World War, the Communist government confiscated the Kohary estates. In the 1950s, the manor house became the seat of a Forestry, Wood and Hunting Museum, a specialized museum with remarkable collections of natural history, history and art. The exhibition focuses on how the Hungarian nobility lived the 18th and 19th centuries, as well as on the development of forestry and hunting in Slovakia.

== Architecture and interior ==
The four-story building with a central courtyard has all the features of a representative residence. Most of the rooms, halls and corridors have preserved their original interior from the Baroque, Rococo and Empire periods. They have only been minimally affected by later renovations in 1816 and 1860.

In the north wing, an arched underpass with a view into the courtyard leads to a representative staircase, the architecture of which was complemented by paintings and sculptures reflecting the influences of Italian and Austrian art. From there, the first floor is reached leading into the many state rooms and corridors of the mansion.

A chapel richly decorated with frescoes of a late-baroque illusionist space with a free view emerges from the southern tract of the mansion. It is dedicated to the Assumption of the Virgin Mary. The chapel is also highlighted on the outside on the facade, which ends with a fresco connecting the church theme with the motif of the image of the donor.

== Trivia ==
According to legend, the mansion is constructed such that it symbolizes the calendar year: It has four gates (= seasons), twelve chimneys (= months), 52 rooms (= weeks), seven arcades (= days of the week) and 365 windows (= days). However, today, after many reconstructions, it is no longer possible to confirm this.

== Garden ==
A park that melts into a forest is part of the manor house estate. The central park is around five hectares in extent; the forest covers another 25 hectares. The center was a French regular baroque garden combined with a natural-landscape English section. Currently, remnants of a regular baroque treatment can be seen on the terraces near the main building. They loosely melt into the landscaped park and the forest. The preserved water system of the park is supplied by the Kolpassky brook, through a kilometres-long watercourse with aqueducts. In a corner of the park is an artificial grotto, which the locals call 'hell'.

Until 1995, the meadow in front of the cage was dominated by an almost-120-year-old Giant Sequoia (Sequoiadendron giganteum). Prince Philipp of Saxe-Coburg and Gotha planted it there in 1878 when his only son, Leopold, was born. The Sequoia died despite many attempts to save it. A new and healthy successor was planted at the entrance to the park in 1996.

== Literature ==
- Eva Krizanova; Blanka Puskarova (1990). Burgen und Schlösser Slowakei (in German). Vienna/Bratislava: Freytag & Berndt/ Sport. p. 238. ISBN 978-3850849005.
- Peter Maráky; Daniel Kollár; Janka Orsulová (2011). Hrady, Zámky a Kastiele na Slovensku (in Slovak). Bratislava: Reader's Digest Vyber Slovensko. pp. 338–347. ISBN 978-8080971014.
- Laco Struhár; Stano Bellan (2010). The History of Stone - Castles, Palaces and Manor Houses Slovakia. Bratislava: Spektrum Grafik. ISBN 978-8089189212.
