= Palais Coburg =

Palace in Vienna, Austria

Coordinates: 48°12′21″N 16°22′36″E

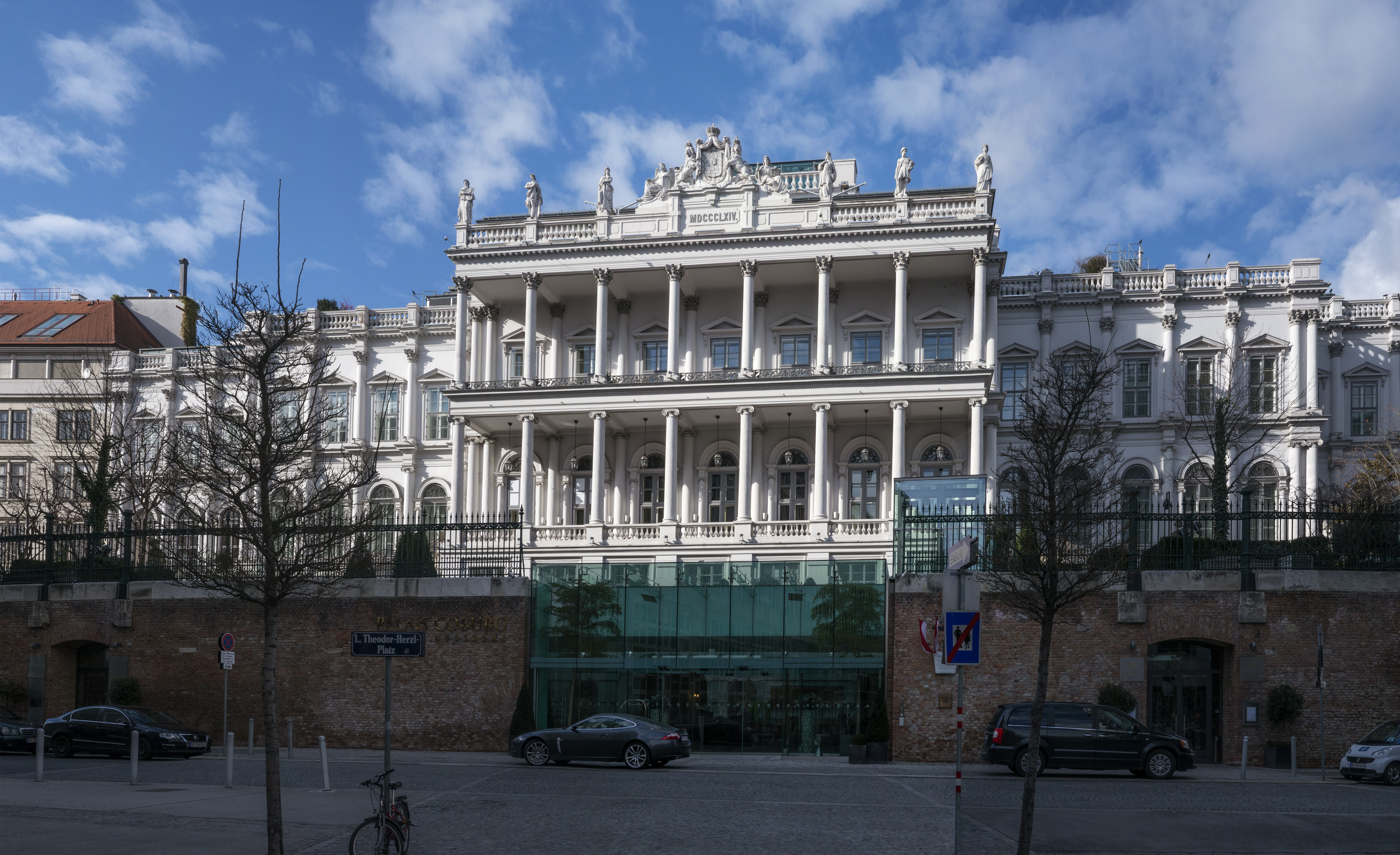
Hotel Palais Coburg

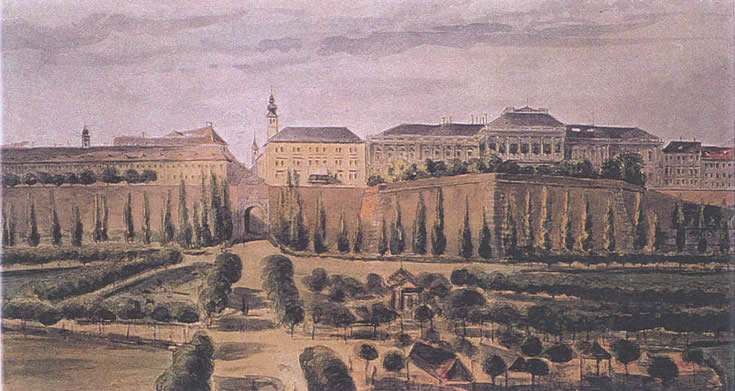
19th century depiction

Palais Coburg, also known as Palais Saxe-Coburg, is a palace in Vienna, Austria. It was owned by the Kohary branch of the House of Saxe-Coburg and Gotha.

Palais Coburg was designed in 1839 by architect Karl Schleps in Neoclassical style, and built from 1840 to 1845 by Prince Ferdinand of Saxe-Coburg and Gotha atop the Braunbastei (Brown Bastion), a part of the Vienna city defences dating to 1555. It is nicknamed the Spargelburg ("castle of asparagus") for its central portico with many freestanding columns.

Its last private owner was Sarah Aurelia Halasz, morganatic widow of Prince Philipp Sachsen-Coburg, who lived there with her family. The owners sold the palace in the 1970s and today is a luxury five star boutique hotel after extensive renovations. The palatial hotel has 33 suites and it was the venue for the Iran nuclear deal signed on 14 July 2015.
