= Predná Hora mansion =

Neo-Baroque]] manor in Slovakia

Coordinates: 48.7717°N 20.1112°E

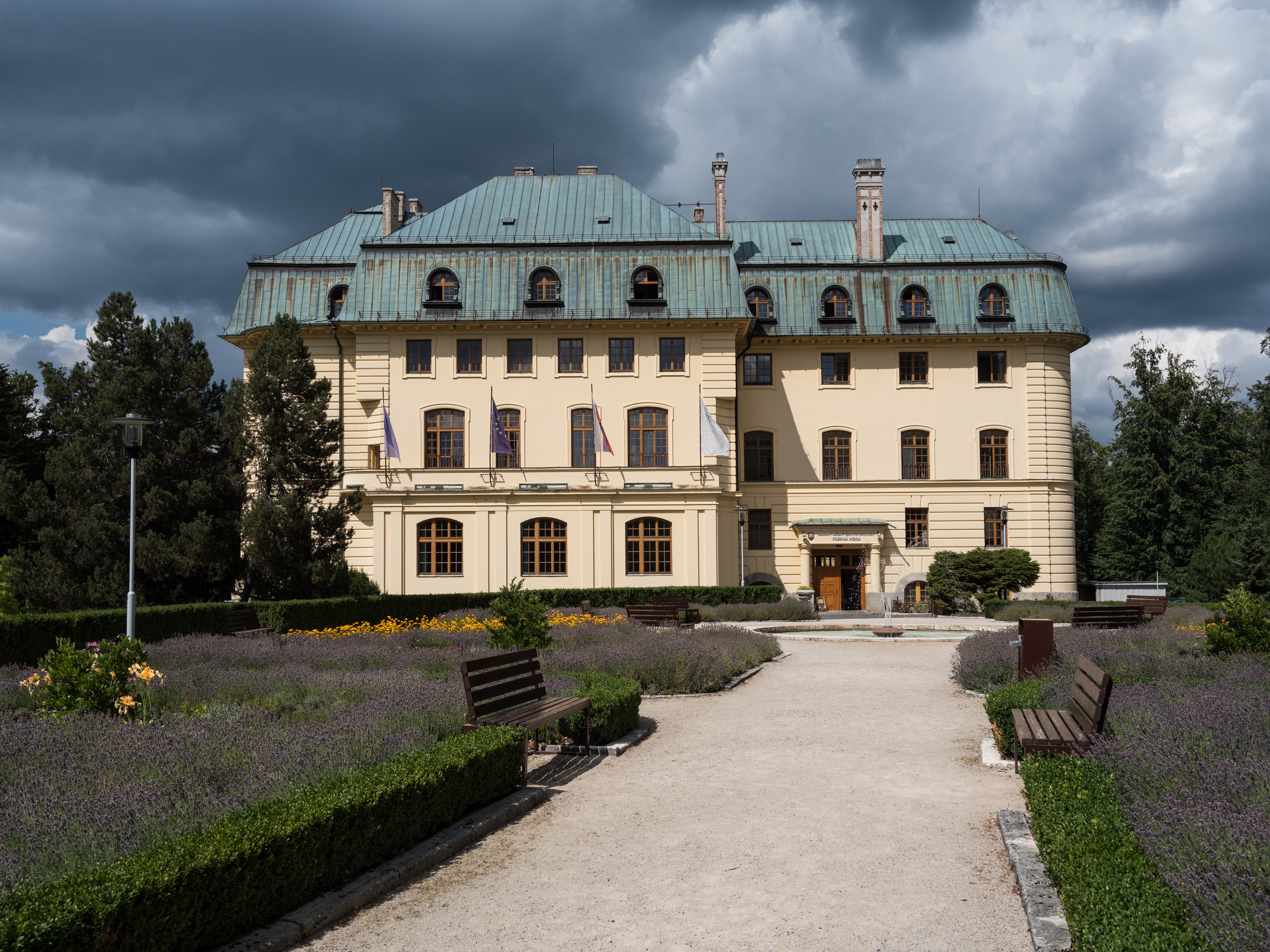
Front view

The Predná Hora mansion (Slovak: Kaštieľ Predná Hora) is a neo-Baroque manor in Muráň, Slovakia, once belonging to king Ferdinand I of Bulgaria. Today, the manor is a sanatorium.

== History ==
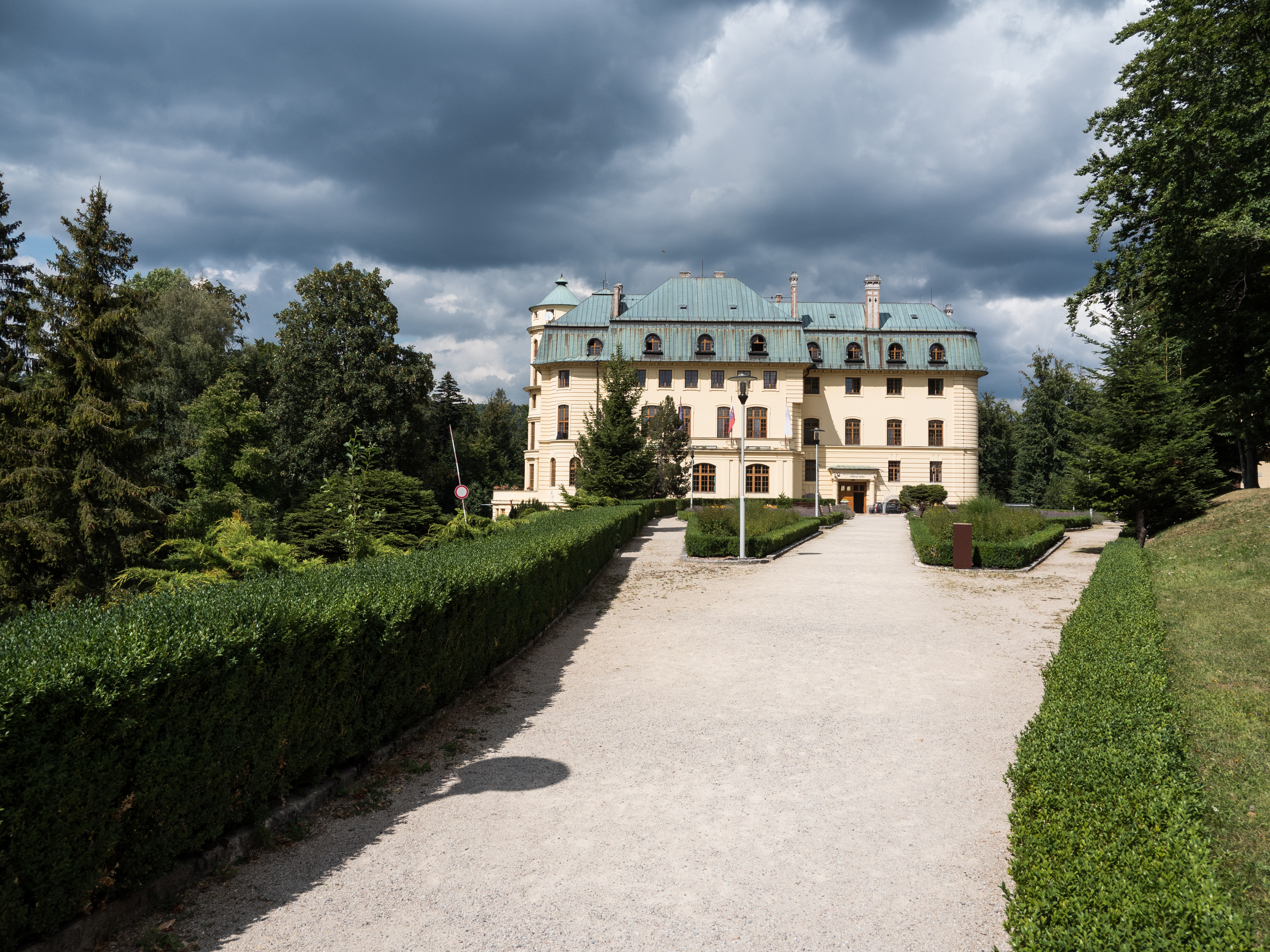
Courtyard

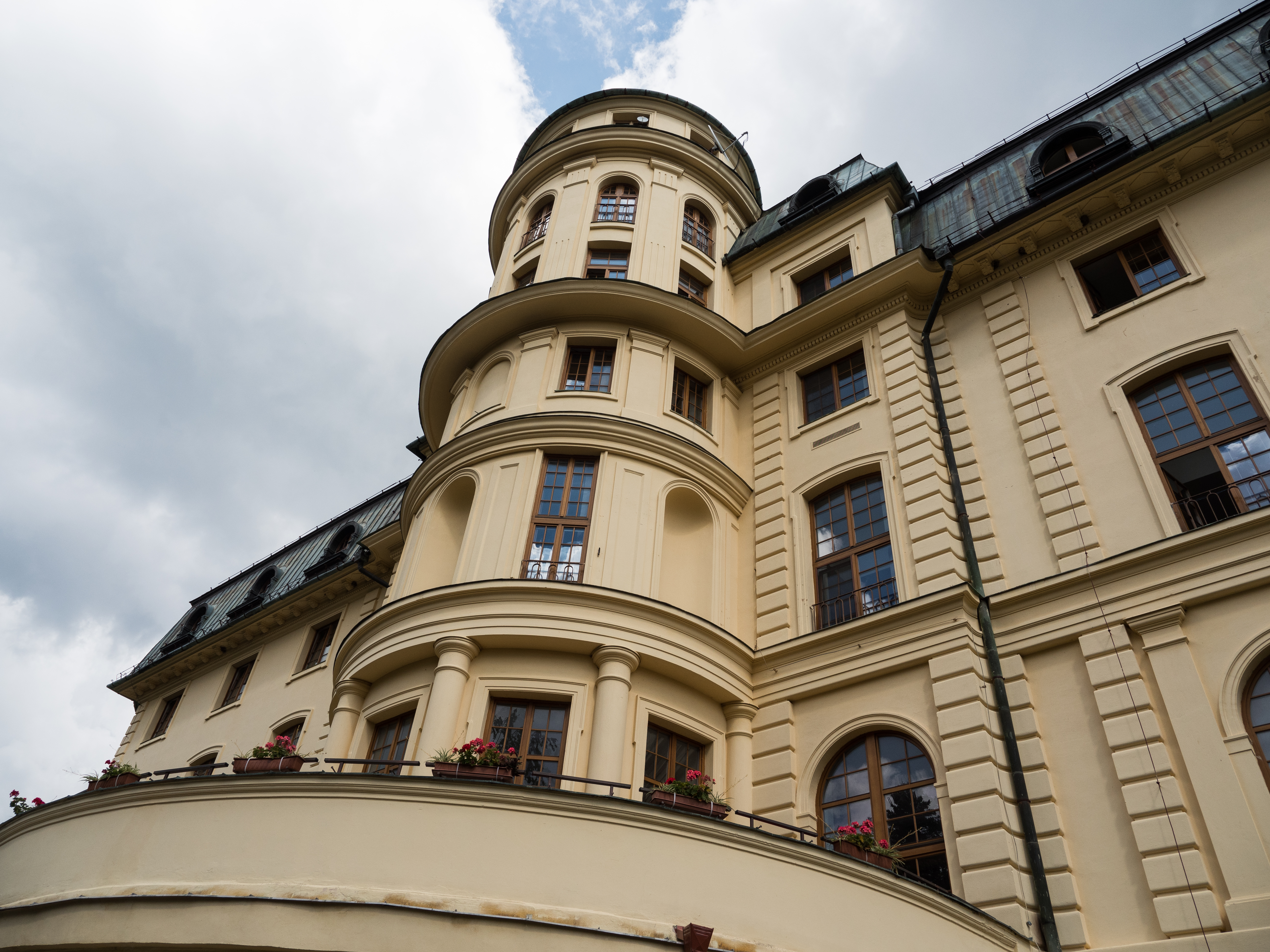
Detail of the mansion

King Ferdinand of Bulgaria wanted to have a winter residence in the Slovak mountains. The architects were D. Jakab an M. Komora, and belonged to the Budapest company Kondoras-Feledi, who designed a five-storey building in neo-baroque style with a glazed courtyard, a monumental staircase, botanical gardens and a heated pond. Construction started in 1912 and was completed within two years, short before the First World War.

After his abdication as Bulgarian King in 1918, the house became the king's main residence together with his manor house in Svätý Anton. In 1944, the king had to leave Slovakia together with the retreating German Army. He fled to Coburg, where he lived in the 'Bulgaren Schlösschen' until his death in 1948.

The mansion and estate where confiscated by the Communist government. After 1948, they decided to use the mansion as a tuberculosis sanatorium, which started in 1952. Rebuilding was by the architect J. Tvarozek. In 1973, it was changed into an alcohol treatment centre. In 1995, it also became a hospital for treatment of addiction to drugs and compulsive gambling. The hospital works together with universities and hospitals in Poland, the Czech Republic, and Sweden.

The king was a passionate hunter and he also built a small hunting lodge in the forest around the mansion. Today, it contains an exhibition on the king and can be visited. One can also see the bedroom, the study and the kitchen.
