= Princess Amalie of Saxe-Coburg and Gotha =

Princess Amalie
- Duchess Maximilian Emanuel in Bavaria
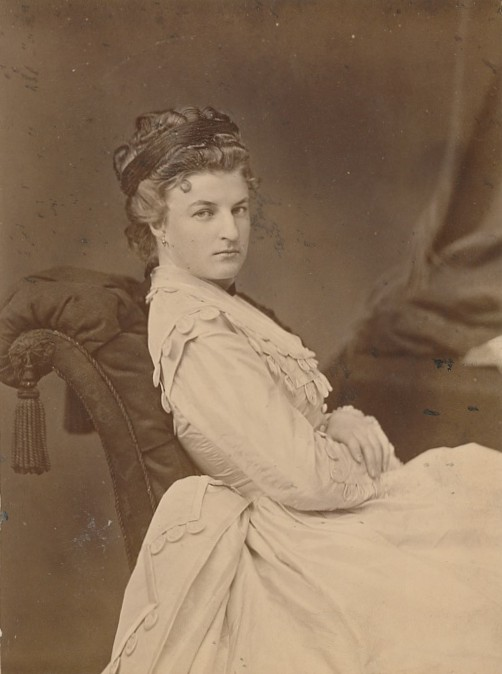
- Photograph c. 1880–89
- Born: 23 October 1848; Coburg, Saxe-Coburg and Gotha
- Died: 6 May 1894 (aged 45); Schloss Biederstein, Schwabing, Munich, Kingdom of Bavaria
- Spouse: Duke Maximilian Emanuel in Bavaria (m. 1875; died 1893)
- Issue: Duke Siegfried August; Duke Christoph; Duke Luitpold
Names
- German: Marie Luise Franziska Amalie
- House: Saxe-Coburg and Gotha
- Father: Prince August of Saxe-Coburg and Gotha
- Mother: Princess Clémentine of Orléans

Princess Amalie of Saxe-Coburg and Gotha (Marie Luise Franziska Amalie; 23 October 1848 – 6 May 1894) was a Princess of Saxe-Coburg and Gotha by birth and a Duchess in Bavaria through her marriage to Duke Maximilian Emanuel in Bavaria. Amalie was the fourth child and second eldest daughter of Prince August of Saxe-Coburg and Gotha and his wife Princess Clémentine of Orléans. Her youngest brother was Ferdinand I of Bulgaria and her paternal uncle was Ferdinand II of Portugal.

== Life ==
=== Early years ===
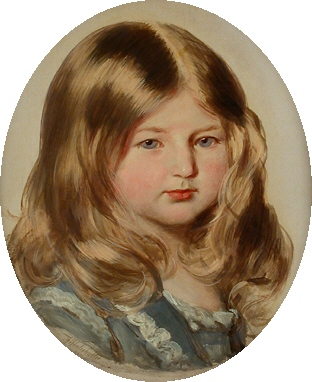
Princess Amalie in 1855, by Franz Xaver Winterhalter.

Princess Amalie was born in Coburg, Germany, to Prince August of Saxe-Coburg and Gotha and his wife, Princess Clémentine of Orléans. Since childhood, Amalie had been intended as the bride of Prince Leopold of Bavaria. However, Duke Maximilian Emanuel in Bavaria fell in love with her and confided this love to his sister Elisabeth.

Elisabeth—the empress of Austria and queen of Hungary—became determined to ensure her favorite brother's happiness, for she invited Leopold to an extended visit with the imperial family, among those who attended was her own fifteen-year-old daughter Archduchess Gisela of Austria. There, Leopold was tactfully made aware that a marriage with Gisela would be looked upon with favor by Emperor Franz Joseph. If Leopold was to marry Gisela, he would become the emperor's son-in-law; upon realizing this, he accepted and became engaged to Gisela after only a few days.

=== Marriage ===
Duke Maximillian and Princess Amalie were married on 20 September 1875 in Ebenthal, Lower Austria, Austria-Hungary. The marriage was, by all accounts, a very happy one.

==== Children ====
Amalie and Maximilian Emanuel had three sons:

- Siegfried, Duke in Bavaria (10 July 1876 – 12 March 1952)
- Christoph Joseph Clemens, Duke in Bavaria (22 April 1879 – 10 July 1963)
- Luitpold Emanuel, Duke in Bavaria (30 June 1890 – 16 January 1973)

=== Death ===
On 6 May 1894, at the age of 45, Princess Amalie died due to peritonitis.

== Ancestry ==
Ancestors of Princess Amalie of Saxe-Coburg and Gotha

8. Francis, Duke of Saxe-Coburg-Saalfeld
4. Prince Ferdinand of Saxe-Coburg and Gotha
9. Countess Augusta Reuss of Ebersdorf
2. Prince August of Saxe-Coburg and Gotha
10. Ferenc József, Prince Koháry de Csábrág et Szitnya
5. Princess Maria Antonia Koháry of Csábrág and Szitnya
11. Countess Maria Antonia von Waldstein
1. Princess Amalie of Saxe-Coburg and Gotha
12. Louis Philippe II, Duke of Orléans
6. Louis Philippe I of France
13. Louise Marie Adélaïde de Bourbon
3. Princess Clémentine of Orléans
14. Ferdinand I of the Two Sicilies
7. Princess Maria Amalia of Naples and Sicily
15. Archduchess Maria Carolina of Austria
