= Maximilian of Bavaria =

Maximilian of Bavaria may refer to:

- Maximilian I, Elector of Bavaria (1573–1651)
- Maximilian II Emanuel, Elector of Bavaria (1662–1726)
- Maximilian III Joseph, Elector of Bavaria (1727–1777)
- Maximilian I Joseph of Bavaria (1756–1825)
- Maximilian II of Bavaria (1811–1864)
- Duke Maximilian Joseph in Bavaria (1808–1888)
- Duke Maximilian Emanuel in Bavaria (1849–1893)
- Prince Max, Duke in Bavaria (born 1937)
