= House of Saxe-Coburg and Gotha =

European royal house of German origin

- Parent house: Wettin (Ernestine line)
- Country: Duchy of Saxe-Coburg-Saalfeld: Duchy of Saxe-Coburg and Gotha; Kingdom of Belgium; Kingdom of Portugal; Principality/Kingdom of Bulgaria; United Kingdom of Great Britain and Ireland
- Founded: 1826; 200 years ago
- Founder: Ernest I of Saxe-Coburg and Gotha
- Current head: Hubertus, Prince of Saxe-Coburg and Gotha (official); Prince Richard, Duke of Gloucester (agnatic)
- Deposition: 1910 (in Portugal); 1918 (in Saxe-Coburg and Gotha); 1946 (in Bulgaria)
- Cadet branches: Windsor; Mountbatten-Windsor (Surname); Saxe-Coburg and Gotha-Koháry; Braganza-Saxe-Coburg and Gotha (Portugal; extinct in 1932); Bulgarian royal family; Belgium; Eppinghoven (illegitimate); Grimaldi (illegitimate)

The House of Saxe-Coburg and Gotha (/ˌsæks ˈkoʊbərɡ ... ˈɡɒθə, - ˈɡɒtə/ SAKS KOH-bərg ... GOT(H)-ə; German: Haus Sachsen-Coburg und Gotha), known until 1826 as the House of Saxe-Coburg-Saalfeld (Haus Sachsen-Coburg-Saalfeld), is a European royal house of German origin. It takes its name from its oldest domain, the Ernestine duchy of Saxe-Coburg and Gotha, and its members later sat on the thrones of Belgium, Bulgaria, Portugal, and the United Kingdom and its dominions. The British branch was officially renamed to House of Windsor by British king George V in 1917, during the First World War, amid anti-German sentiment.

Founded in 1826 by Ernest Anton, the sixth duke of Saxe-Coburg-Saalfeld, it is a cadet branch of the Saxon House of Wettin. An agnatic branch of the family currently reigns in Belgium (the descendants of Leopold I). In Belgium, due to similar resentment against Germany after the Great War, the use of the name was also changed in 1920 by King Albert I to "de Belgique" (French), "van België" (Dutch) or "von Belgien" (German), meaning "of Belgium". However, the "Saxe-Coburg" house name of the Belgian royal family was never officially abolished, and since relations between Belgium and Germany have been normalized for a long time, the use of this family name has been slowly reintroduced since the 2010s (especially since King Philippe of Belgium wants to limit the number of princes and princesses of Belgium, and thus the use of the designation "of Belgium", to only a select group of his family).

== History ==
=== Origins of the House of Saxe-Coburg-Saalfeld ===
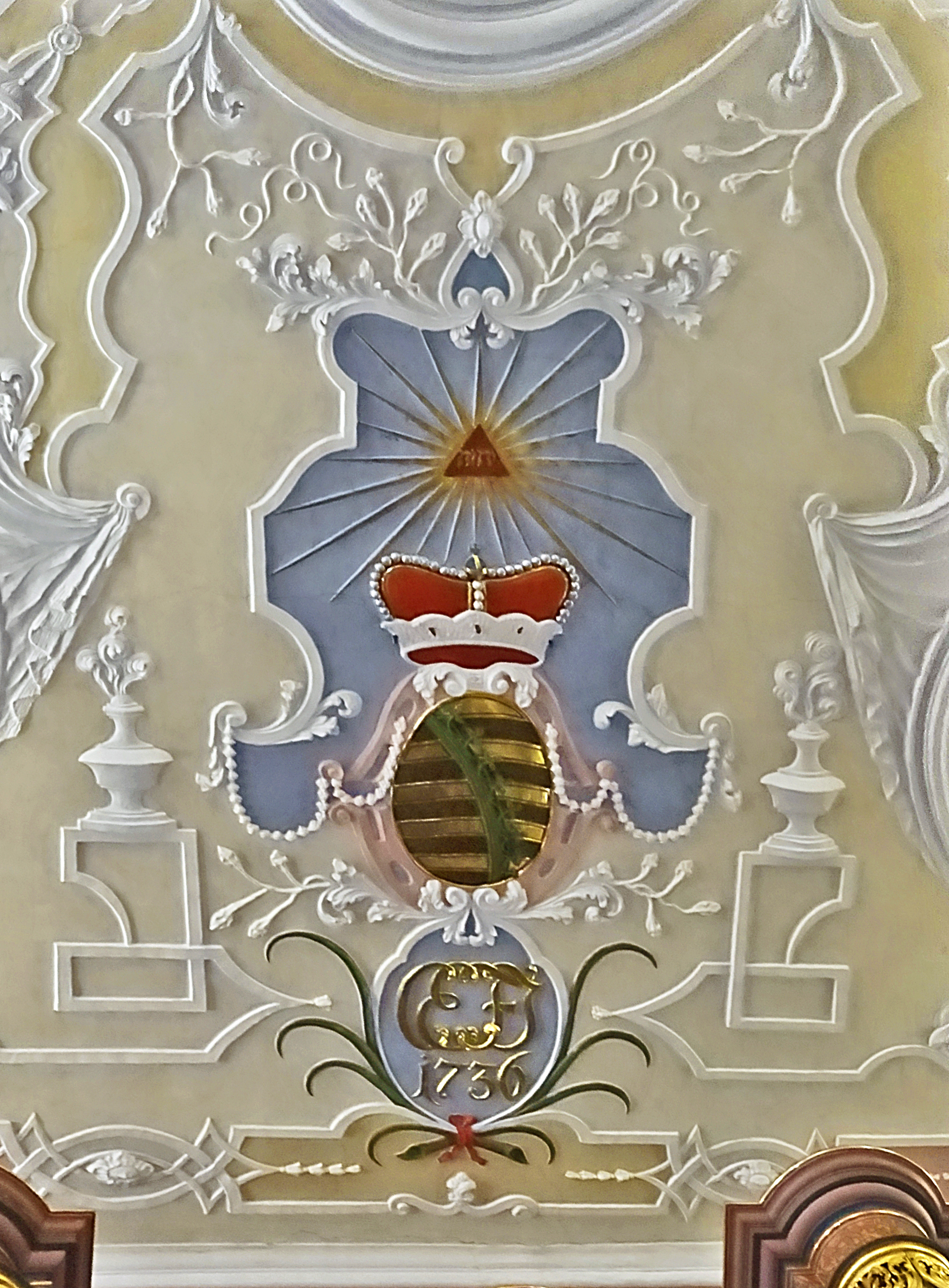
Coat of arms of the Duchy of Saxe-Coburg-Saalfeld (1736) in the stucco ceiling of the Holy Cross Church, Coburg.

Following the death of Duke Ernest I, Duke of Saxe-Gotha in 1675, his seven sons divided their inheritance in the Gothaer Hauptrezess of 1680. The youngest, John Ernest IV, received Saalfeld and became the progenitor of what later became the House of Saxe-Coburg and Gotha. After the death of his childless brother Albert in 1699, a succession dispute over Saxe-Coburg ended in 1735 with most of the territory transferred to Johann Ernest's line, forming the duchy of Saxe-Coburg-Saalfeld.

Johann Ernest's sons, Christian Ernest and Francis Josias, at first governed the newly formed duchy together. Following Christian Ernest's death in 1745, Francis Josias became the sole ruler and introduced primogeniture in 1747 to prevent future partitions. He was succeeded in turn by his descendants, Ernest Frederick, Francis, and finally Ernest Anton as Ernest I (1784–1844). For his military service against Napoleon, Ernest I received the Principality of Lichtenberg in 1816, but later sold it to Prussia in 1834 due to unrest and its distance from the core territories.

=== Origins of the Duchy of Saxe-Coburg and Gotha ===
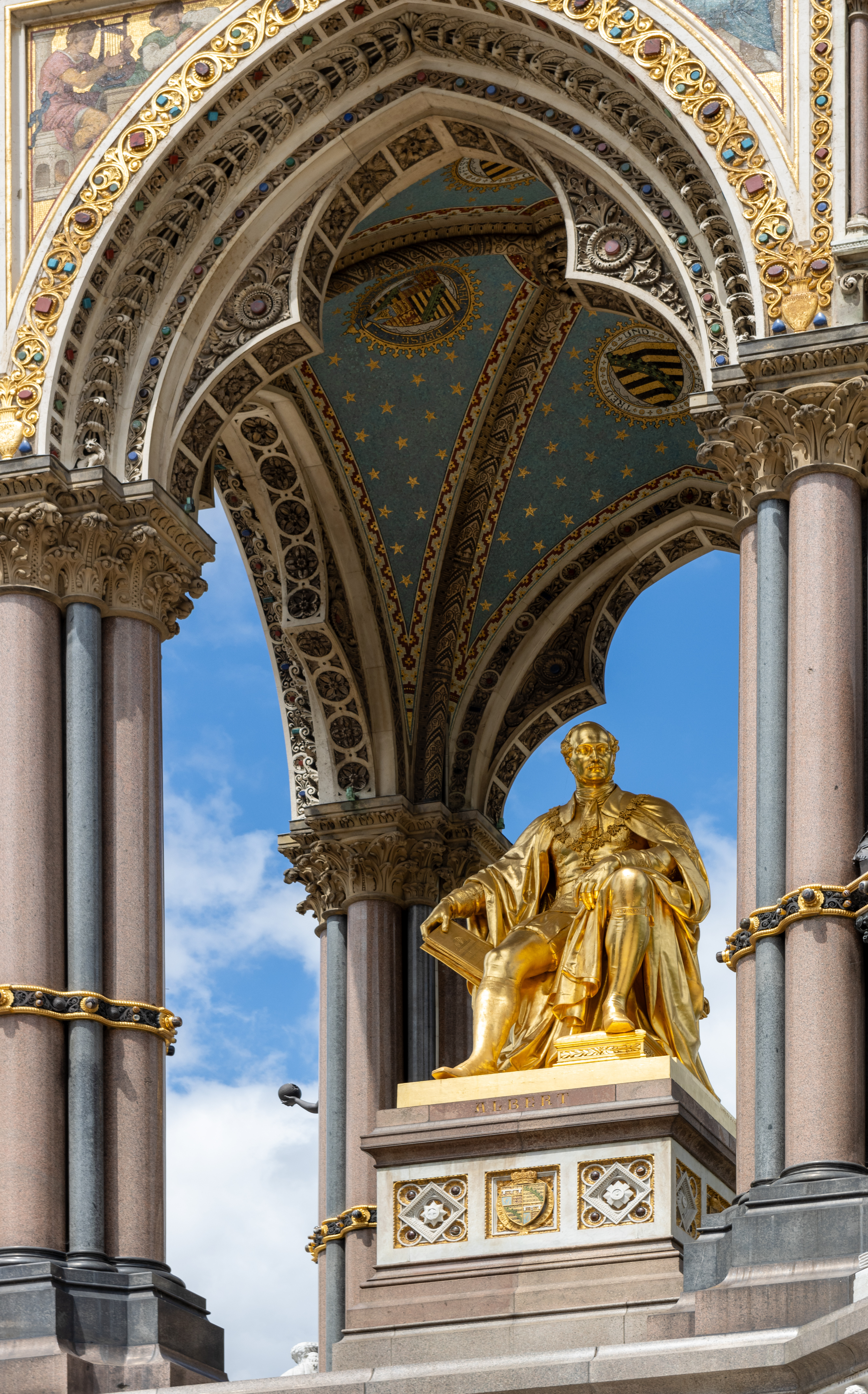
Prince Albert was the link through which the House of Saxe-Coburg and Gotha came to the British throne in 1901, when his son Edward VII ascended the throne. The dynasty was later renamed the House of Windsor by George V in 1917.

The first duke of Saxe-Coburg and Gotha was Ernest I, who ruled from 1826 until his death in 1844. Before the territorial reorganization of 1826, he had reigned as Duke of Saxe-Coburg-Saalfeld (as Ernest III) from 1806 onward.

Ernest's younger brother Leopold became King of the Belgians in 1831, and his descendants continue to serve as Belgian monarchs. Leopold's only daughter, Princess Charlotte of Belgium, was the consort of Maximilian I of Mexico, and she was known as Empress Carlota of Mexico in the 1860s.

Ernest I's second son, Prince Albert (1819–1861), married his first cousin Queen Victoria in 1840 (Victoria's mother was a sister of Ernest I). Prince Albert thus is the progenitor of the United Kingdom's current royal family, called the House of Windsor since 1917.

=== Cadet branches and royal houses ===
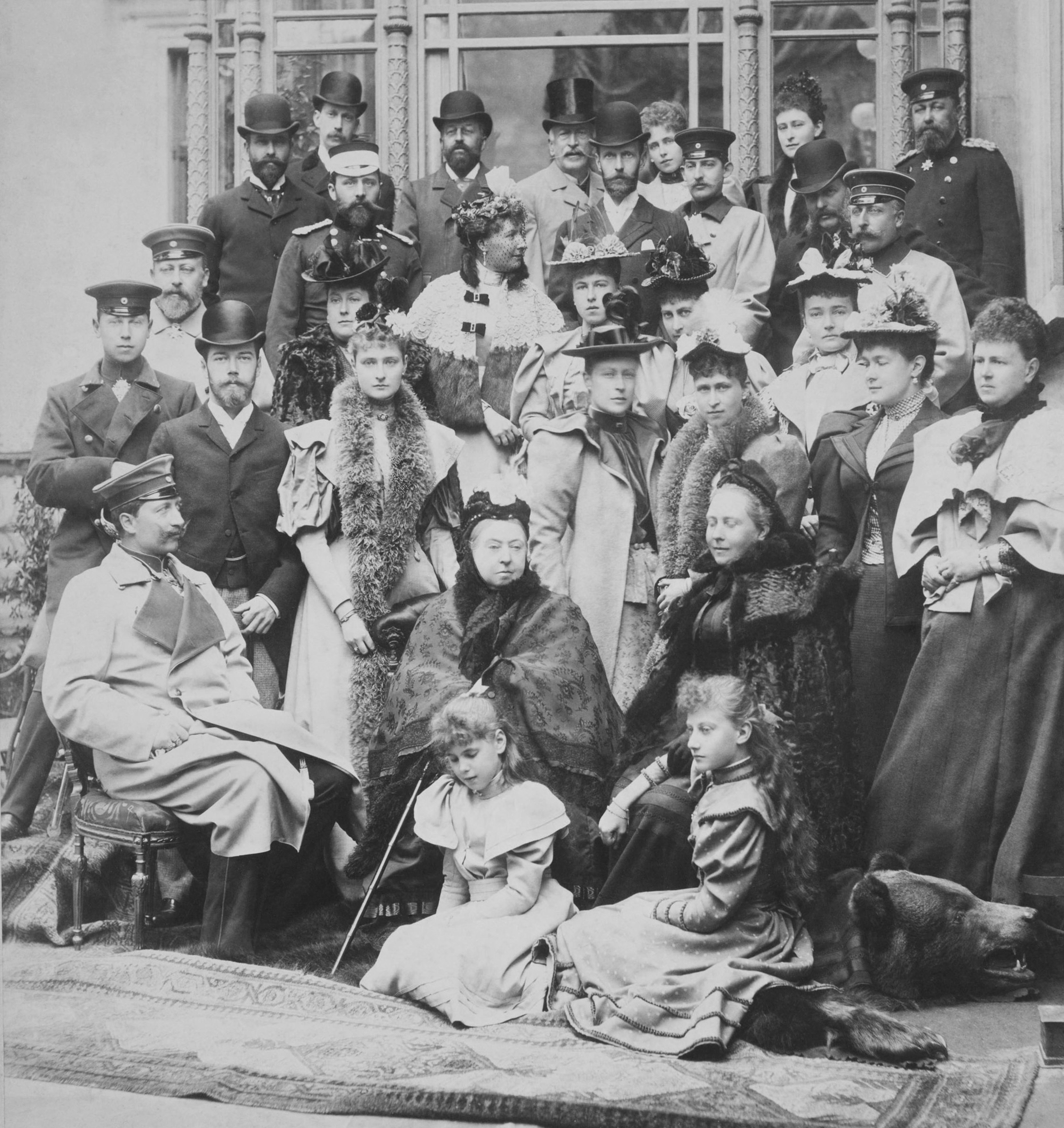
Queen Victoria in Coburg in April 1894 reunited with all her extended family, ranging from Nicholas II (soon-to-be tsar of Russia in the same year) to the Kaiser Wilhelm II and other relatives of the House. (click to view the photo on Commons and read about every person in detail)

In 1826, a cadet branch of the house inherited the Hungarian princely estate of the Koháry family and converted to Roman Catholicism. Through this line its members contracted marriages with:

- a queen regnant of Portugal;
- an imperial princess of Brazil;
- an archduchess of Austria;
- a French royal princess;
- a royal princess of Belgium;
- a royal princess of Saxony.

A scion of this branch, Ferdinand, became ruling Prince and then Tsar of Bulgaria, and his descendants continued to reign there until 1946. The current head of the Bulgarian branch of the family, the former tsar Simeon Saxe-Coburg-Gotha, was deposed and sent into exile after World War II. Under the name Simeon Sakskoburggotski he later served as Bulgaria's prime minister from 2001 to 2005.

=== Ducal house, titles and residences ===
The ducal house consisted of all male-line descendants of John Ernest IV, Duke of Saxe-Coburg-Saalfeld who were legitimately born of an equal marriage, males and females (the latter until their marriage), their wives in equal and authorised marriages, and their widows until remarriage. According to the House law of the Duchy of Saxe-Coburg and Gotha, the full title of the duke was:

Wir, Ernst, Herzog zu Sachsen-Coburg und Gotha, Jülich, Cleve und Berg, auch Engern und Westphalen, Landgraf in Thüringen, Markgraf zu Meißen, gefürsteter Graf zu Henneberg, Graf zu der Mark und Ravensberg, Herr zu Ravenstein und Tonna usw.

We, Ernst, Duke of Saxe-Coburg and Gotha, Jülich, Cleves and Berg, also Angria and Westphalia, Landgrave in Thuringia, Margrave of Meissen, Princely Count of Henneberg, Count of Mark and Ravensberg, Lord of Ravenstein and Tonna, and so forth.

There were two official residences, at Gotha and at Coburg. Accordingly, the whole ducal court, including the court theatre, moved twice a year: from Gotha to Coburg for the summer and from Coburg to Gotha for the winter.

For the court theatre, two almost identical buildings were erected in 1840 in Gotha (destroyed in World War II) and in Coburg (now the Coburg State Theater), and thereafter maintained simultaneously. In addition to the residential castles, Friedenstein Palace in Gotha and Ehrenburg Palace in Coburg, the ducal family also used Schloss Reinhardsbrunn in Friedrichroda near Gotha, as well as Schloss Rosenau and Callenberg Castle in Coburg, and a hunting lodge, Greinburg Castle, in Grein.

== Branches ==
=== Ducal branch ===
==== Dukes from 1826 to 1918 ====
- Ernest I (1826–1844)
- Ernest II (1844–1893)
- Alfred (1893–1900)
- Charles Edward (1900–1918)

==== Heads of the house since 1918 ====
- Charles Edward (1918–1954)
- Friedrich Josias (1954–1998)
- Andreas (1998–2025)
- Hubertus (2025–present)

Although the ducal branch is eponymous with the dynasty, its head is not the senior member of the family genealogically or agnatically. In 1893, the reigning duke Ernest II died childless, whereupon the throne would have devolved, by male primogeniture, upon the descendants of his brother Prince Albert. However, as heirs to the British throne, Albert's descendants consented and the law of the duchy ratified that the ducal throne would not be inherited by the British monarch or heir apparent. Therefore, the German duchy became a secundogeniture, hereditary among the younger princes of the British royal family who belonged to the House of Wettin, and their male-line descendants.

Instead of Albert Edward, Prince of Wales (the future Edward VII of the United Kingdom) inheriting the duchy, it was diverted to his next brother, Prince Alfred, Duke of Edinburgh. Upon the latter's death without surviving sons, it went to the youngest grandson of Prince Albert and Queen Victoria, Prince Charles Edward, Duke of Albany. Charles Edward's uncle Prince Arthur, Duke of Connaught and his male line had renounced their claim. Although senior by birth, they were either not acceptable to the German Emperor as either a member of the British military or unwilling to move to Germany.

The current head of the ducal branch is Hubertus, the great-grandson of Charles Edward. Since the duchy was abolished in 1918, the heads use the title Prince rather than Duke.

Coat of arms of Saxony

Coat of arms of the duchy of Saxe-Coburg and Gotha

Heraldic shield of Saxe-Coburg and Gotha

Personal arms of the family since the reign of Charles Edward

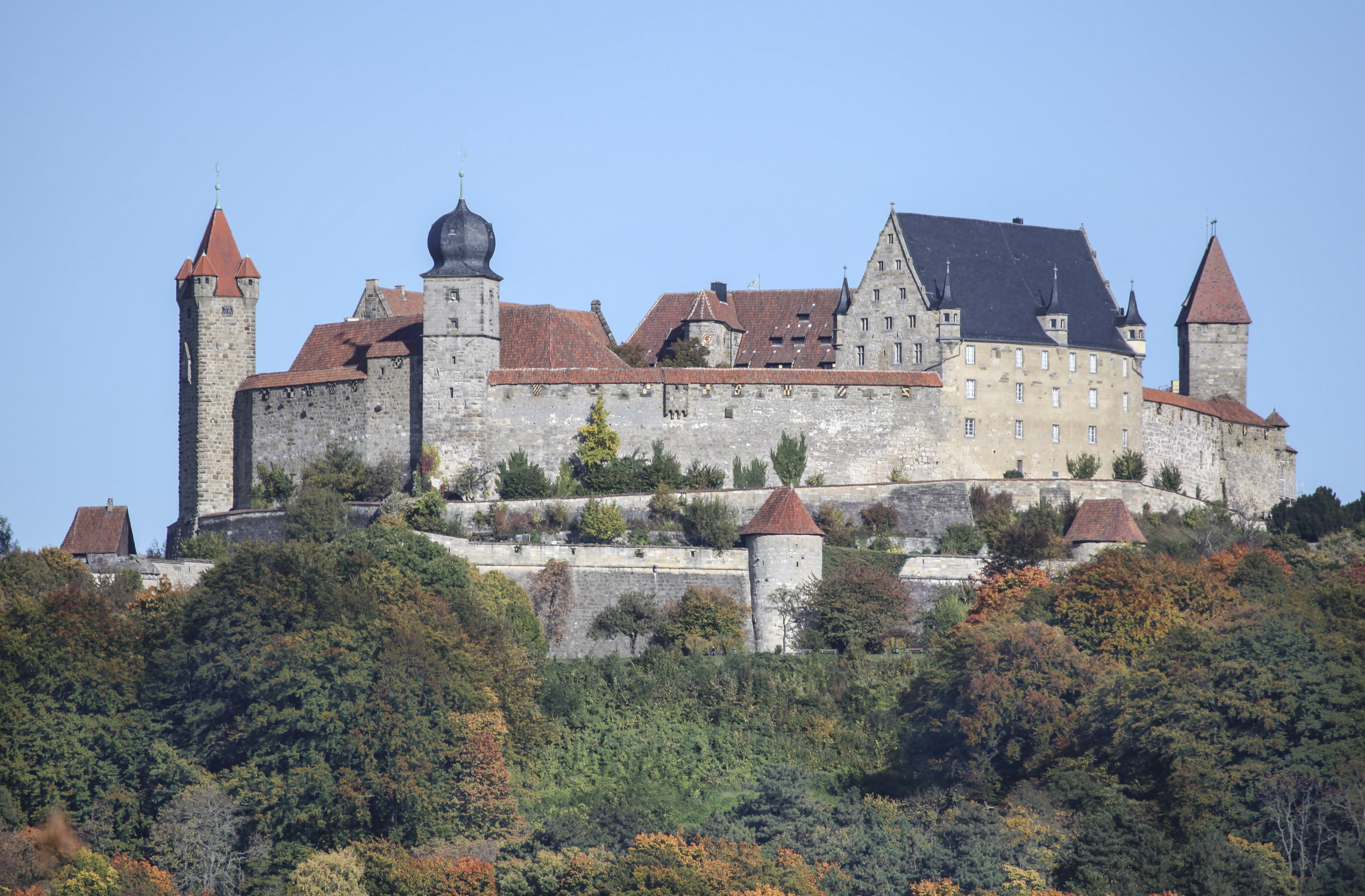
Veste Coburg, ancestral seat of the House of Saxe-Coburg

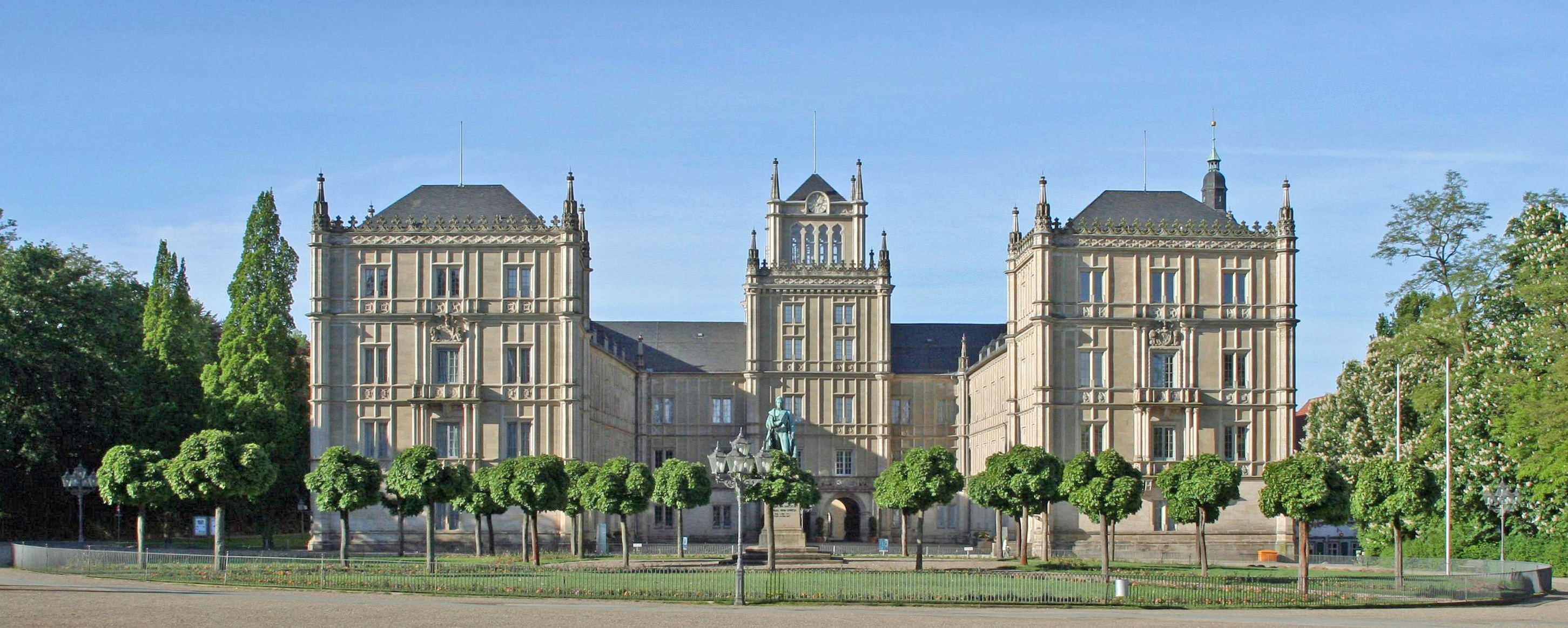
Ehrenburg Palace, Coburg (summer residence)

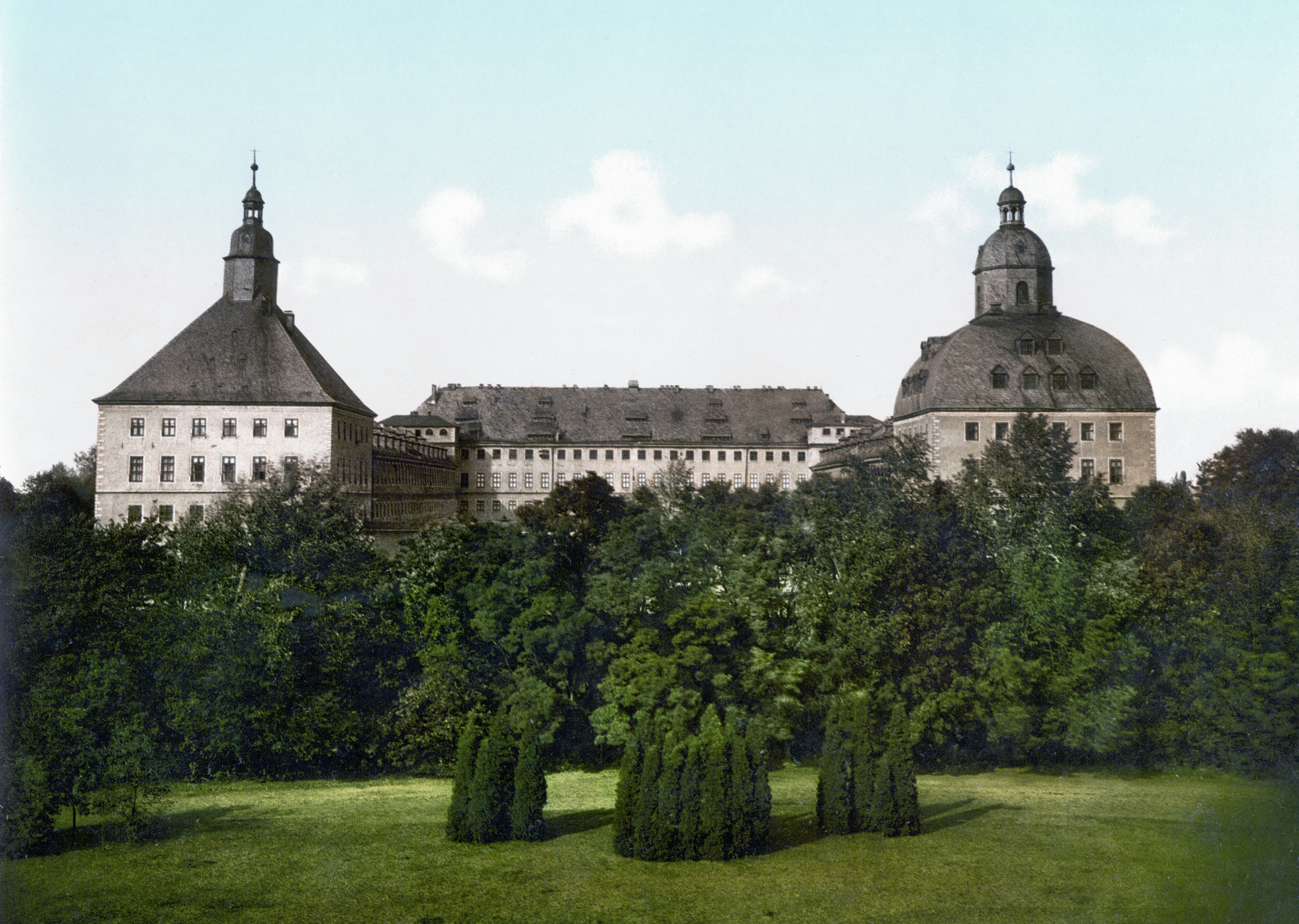
Friedenstein Castle, Gotha (winter residence)

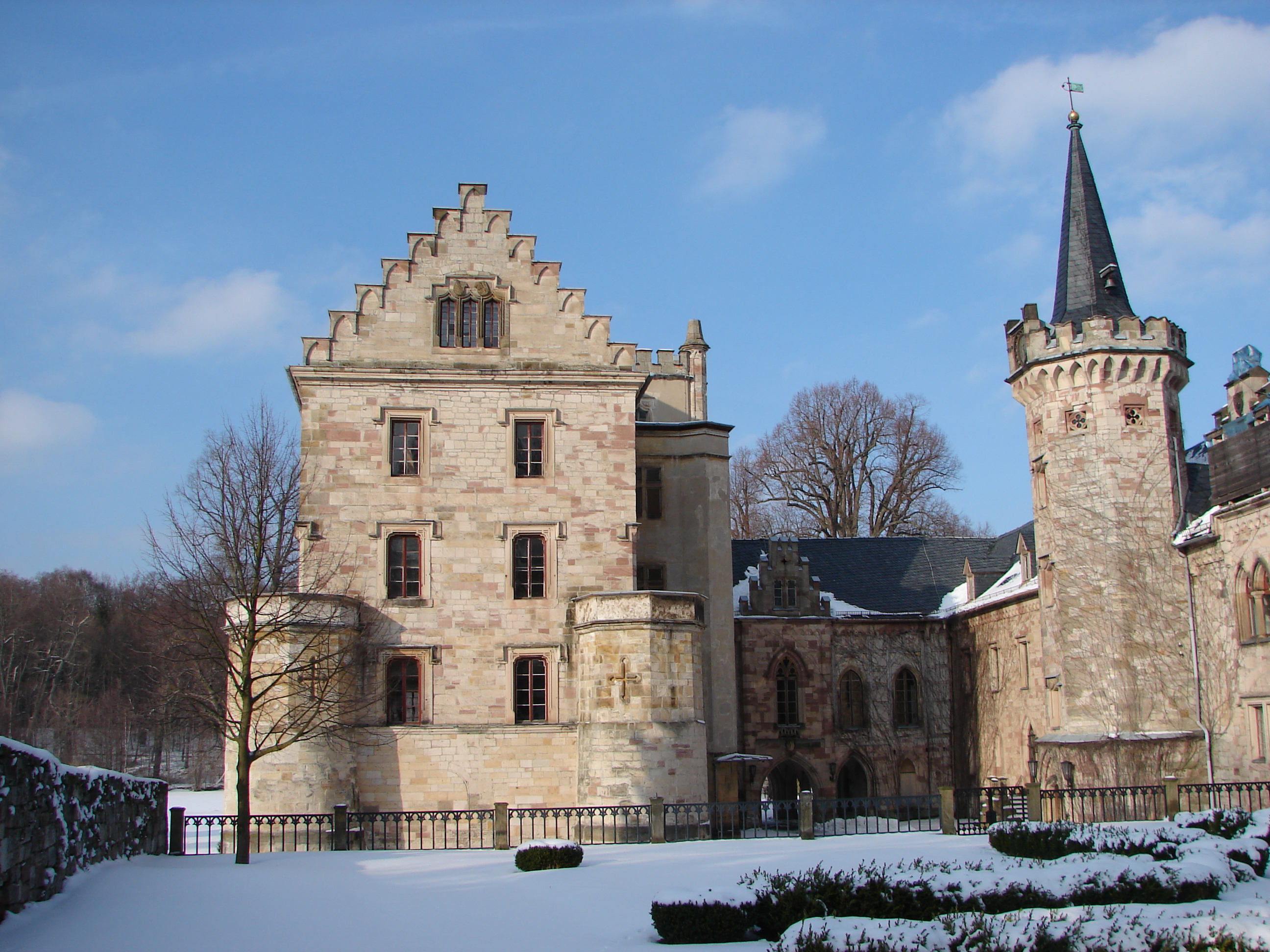
Reinhardsbrunn Castle, Gotha

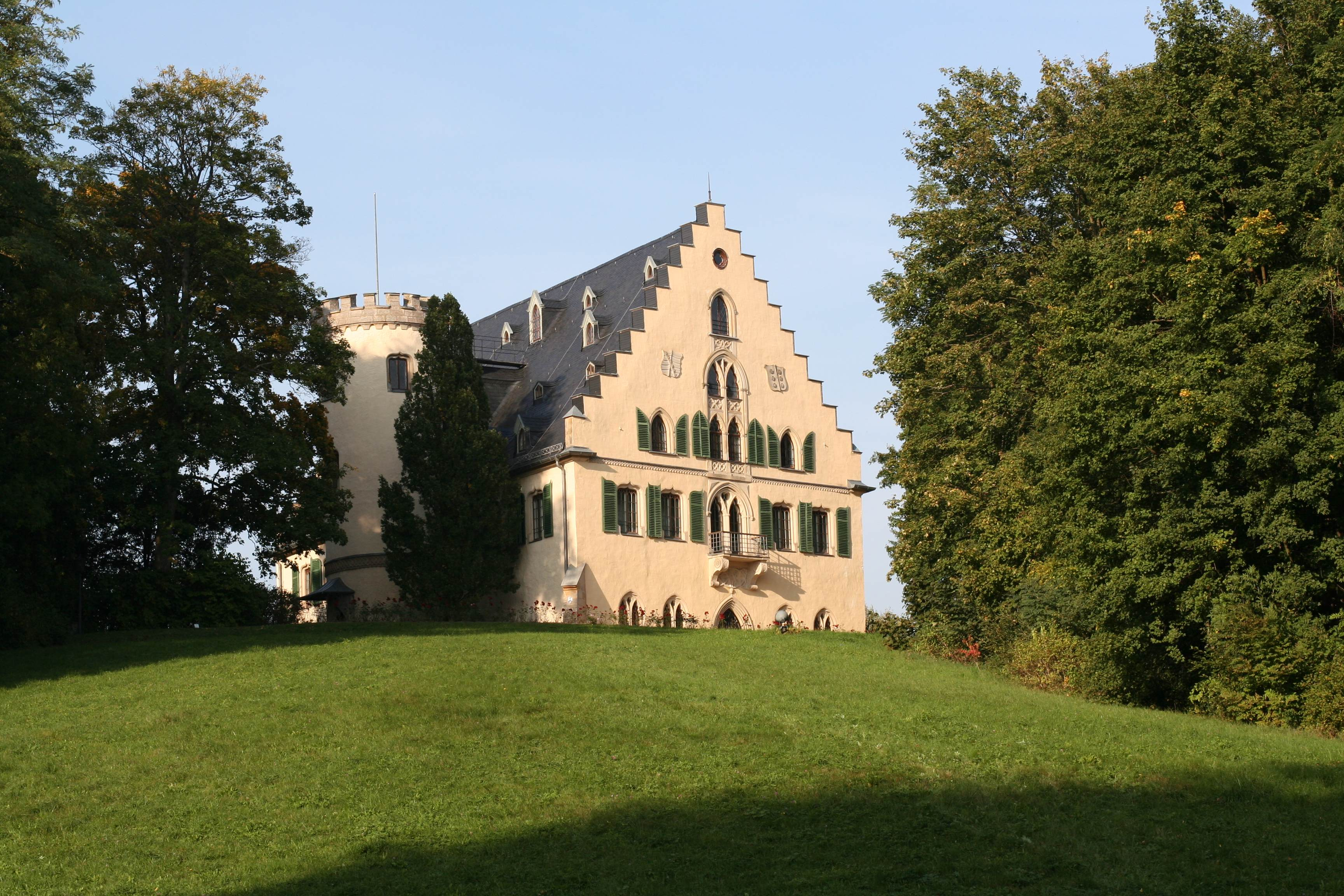
Rosenau Castle, Coburg

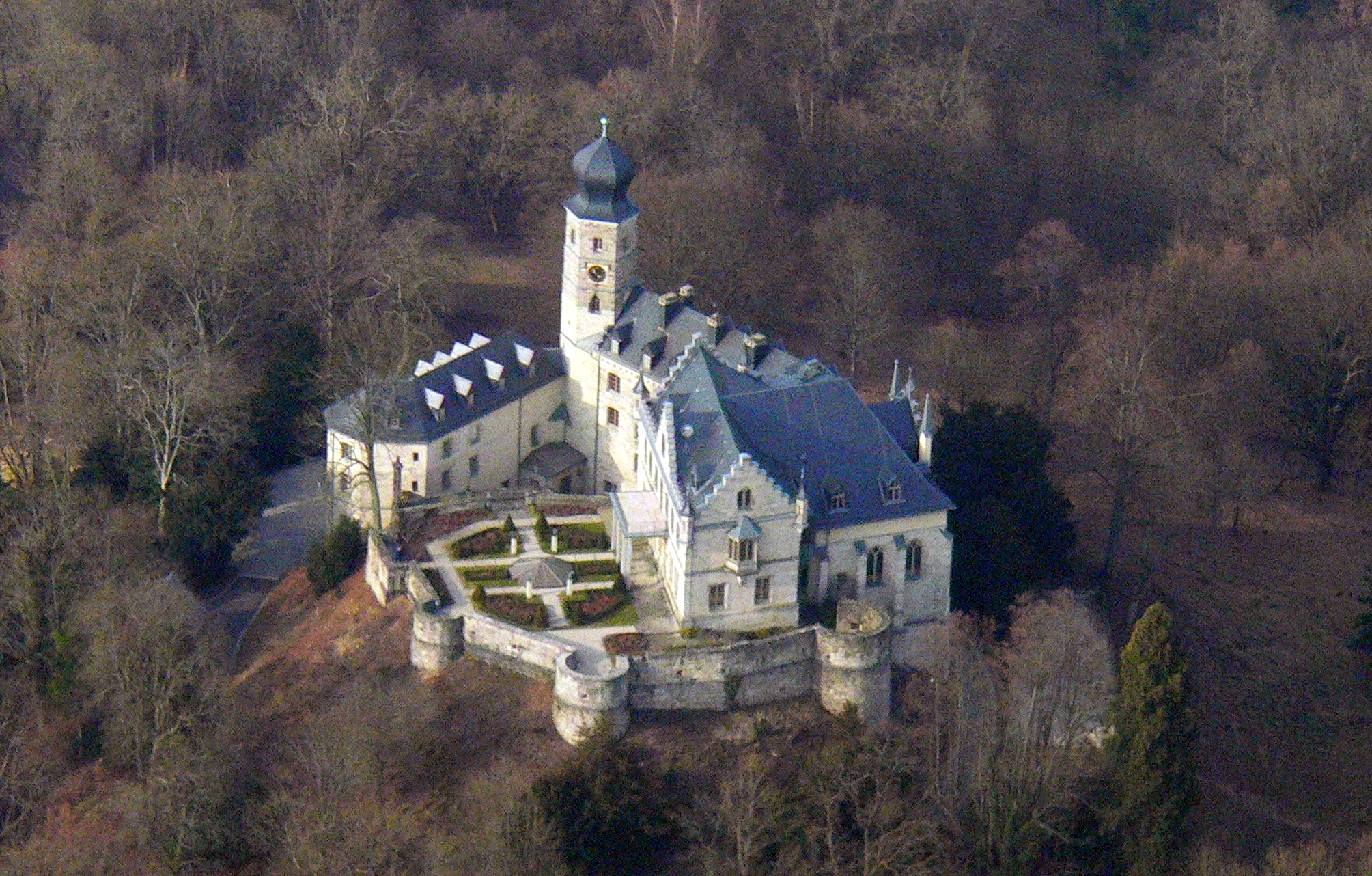
Callenberg Castle, Coburg

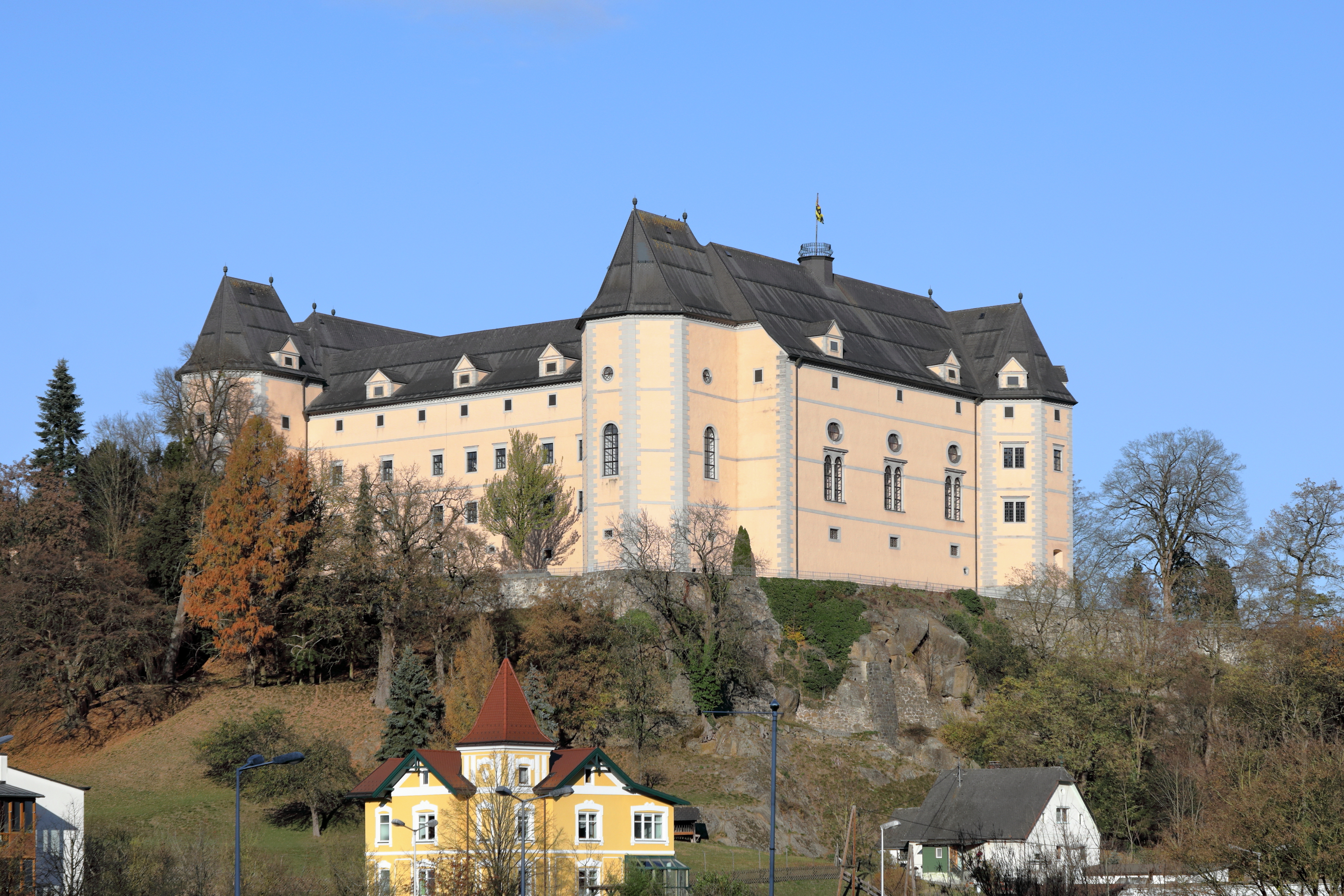
Greinburg Castle, Grein, Austria

=== Saxe-Coburg and Gotha-Koháry ===
The House of Saxe-Coburg and Gotha-Koháry is a Catholic cadet branch of the House of Saxe-Coburg and Gotha. It was founded with the marriage of Prince Ferdinand of Saxe-Coburg and Gotha, second son of Francis, Duke of Saxe-Coburg-Saalfeld, with Princess Maria Antonia Koháry de Csábrág. Their second son Prince August inherited the estates of the House of Koháry in Hungary and Austria. August's youngest son became Ferdinand I of Bulgaria.

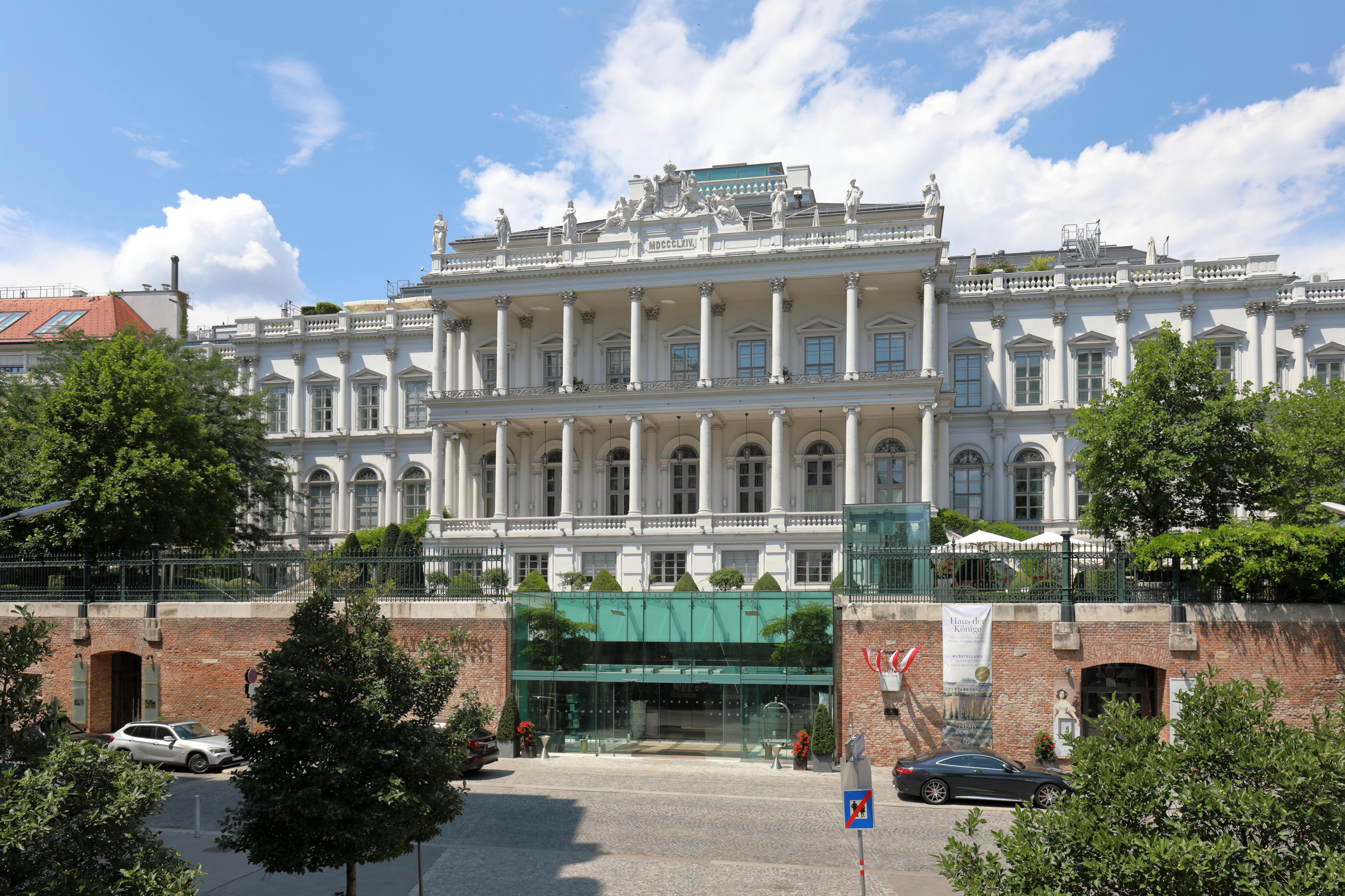
Palais Coburg in Vienna, today a hotel

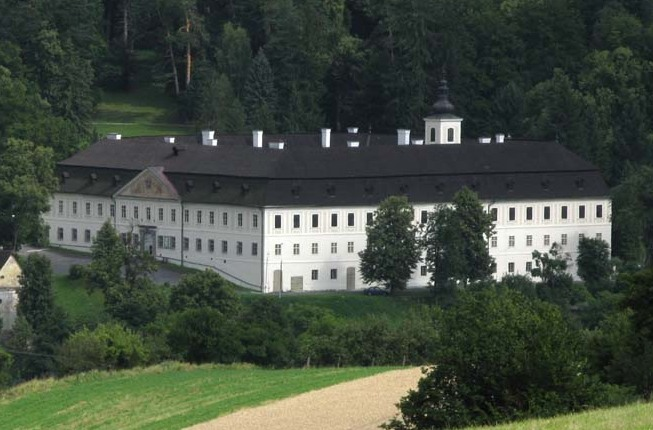
Palace of Svätý Anton in Slovakia, today a museum

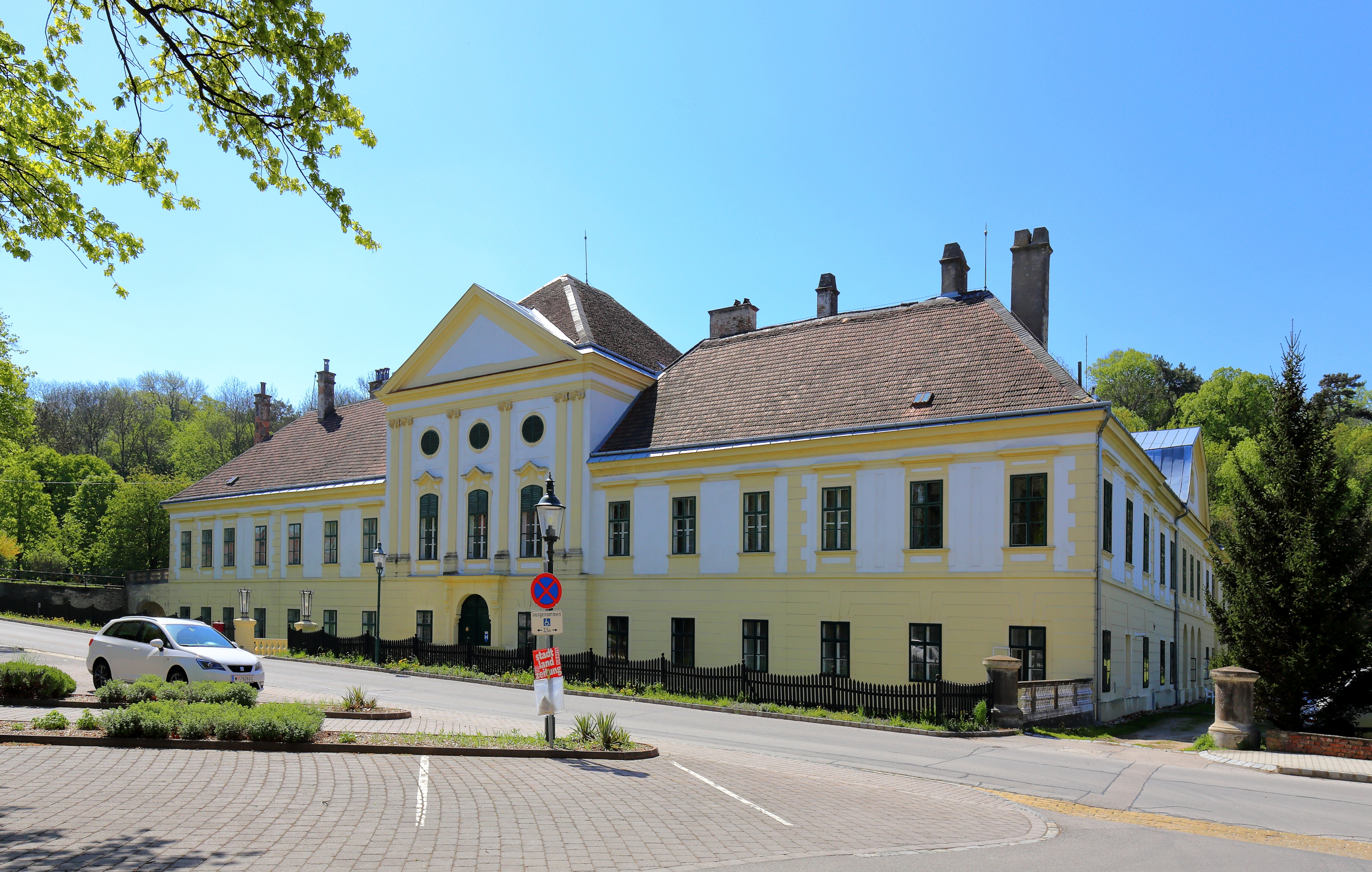
Ebenthal, Lower Austria, today private property

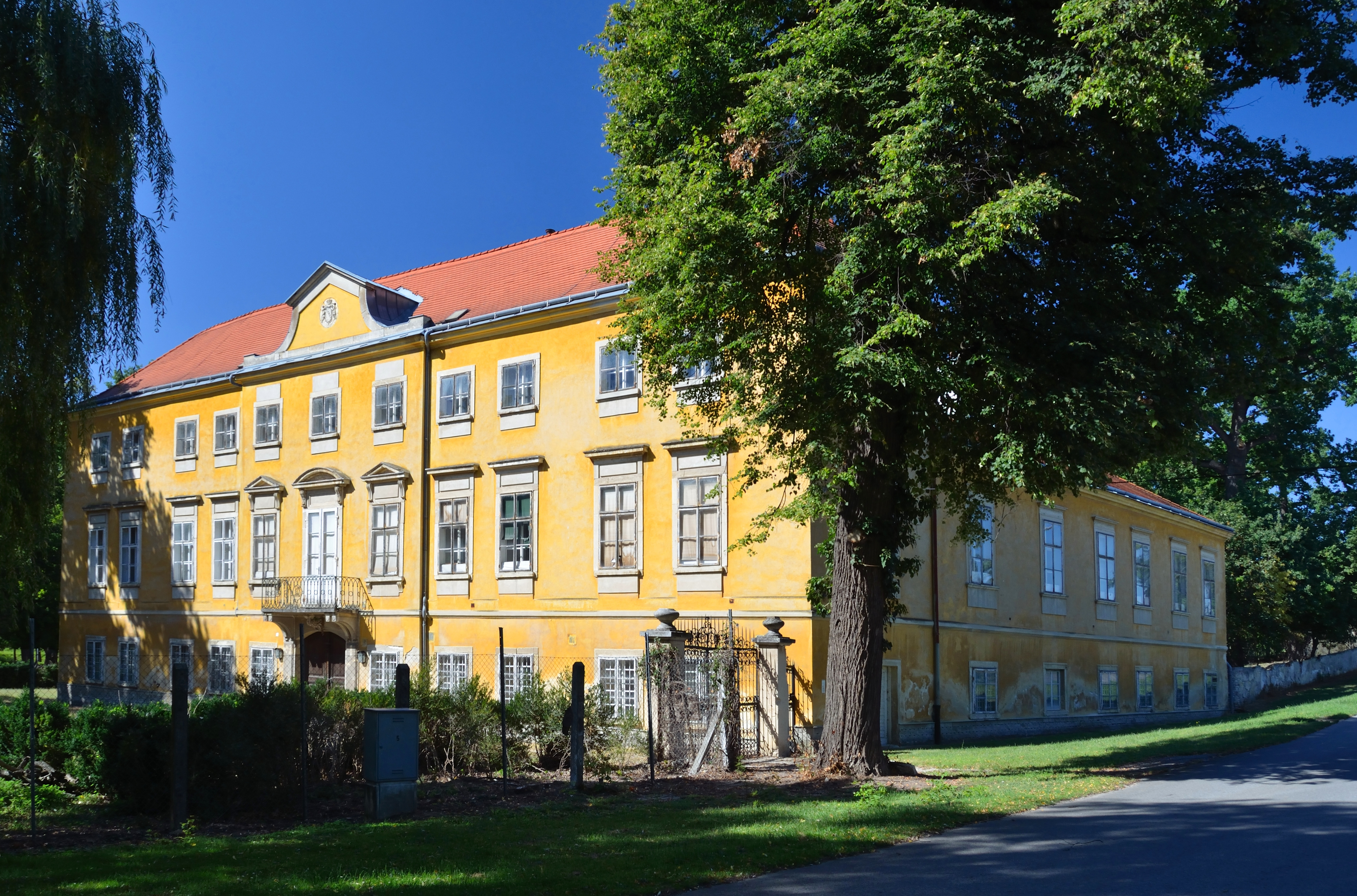
Walterskirchen castle near Poysdorf, Lower Austria is still owned by the family

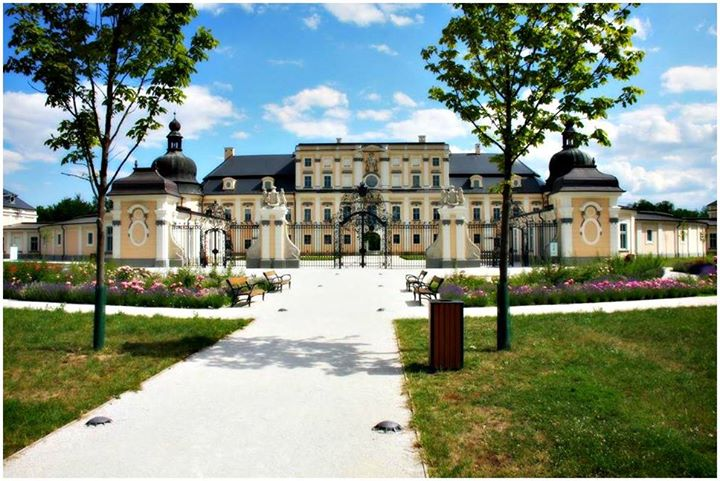
L'Huillier-Coburg Palace, acquired 1831, today owned by the Hungarian state

==== Kingdom of Portugal ====
Arms of Ferdinand II of Portugal of the House of Saxe-Coburg and Gotha

The Portuguese line was founded by Prince Ferdinand's eldest son, Ferdinand the younger, who married Queen Maria II of the House of Braganza and became king himself. It was overthrown in the Revolution of 1910, after which it became extinct in 1932 upon the death of Manuel II. Duarte Nuno of Braganza and his successors were descendants of the banished Miguelist line.

- Pedro V (1853–1861)
- Luís I (1861–1889)
- Carlos I (1889–1908)
- Manuel II (r. 1908–1910, d. 1932)
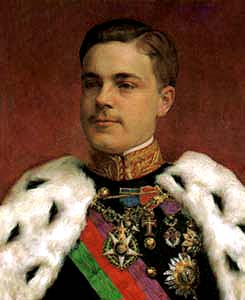
King Manuel II (r. 1908–1910, d. 1932)

==== Kingdom of Bulgaria ====
Arms of the Tsars of Bulgaria of the House of Saxe-Coburg and Gotha

From the accession of Boris III in 1918 onward, this branch of the family belongs to the Bulgarian Orthodox Church.

- Ferdinand I (1887–1918)
- Boris III (1918–1943)
- Simeon II (1943–1946) – in 2001, elected Prime Minister of Bulgaria as Simeon Saxe-Coburg-Gotha, also known as Simeon "Sakskoburggotski" (Сакскобургготски).
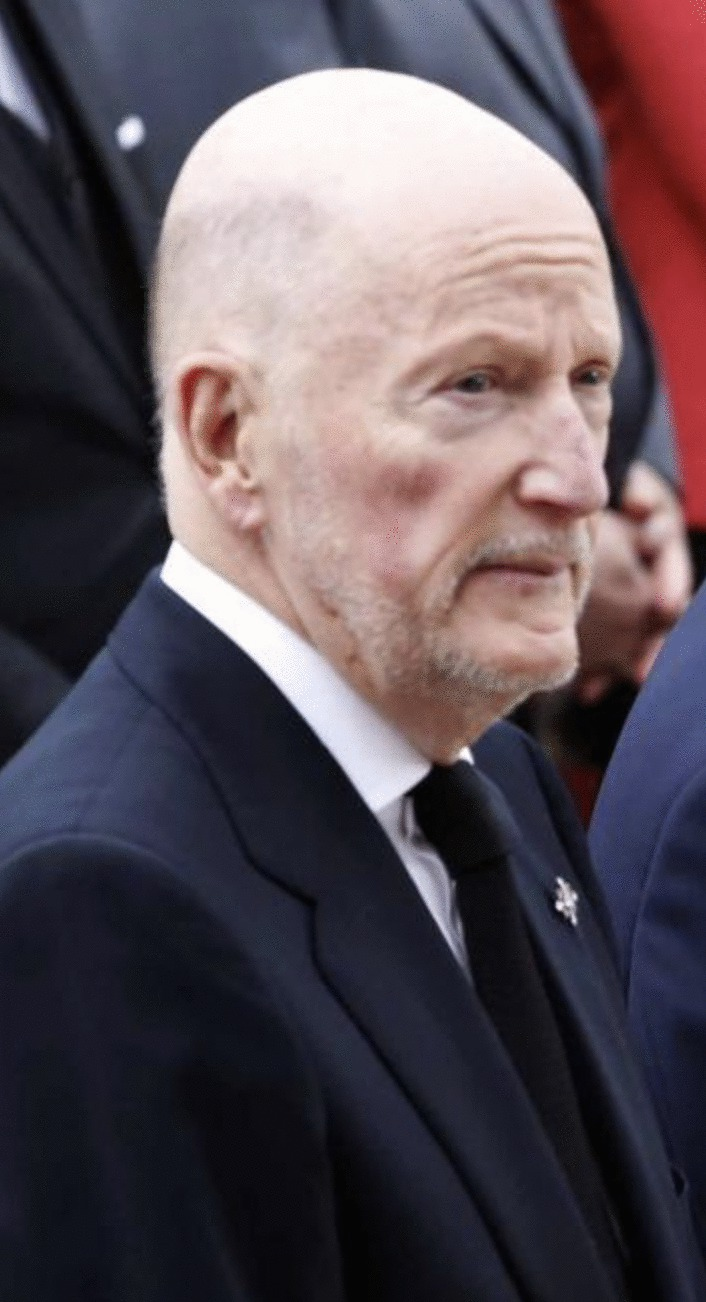
King Simeon II of Bulgaria (r. 1943–1946)

=== Kings of the Belgians ===
Arms of the Kings of the Belgians of the House of Saxe-Coburg and Gotha, 2019 version

The Belgian line was founded by Leopold, youngest son of Francis, Duke of Saxe-Coburg-Saalfeld. Following Leopold's conversion to Catholicism to take the newly created Belgian throne, this line of the house is predominantly Catholic.

- Leopold I (1831–1865)
- Leopold II (1865–1909)
- Albert I (1909–1934)
- Leopold III (1934–1951)
- Baudouin (1951–1993)
- Albert II (1993–2013)
- Philippe (2013–present)

==== Belgian royal house ====
Because of the First World War, the title of the family was unofficially changed in 1920 or 1921 to "of Belgium", and the armorial bearings of Saxony were removed from the Belgian royal coat of arms. Since the 2017 Carnet Mondain, the title "Saxe-Cobourg-Gotha" is again in use for all the descendants of Leopold I, with the exception of King Philippe, his wife, his sister and his brother who keep their title "of Belgium"; therefore the descendants of Astrid of Belgium do not bear this title, but that of "of Austria-Este" of their father. The armorial bearing of Saxony was put back in 2019.

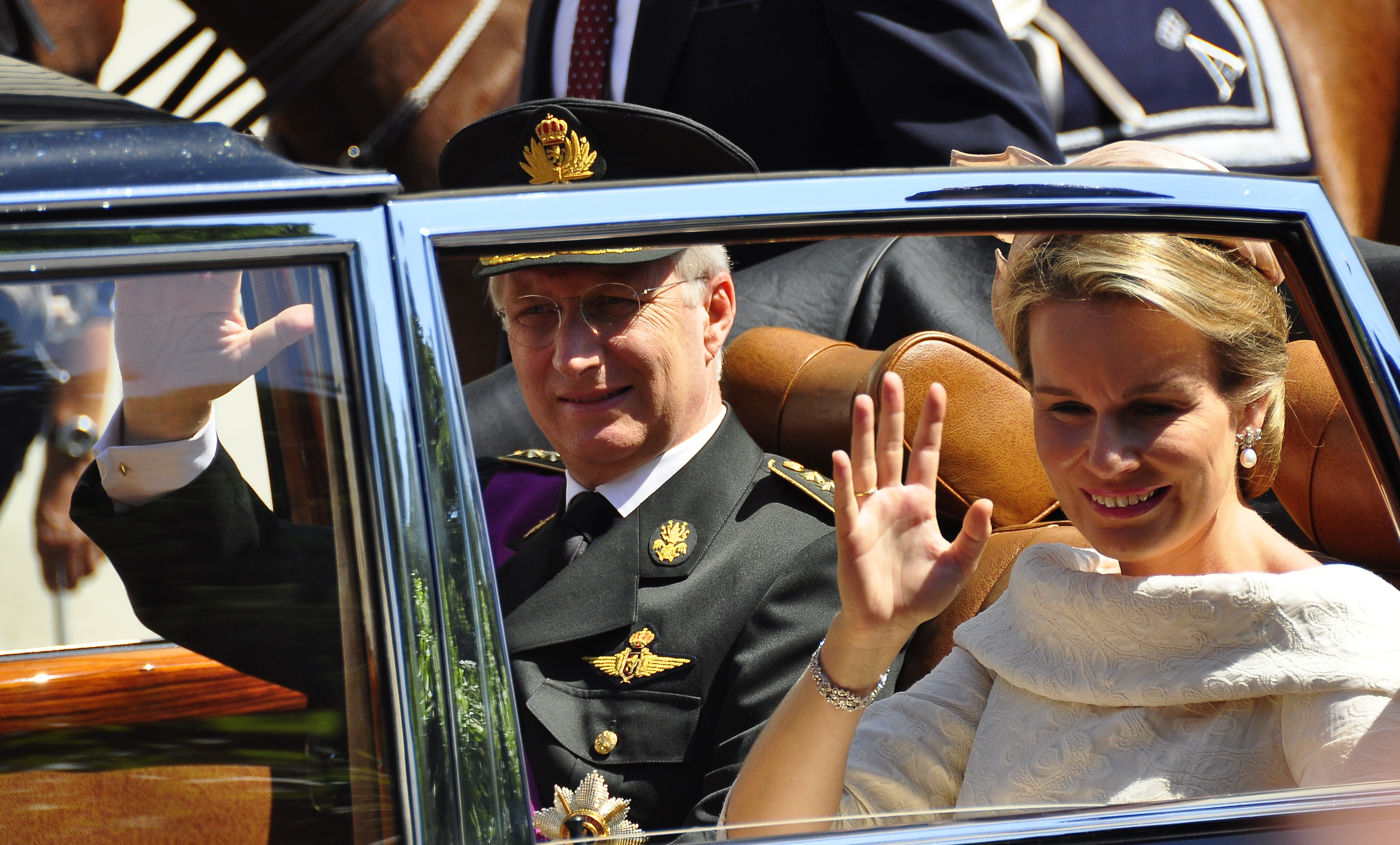
King Philippe of Belgium and Queen Mathilde of Belgium

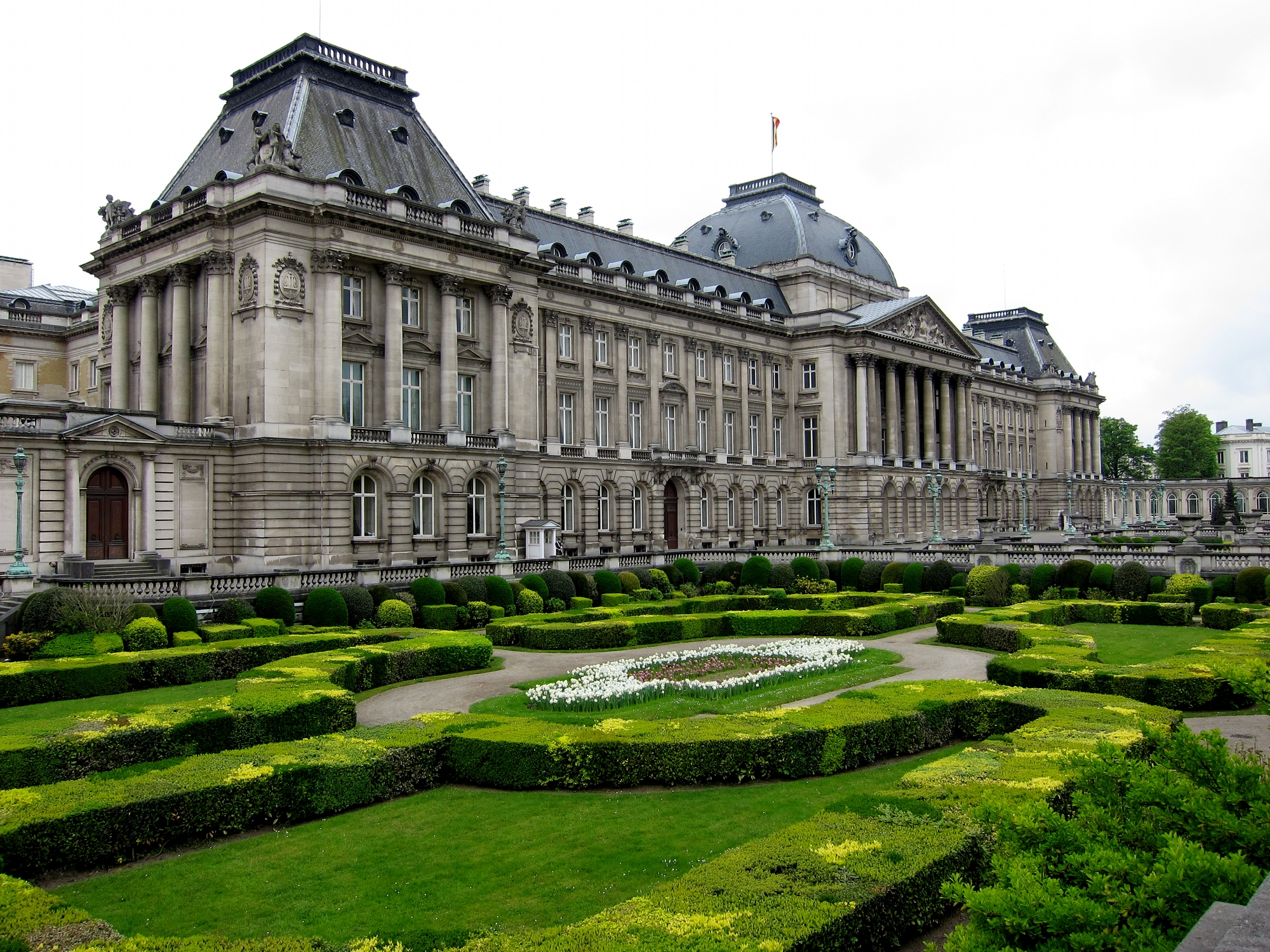
Royal Palace of Brussels

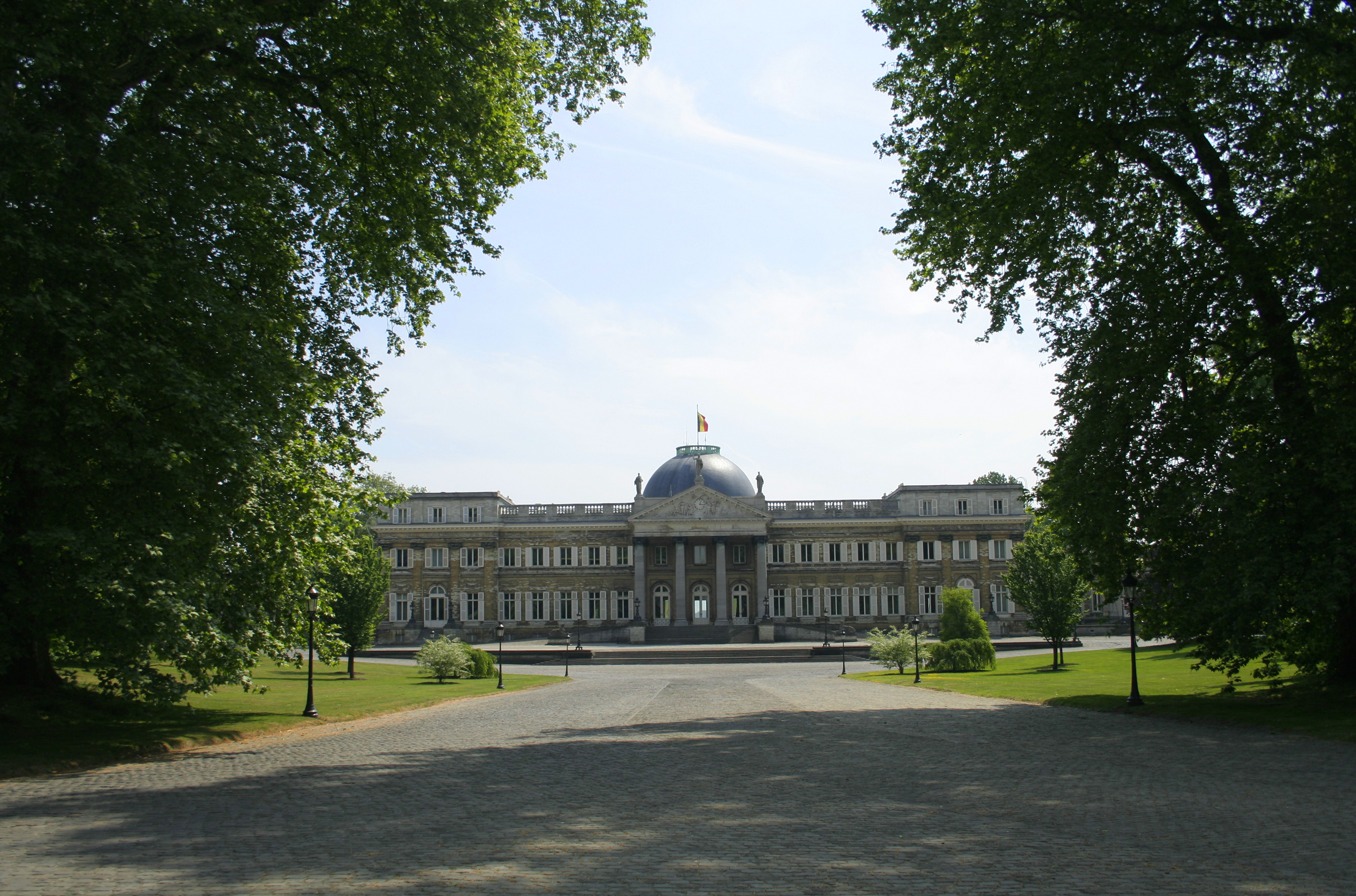
Royal Castle of Laeken

=== United Kingdom ===
Arms of Edward of Saxe-Coburg-Gotha, Prince of Wales, the first "Coburgian" to become King of the United Kingdom and Ireland as Edward VII in 1901

The British line was founded by King Edward VII, eldest son of Queen Victoria and Prince Albert of Saxe-Coburg and Gotha. His successor and son, King George V, changed the name of this line of the royal house and family to Windsor in 1917.

- Edward VII (1901–1910)
- George V (1910–1917)
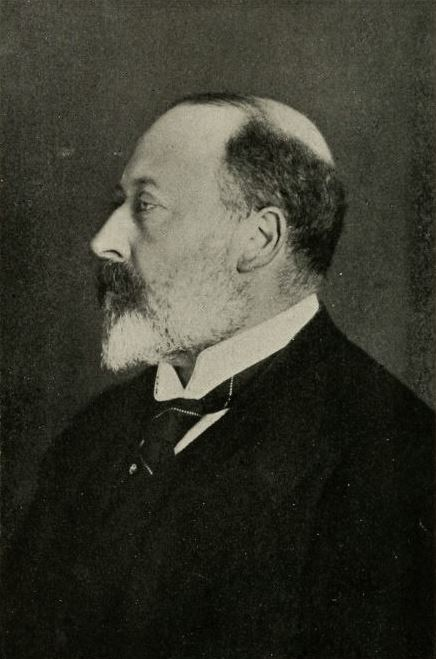
King Edward VII (r. 1901–1910)

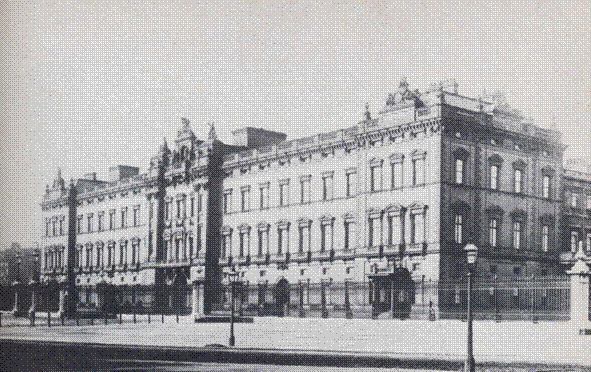
Buckingham Palace in 1910

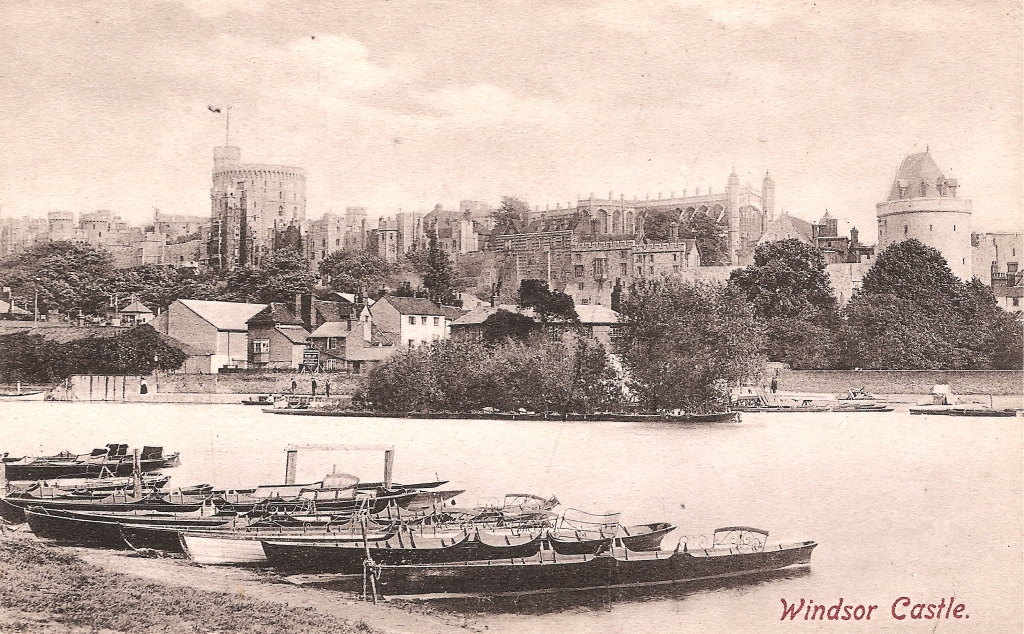
Windsor Castle in 1907

== Genealogy ==
Patrilineality, descent as reckoned from father to son, had historically been the principle determining membership in reigning families until the late 20th century, thus the dynasty to which the monarchs of the House of Saxe-Coburg-Gotha belonged genealogically throughout the 1900s is the House of Wettin, despite the official use of varying names by different branches of the patriline.

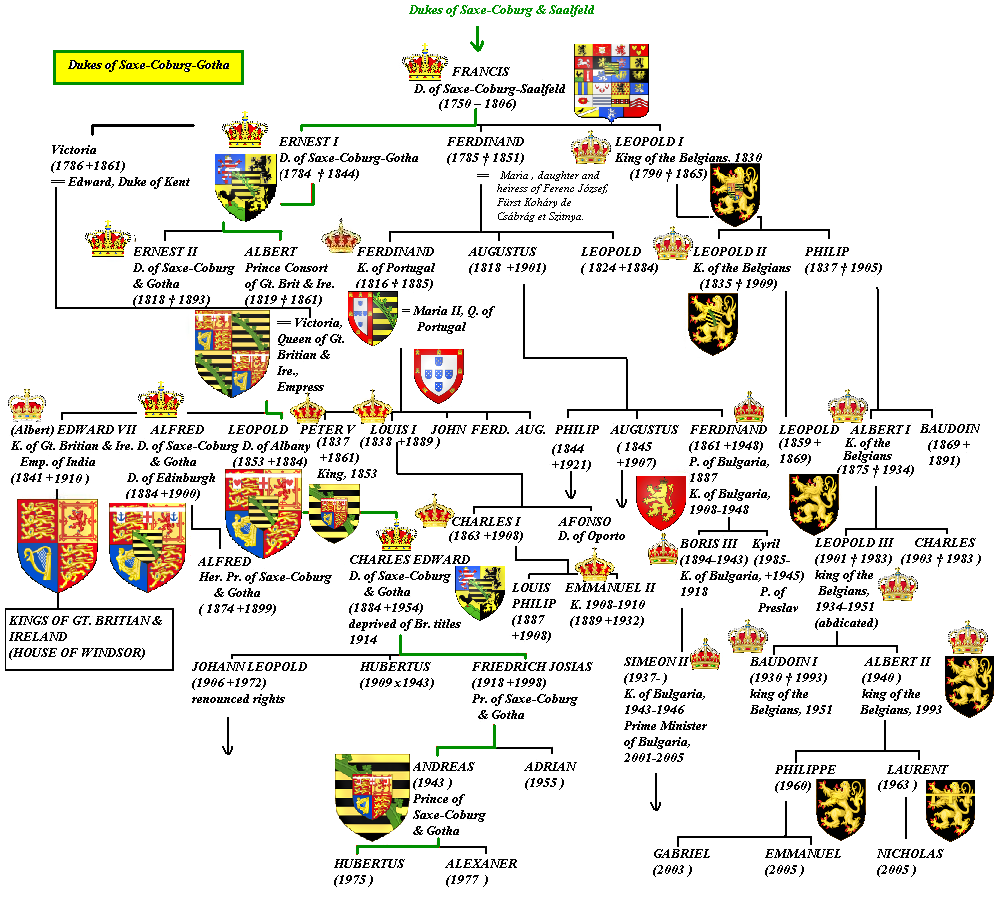
Saxe-Coburg Dynasty Family Tree since the end of the 18th century, showing their male inheritance of the thrones of Great Britain, Belgium, Portugal, and Bulgaria.

Royal house House of Saxe-Coburg and Gotha Cadet branch of the House of Wettin
New title	Ruling house of the Duchy of Saxe-Coburg and Gotha; 1826–1918	Duchy Abolished
New title	Ruling house of the Kingdom of Belgium; 1831–present	Incumbent
Preceded by House of Braganza	Ruling house of the Kingdom of Portugal (Ruled under the name House of Braganza); 1853–1910	Monarchy Abolished
Preceded by House of Battenberg	Ruling house of the Kingdom of Bulgaria; 1887–1946	Monarchy Abolished
Preceded by House of Hanover	Ruling house of the United Kingdom (Renamed House of Windsor by Royal Proclamation of 17 July 1917); 1901–1917	Succeeded by House of Windsor
