= Duke Maximilian Emanuel in Bavaria =

Bavarian royal (1849–1893)

Maximilian Emanuel
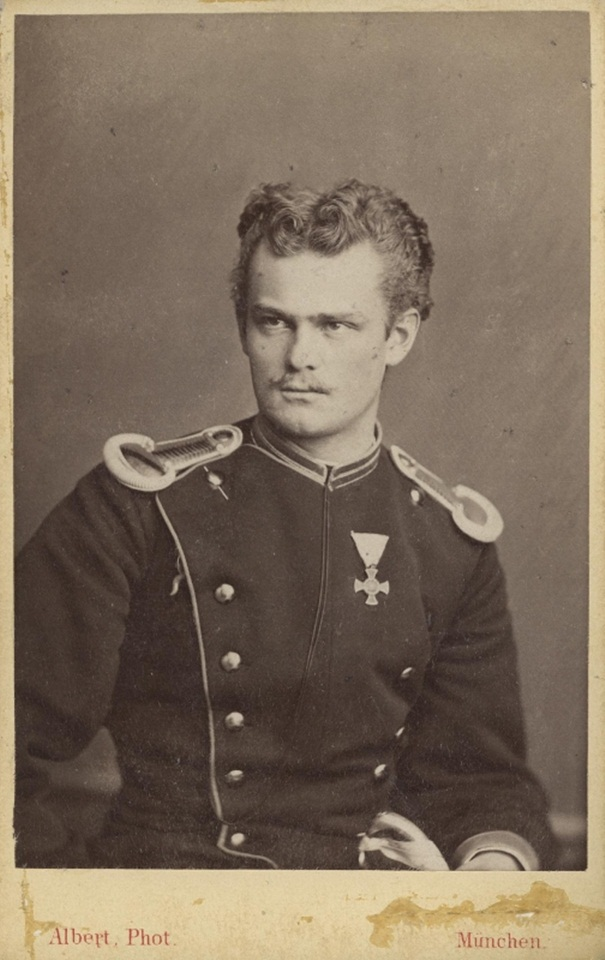
- Maximilian Emanuel c. 1870
- Born: 7 December 1849; Munich, Kingdom of Bavaria
- Died: 12 June 1893 (aged 43); Feldafing, Kingdom of Bavaria
- Spouse: Princess Amalie of Saxe-Coburg and Gotha (m. 1875)
- Issue: Duke Siegfried; Duke Christoph; Duke Luitpold
Names
- German: Maximilian Emanuel
- House: Wittelsbach
- Father: Duke Maximilian Joseph in Bavaria
- Mother: Princess Ludovika of Bavaria

Duke Maximilian Emanuel in Bavaria (7 December 1849 – 12 June 1893) was a German prince of the House of Wittelsbach, and the younger brother of Elisabeth of Bavaria. He married Princess Amalie of Saxe-Coburg and Gotha in 1875 and had three sons with her.

== Biography ==
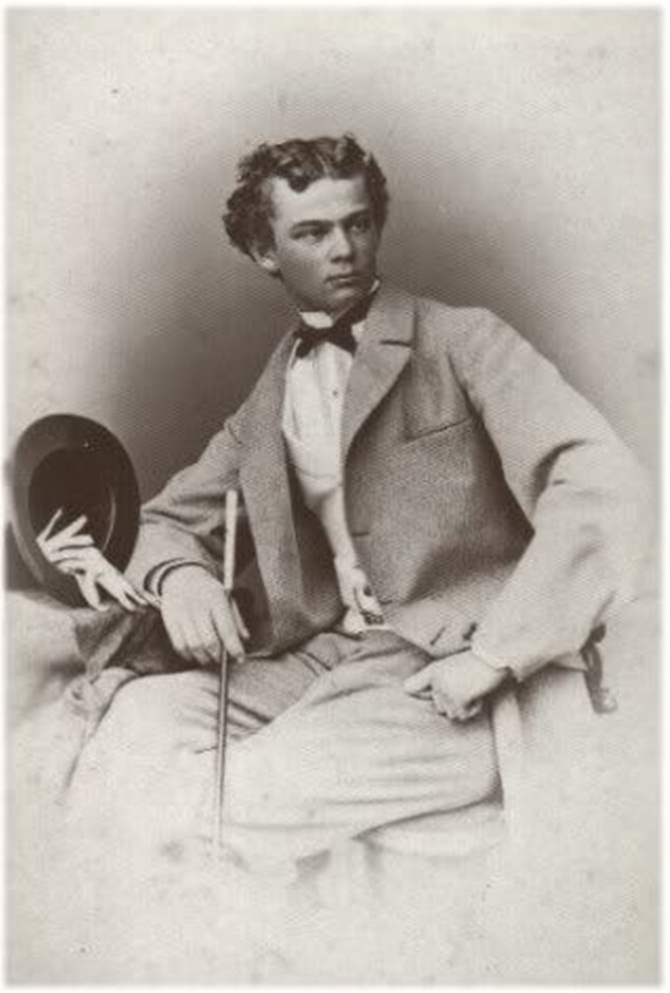
Duke Maximilian Emanuel in Bavaria

Born on 7 December 1849 in Munich, Maximilian Emanuel was the tenth and youngest child of Duke Maximilian Joseph in Bavaria and Princess Ludovika of Bavaria. He expressed an interest in the army at a young age, becoming a second lieutenant in the 2nd Royal Bavarian Uhlans in 1865. He participated in the War of 1866 on the side of Austria, fighting in the battles of Hünfeld and Hammelburg.

Maximilian Emanuel developed severe gastric bleeding in 1893, dying in June of that year.

== Marriage and issue ==
Maximilian Emanuel married Princess Amalie of Saxe-Coburg and Gotha, fourth child and second eldest daughter of Prince August of Saxe-Coburg and Gotha and his wife Princess Clémentine of Orléans, on 20 September 1875 in Ebenthal, Lower Austria. Maximilian Emanuel and Amalie had three sons:

- Duke Siegfried August in Bavaria (10 July 1876 – 12 March 1952)
- Duke Christoph Joseph Klemens Maria in Bavaria (22 April 1879 – 10 July 1963). He was married to Anna Sibig (18 July 1874 – 1 January 1958)
- Duke Luitpold Emanuel Ludwig Maria in Bavaria (30 June 1890 – 16 January 1973)

== Honours ==
He received the following orders and decorations:

- Kingdom of Bavaria:
  - Knight of St. Hubert
  - Commander of the Military Merit Order
- Brunswick: Grand Cross of Henry the Lion
- Mecklenburg-Schwerin: Military Merit Cross, 2nd Class
- Austria-Hungary: Knight of the Golden Fleece, 1875
- Kingdom of Prussia:
  - Knight of the Black Eagle, 11 September 1872
  - Iron Cross (1870), 2nd Class
- (Saxe-Coburg and Gotha) (Duchy of Saxe-Altenburg) (Saxe-Meiningen) Ernestine duchies: Grand Cross of the Saxe-Ernestine House Order, 1875

== Ancestry ==
Ancestors of Duke Maximilian Emanuel in Bavaria

8. Duke Wilhelm in Bavaria
4. Duke Pius August in Bavaria
9. Countess Palatine Maria Anna of Zweibrücken-Birkenfeld
2. Duke Maximilian Joseph in Bavaria
10. Prince Louis of Arenberg
5. Princess Amélie Louise of Arenberg
11. Marie Adélaïde Julie de Mailly-Nesle
1. Duke Maximilian Emanuel in Bavaria
12. Frederick Michael, Count Palatine of Zweibrücken
6. Maximilian I Joseph of Bavaria
13. Countess Palatine Maria Franziska of Sulzbach
3. Princess Ludovika of Bavaria
14. Charles Louis, Hereditary Prince of Baden
7. Princess Caroline of Baden
15. Princess Amalie of Hesse-Darmstadt
