= Duke Siegfried August in Bavaria =

Duke in Bavaria (1876–1952)

Duke Siegfried August
- Duke in Bavaria
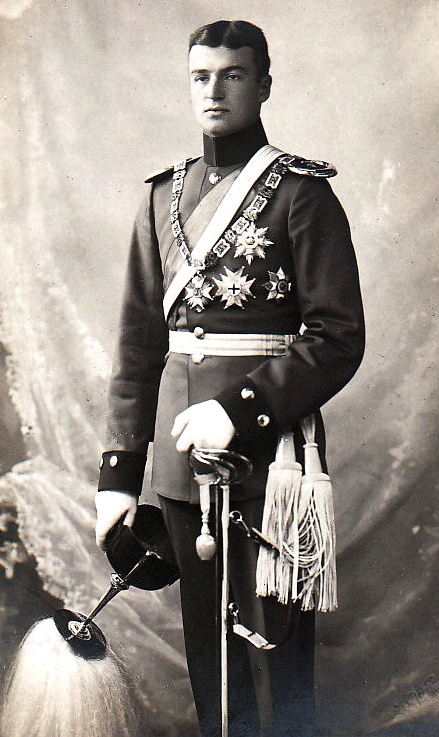
- Siegfried in 1898.
- Born: 10 July 1876; Bamberg, Kingdom of Bavaria
- Died: 12 March 1952 (aged 75); Munich, West Germany
Names
- German: Siegfried August Maximilian Maria
- House: Wittelsbach
- Father: Duke Maximilian Emanuel in Bavaria
- Mother: Princess Amalie of Saxe-Coburg and Gotha

Duke Siegfried in Bavaria (10 July 1876 – 12 March 1952) was a Duke in Bavaria and member of the House of Wittelsbach. He was the first of three sons of Duke Maximilian Emanuel in Bavaria and Princess Amalie of Saxe-Coburg and Gotha. Siegfried August was the brother of Christoph and Luitpold, Duke in Bavaria.

== Family and early life ==
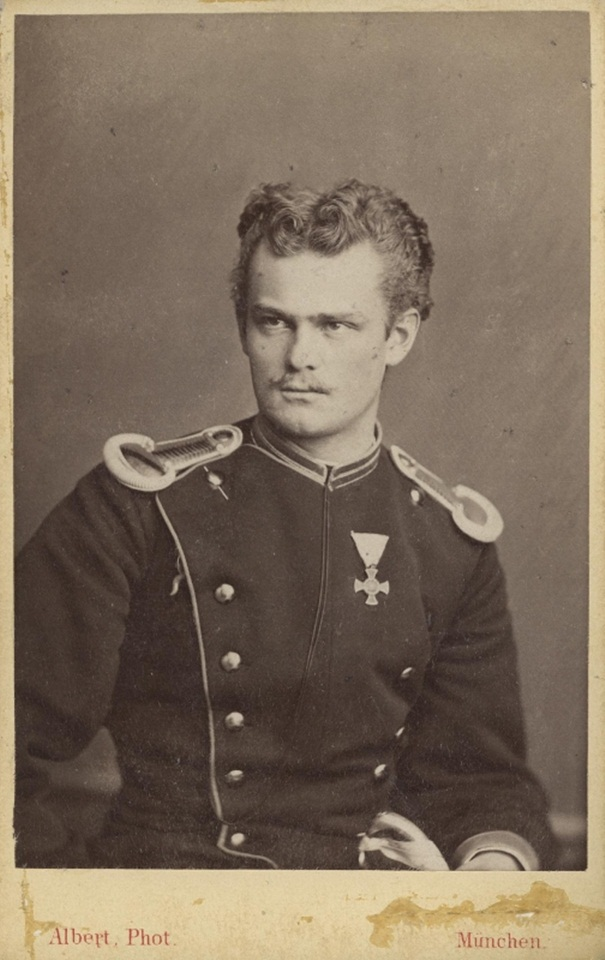
Siegfried's father, Duke Max Emanuel in Bayern

Duke Siegfried was the eldest son of Duke Maximilian Emanuel in Bavaria and his wife Amalie, who was a sister of Prince Philip of Coburg and of Prince Ferdinand of Bulgaria. Siegfried belonged to the Ducal or non-reigning branch of the ancient dynasty of Wittelsbach.

He was a notable steeplechase rider. When young, the Duke visited America, Japan, China and India, where he shot big game. On his way home paid a visit to Archduke Franz Ferdinand, heir apparent to the Austrian throne in Bohemia, who shared an interest in shooting big game.

== Failed Engagement ==
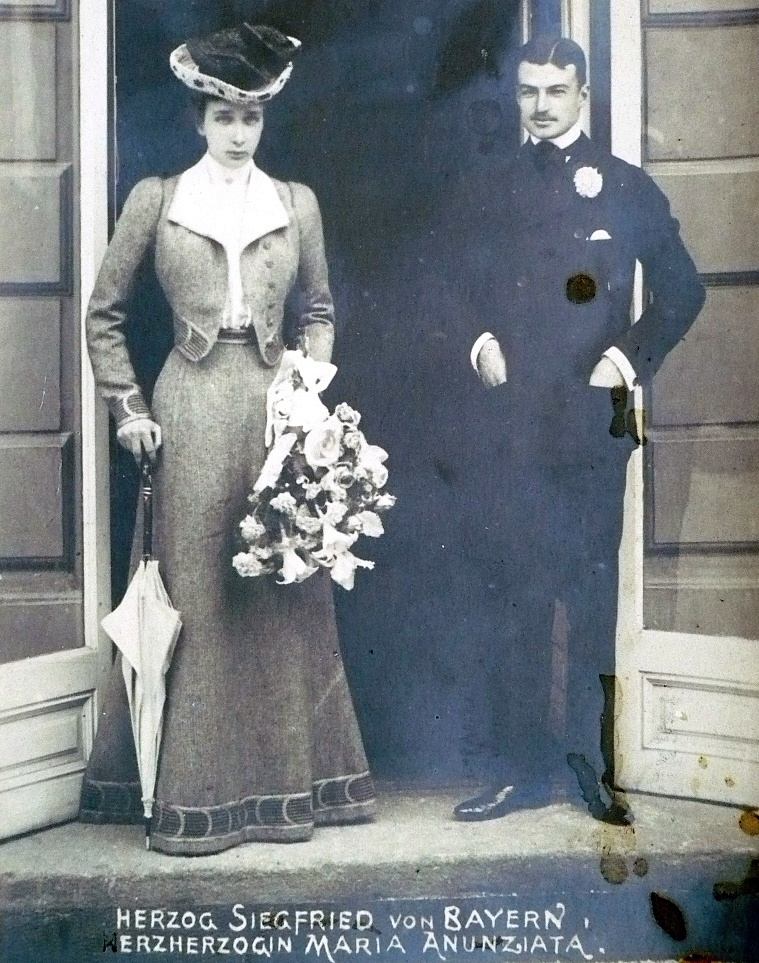
Duke Siegfried and his fiancée Archduchess Maria Annunciata

While staying with Archduke Franz Ferdinand of Austria, Siegfried met his host's unmarried half-sister, Archduchess Maria Annunciata, daughter of Archduchess Maria Theresa, and they became engaged. The engagement was broken off by the Archduchess two months later, in August 1902, owing to the personality change the Duke had suffered after a riding accident. The Archduchess appealed to the Emperor for permission to enter a canonry for daughters of aristocratic families (the Theresian Institution of Noble Ladies), yet without any vows, while the Duke became prey to melancholia, which in due course developed into insanity, rendering it necessary for his permanent confinement from 1906.

== Died ==
Duke Siegfried August in Bavaria died in Munich on 12 March 1952.

== Ancestry ==
Ancestors of Duke Siegfried August in Bavaria

8. Duke Pius August in Bavaria
4. Duke Maximilian Joseph in Bavaria
9. Princess Amélie Louise of Arenberg
2. Duke Maximilian Emanuel in Bavaria
10. Maximilian I Joseph of Bavaria
5. Princess Ludovika of Bavaria
11. Princess Caroline of Baden
1. Duke Siegfried August in Bavaria
12. Prince Ferdinand of Saxe-Coburg and Gotha
6. Prince August of Saxe-Coburg and Gotha
13. Princess Maria Antonia Koháry of Csábrág and Szitnya
3. Princess Amalie of Saxe-Coburg and Gotha
14. Louis Philippe I of France
7. Princess Clémentine of Orléans
15. Princess Maria Amalia of Naples and Sicily
