= Ebenthal, Lower Austria =

Ebenthal
- Municipality
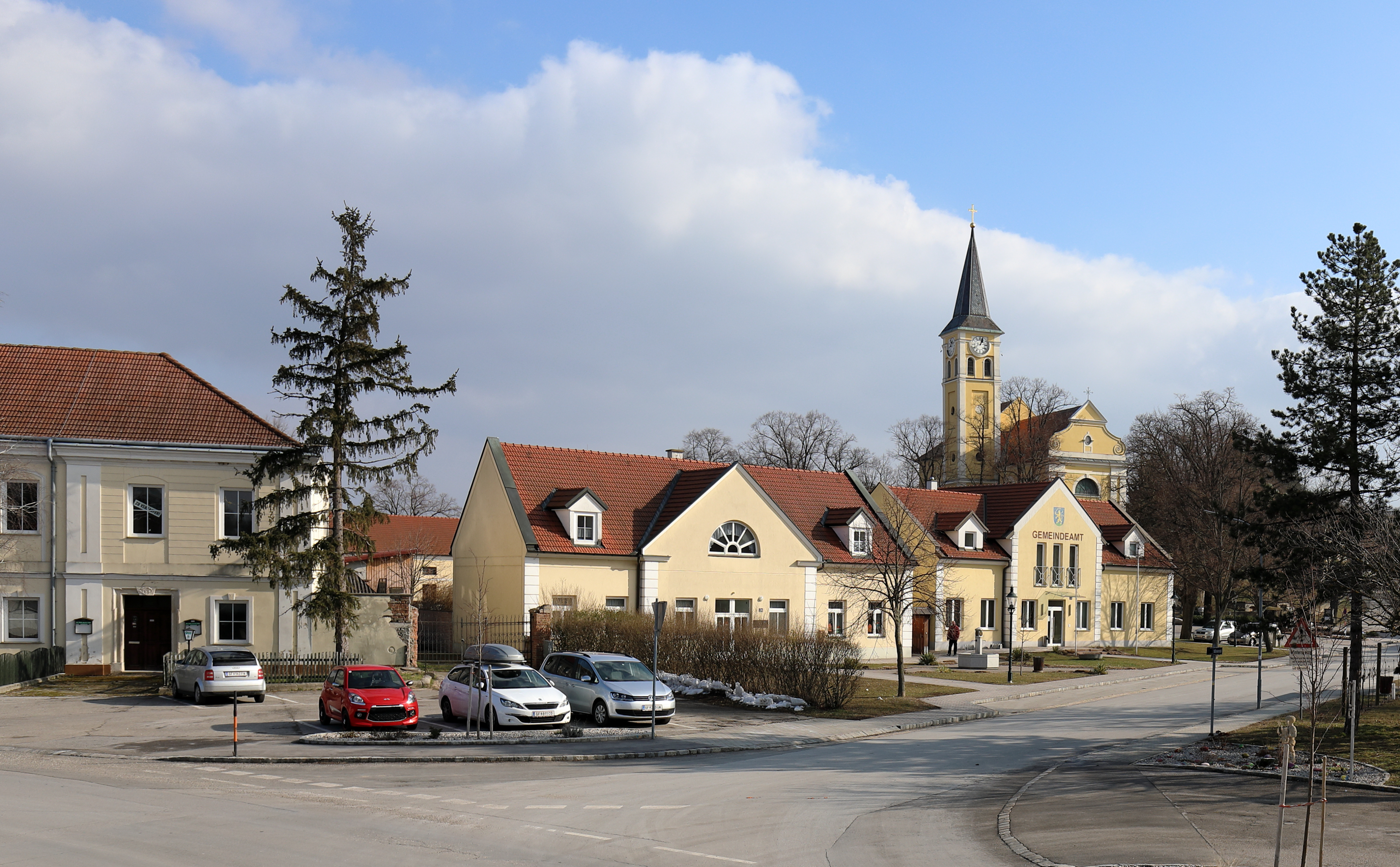
- Main square with parish church

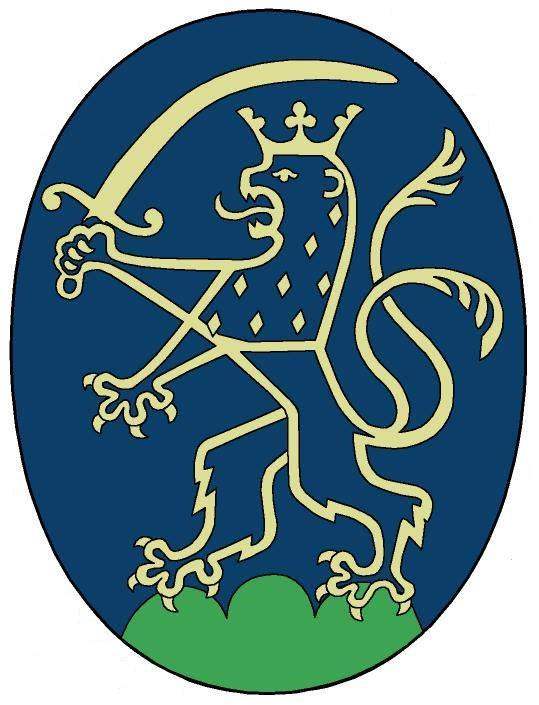
- Coat of arms

- Location within Austria
- Coordinates: 48°26′N 16°47′E
- Country: Austria
- State: Lower Austria
- District: Gänserndorf

Government
  - Mayor: Christoph Veit

Area
  - Total: 18.15 km^{2} (7.01 sq mi)
- Elevation: 176 m (577 ft)

Population (2018-01-01)
  - Total: 923
  - Density: 50.9/km^{2} (132/sq mi)
- Time zone: UTC+1 (CET)
  - Summer (DST): UTC+2 (CEST)
- Postal code: 2251
- Area code: 02538
- Website: www.ebenthal.at

Ebenthal is a town in the district of Gänserndorf in the Austrian state of Lower Austria.

== Geography ==
Ebenthal lies near Vienna in Lower Austria. About 40.22 percent of the municipality is forested.
