= The Visitation (MS) =

1506 painting by Master MS

- Vizitáció (Hungarian)
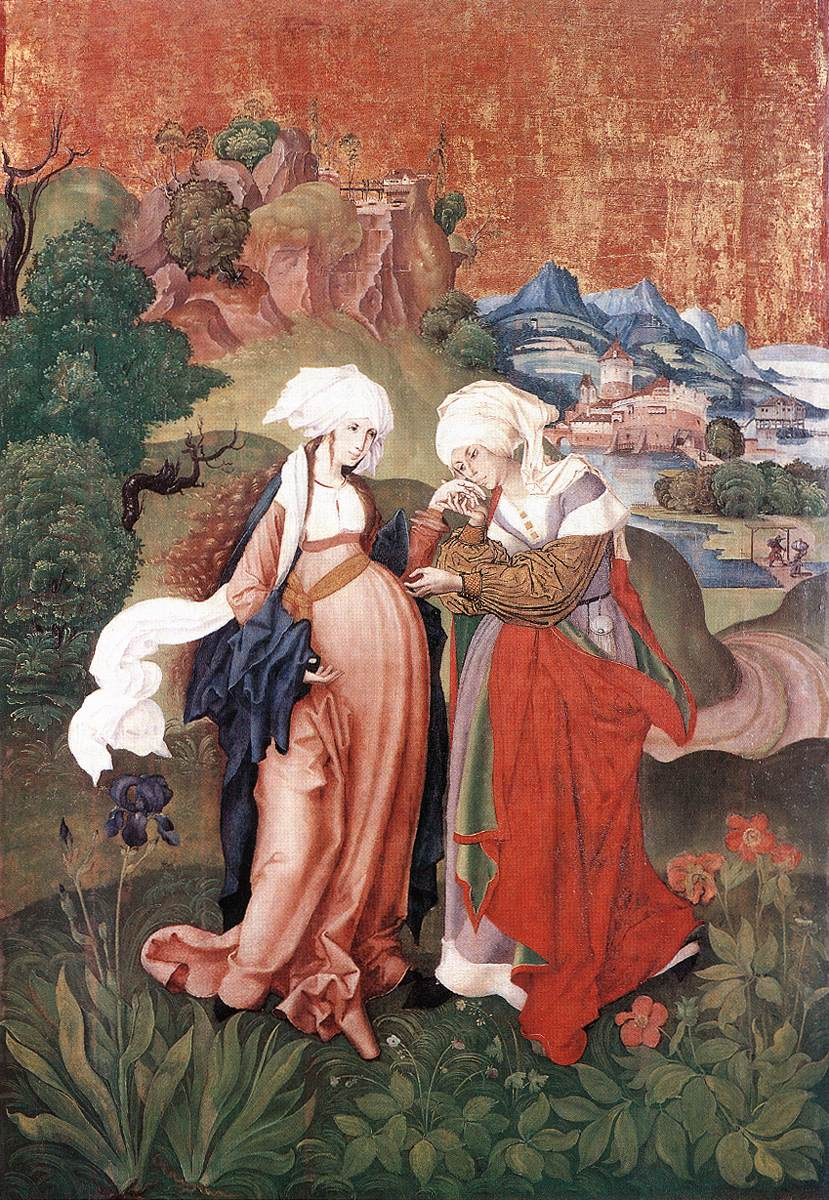
- Artist: Master MS
- Year: 1506
- Medium: tempera on panel
- Dimensions: 140 cm × 94.5 cm (55 in × 37.2 in); 140 x 94.5 cm
- Location: Hungarian National Gallery, Budapest

The Visitation (Hungarian: Vizitáció) is a 1506 panel painting by Hungarian painter known as Master MS in the collection of the Hungarian National Gallery in Budapest.

== Analysis ==
This medieval Hungarian painting shows the Visitation of St. Elisabeth and the Virgin Mary. All the natural elements that are depicted are in praise of the Lord. This idyll, however, is just an illusion - the bare rocks, twisted trees, beautiful and delicate flowers - iris, peony, strawberries in the foreground, are subtle symbols of the passion. Elizabeth makes homage to the Virgin Mary to show her devotion by slightly raising her left hand to kiss her. The painting once hung in the Church of Saint Catherine in Selmecbánya (today Banská Štiavnica, Slovakia). Other paintings from the altar of the church are kept in Lille, France, Svätý Anton in Slovakia and the Christian Museum in Esztergom, Hungary. The inscription has been identified as being the same as that on an altar dedicated to the Virgin Mary in Kraków. It is believed that MS was Marten Swarcz.

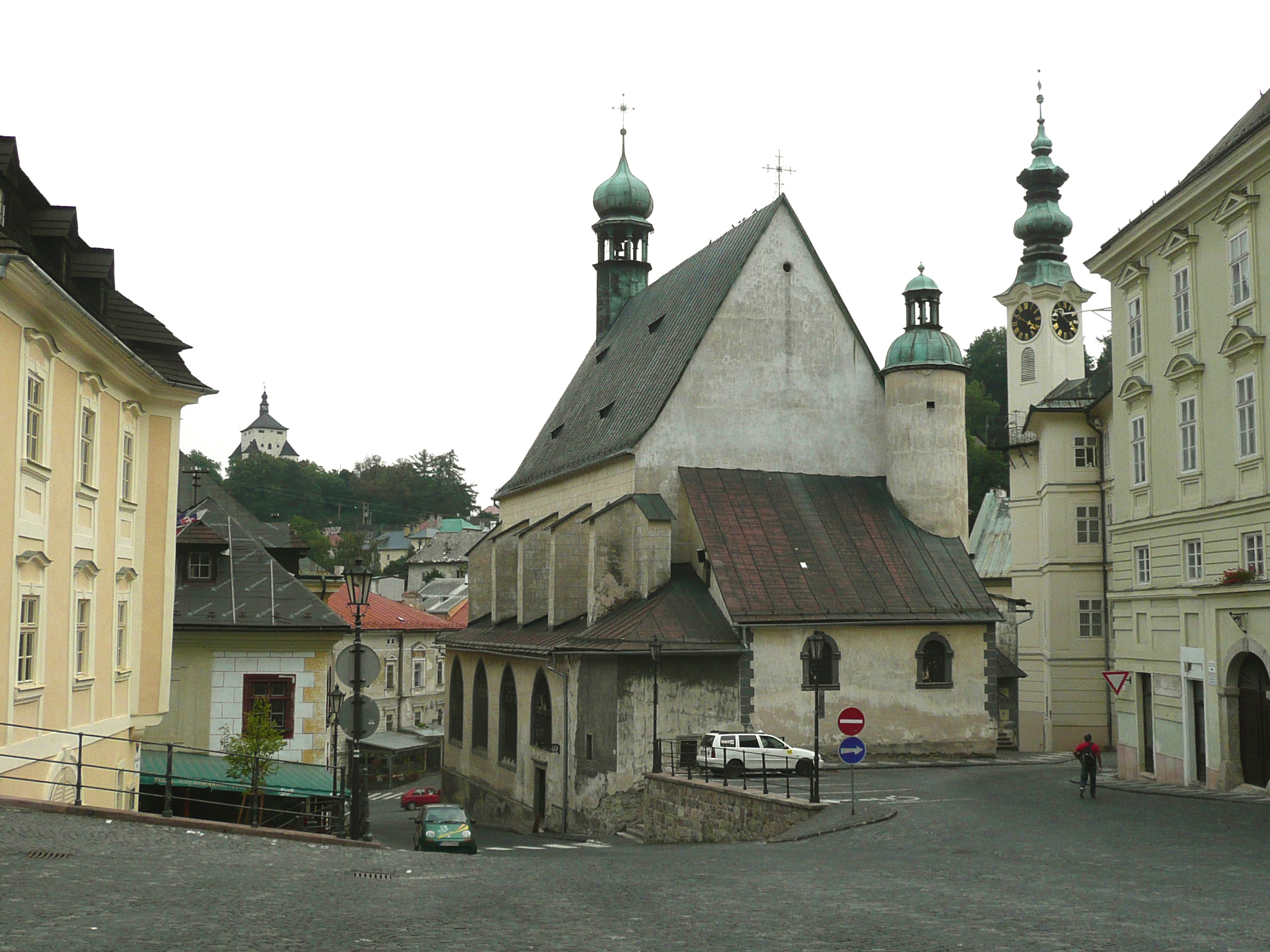
Church of St. Catherine, Banská Štiavnica

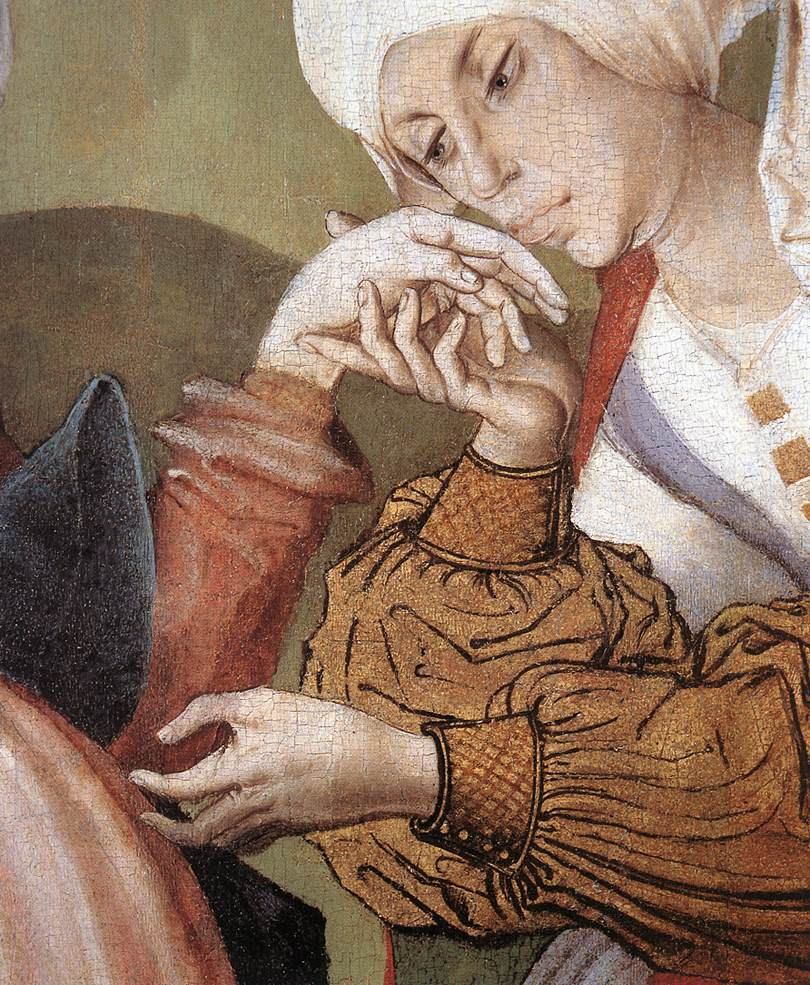
The Kiss, detail

== Others from the Church of St. Catherine ==
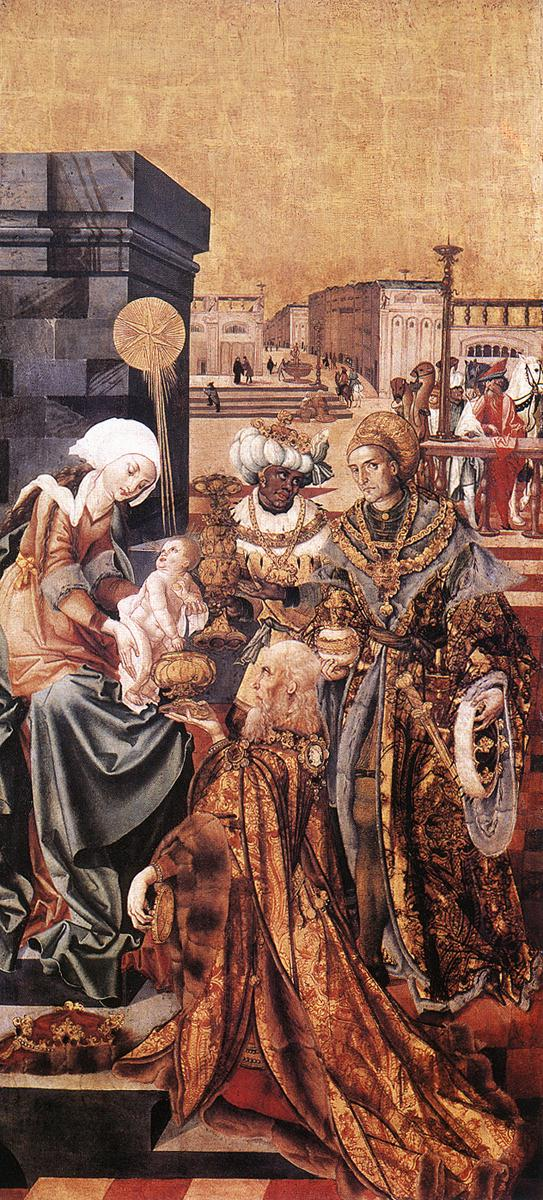
The Adoration of the Magi, Palais des Beaux-Arts de Lille

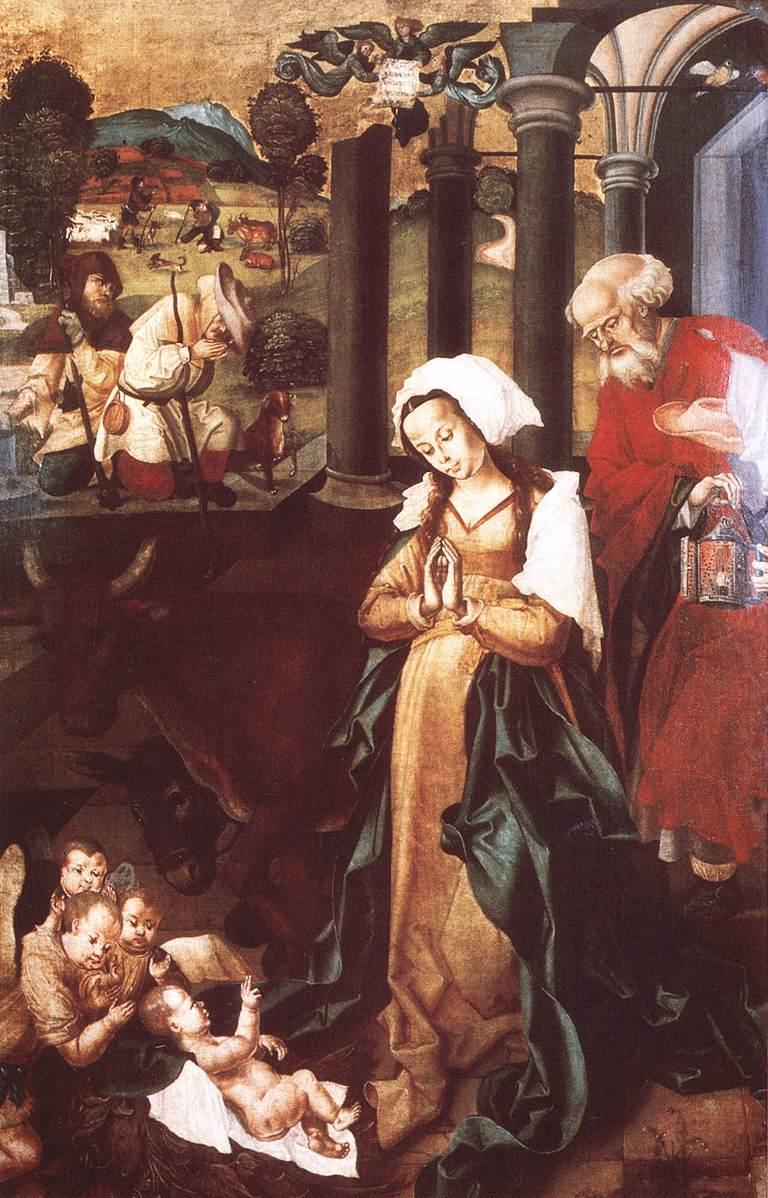
Birth of Jesus, Parish Church of Antol, Svätý Anton

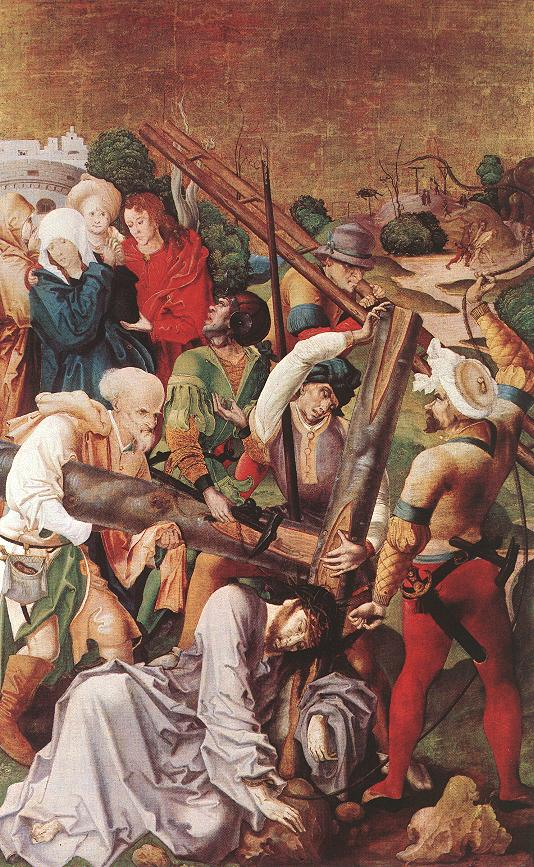
Carrying the Cross, Christian Museum

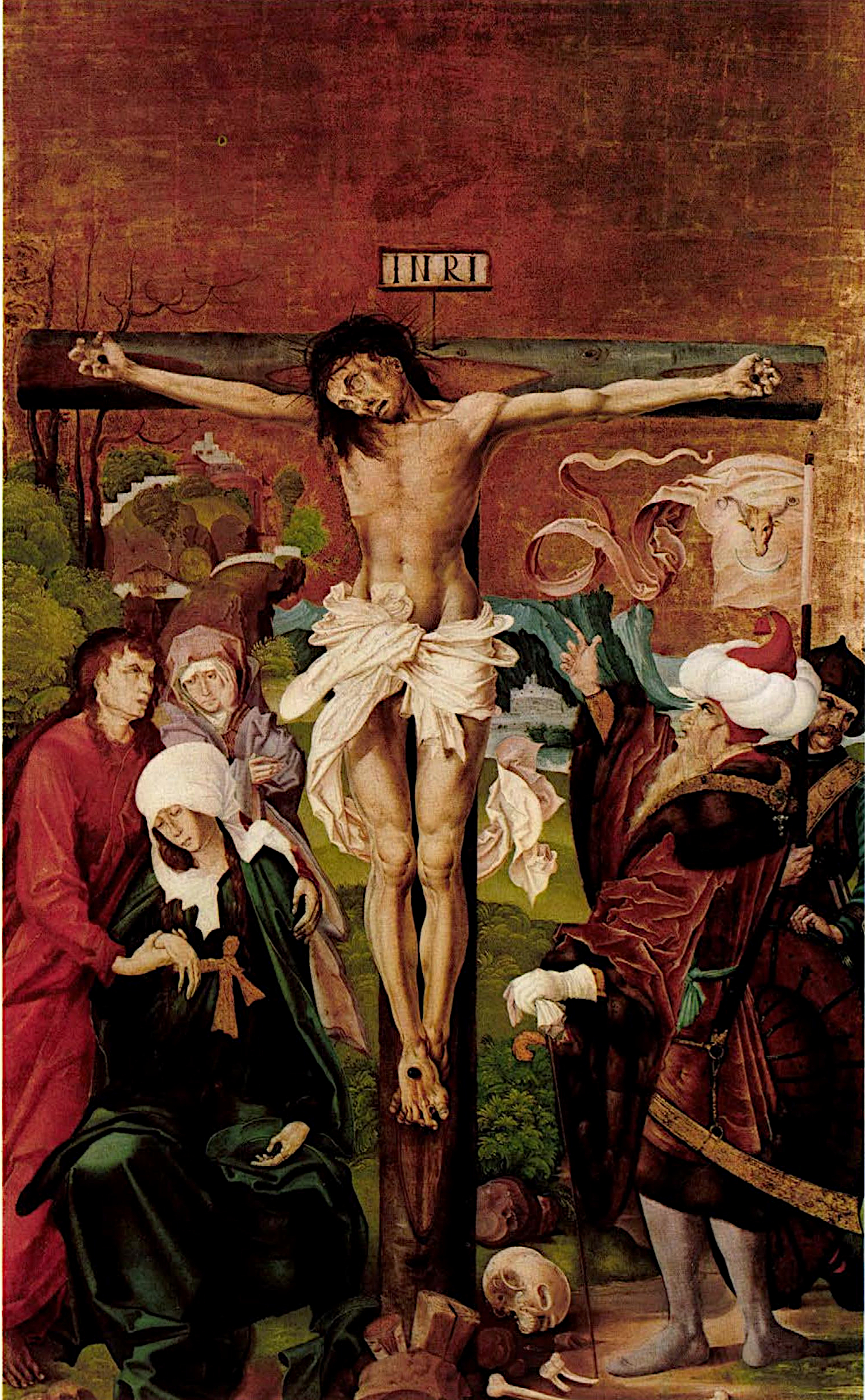
Calvary, Christian Museum

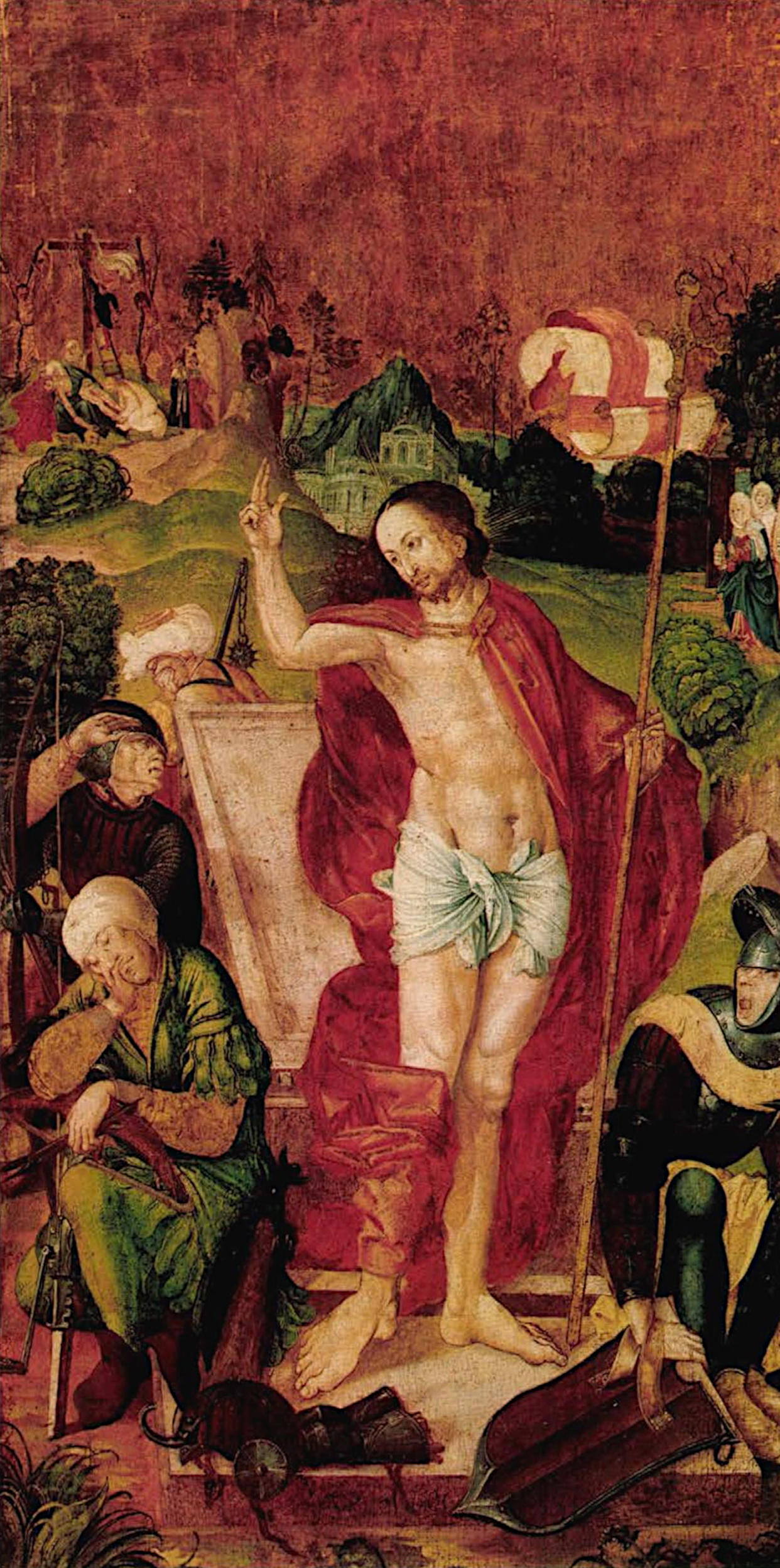
Resurrection, Christian Museum
