= Béla Grünwald =

Hungarian nationalist politician (1839–1891)

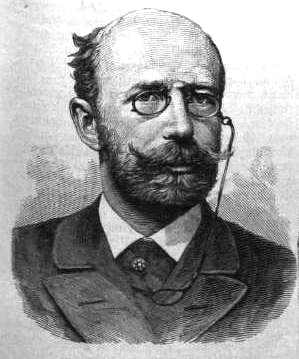

Member of the House of Representatives for Szliács
- In office 17 October 1878 – 4 May 1891
- Preceded by: Béla Radvánszky
- Succeeded by: György Radvánszky

Personal details
- Born: 2 December 1839 Szentantal, Kingdom of Hungary, Austrian Empire
- Died: 4 May 1891 (aged 51) Courbevoie, Paris, France
- Party: Liberal Party (until 1880); Independent (1880); Moderate Opposition (1880–91)
- Education: Royal University of Pest

Béla Ferenc József Grünwald de Bártfa (Hungarian: bártfai Grünwald Béla Ferenc József; 2 December 1839 – 4 May 1891) was a Hungarian nationalist politician and historian who was active in Upper Hungary (today mostly Slovakia). Within his own party, the parliamentary opposition, he found himself increasingly marginalized due to his nationalist views. The politically ostracized Grünwald then turned his attention to historiography.

Grünwald committed suicide by gunshot wound to the head in unclear circumstances while visiting Paris on 4 May 1891. Shortly before his suicide, he sent a telegram to Albert Apponyi, the leader of the Moderate Opposition, briefly notifying him of his own death.

== Life and career ==
Born in Szentantal to a Zipser German father, Augustin Grünwald and a noblewoman with Polish ancestry, Johanna Majovszky, Grünwald trained as a lawyer, receiving a degree from the Royal University of Pest. He attended universities in Paris, Berlin, Heidelberg, received a law degree and attended philosophy lectures. After a few months in Belgium and France, he returned to his parents' house in Besztercebánya. Serving first as administrator (alispán) of Zólyom County, in the 1878 elections he was elected a member of the Hungarian House of Representatives for Szliács (modern Sliač) in that county as a member of the Liberal Party; he subsequently left the Liberals in 1880, serving as an independent before joining the Moderate Opposition party.

Grünwald was an activist for the assimilationist policies of Magyarisation in the predominantly Slovak region of Upper Hungary, founding and supporting the Upper Hungary Magyar Educational Society. He viewed the construction of a centralised state as a political priority. He explained his views on the policy in his 1876 book Közigazgatásunk és a szabadság ("Our Public Administration and Freedom"), in which he urged Hungarian politicians to act as effectively and inexorably as the French in France and the English in the United Kingdom.

Within his own party, the parliamentary opposition, he found himself increasingly marginalized due to his nationalist views. His program failed to gain widespread approval even within his own party. In 1886, Dezső Szilágyi (the former administrative expert of the Apponyi Albert-led opposition party) withdrew from the governing party, taking steps towards the independence opposition that stood on the platform of the inviolability of autonomy of the counties. The politically ostracized Grünwald then turned his attention to historiography. For his first work, the 1888 publication "The Old Hungary," the Hungarian Academy of Sciences elected him as a corresponding member. In 1890, he published a book titled "The New Hungary" about István Széchenyi.

As a historian, Grünwald became a corresponding member of the Hungarian Academy of Sciences after the publication of his 1888 work, The Old Hungary (A régi Magyarország). In his historical works, he pursued a "democratic" method of historiography. He stated in The New Hungary (Az új Magyarország), the sequel to his 1888 book, "The genius, too, is born. He is born in a particular age, as a member of a particular nation, a class and a family, and the stamp these circles press onto his personality in his youth stays on him even if he later comes into conflict with them." He charged the Hungarian nobility with a lack of national sentiment, and feeling greater solidarity with nobles from other nations than with the Hungarian nation; the nobles, he argued, had neglected the development of Hungary as a nation-state. Nevertheless, on 22 April 1889, he accepted ennoblement from Emperor Franz Joseph I, becoming "de Bártfa" (bártfai).

Despite his great effort and numerous published books, his historical works were not recognized by the official Hungarian academic circles of historiography, which was very frustrating for him as he had invested a tremendous amount of energy and time into his works. Additionally, alongside his worsening personal life troubles, his health had also deteriorated.

Grünwald committed suicide by gunshot wound to the head in unclear circumstances while visiting Paris on 4 May 1891. Shortly before his suicide, he sent a telegram to Albert Apponyi, the leader of the Moderate Opposition, briefly notifying him of his death: "Béla Grünwald has died after a long period of suffering". In his famous dramatic 1929 account, The Paris Story (A párizsi regény), Dezső Szomory describes Grünwald's death and burial:

He committed suicide on the bank of the Seine, just next to the water, thinking in one final thought that the water current would take him far away. But the water current didn't hurt him; it only washed the wound on his temple ... Grünwald's burial at Montmartre Cemetery was yet more dismal. On this autumnal day, [the cemetery] was like an English landscape, with plenty of grey air, some trees, some shrubs ...

— Dezső Szomory, A párizsi regény

Grünwald's epitaph reads, "Here lies Béla Grünwald, unbreakable apostle of the Hungarian theory of the state."

== Works ==
- Közigazgatásunk és a magyar nemzetiség [Our Administration and Hungarian Nationality] (1874). Budapest: Ráth Mór.
- Közigazgatásunk és a szabadság [Our Administration and Liberty] (1876). Budapest: Ráth Mór. (Available at the Hungarian Social Science Digital Archive.)
- A Felvidék [Upper Hungary] (1878). Budapest: Ráth Mór. (Available at archive.org.)
- A törvényhatósági közigazgatás kézikönyve [Handbook of Municipal Administration] (4 vols., 1880–1889). Budapest: Ráth Mór (vols. 1–3), Franklin Társulat (vol. 4). (Available at archive.org.)
- Kossuth és a megye. Válasz Kossuth Lajosnak [Kossuth and the County: Response to Lajos Kossuth] (1885). Budapest: Ráth Mór. (Available at oszk.hu.)
- A régi Magyarország, 1711–1825 [The Old Hungary, 1711–1825] (1888). Budapest: Franklin Társulat. (Available at archive.org.)
- Az új Magyarország. Gróf Széchenyi István [The New Hungary: Count István Széchenyi] (1890). Budapest: Franklin Társulat. (Available at archive.org.)

== Bibliography ==
- Benedek, Elek (1898). A magyar nép múltja és jelene [The Past and Present of the Hungarian People] (in Hungarian). Vol. 1. Budapest: Athenaeum Literary and Printing Co.
- Kirschbaum, Stanislav J. (2010). "Upper Hungarian Educational Association". The A to Z of Slovakia. The Scarecrow Press. pp. 300–1.
- Lackó, Mihály (1986). Halál Párizsban: Grünwald Béla történész művei és betegségei [Death in Paris: The Works and Sicknesses of the Historian Béla Grünwald] (in Hungarian). Budapest: Magvető.
- Lakatos, László (1910). "Új nemesek" [New nobles] (PDF). Huszadik Század (in Hungarian). No. 2. pp. 413–6.
- Pók, Attila (1982). "Állameszme-álom-eszme. Grünwald Béla útja" [State theory – dream theory: The path of Béla Grünwald]. História (in Hungarian) (1982/4): 23–4.
- Reszler, André (1998). "La présence française en Hongrie: Béla Grünwald et Sigismund Justh" [The French presence in Hungary: Béla Grünwald and Sigismund Justh]. Études Danubiennes (in French). 14: 31–9.
- Sturm, Albert, ed. (1888). "Grünwald Béla". Új Magyar Országgyűlési Almanach, 1887–1892 [New Almanac of the Hungarian National Assembly] (in Hungarian).
- Cs. Szabó, László (1939). Magyar néző. Napló az európai válságról [Hungarian Spectator: Diary on the European Crisis] (PDF) (in Hungarian). Budapest: Nyugat.
- Wilkinson, Tim (2009). "Rough Crossing – Literary Canons and Translation". The Hungarian Quarterly (193): 104–12.
