= Master MS =

German painter

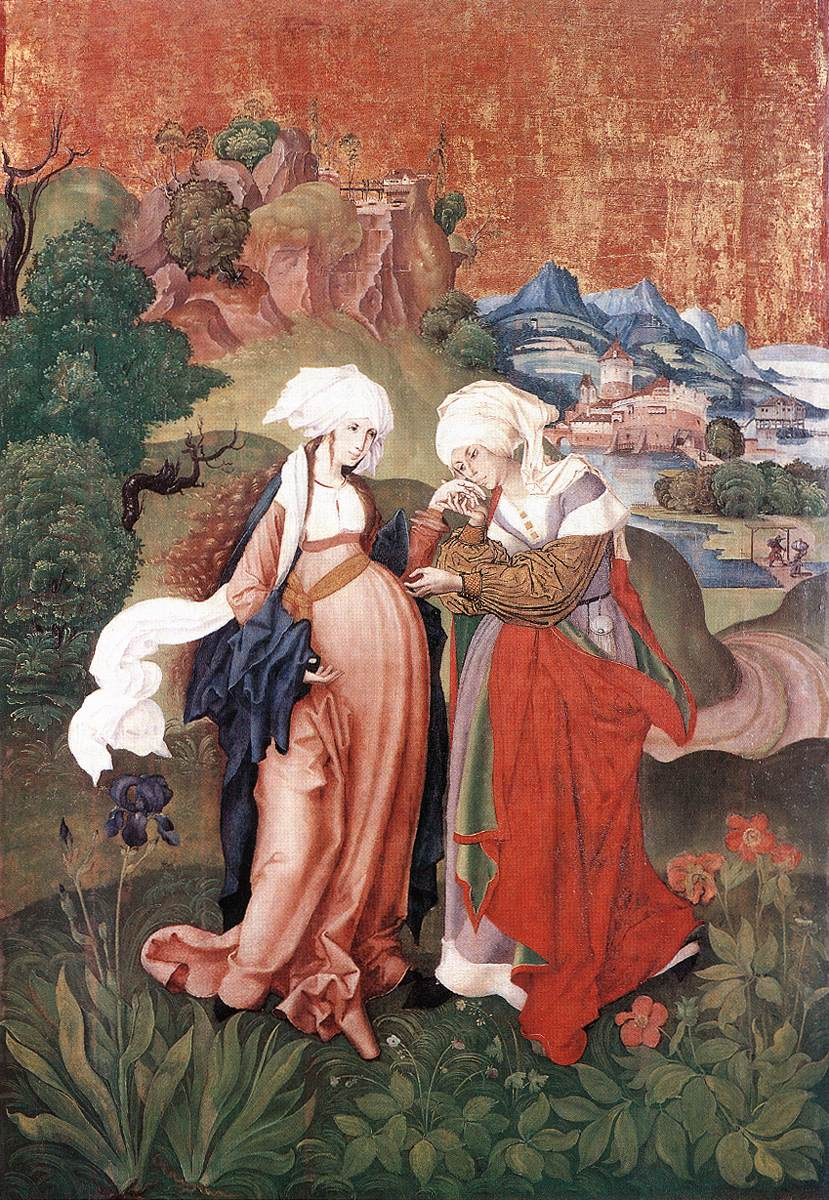
The Visitation : Mary visits Elizabeth (1500-1510)

Master M. S. (Hungarian: M. S. Mester, German: Meister M. S., Slovak: Majster M. S.) was a 16th-century painter in Central Europe in late Gothic and early Renaissance art.

He was active in Selmecbánya (now Banská Štiavnica, Slovakia) in the Kingdom of Hungary, and probably led a workshop there. Since his true name is unknown, he is sometimes identified with various other Gothic "masters". German art historians generally identify him with J. Brieu, a painter from Augsburg. Also some art historians identify him with the engraver Master MZ, often identified as Matthäus Zaisinger (1498–1555), a German goldsmith from Munich. According to other research the master could have been a Hungarian painter called Sebestyén, whose name is mentioned in the charter of Selmecbánya in 1507. The art historian Miklós Mojzer noted the similarities between this work and that of the painter who accompanied Veit Stoss and made the passion paintings in an altar now in the Esztergom Christian Museum and he called him Marten Schwarz. His art combining dramatic depth and colourful decorative formation is akin to that of the German painters Martin Schongauer, Albrecht Dürer, J. Brieu and mainly Matthias Grünewald.

Only seven of his panel paintings are known out of eight which used to decorate the high altar of a church in Selmecbánya. It was believed that the altar was in the Saint Catherine Church, but according to the new research the pictures were part of the altar in the Virgin Mary Church, later rebuilt into the fortress called the Old Castle. Now there are four Passion paintings in Esztergom, Hungary, in the Christian Museum; the painting "The Birth of Christ" is held in Svätý Anton (formerly known also as Hontszentantal) near Banská Štiavnica, and The Adoration of the Magi is in the Museum of Lille in France. His painting entitled "The Visitation" depicts the meeting of the two saints, the Virgin Mary and St. Elizabeth, is in Budapest, in the Hungarian National Gallery.

There are also three more-than-life-size wood-carved polychromed sculptures preserved which originally belong to the same altar. The statue of Madonna is in the Saint Catherine Church of Banská Štiavnica, the statues of Saint Catherine and Saint Barbara are in the art gallery of the Slovak Mining Museum in Banská Štiavnica.

At the Old Castle in Banská Štiavnica, a half-sized maquette of the altar is exhibited, featuring full-coloured photocopies of all the known panel paintings by Master MS, as well as fragments of decorative wood carvings which presumably were parts of the altar.

== Gallery ==
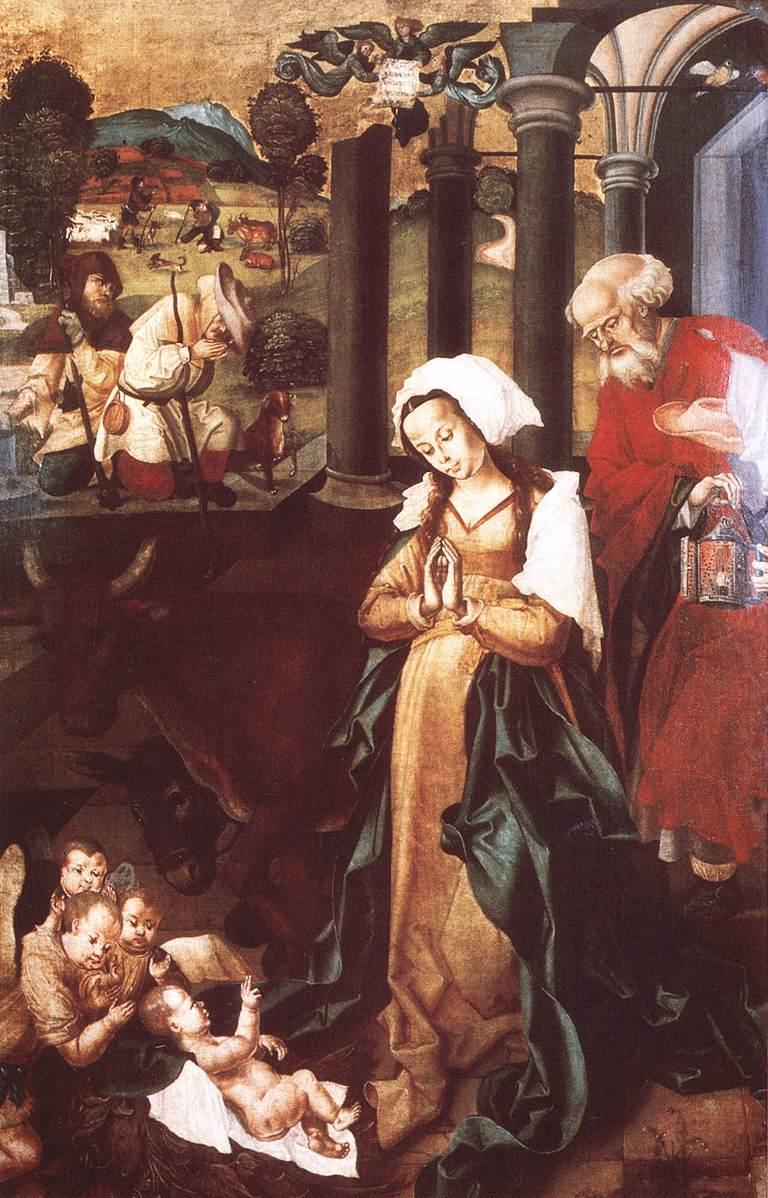
Birth of Jesus

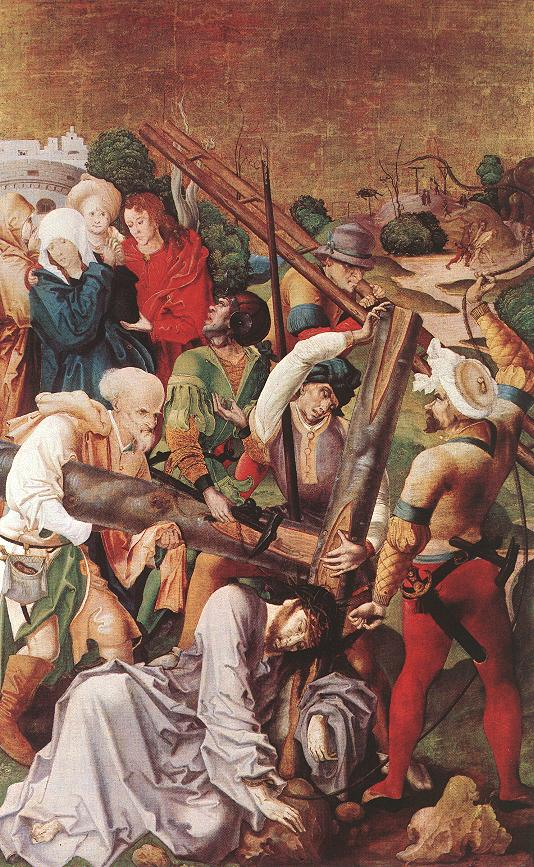
Carrying the Cross

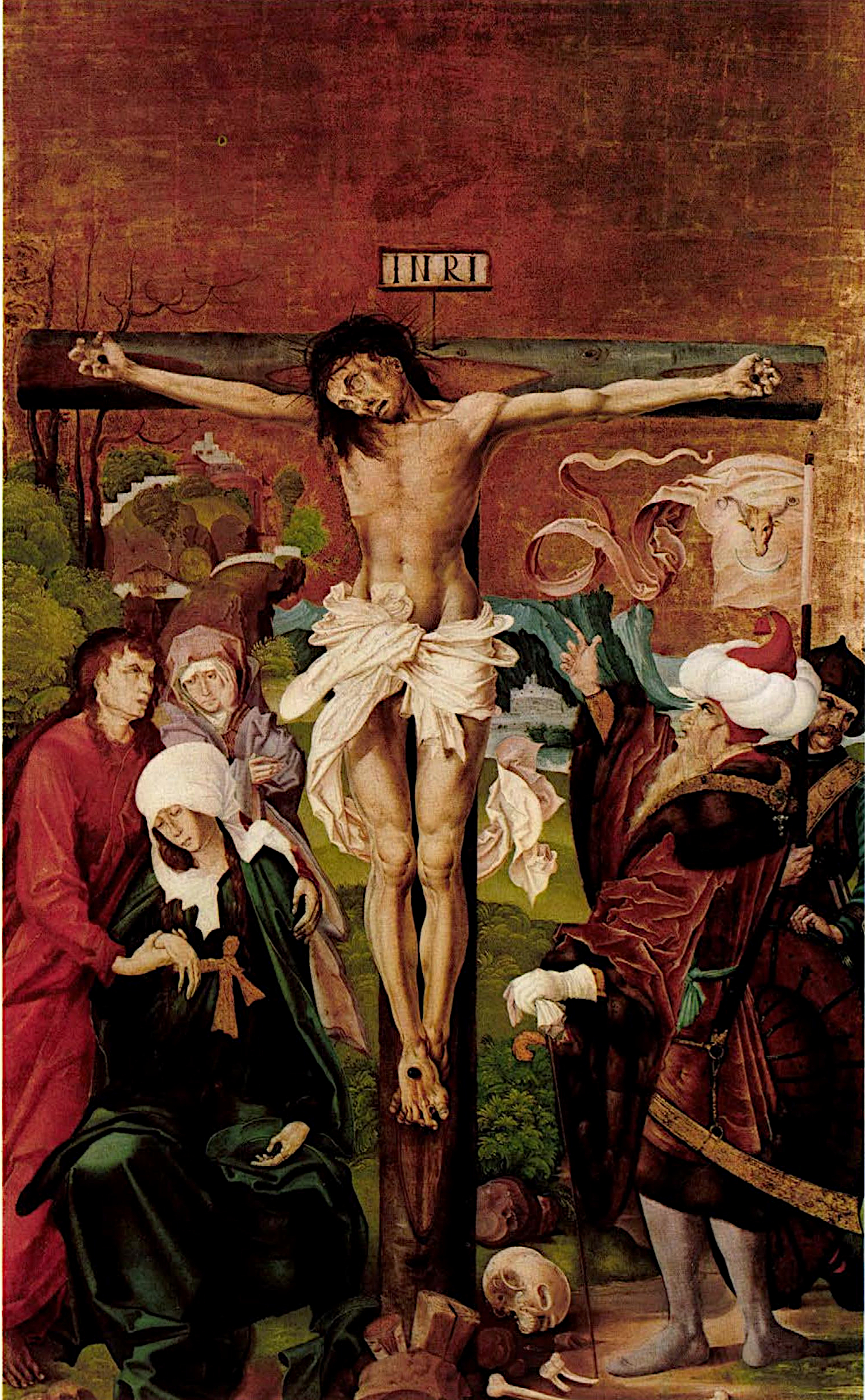
Calvary

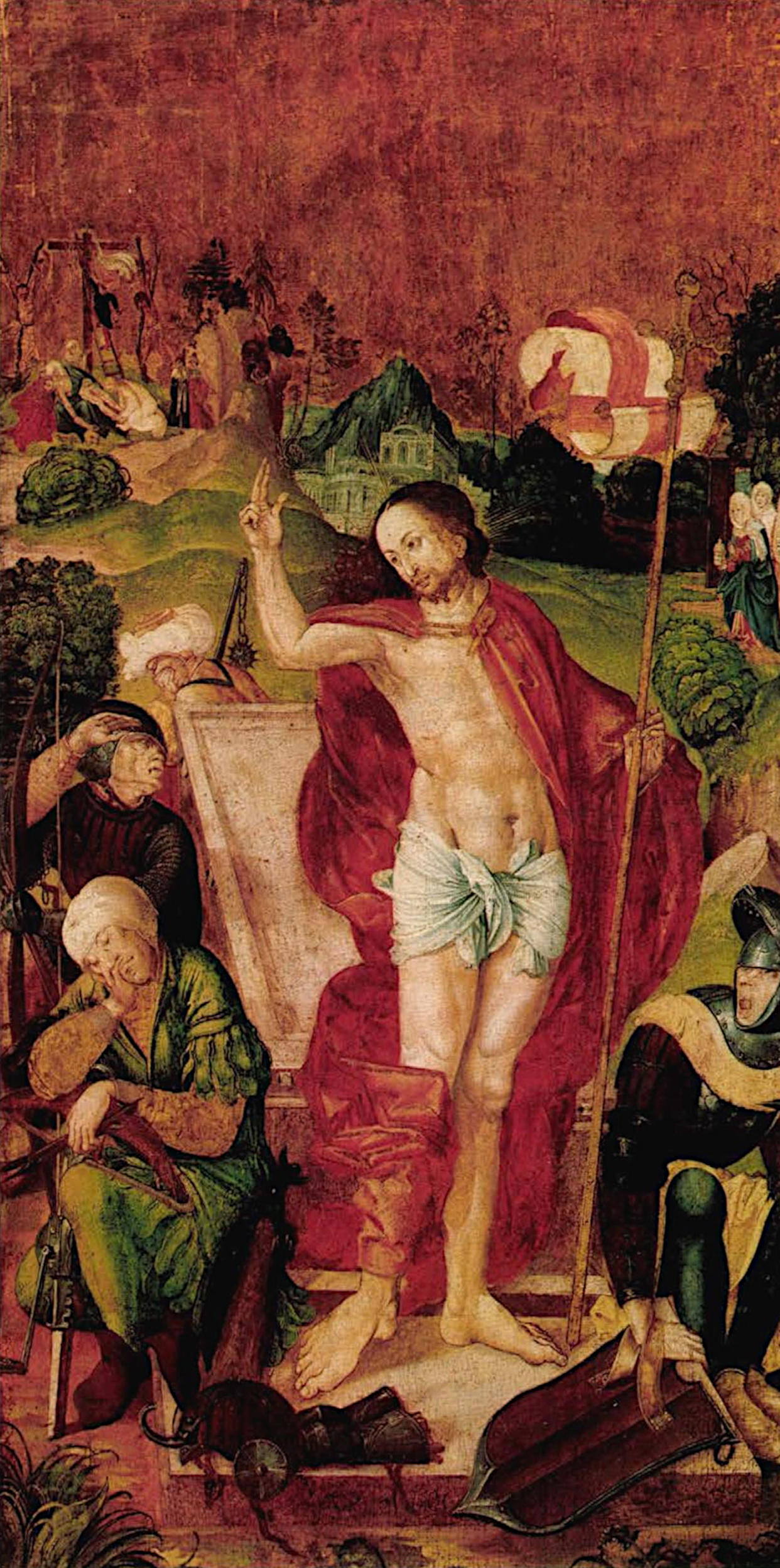
Resurrection

== Books and articles about Master MS ==
- Meister M. S., by Genthon István, Berlin, 1932
- 450 Jahre Meister M. S., by Radocsay Dénes, Budapest, 1957
- Tanulmányok a Keresztény Múzeumban II. : M. S. mester zászlai, by Mojzer Miklós, Művészettörténeti Értesítő, 1965
- M.S. mester passióképei az esztergomi Keresztény Múzeumban, by Mojzer Miklós, Budapest, Magyar Helikon, Corvina Kiadó Vállalat, 1976
- Paintings of the Passion by Master M.S. in the Christian Museum of Esztergom, English translation of the book by Miklos Mojzer by Lili Halapy (44P), ISBN 9789632073576
- "Magnificat anima mea Dominum" M S Mester Vizitáció-képe és egykori selmecbányai főoltára, catalog Kiállítási, Budapest, Magyar Nemzeti Galéria, 1997
- "Gemartert ward under Poncio Pylato.", Eörsi Anna
- Megjegyzések M S mester Kálváriájának ikonográfiájához. Művészettörténeti Értesítő XLVII. 1998, 199-213. oldal
- "Magnificat anima mea Dominum", by Végh János, M S mester Vizitáció-képe és egykori selmecbányai főoltára Új Művészet, VIII. évf. 10-11. sz. 1997. október-November, 20-22. oldal
