= Master MZ =

German engraver active in south Germany around 1500

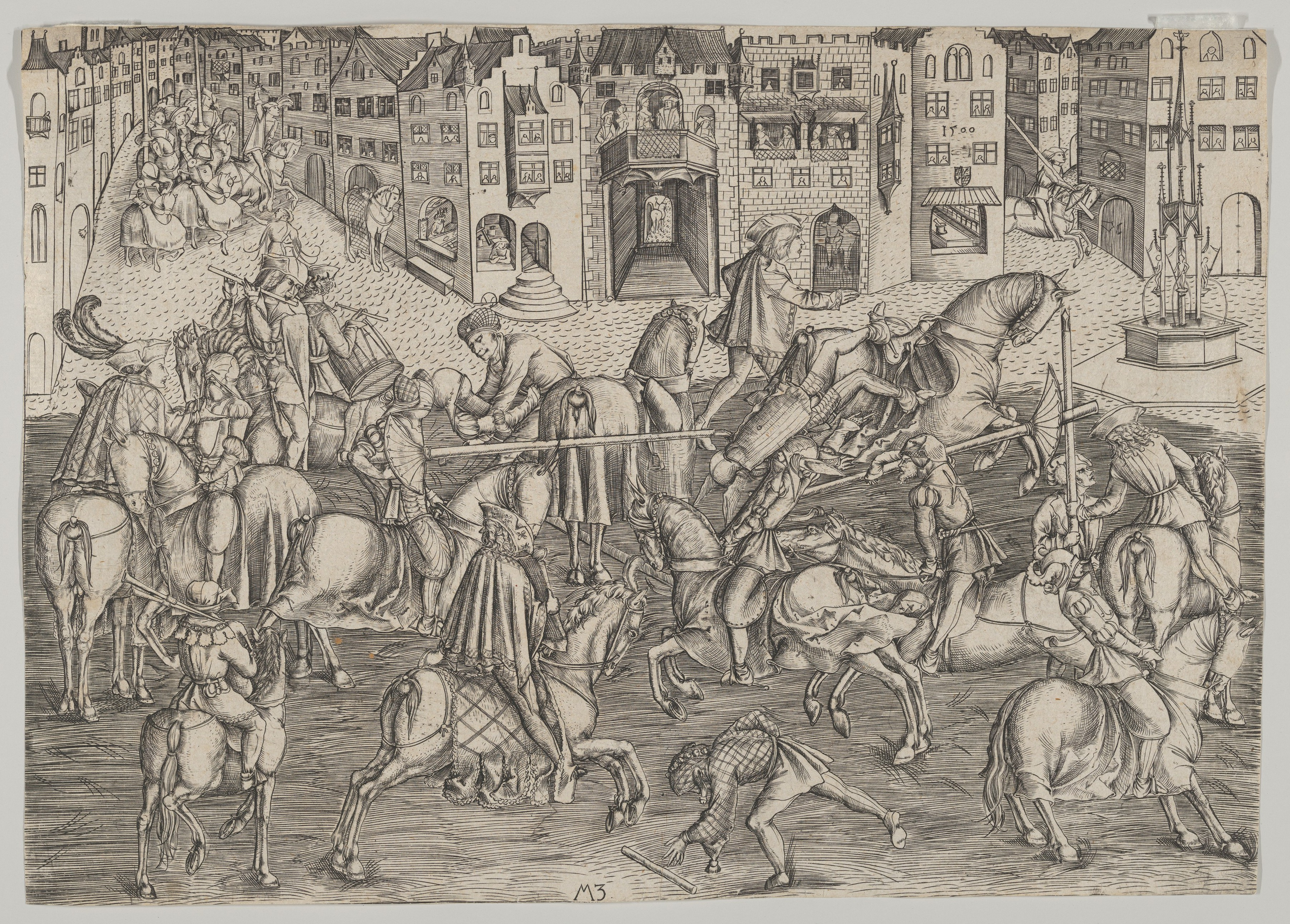
The Tournament, signed MZ and dated 1500. 8 3/4 × 12 3/8 in. (22.2 × 31.4 cm)

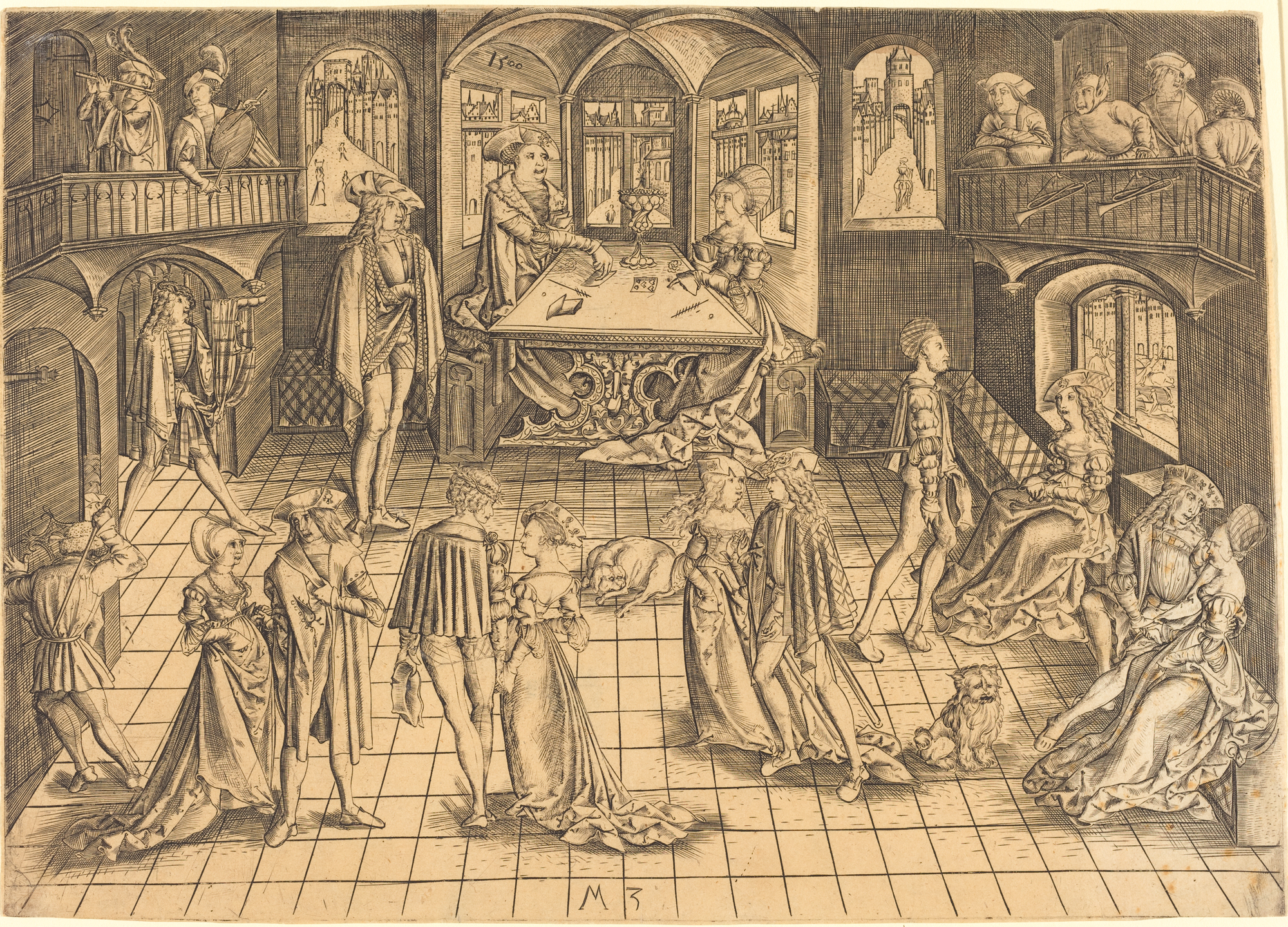
The Grand Ball, signed MZ and dated 1500 (22 x 31 cm)

Master MZ was an engraver active in south Germany around 1500. He signed his 22 engravings with his monogram "MZ", and six are dated, all 1500, 1501 or 1503. He worked in Munich in Bavaria, and in 1500 seems to have been connected to the court of Albert IV, Duke of Bavaria. There are complicated but inconclusive arguments for and against identifying him with a goldsmith called Matthäus Zaisinger, a painter known as Master MS, and other figures.

What appears to have been a brief period of printmaking, perhaps in mid-career, came when the prints of Albrecht Dürer, from nearby Nuremberg, were already taking German printmaking to new heights. MZ's style imitated Dürer's early engravings, without matching his quality, and perhaps he gave up the unequal struggle.

Although some of his prints are of conventional religious subjects, many show original secular compositions, and all show an individual "artistic vision", which in many respects foreshadows developments by others in the rest of the century. Technically, his style is characterized by rather weak drawing of figures and shaky perspective, but "delicate and spontaneous burin work", and a great interest in effects of light. A number of drawings have been attributed to him. His plates survived for later reprinting, and many prints are relatively common for early engravings, with at least seventy examples of The Grand Ball known.

== Engravings ==
The count of 22 engravings does not include a set of 13 engraved book-illustrations to the Ars Moriendi; these loosely follow the standard compositions for the subjects, seen in the engraved set by Master E.S. and various woodcut versions. Otherwise, his subjects are divided equally between religious and secular ones, the former being mostly saints and including no images of the adult Christ. The nine saints include four martyrdoms, four standing figures, and Saint George defeating the dragon. The most popular prints are all secular: The Embrace and the two large images of court life, The Tournament and The Grand Ball. All of these are dated, and The Embrace, the only print he dated 1503, shows a growing mastery of the medium, suggesting it was his last print.

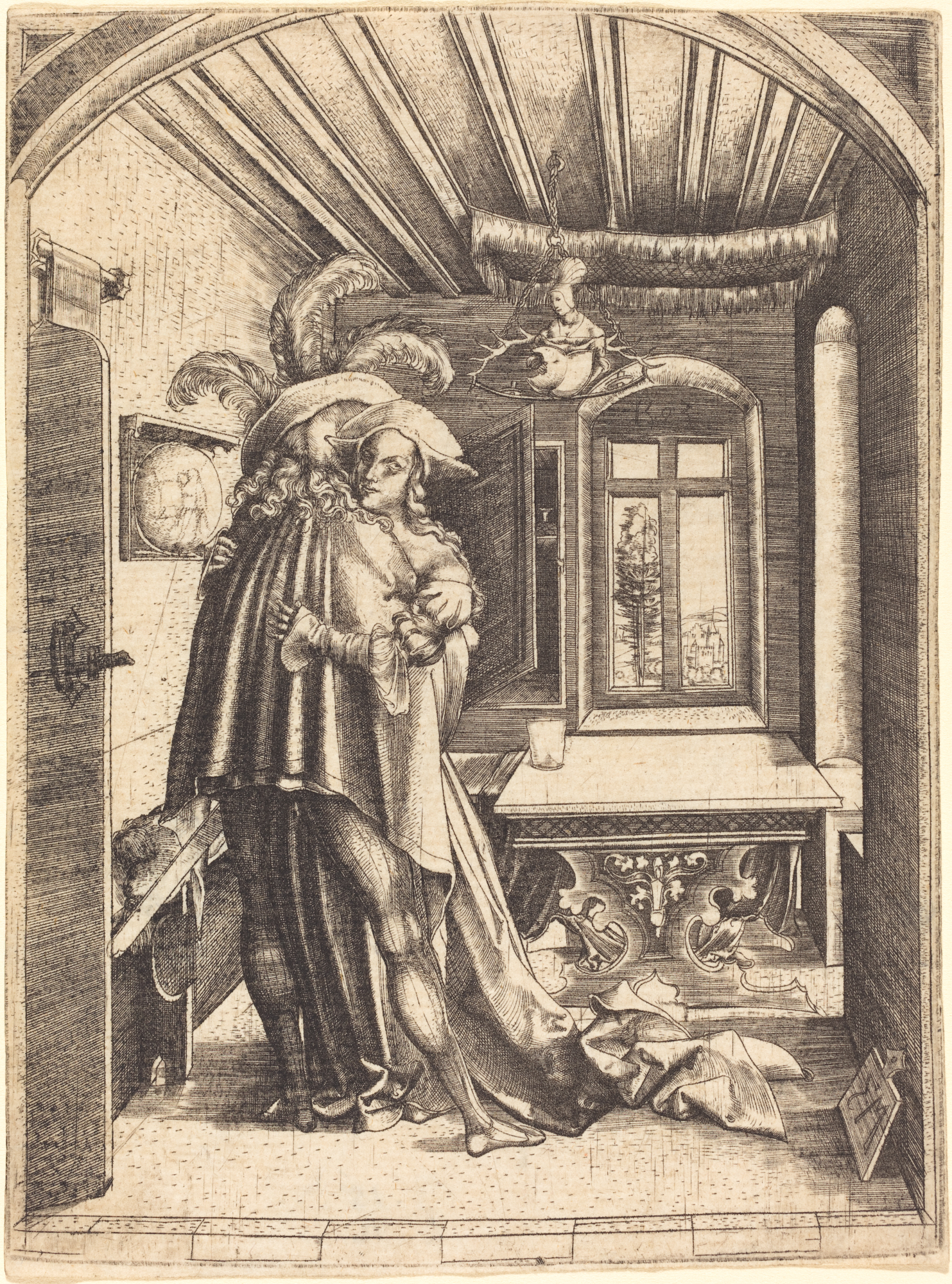
The Embrace, signed MZ and dated 1503 (15.8 x 11.7 cm).

Most prints have detailed backgrounds, whether landscapes, room interiors, or the townscapes in the two large court prints. In these a very relaxed approach to relative scale and graphical perspective is evident, for example in the scale of the figures in the side streets of The Tournament compared to the buildings beside and forward of them, and the sketched figures in the windows. In the Grand Ball the central group at rear are larger than the dancing figures in the foreground, and the same is true for some of the foreground group of tournament figures and their horses. Such effects are often exploited for an artistic purpose; in the Idolatry of Solomon the "huge" pagan wife towers over the kneeling king, and seems too tall for the room they are in.

The two large images of court life may represent specific festivities in 1500 at the court of Albert IV, Duke of Bavaria. He and his duchess Kunigunde of Austria are probably the figures playing cards at the back of the Ball, which compare well with their painted portraits, and the sketchy figures visible through the window at right may be taking part in the same tournament shown in the other print. In that print a couple on the balcony at top centre may also represent the duke and duchess, and the coat of arms of Bavaria appear below the date on a shop front at right. The palace building where the ball takes place has been identified by one scholar as the Neuveste at the north-east corner of the Munich Residenz, later replaced by the existing mainly Baroque buildings. Max Lehrs was uncertain about this, but agreed that a specific room in the Munich palace was shown. A preliminary drawing in chalk exists for two of the horsemen at lower right in the Tournament, which has a "spontaneous quality" lacking in the "awkward draftsmanship" in the engraving.

The Embrace, showing a couple embracing in a small but expensively-furnished room, has been found an enigmatic image by many critics. The man's face cannot be seen, and the woman looks out at the viewer with an ambiguous expression, with half her face in shadow. The fashionable lüsterweibchen chandelier above them, made of the bust of a woman holding a coat of arms and antlers (often real ones), may evoke the traditional use of horns and antlers as the symbol of the cuckold. This may be an illicit embrace, whether between lovers or a courtesan and her client, the last perhaps suggested by "the woman's off-the-shoulder dress and long, loose hair". The room may be found "homey", or disquietingly small; though it seems as though the fourth wall has been removed for the viewer, the gap has been given an architectural frame. Some scholars consider that details such as the "open cupboard and unlocked door", the "door-fastening which is suggestive of a phallic symbol" and the mirror are references to an irregular sexual encounter, though others downplay the significance of these.

The unusual image of The Woman with the Owl, dated 1500, shows a woman lifting her skirts to protect an owl. The motto in the sky behind her reads Duck dich or "Hide yourself", and the owl may represent sin or evil. Alternatively the scene may depict the content of a German folk song.

It is clear from analysis of the watermarks on the papers used, and the plate wear evident in many impressions, that most of the prints continued to be printed well into the 16th century. The watermarks suggest that later impressions were mostly printed in Cleves, Augsburg and Nuremberg. His engravings were also copied by other engravers.

== Possible identities ==
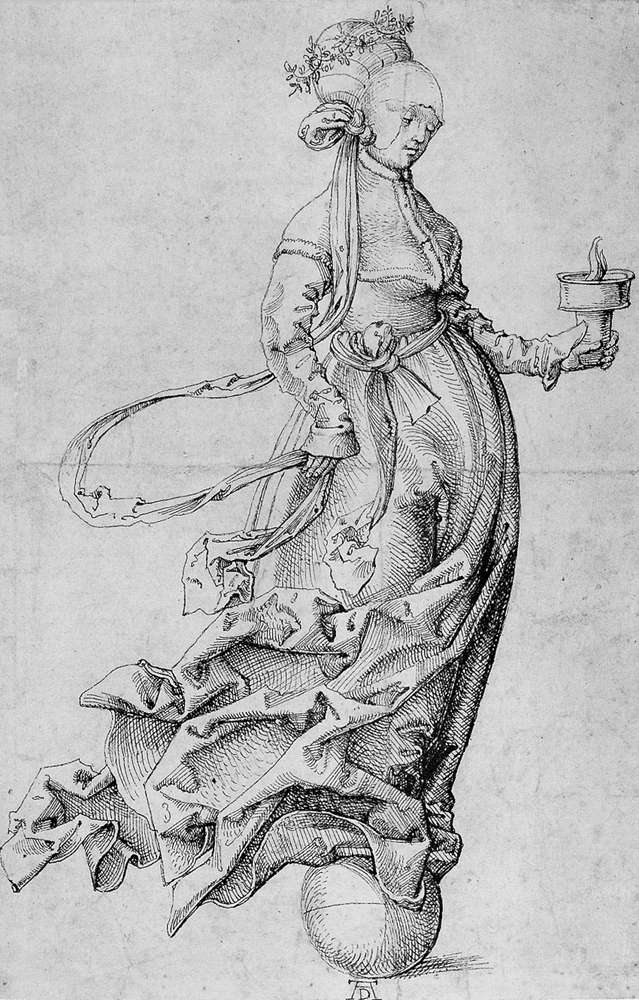
Fortune, drawing in black ink. The monogram of Dürer at the bottom is contemporary but fake.

=== Zaisinger ===
The name of Matthäus Zaisinger or Zazinger is connected to the prints of Master MZ from very early, in the list of his prints made by the Nuremberg collector Paul Behaim in 1618, which survives. Behaim calls Master MZ "Matheus Zaszinger" or "Zingel", without giving any reasons. Joachim von Sandrart included MZ in his Teutsche Academie of 1675, suggesting the initials stood for Martin Zink, Zatzinger or Zasinger. A Matthäus Zagel has also been introduced to the debate.

Subsequently, records of Matthäus Zaisinger (or Zaysinger) in Munich have been unearthed by scholars. These cover such a long period (active 1498-1555 as printer, goldsmith & mint official) that there are probably two of them, presumably father and son. The earlier is often identified with Master MZ, but this remains speculative. A surviving engraved piece of metalwork, the back of a reliquary dated 1501, is thought to be by Zaisinger.

=== Master MS ===
Another figure brought into the discussion is the painter who signed his works "MS" (as opposed to "MZ"), so is known as Master MS. Some scholars are attracted to identifying him with MZ because their styles are similar, and MS's engraving style, with much emphasis on effects of light, is regarded as indicating a training as a painter. His few drawings also suggest this. Little is known about Master MS, who is thought to have been German, but was apparently mainly active in Banská Štiavnica in modern Slovakia, a few years after the dates on MZ's engravings.

Many authorities, especially German ones, regard MZ as Zaisinger, but English-speaking ones tend to regard the matter as too uncertain to make a determination. Jane Campbell Hutchison concludes her discussion "For this and other reasons, it seems prudent to retain the monogram MZ as the artist's designation", and the British Museum's online biographical note says "None of these or other proposed identities is yet persuasive."

== Context ==
Albrecht Dürer established his workshop in Nuremberg on his return from Italy in 1495, and was quickly producing woodcuts and engravings of exceptional quality. The Free Imperial City of Nuremberg was a free imperial city, largely self-governing and controlling the area a good way around the city, and patchy territories beyond. Most of Bavaria was divided between the Duchies of Bavaria-Munich and Bavaria-Landshut, ruled by distantly-related branches of the House of Wittelsbach.

Perhaps as a ducal response to the impact of Dürer, both duchies produced artists who made engravings for a very few years around 1500: Master MZ in Munich and Mair von Landshut in Landshut. The two make an interesting comparison, with strong similarities and differences. Like MZ, Mair is credited with just 22 engravings, but also three woodcuts. Ten Mair engravings are dated, all with 1499. Their biographical details are about equally unknown, but both were probably mainly painters; unlike MZ (unless he is also Master MS), several surviving paintings are attributed to Mair.

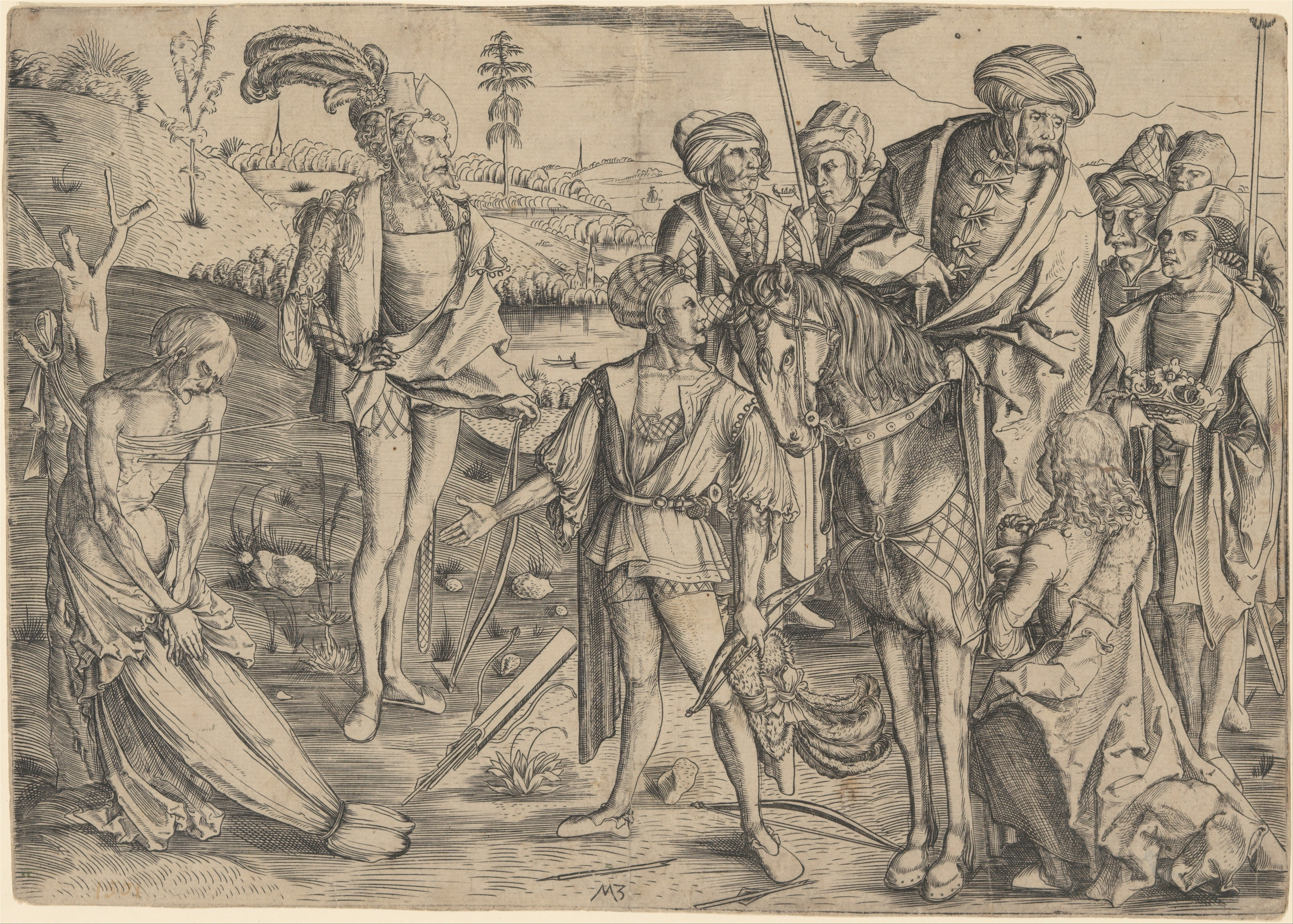
The Dead King and his Three Sons, 17.2 x 24.5 cm.

The engravings of both divide between religious and secular subjects, and both share an interest in courtly life. Both sets of works display the idiosyncrasies of the artist even in conventional religious scenes. Mair likes to give his figures a setting in complicated and "fantastic architectural spaces, with walls joining at the most unlikely angles. The scenes resemble whimsical stage sets, and are endowed with an unreal character, like something from a fairy tale." MZ's interior settings and landscape backgrounds are interesting, but he pays greater attention to details of dress, and "labyrinths of gracefully fluted drapery folds"; he is also more up to date in his fashions than Mair, some of whose figures seem to wear fashions some decades old. They probably kept an eye on each other; it is unlikely to be coincidence that they both made engravings of the obscure subject of the story of The Dead King and his Three Sons, the only early prints of it that Wolfgang Stechow could find in his study.

Both may be regarded, especially in comparison to Dürer, as the last backward-looking evocations of Late Gothic, but each had an innovative aspect. With Mair it is his experiments in bringing colour to his prints, many of which were made on "prepared" coloured paper, and then given coloured highlights by hand. These attempts were followed up by many northern printmakers within three decades. With MZ it is his free burin technique, and "his spontaneity in the rendering of light emanating from a multitude of sources and producing reflexes and rich shimmering shadows". These also look forward to 16th-century German art, especially that of the Danube School.

This world came to an abrupt end in 1503, especially for Landshut, with the death without a male heir of George the Rich, the last Duke of Bavaria-Landshut. This brought disaster to the area, with the Imperial armies of Maximilian I, Holy Roman Emperor and brother-in-law of Duke Albert of Munich, devastating parts of it in the War of the Succession of Landshut (1503–05).

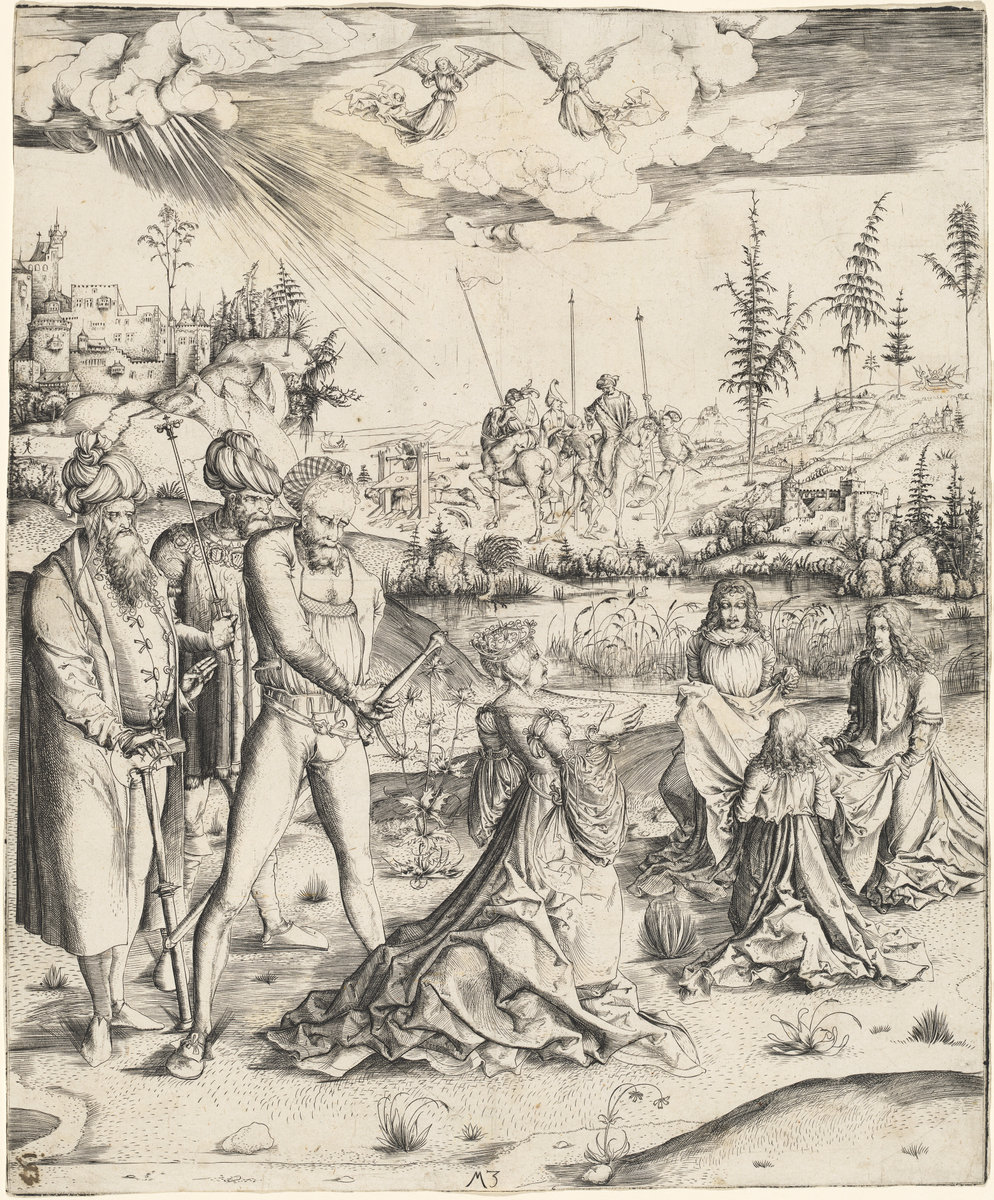
Martyrdom of St Catherine

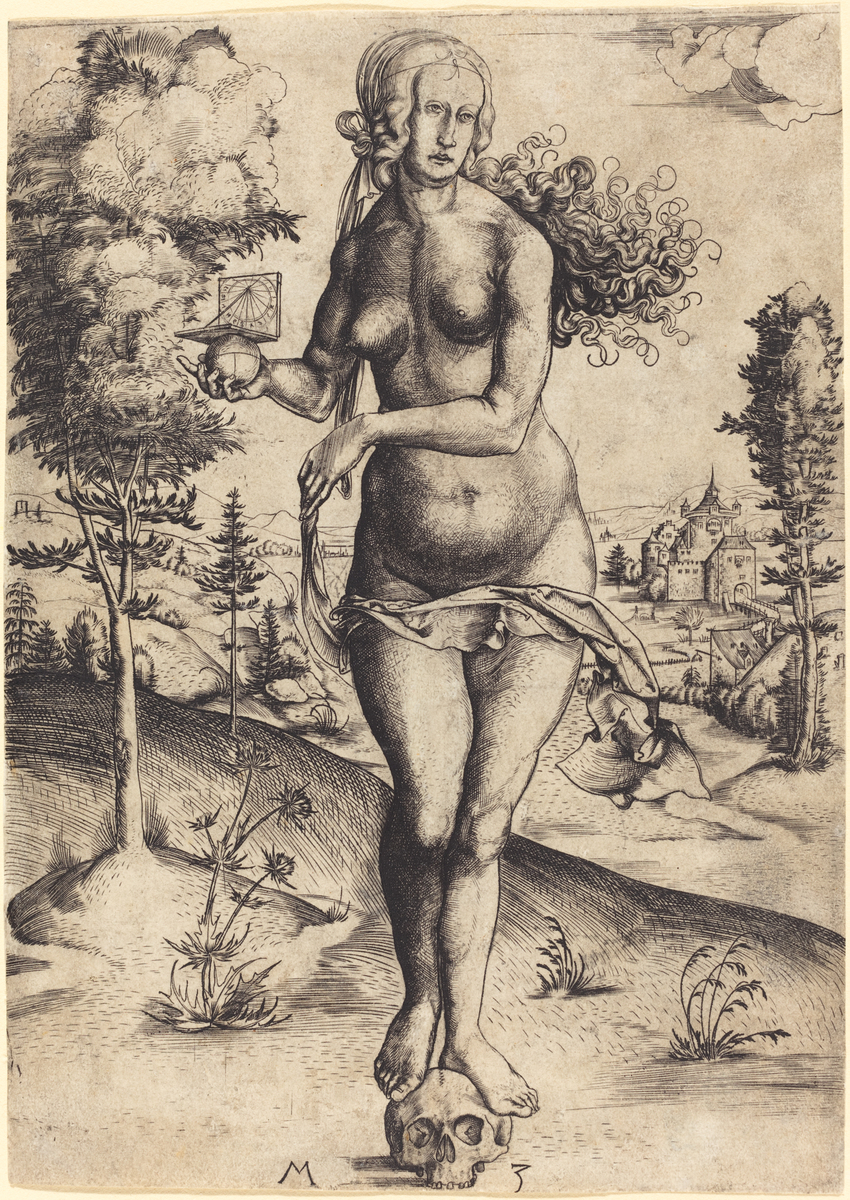
Memento Mori

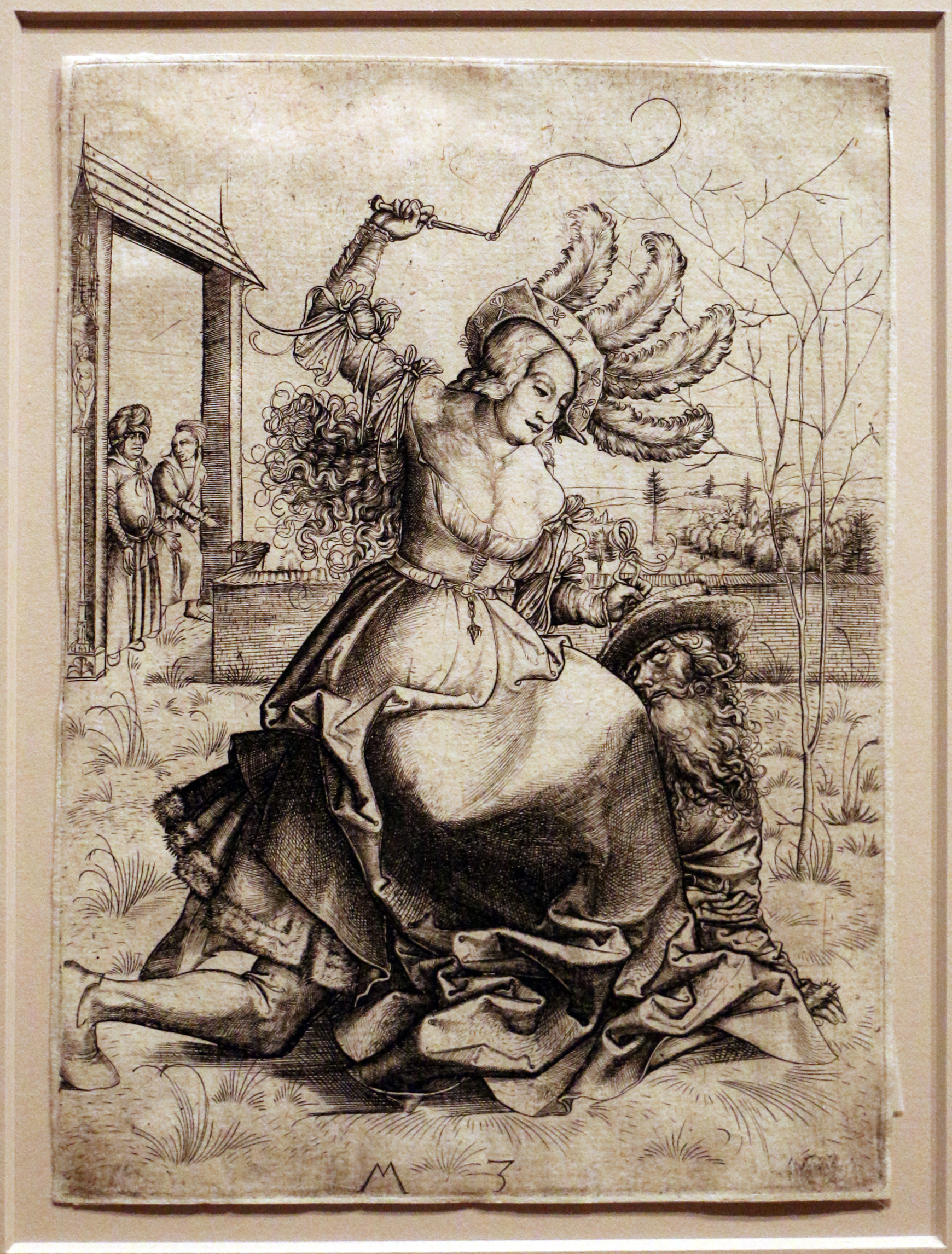
Phyllis and Aristotle, a popular Power of Women subject.

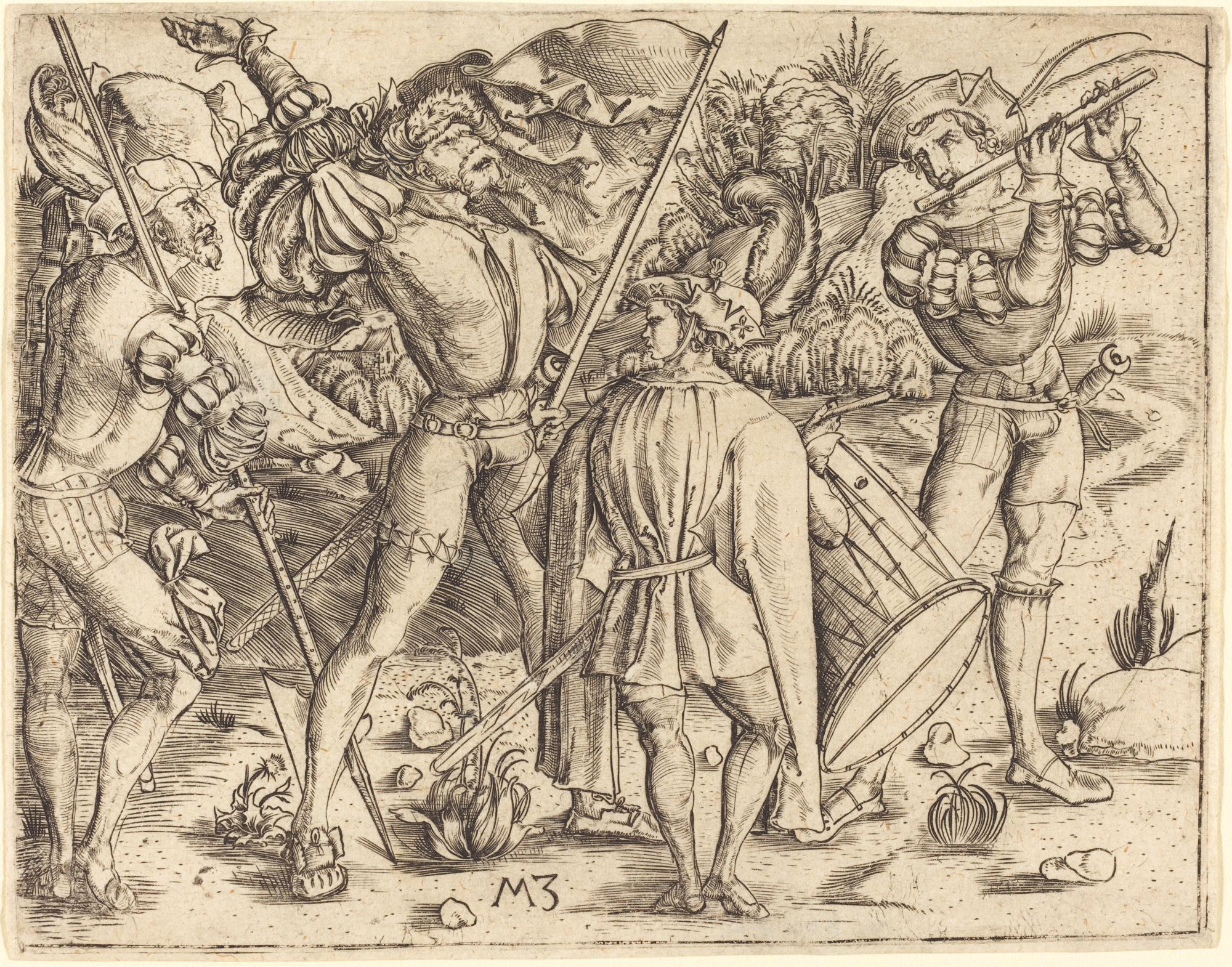
Four Soldiers, c. 1500 (from the wide shoes).

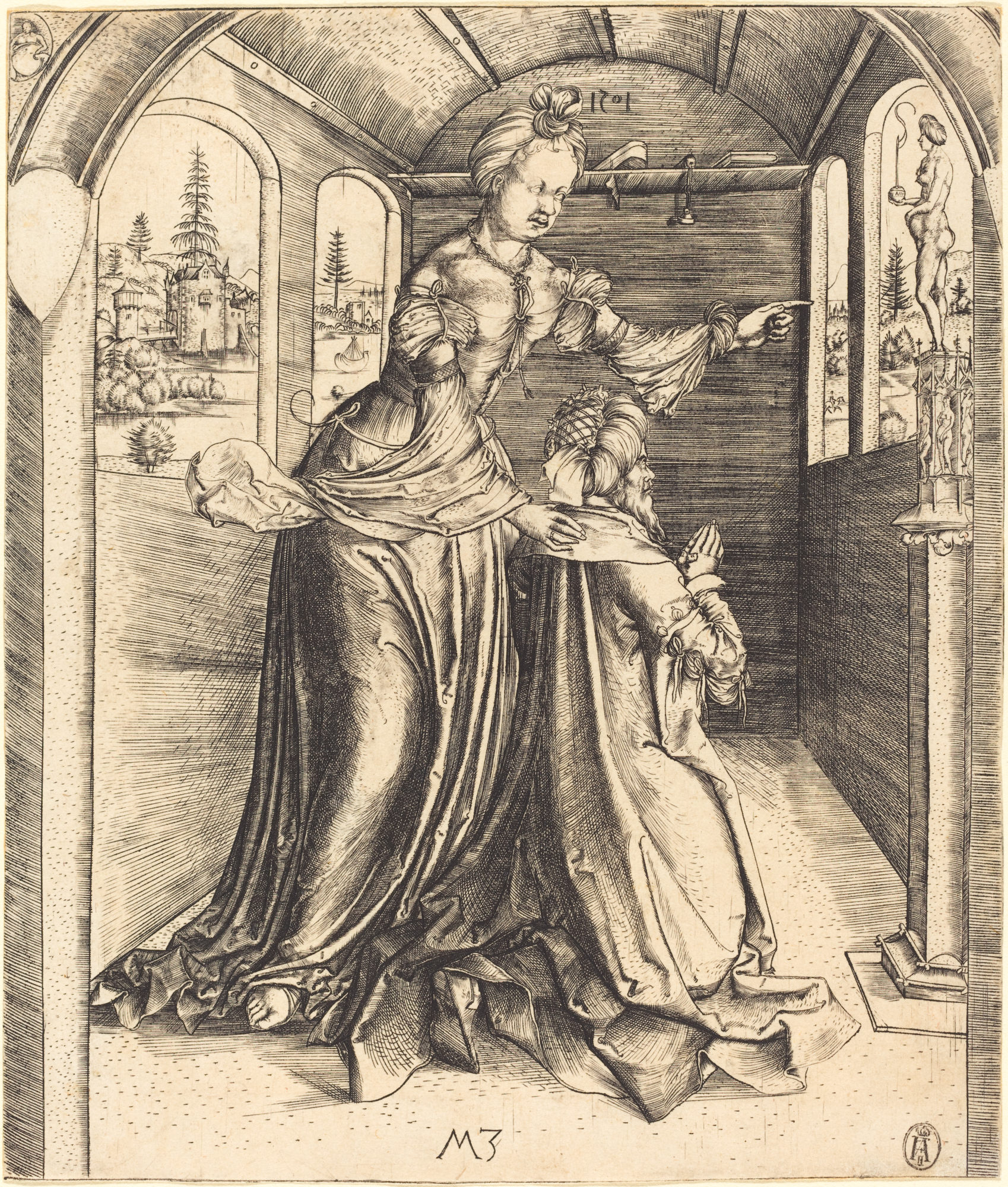
Idolatry of Solomon, dated 1501

== Prints by Lehrs numbers ==
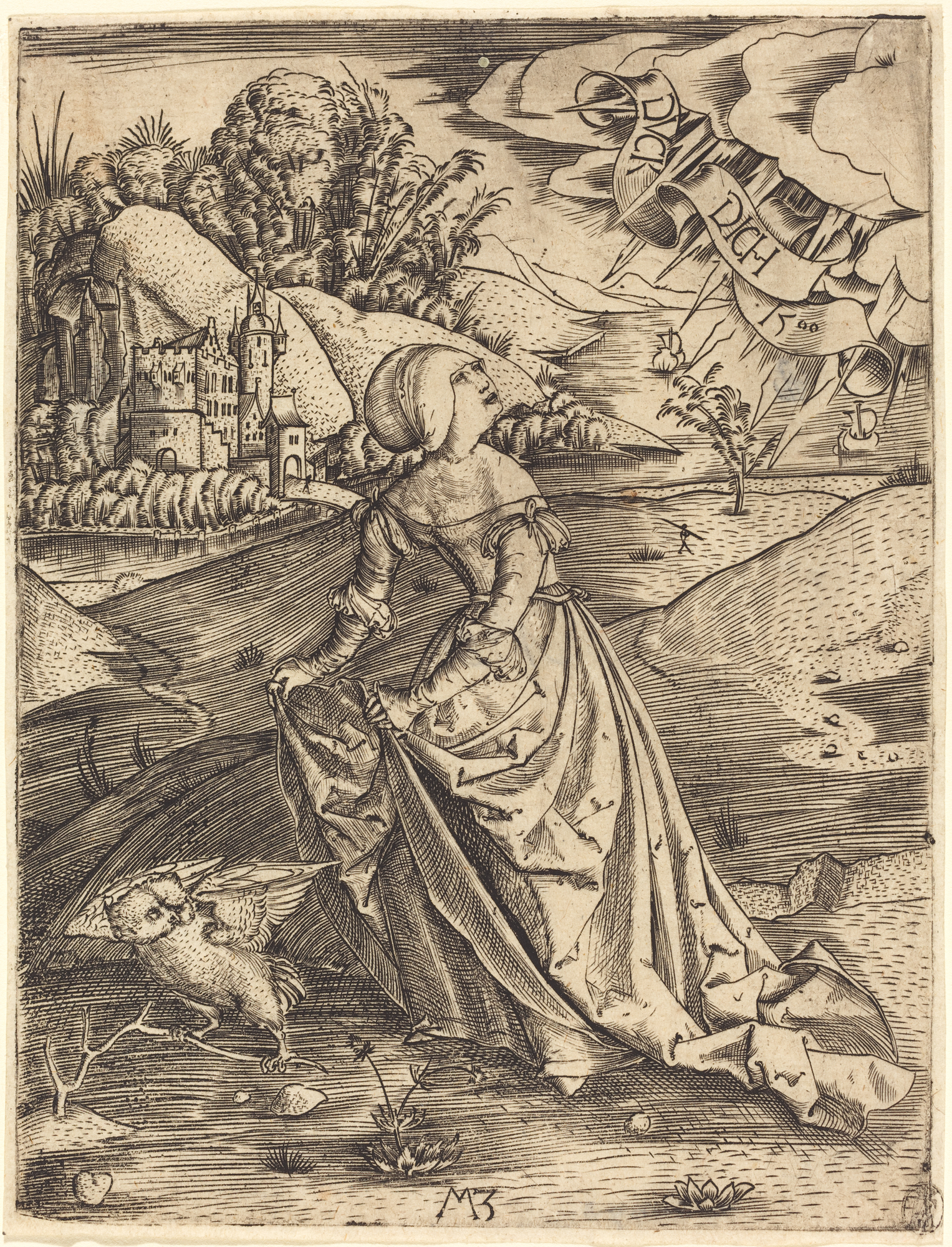
The Woman with the Owl, dated 1500. The motto in the sky reads Duck dich or "Hide yourself". The owl may represent sin or evil.

Following the catalogue of Max Lehrs (and the usual sequence of subjects established by Adam Bartsch):

1. Idolatry of Solomon, dated 1501
2. Virgin and Child by a fountain, loose copy of Dürer, dated 1501.
3. St Christopher
4. St George and the Dragon
5. Beheading of St John the Baptist
6. Martyrdom of St Sebastian
7. Martyrdom of St Barbara
8. St Catherine
9. Martyrdom of St Catherine
10. St Margaret
11. St Ursula
12. The Greeting
13. Four Soldiers
14. Knight and Lady on horseback
15. Pair of Lovers
16. The Embrace, dated 1503
17. The Grand Ball, dated 1500
18. The Tournament, dated 1500
19. The Woman with the Owl, dated 1500
20. Memento Mori, adapting aspects of several different Dürer prints.
21. The Dead King and his Three Sons
22. Phyllis and Aristotle

There is also a Man Walking, not in Lehrs.
