= Upper Hungary Magyar Educational Society =

Former NGO in Hungary

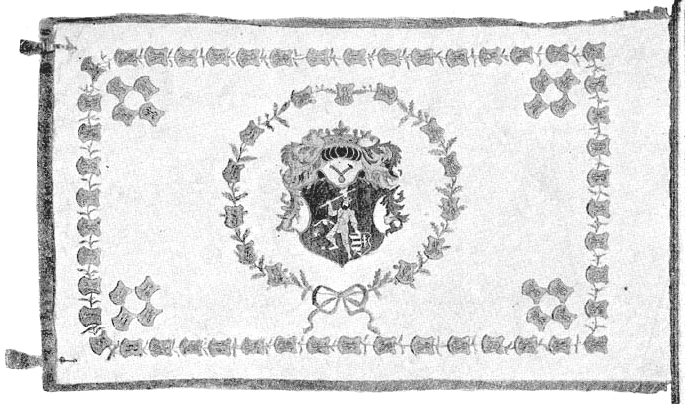
The flag of the Upper Hungary Magyar Educational Society

The Upper Hungary Magyar Educational Society (Hungarian: Felvidéki/Felsőmagyarországi Magyar Közművelődési Egyesület, FEMKE, also FMKE; Slovak: Hornouhorský maďarský vzdelávací spolok) was a non-governmental organization in Upper Hungary, founded on 20 November 1883, that conducted Magyarisation initiatives among the region's predominantly ethnic Slovak population. By sponsoring cultural activities, education for children, and the establishment of libraries and courses in the Hungarian language, the Society aimed to assimilate Slovaks into the country's Hungarian population while spreading the general use of Hungarian, then the official state language. It was based in Nyitra, now the city of Nitra in western Slovakia, and was supported by the prominent Hungarian nationalist Béla Grünwald and the Bishop of Nitra, Imre Bende. The organisation met some success: between 1900 and 1910, the proportion of self-identified Slovaks in Nyitra County dropped by over 6 percent, thanks in part to its efforts, and by 1910, it was estimated that 21 percent of the Slovak population in the country as a whole had learned Hungarian. The Society came to operate 227 libraries across Upper Hungary. Its establishment was followed by the setting up of a similar society in Transylvania. FEMKE was ultimately dissolved in 1919 after the breakup of the Kingdom of Hungary.
