= Országgyűlés =

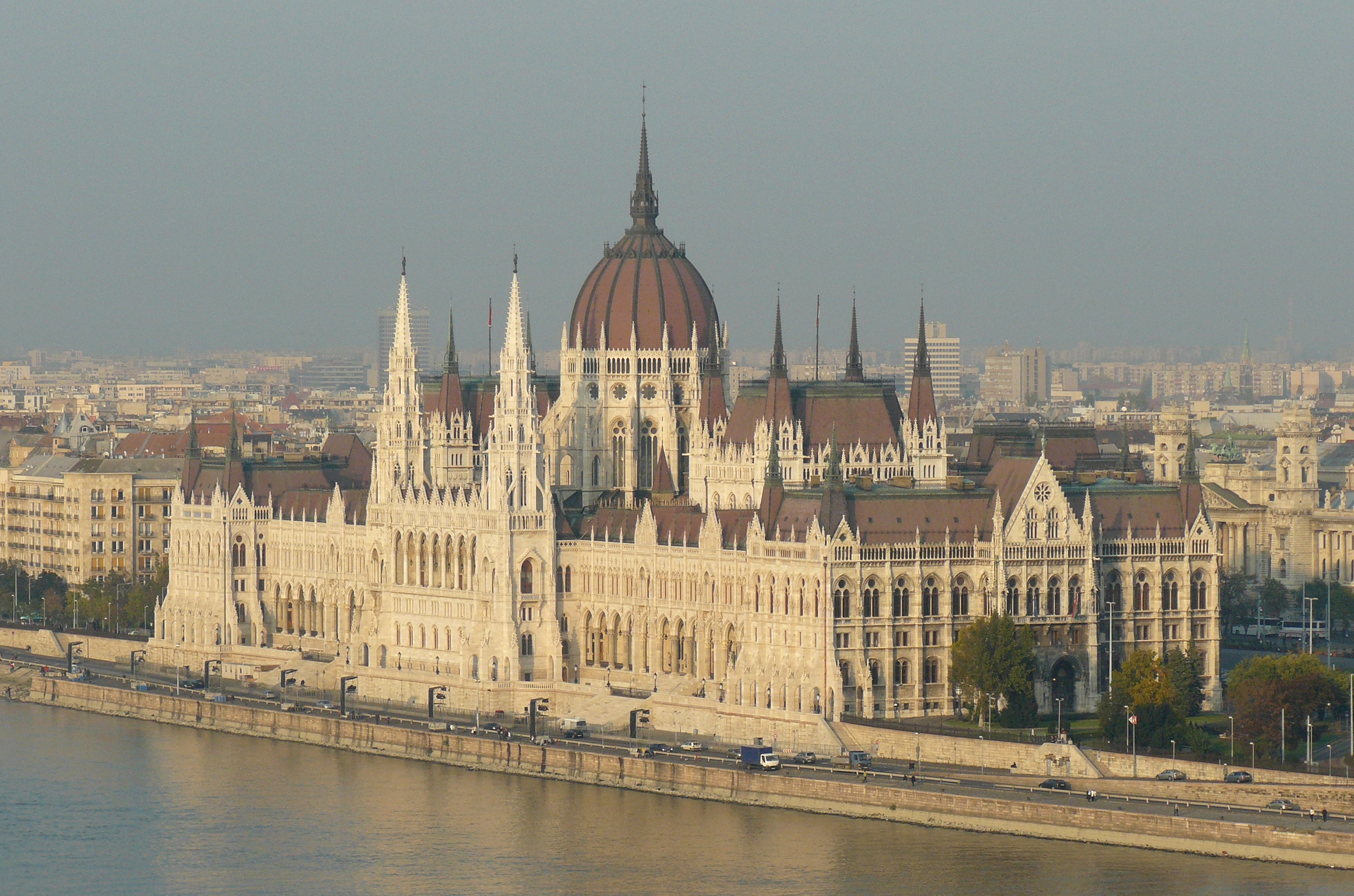
Parliament building in Budapest

From 1867 to 1918, Országgyűlés (Hungarian pronunciation: [ˈorsaːɡɟyːleːʃ]; "National Assembly") was the name of the bicameral parliament of the Kingdom of Hungary (Transleithania) during the Austro-Hungarian Empire (1867–1918), replacing the earlier Hungarian Diet.

The legislative power was vested in this parliament, consisting of two houses: an upper house titled the Főrendiház ([ˈføːrɛndihaːz], House of Magnates), and a lower house titled the Képviselőház ([ˈkeːpviʃɛløːhaːz], House of Representatives). From 1902 the Országgyűlés met at the Hungarian Parliament Building on the Danube in Budapest.

== Early history ==
An assembly of the Hungarian estates of the realm and royal free cities (szabad királyi város) had convened at Bratislava (Pozsony) since the late Middle Ages; however, it never achieved extended legislative rights in the centralised Habsburg monarchy and the succeeding Austrian Empire. In the course of the Hungarian Revolution of 1848 a national assembly was called at Pest that was dismissed by decree of Emperor Ferdinand I of Austria in October; the next year a Hungarian assembly met at the Protestant Great Church of Debrecen, which declared the new Emperor Franz Joseph deposed and elected Lajos Kossuth regent-president. The revolution was finally suppressed by Austrian troops under General Julius Jacob von Haynau and the assembly dissolved.

The Habsburgs again approached toward the Hungarian estates after the disastrous defeat at the 1859 Battle of Solferino and the loss of Lombardy. In 1860 Emperor Franz Joseph issued the October Diploma, which provided a national Reichsrat assembly formed by delegates deputed by the Landtage diets of the Austrian crown lands, followed by the February Patent of 1861, promising the implementation of a bicameral legislature. The Hungarian magnates however rejected to be governed from Vienna and insisted on an own parliamentary assembly with comprehensive autonomy in Hungarian affairs. The negotiations failed, predominantly due to the tough stance of Austrian Minister-President Anton von Schmerling.

Finally in the course of the Austro-Hungarian Compromise of 1867, the emperor appointed Gyula Andrássy Hungarian minister-president and the re-established national assembly convened on 27 February.

== Főrendiház (House of Magnates) ==
The House of Magnates was, like the current British House of Lords, composed of hereditaries, ecclesiastics, and, unlike the House of Lords, deputized representatives from autonomous regions (Similar to Resident Commissioners of United States territories). The House had no fixed membership size, as anyone who met the qualifications could sit in it. The official list:

- Princes of the royal house who have attained their majority (16 in 1904)
- Hereditary peers who paid at least 3000 florins a year land tax (237 in 1904) (at its 1896 exchange rate, £1 was worth 12 florins, so this comes to £250)
- High dignitaries of the Roman Catholic and Eastern Orthodox churches (42 in 1904)
- Representatives of the Protestant confessions (13 in 1904)
- Life peers appointed by the Crown, not exceeding 50 in number, and life peers elected by the house itself (73 altogether in 1904)
- Various state dignitaries and high judges (19 in 1904)
- Three delegates of Croatia-Slavonia

== Képviselőház (House of Representatives) ==
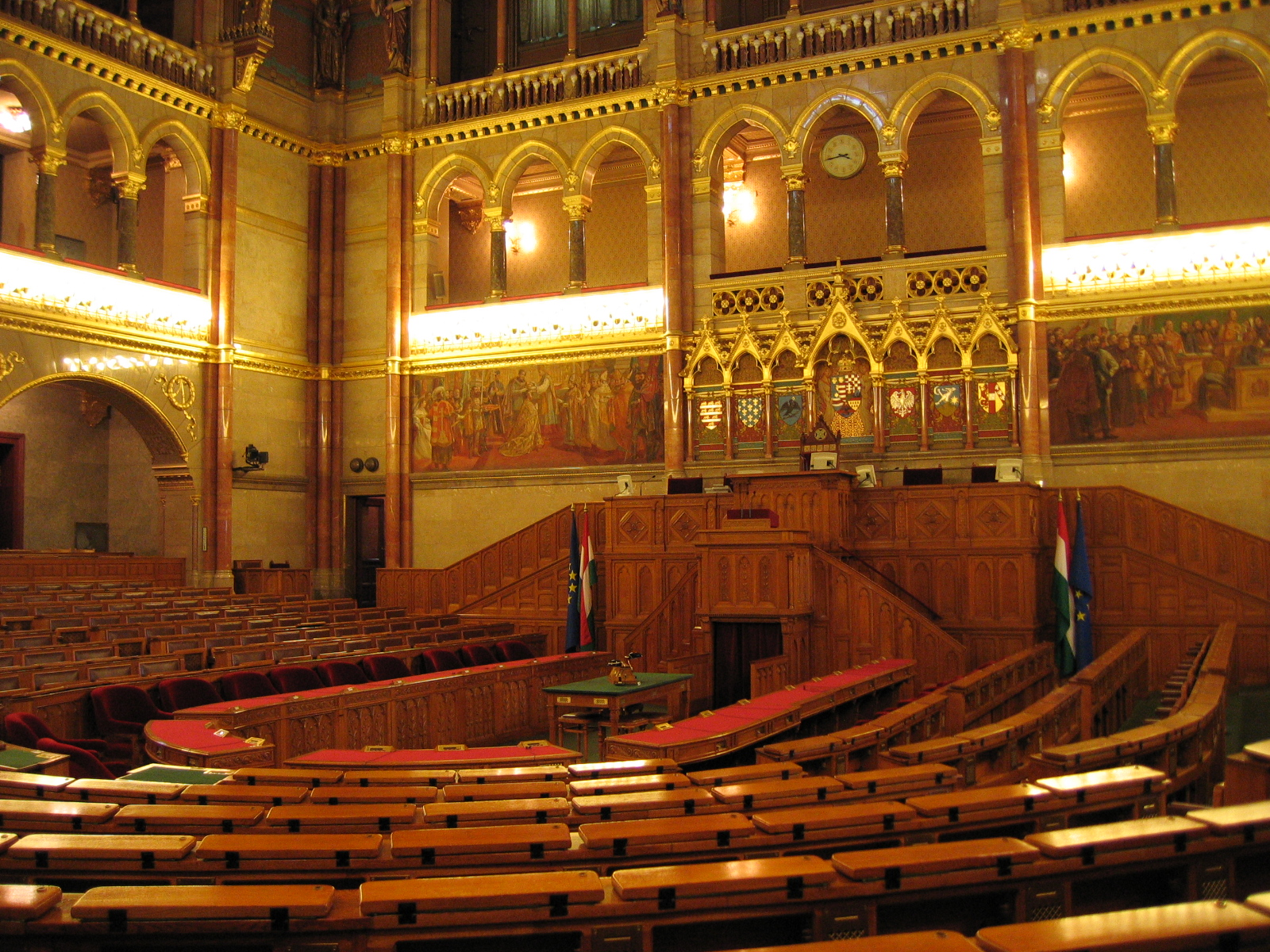
Assembly hall

The House of Representatives consisted of members elected, under the Electoral Law of 1874, by a complicated franchise based upon property, taxation, profession or official position, and ancestral privileges. The House consisted of 453 members, of which 413 are deputies elected in Hungary and 43 delegates of Croatia-Slavonia sent by the parliament of that Kingdom. Their terms were for five years and were remunerated.

The Encyclopædia Britannica Eleventh Edition considered the franchise "probably the most illiberal in Europe". The working classes were wholly unrepresented in the parliament, only 6% of them, and 13% of the small trading class, possessing the franchise, which was only enjoyed by 6% of the entire population.

The parliament was summoned annually by the king at Budapest. While official language was Hungarian, but the delegates of Croatia-Slavonia were allowed to use Croatian language in the proceedings. The Hungarian parliament had power to legislate on all matters concerning Hungary, but for Croatia-Slavonia only on matters which concern these provinces in common with Hungary. The executive power was vested in a cabinet responsible to it, consisting of ten ministers, including: the president of the council, the minister for Croatia-Slavonia, a minister ad latum, and the ministers of the interior, of national defence, of education and public worship, of finance, of agriculture, of industry and commerce, and of justice.

== See also ==
- Imperial Council (Austria)

== Sources ==
- Appleton's Annual Cyclopaedia and Register of Important Events, D. Appleton and company, 1899, 69.
