= Christian Museum, Esztergom =

Art museum in Esztergom, Hungary

Coordinates: 47°47′51″N 18°44′5.4″E

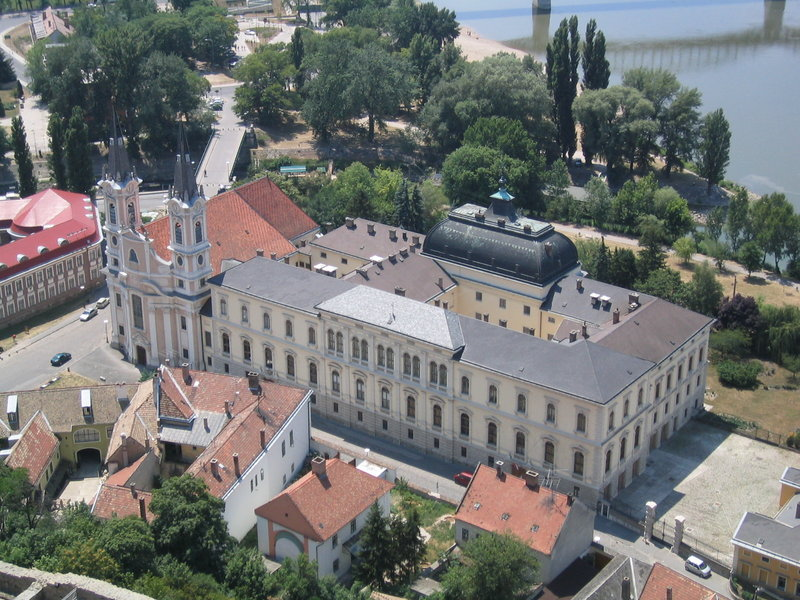
The Christian Museum as seen from the cathedral

The Christian Museum (Hungarian: Keresztény Múzeum) is the largest ecclesiastical collection in Hungary; it conserves European and Hungarian works of art from the period between the 13th and 19th centuries.

The permanent exhibition of the Christian Museum is situated on the second floor of the Primate's Palace in Esztergom-Víziváros, on the bank of the Danube river.

The extensive collections of Hungarian, Italian, Dutch, German and Austrian paintings make this museum the third most important picture gallery in Hungary. Many works of art come from the territory of present-day Slovakia in which area part of the archdiocese of Esztergom lay at the time of the formation of the collection (the 1870s). Besides late medieval and Renaissance works of art — including the Calvary Altarpiece by Thomas of Coloswar, the Lord's Coffin from Garamszentbenedek, and the Passion scenes by Master MS — the baroque and modern collections, the collection of the decorative arts, and the collection of prints and drawings are significant.

== Collections on permanent display ==
- Hungarian, German and Austrian late Gothic painting and sculpture (15th and 16th centuries)
- Italian Renaissance and Baroque painting (13th to 18th centuries)
- Hungarian, Austrian, and German Baroque painting (17th and 18th centuries)
- Early Netherlandish painting (15th and 16th centuries)
- Tapestries (15th to 20th centuries)
- Icons and Eastern Orthodox metalwork (16th to 20th centuries)
- Select works of the decorative arts – goldsmith works, ivory carvings, clocks, caskets and snuff boxes, ceramic art, glass paintings, eastern knotted carpets (12th to 20th centuries)

== History ==
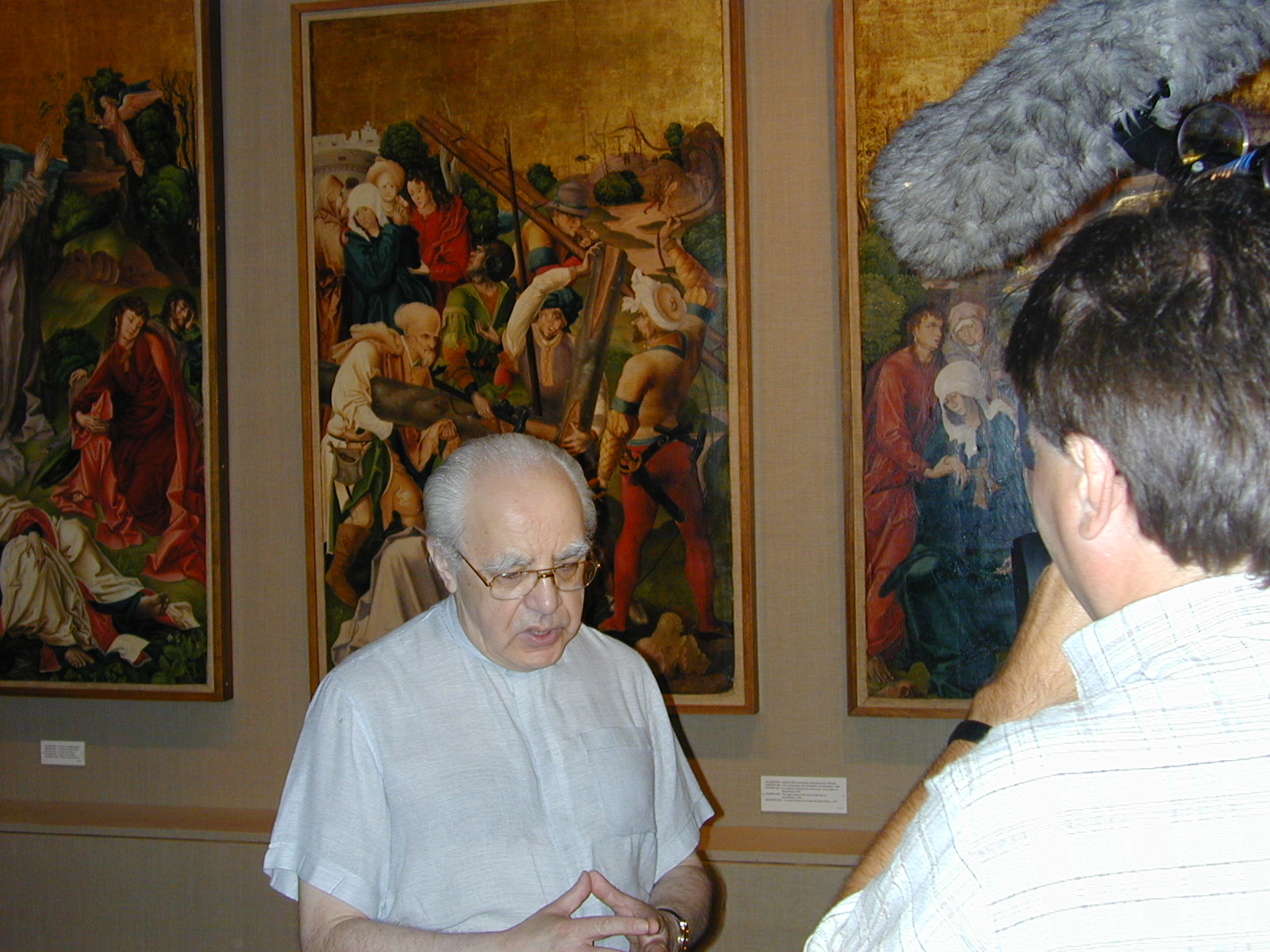
Pál Cséfalvay, canon gives an interview in the museum

The Keresztény Múzeum was founded by archbishop János Simor (1813–1891) who in 1875 established the third public museum of the Kingdom of Hungary by opening his private collection to all visitors. The first exhibition installed on the upper floor of the Cathedral Library included 206 pictures, mainly late medieval and 19th-century works. The Archbishop greatly enlarged his collection in the following years. His most significant purchase was that of the Bertinelli collection in Rome in 1878, when the museum acquired sixty, mainly Italian Renaissance paintings. Further important acquisitions were the wooden sculptures and works of applied art bought in 1884 from the Schnütgen Collection in Cologne. After 1882, the enlarged collection was transferred to the second floor of the newly rebuilt Primate's Palace on the Danube bank, where it is still located. In 1887, Simor ensured the future of the collection by entrusting it to the care of the Cathedral chapter of Esztergom. After World War I, the museum was enriched with two large collections: in 1920 with the collection of Arnold Ipolyi, Bishop of Oradea (1823–1886), which consisted mainly of late medieval Italian, German, Austrian and Hungarian paintings and sculptures, and in 1925 with Count San Marco's bequest, which primarily contained works of applied arts and paintings.

== See also ==
- List of Jesuit sites
