= Max Lehrs =

German art historian

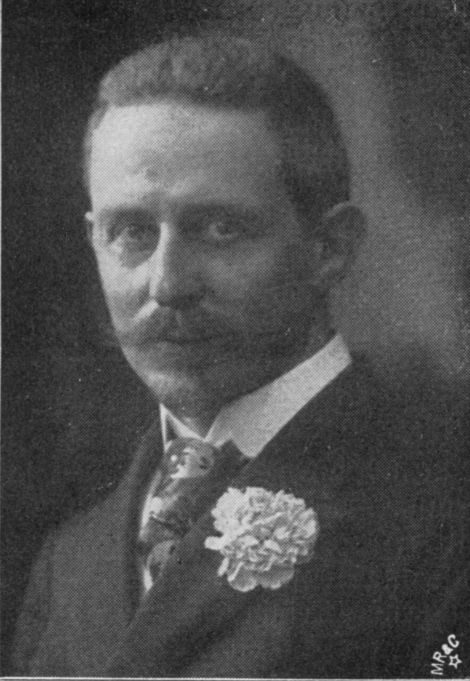
Max Lehrs, 1904

Max Lehrs (24 June 1855, in Berlin – 12 November 1938, in Dresden) was a German art historian and long-time director of the Dresden Kupferstichskabinett, 1896–1904, and 1908–24, with the intervening as director in Berlin. He is especially noted for his work on 15th-century German and Dutch engravers, and the numbers from his catalogues are still the most commonly used in modern references for many artists. Lehrs went blind while still writing his works, which were completed with the help of his daughter and his memory, leading to some lapses in late works.
