= Svätý Anton =

Svätý Anton Szentantal
- Municipality
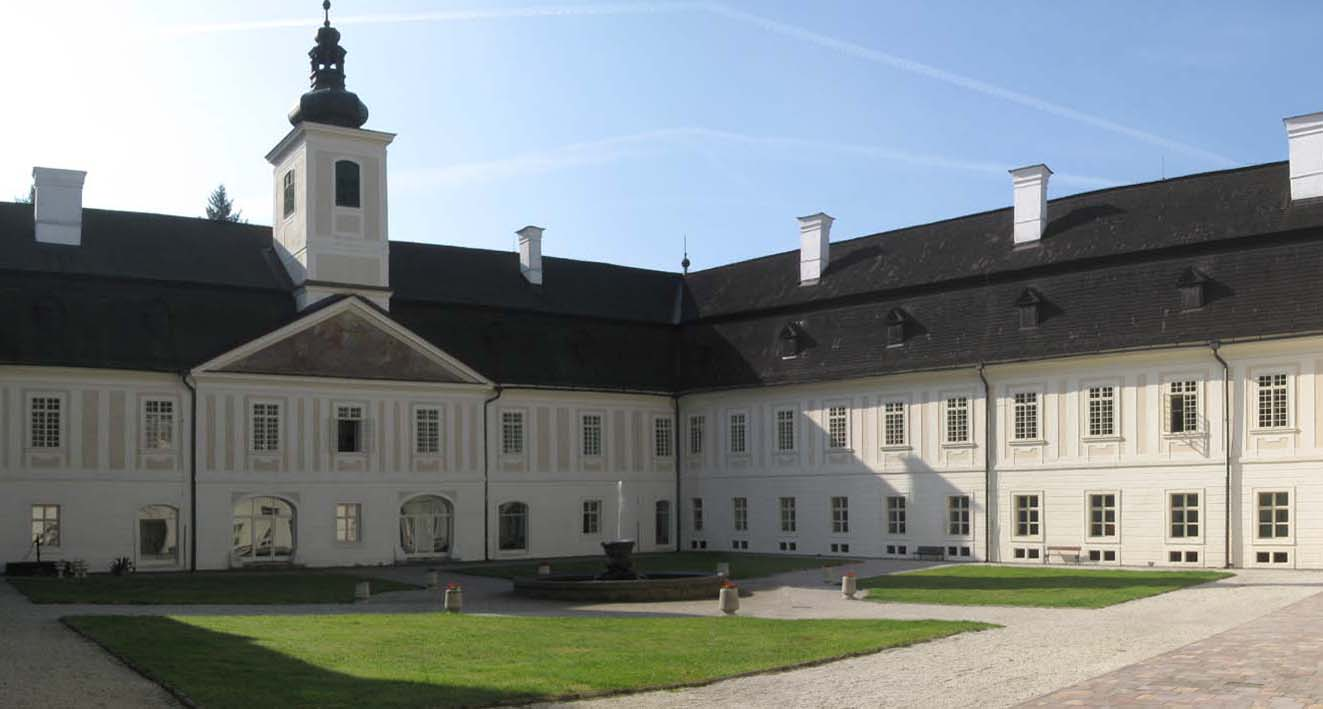

- Flag

- Location of Svätý Anton in the Banská Bystrica Region Location of Svätý Anton in Slovakia
- Coordinates: 48.42°N 18.94°E
- Country: Slovakia
- Region: Banská Bystrica Region
- District: Banská Štiavnica District
- First mentioned: 1266

Government
  - Mayor: Simona Guláková

Area
  - Total: 22.60 km^{2} (8.73 sq mi)
- Elevation: 435 m (1,427 ft)

Population (2025)
  - Total: 1,290
- Time zone: UTC+1 (CET)
  - Summer (DST): UTC+2 (CEST)
- Postal code: 969 72
- Area code: +421 45
- Vehicle registration plate (until 2022): BS
- Website: www.svatyanton.sk

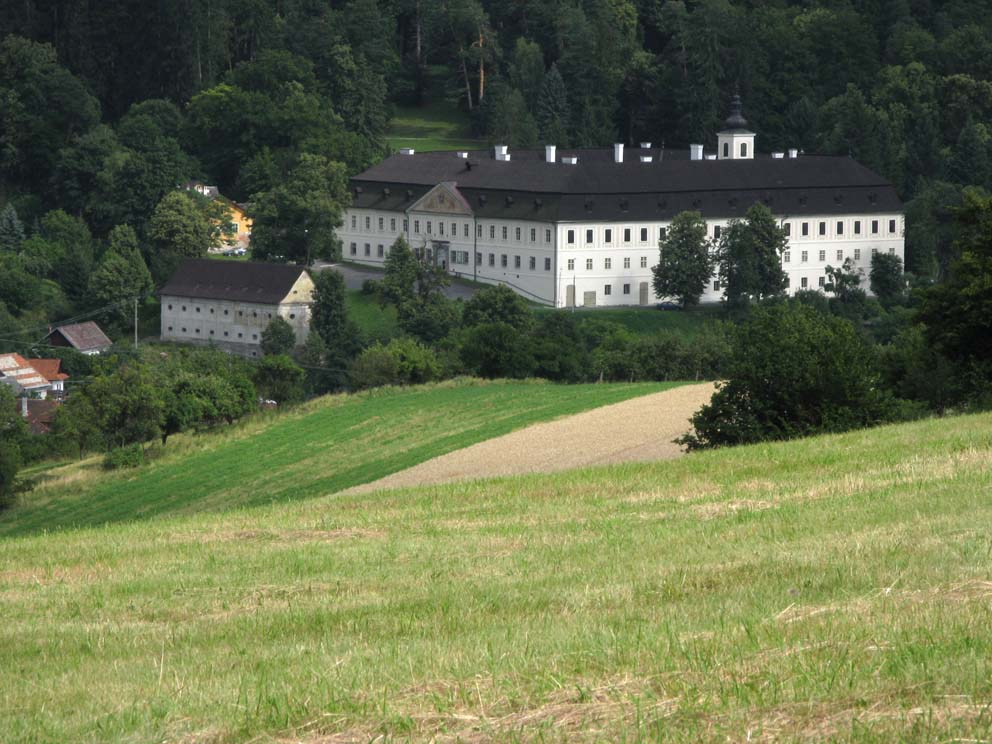
The manor house in St. Anton.

Svätý Anton (lit. 'St. Anthony'; Hungarian: Szentantal) is a village in Banská Štiavnica District in the Banská Bystrica Region of central Slovakia. It is situated near the historic town of Banská Štiavnica. During the period of Communist Czechoslovakia, the village had to use the name Antol as a part of anti-religious campaigns. The first mention of Svätý Anton in written sources dates to 1266, when the village was owned by the Hont-Pázmány family of the Čabraď Castle. The last private owner was Ferdinand I of Bulgaria.

== Geography ==
The municipality lies at an altitude of 435 metres (1,427 ft) and covers an area of 22.60 km^{2} (8.73 sq mi) (2025).

== Population ==
Population statistic (10 years)
Year	1995	2005	2015	2025
Count	1132	1189	1206	1290
Difference		+5.03%	+1.42%	+6.96%

Population statistic
Year	2024	2025
Count	1284	1290
Difference		+0.46%

It has a population of 1290 people (31 December 2025).

=== Ethnicity ===
Census 2021 (1+ %)
Ethnicity	Number	Fraction
Slovak	1157	94.68%
Not found out	59	4.82%
Total	1222	

In year 2021 was 1222 people by ethnicity 1157 as Slovak, 59 as Not found out, 6 as Czech, 4 as Romani, 4 as Hungarian, 2 as Italian, 1 as Serbian, 1 as Russian, 1 as Austrian and 1 as Other.

Note on population: The difference values of population numbers in the table "Population statistic" and in the sections "Ethnicity" & "Religion" is caused by the use of various statistical methods.

=== Religion ===
Census 2021 (1+ %)
Religion	Number	Fraction
Roman Catholic Church	740	60.56%
None	303	24.8%
Not found out	87	7.12%
Evangelical Church	59	4.83%
Total	1222	

In year 2021 was 1222 people by religion 740 from Roman Catholic Church, 303 from None, 87 from Not found out, 59 from Evangelical Church, 10 from Other and not ascertained christian church, 6 from Greek Catholic Church, 5 from Christian Congregations in Slovakia, 5 from Seventh-day Adventist Church, 3 from Ad hoc movements, 2 from Other, 1 from United Methodist Church and 1 from Buddhism.

== Landmarks ==
=== The manor house in Svätý Anton ===
The Svätý Anton manor house was originally built in baroque style as a two-wing building with arcades surrounding an open courtyard with a baroque stone fountain. In the middle of 18th century, Earl Andrej Kohary completed the process of re-building the manor house into a wealthy four-wing noble residence. The Kohary and Coburg families made an essential contribution in the history of the manor house. Here, they concentrated beautiful pieces of artwork and crafts from various parts of the world (18th – 20th centuries). The manor house has served the purpose of a museum since 1962; currently it is a museum of art, history and hunting.

=== Park ===
A park that melts into a forest is part of the manor house estate. Currently, remnants of regular baroque type of treatment can be seen on the terraces near the main building. They loosely melt into landscape park and forested park. The preserved water system of the park is supplied with water from the Kolpassky brook through some kilometres long water gang with aqueducts. Until 1995, the meadow in front of the cage was dominated by an almost 120 years old Giant Sequoya (Sequoiadendron giganteum). Phillip Coburg planted it there in 1878 when his only son Leopold was born. In spite of many attempts to save it, the Sequoya dried. A new and healthy tree was then planted at the entrance to the park in 1996.

=== Svätý Anton Pustovník church ===
The church was originally built in late baroque style in 1754 – 1755. In the middle of the 19th century it was rebuilt and got its current classicist aspect. The most valuable masterpieces housed in the church are a Madonna sculpture and a monumental panel painting signed by master M.S. dating from 1506.

== Notable residents ==
- Béla Grünwald, Hungarian politician and historian
- Karol Zachar, artist
