= Mair von Landshut =

German painter

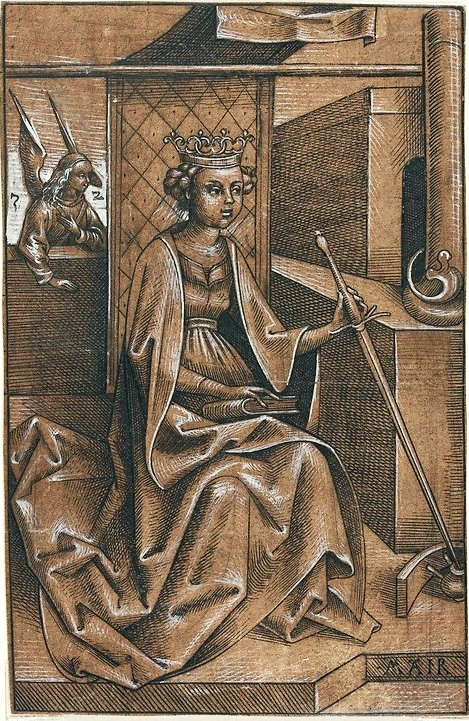
St. Catherine, engraving on brown prepared paper with white highlights added; signed "MAIR".

Mair von Landshut (active c. 1485–1504 or later) was a German engraver, painter, and designer of woodcuts, who worked in Bavaria. He probably came from Freising near Munich, and worked in both towns, as well as Landshut.

Twenty-five of his prints are known: three woodcuts and 22 engravings, most signed "MAIR". Ten of them are dated 1499. What his prints lack in terms of drawing and technique, compared to Martin Schongauer or Israhel van Meckenem further north and some years earlier, they often make up for in being "imaginative and charming".

While his images, produced over the period when the young Albrecht Dürer was revolutionizing German graphic style, essentially look back to the late Gothic world of the Master of the Housebook, his innovative experiments with colouring prints were followed up by many German printmakers in the next century. He is most unusual in adding colour to some prints, apparently by his own hand. Many 15th-century prints were coloured (often removed by 19th-century collectors or dealers) but this is normally regarded as something done later by other hands. He aimed to achieve the effect of drawings heightened with colour, and like many of these, he used "prepared" coloured paper. Later, the chiaroscuro woodcut would achieve very similar effects by using multiple blocks.

No paintings by him can be documented, but a small number (about 13) are attributed to him based on similarities with the style of the prints. There are also some drawings attributed on the same basis, and two signed.

== Known biographical facts ==
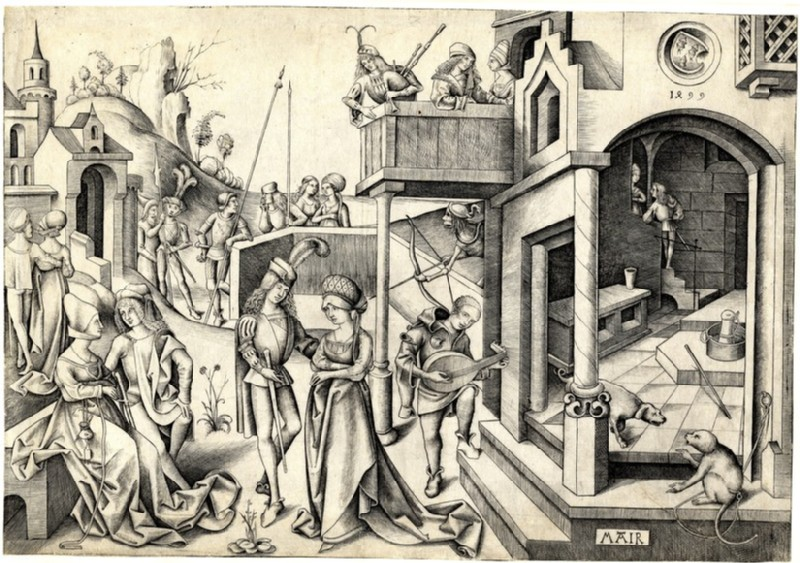
The Hour of Death, engraving, signed and dated 1499. Death with bow and arrow lurks at the centre of this "Garden of Love" scene.

His life is only documented by a few records. Working backwards from these, he was probably born around 1450. Possibly he trained with Michael Pacher in the Tyrol. A "Mair maler [painter] von Freising" paid tax in Munich in 1490. He may have come there to help Jan Polack, the leading Munich painter of the day, with his large "Saint Peter Altarpiece", two panels of which are attributed to Mair. In 1495 he painted a lunette panel for the sacristy of the cathedral in Freising. In 1497 he is referred to in city records in Augsburg as a painter and citizen of Freising.

Anna Holbein, the mother of Hans Holbein the Elder (born around 1460), was Mair's sister.

One of the engravings dated 1499 includes the coat of arms of Landshut, as does the watermark on the paper of another. He also seems to have collaborated with Hans Wurm, a printer and blockcutter there, who probably cut the woodcuts. His last datable work is a drawing of 1504. George the Rich, the last Duke of Bavaria-Landshut, maintained a famously lavish court at Landshut, until his death without a male heir in 1503 brought disaster to the area, with the Imperial armies of Maximilian I, Holy Roman Emperor devastating it in the War of the Succession of Landshut (1503–05). It is thought that the majority of his prints were produced over a few years Mair spent in around Landshut around 1499.

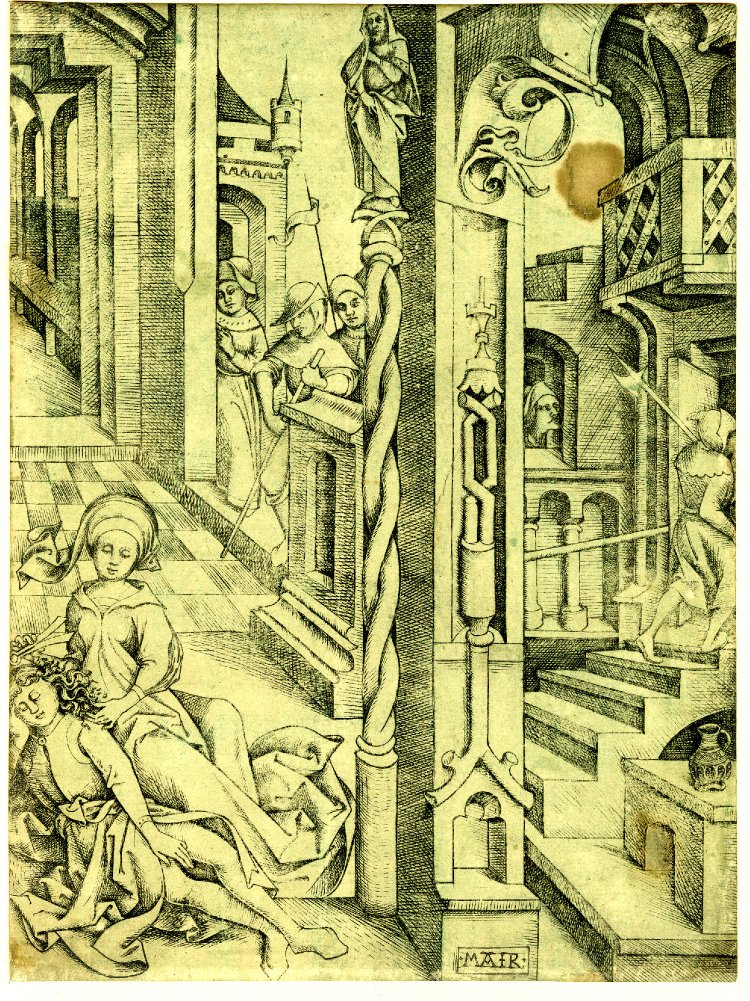
Samson and Delilah; Samson lies while Delilah cuts his hair off. Engraving on light-green prepared paper, British Museum.

There is a painter documented in Landshut in 1492, 1499 and 1514 called "Nicolaus Alexander Mair", but while some scholars see him as the same person as Mair von Landshut, others do not. German-language sources often call him "Nikolaus Alexander Mair von Landshut", as the Albertina does. He is also sometimes given the first name Hans, for no very good reason. Modern sources give a number of death dates, on no good evidence, from 1504 (his last dated work), to 1514 (last record of Nicolaus Alexander Mair) to 1520.

His prints are mostly very rare, with nine of them surviving only in a single impression, but some of his plates survived to be reprinted in the late sixteenth century, and perhaps still more recently.

== Style ==
Mair favours complicated and "fantastic architectural spaces, with walls joining at the most unlikely angles. The scenes resemble whimsical stage sets, and are endowed with an unreal character, like something from a fairy tale." Apart from conventional religious scenes, which often also have the fanciful architectural settings, there are engravings of couples and some unusual and original images, combining glamorous figures with a moralizing theme. His Annunciation, surviving in a unique impression in Washington, "is remarkable for its ambitious but confused perspective, apparently the result of a desire to reference a number of rather complex theological issues". The composition attempts to combine the architecture of a church with that of a bedroom, and "the foreground of the composition is further complicated by several ill-foreshortened sets of steps that distort the bed-altar area, giving it the elevation of a shrine." Its "spatial clumsiness" has suggested it is his earliest print.

Some engravings survive in conventional black on white examples, and ones printed on paper "prepared", or tinted with watercolour (as in the Sampson and Delilah illustrated), and sometimes painted highlights as well (as in the St Catherine at top). The colours added by brush include white, yellow and red. Another impression of the Sampson and Delilah, in Vienna, is printed on brown prepared paper with brushed-in highlights in white and yellow. The same treatment is given to impressions of a Nativity dated 1499, in the National Gallery of Art, and also the British Museum. The same print is illustrated here in a conventional black on whte impression in New York (with others in Vienna and the British Museum). Altogether, impressions of fourteen of his prints on prepared coloured paper have survived.

Wolfgang Stechow, who first set out the history and depiction of the story, describes his print of The Dead King and his Three Sons as the "most subtle and moving interpretation of the story in art, despite its many awkward details".

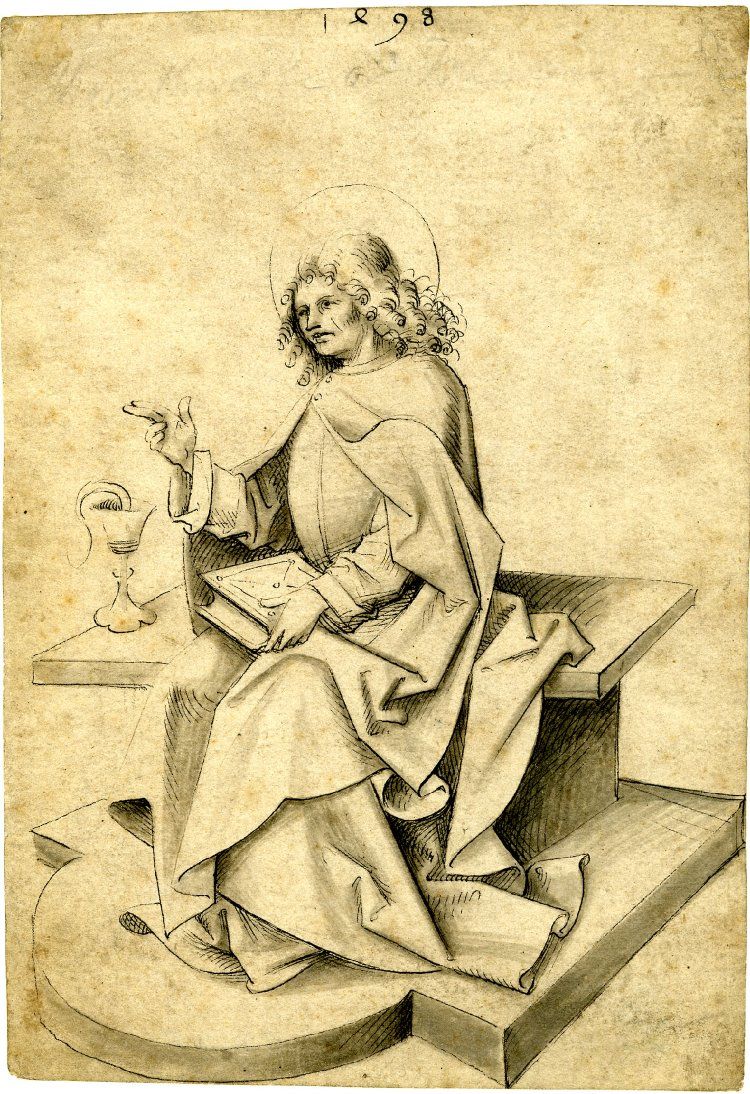
Drawing of Saint John the Evangelist, 1498

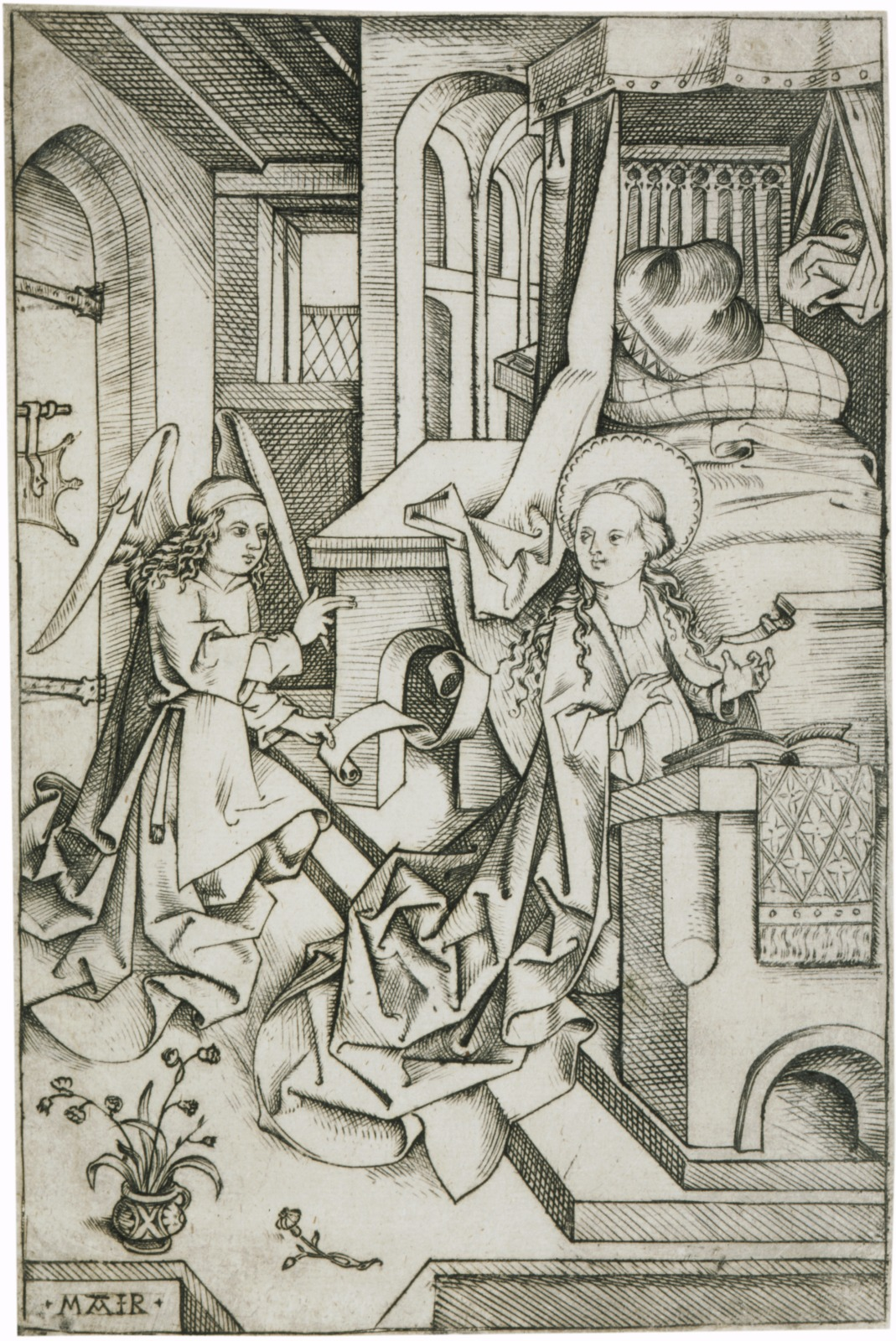
Annunciation, see text

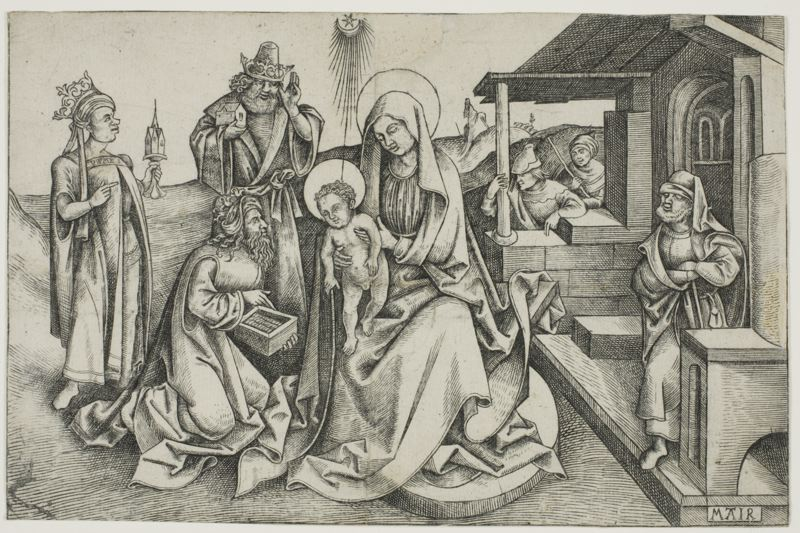
Adoration of the Magi, signed engraving

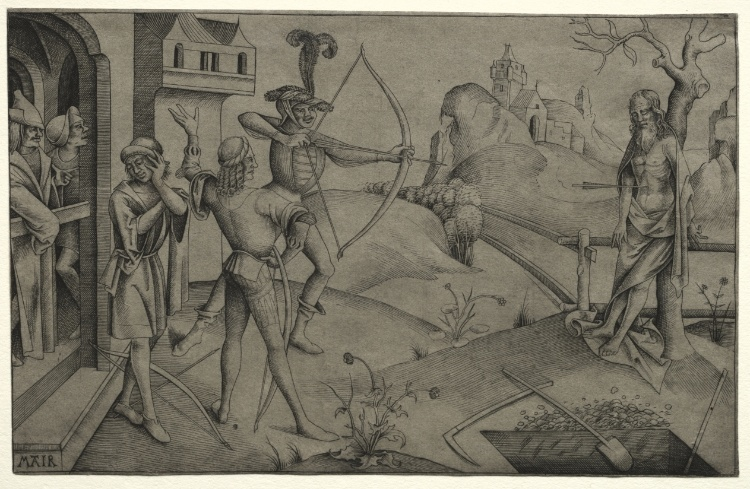
The Dead King and his Three Sons, signed engraving

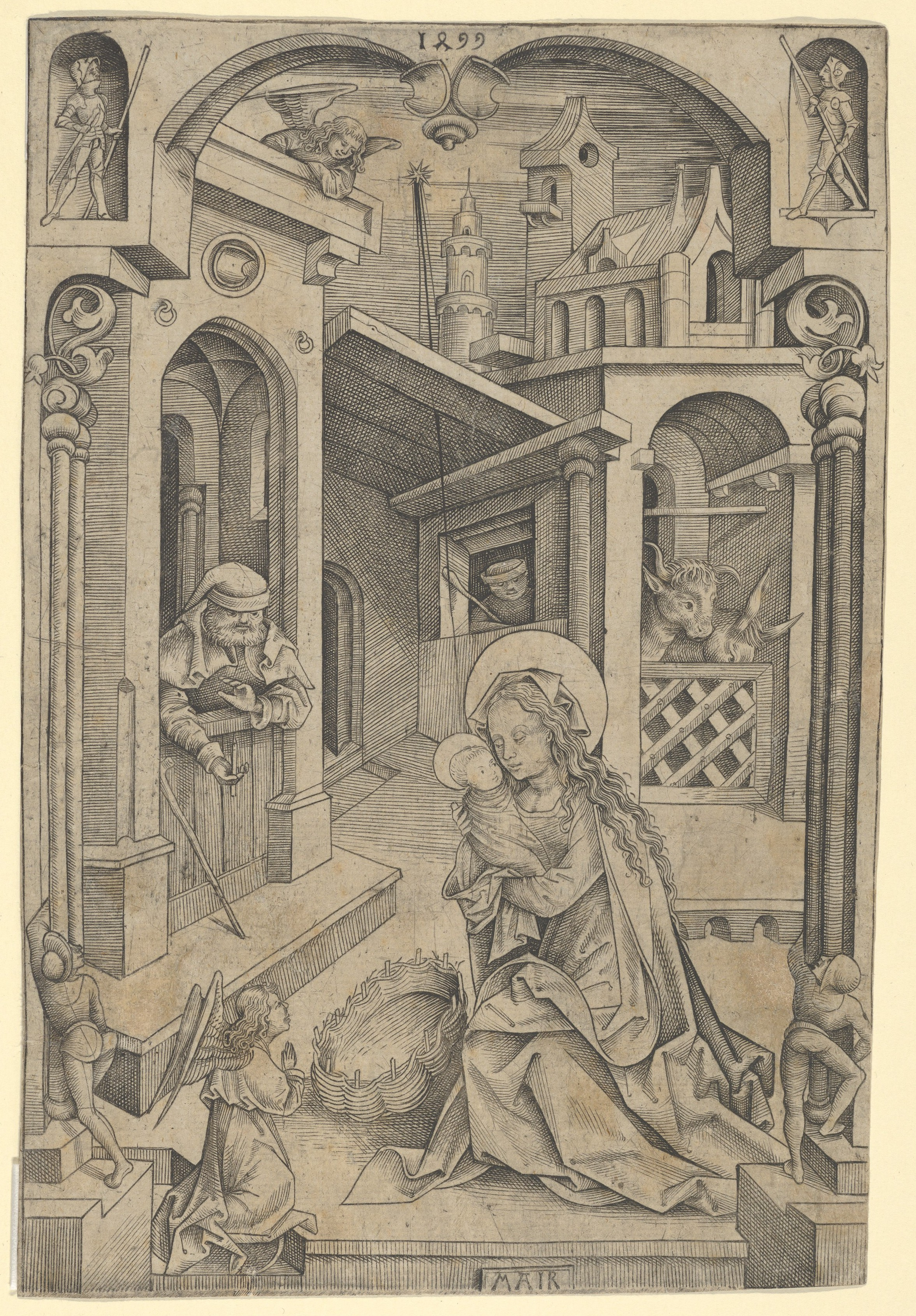
Nativity, engraving, signed and dated 1499

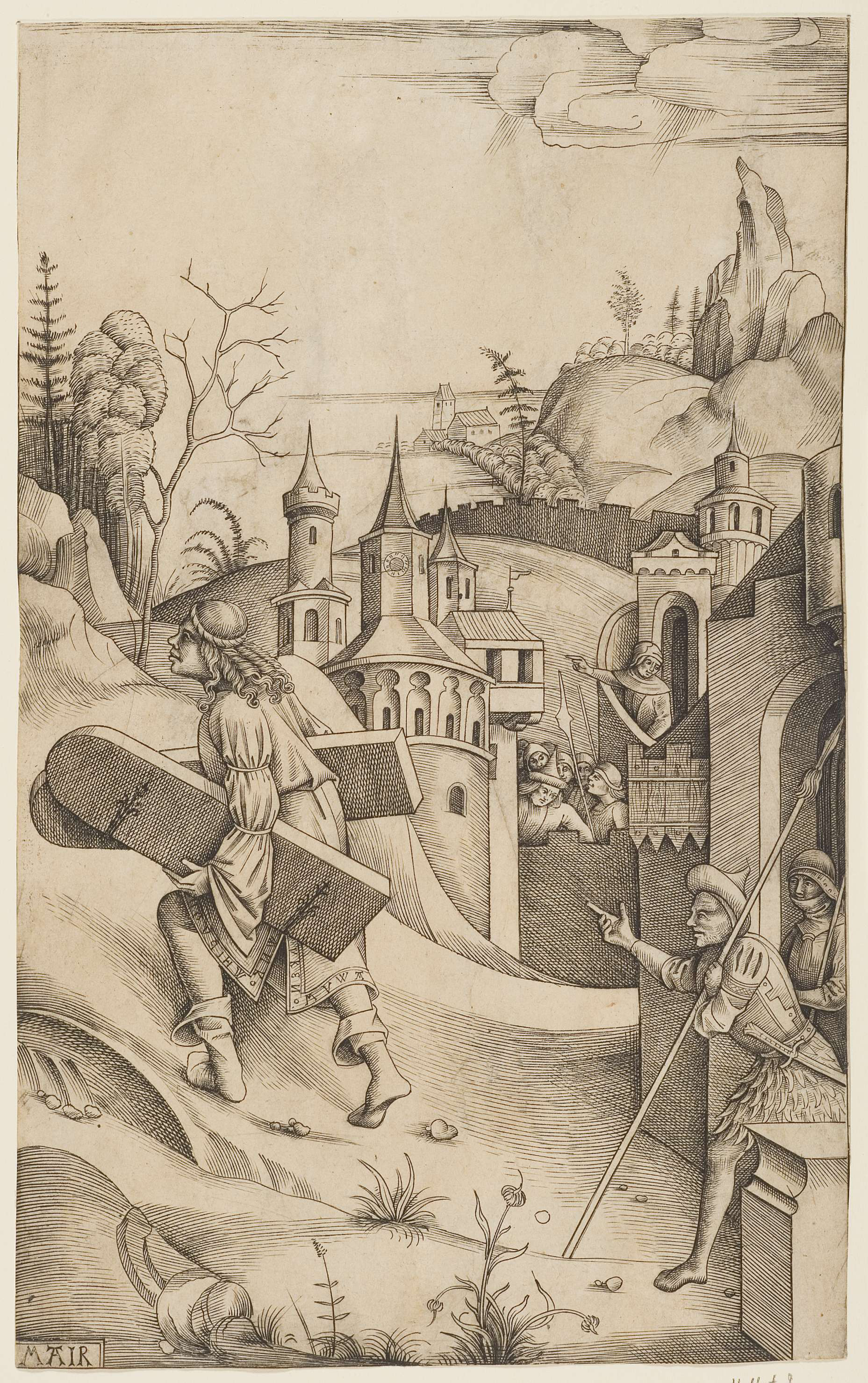
Samson with the doors of Gaza, signed engraving

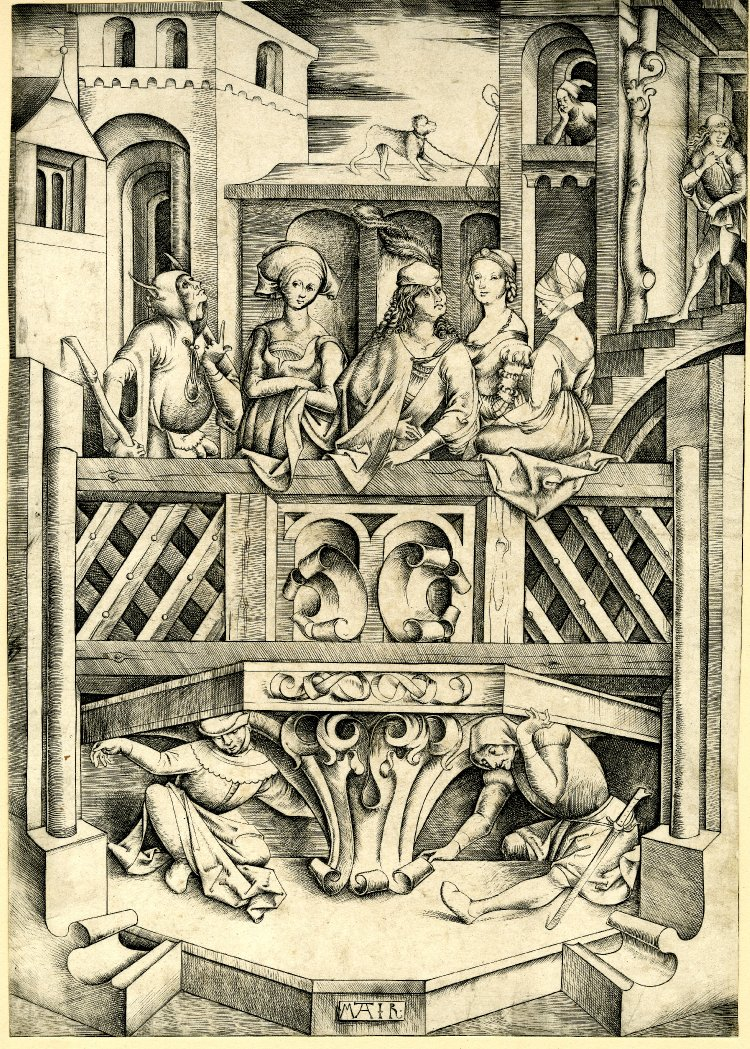
The Balcony; a young man is surrounded by three courtesans and a jester. Engraving

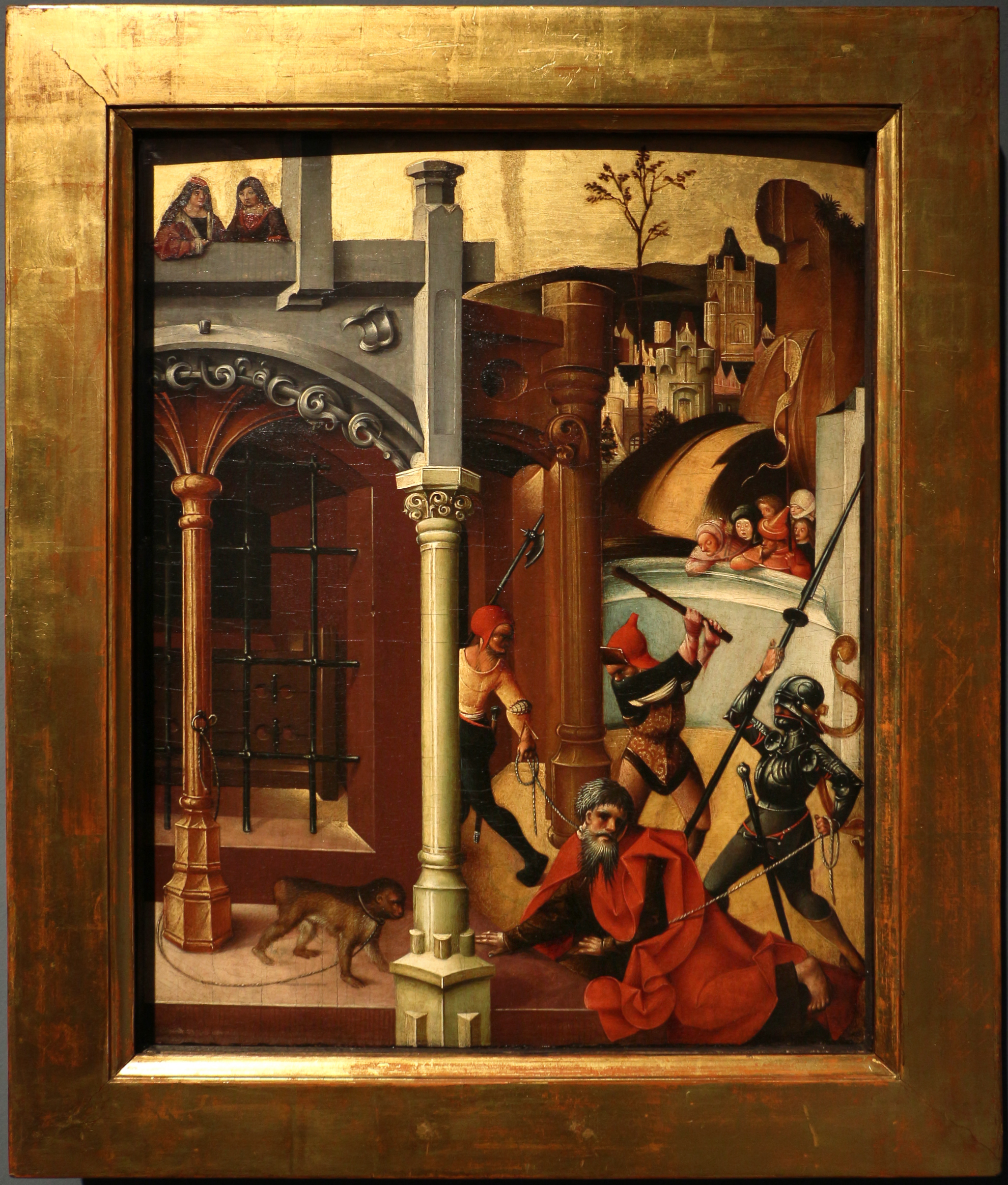
Martyrdom of Saint Jude Thaddeus, Museo Poldi Pezzoli

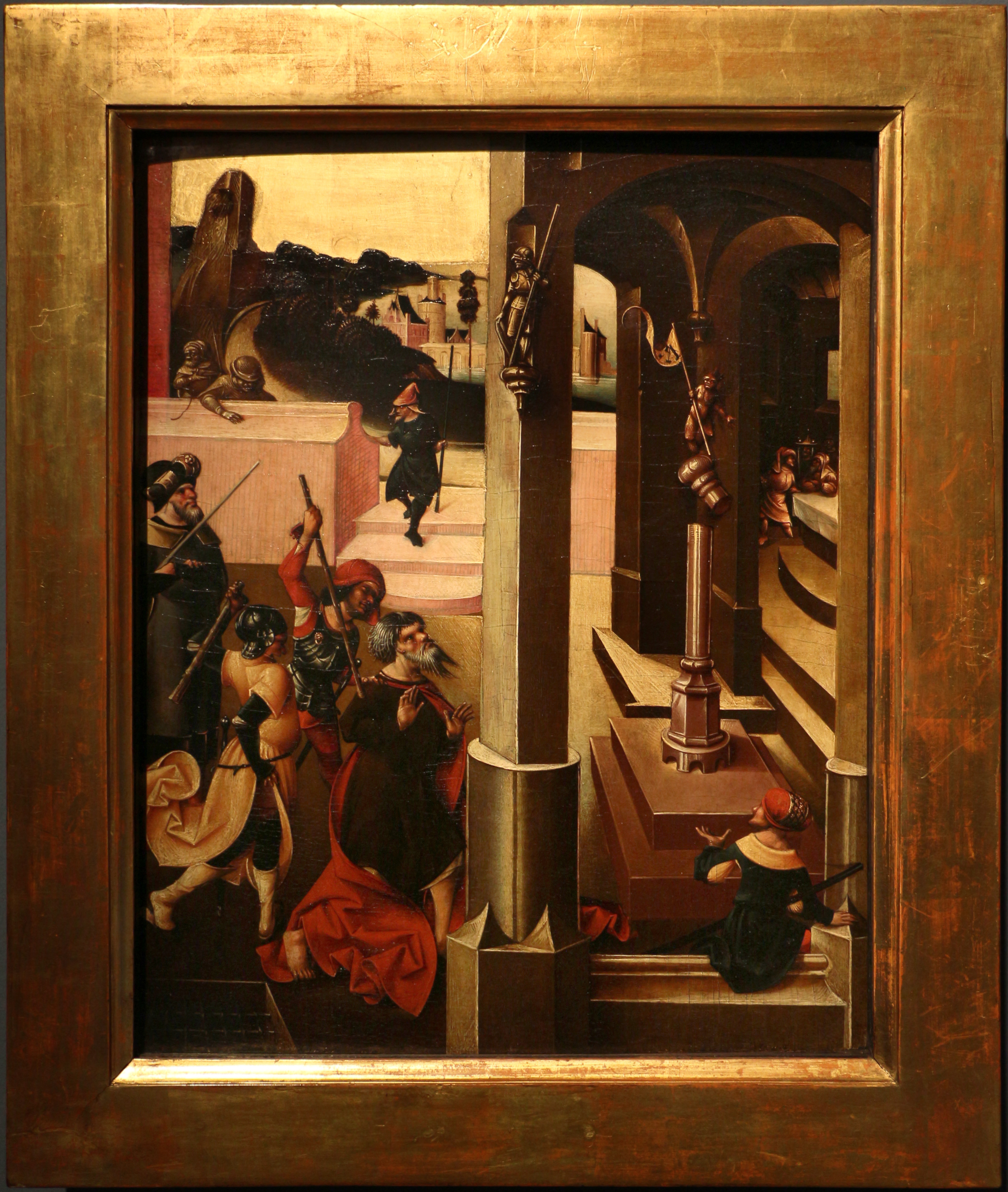
Martyrdom of Saint Jude Thaddeus, Museo Poldi Pezzoli

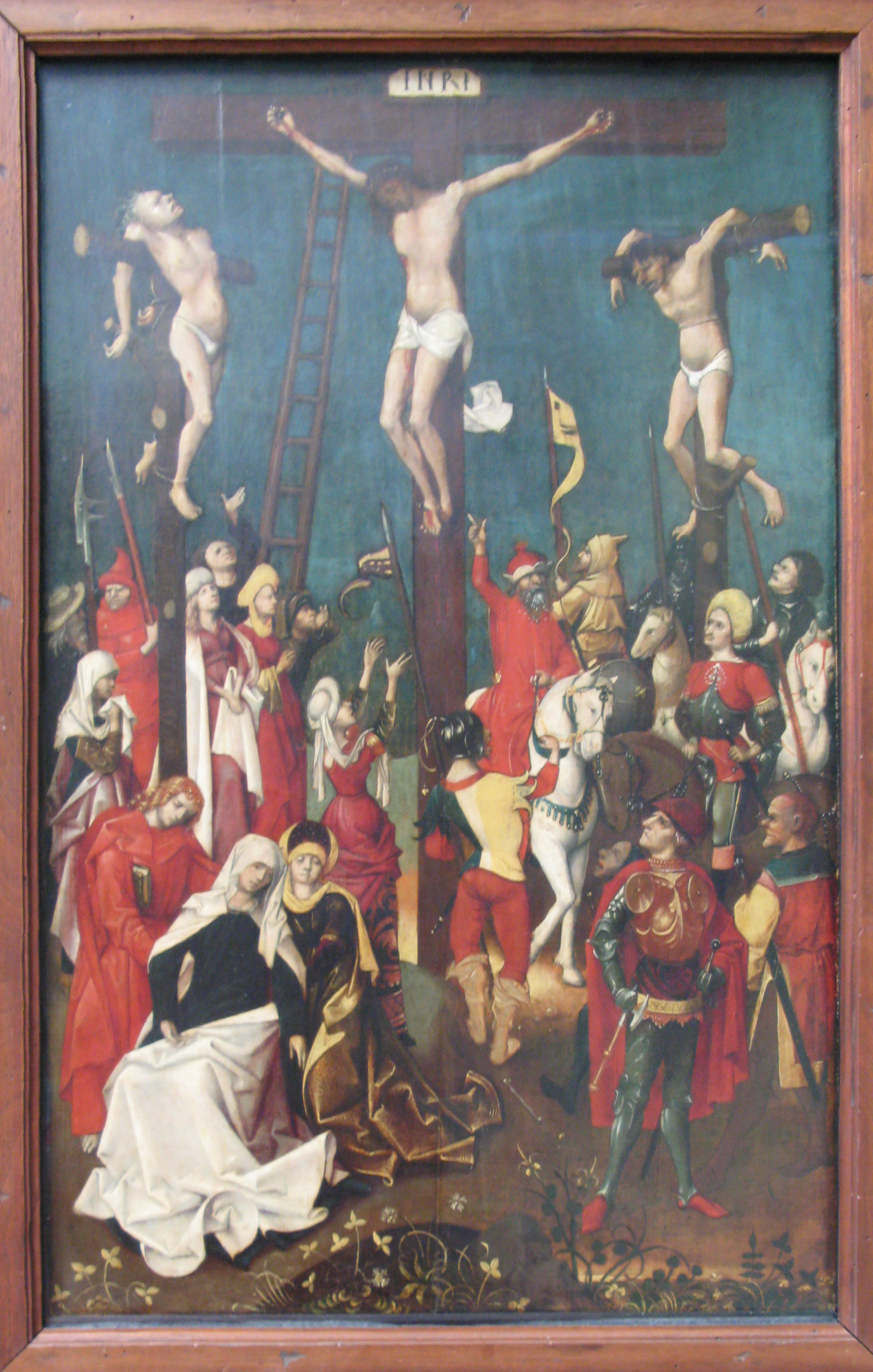
Crucifixion, Gemäldegalerie

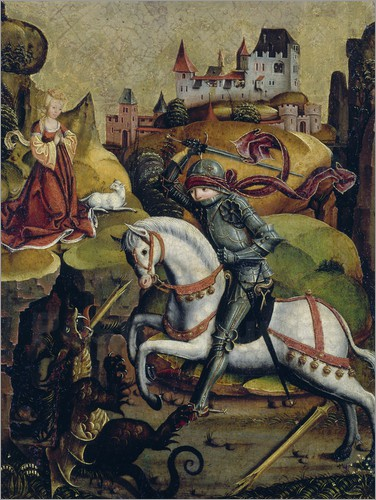
Saint George and the Dragon, Alte Pinakothek
