= Landshut Wedding =

Quadrennial historical pageant in Bavaria

Coordinates: 48.5397°N 12.1508°E

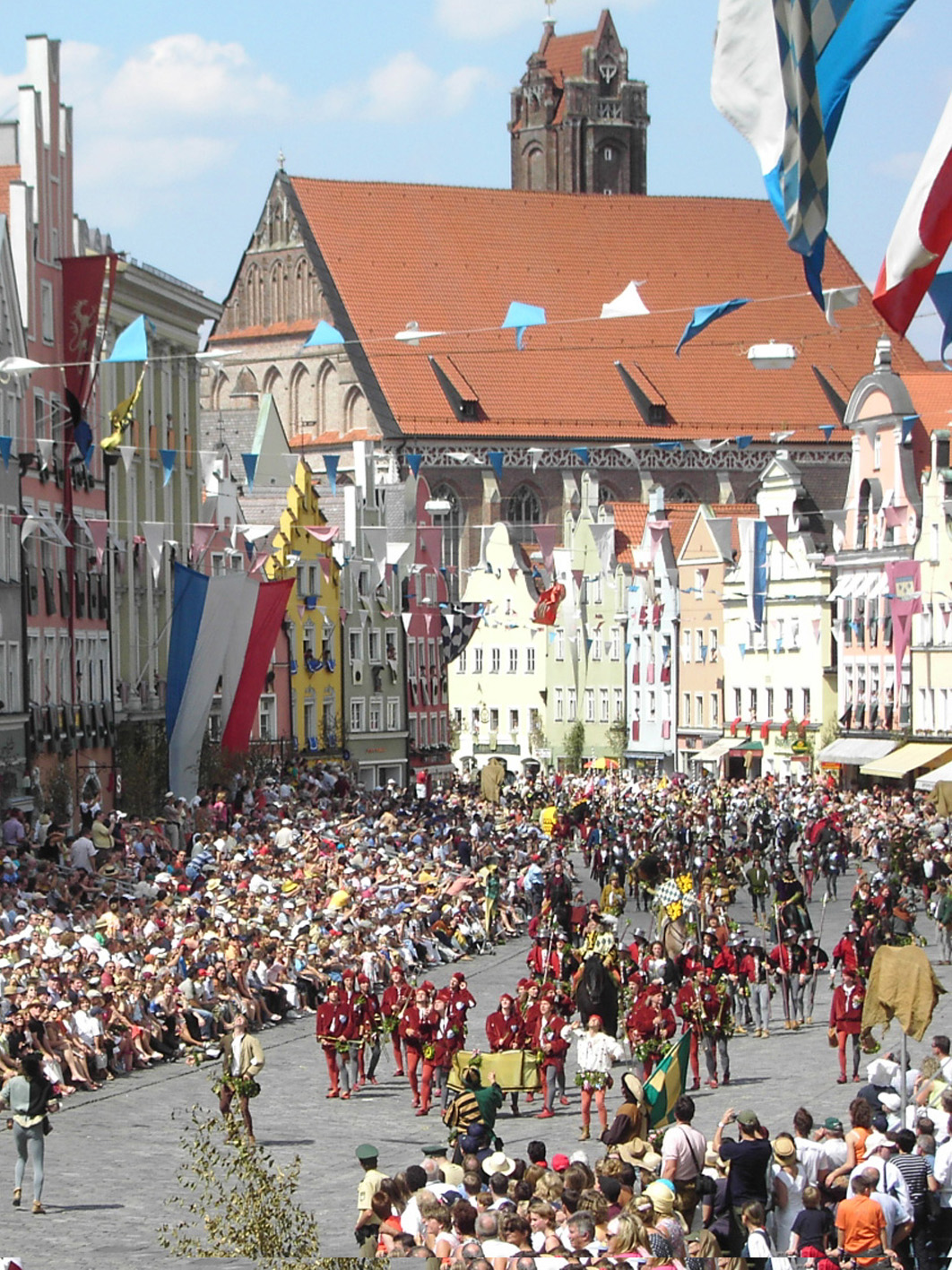
Part of the Landshut Wedding of 2005

The Landshut Wedding (German: Landshuter Hochzeit), held every four years in Landshut, Bavaria, is one of the largest historical pageants in Europe. It commemorates the wedding between Hedwig Jagiellon, daughter of the King of Poland, and George, the son of the Duke of Bavaria at Landshut.

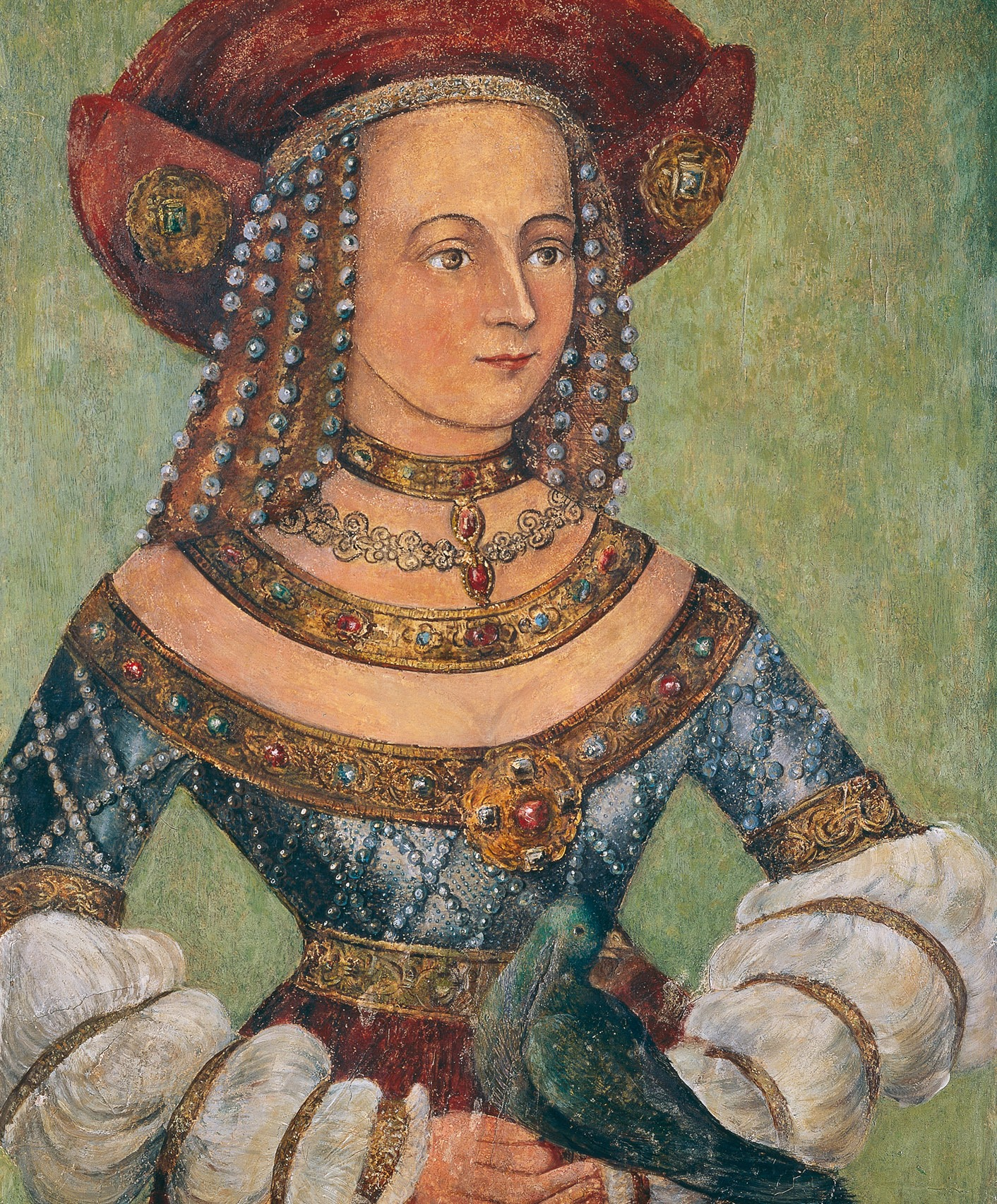
Hedwig Jagiellon, possibly by Mair von Landshut

== History ==
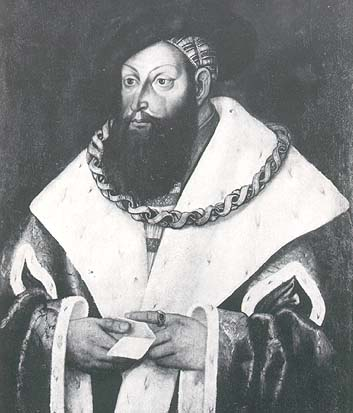
George the Rich, painted well after his death

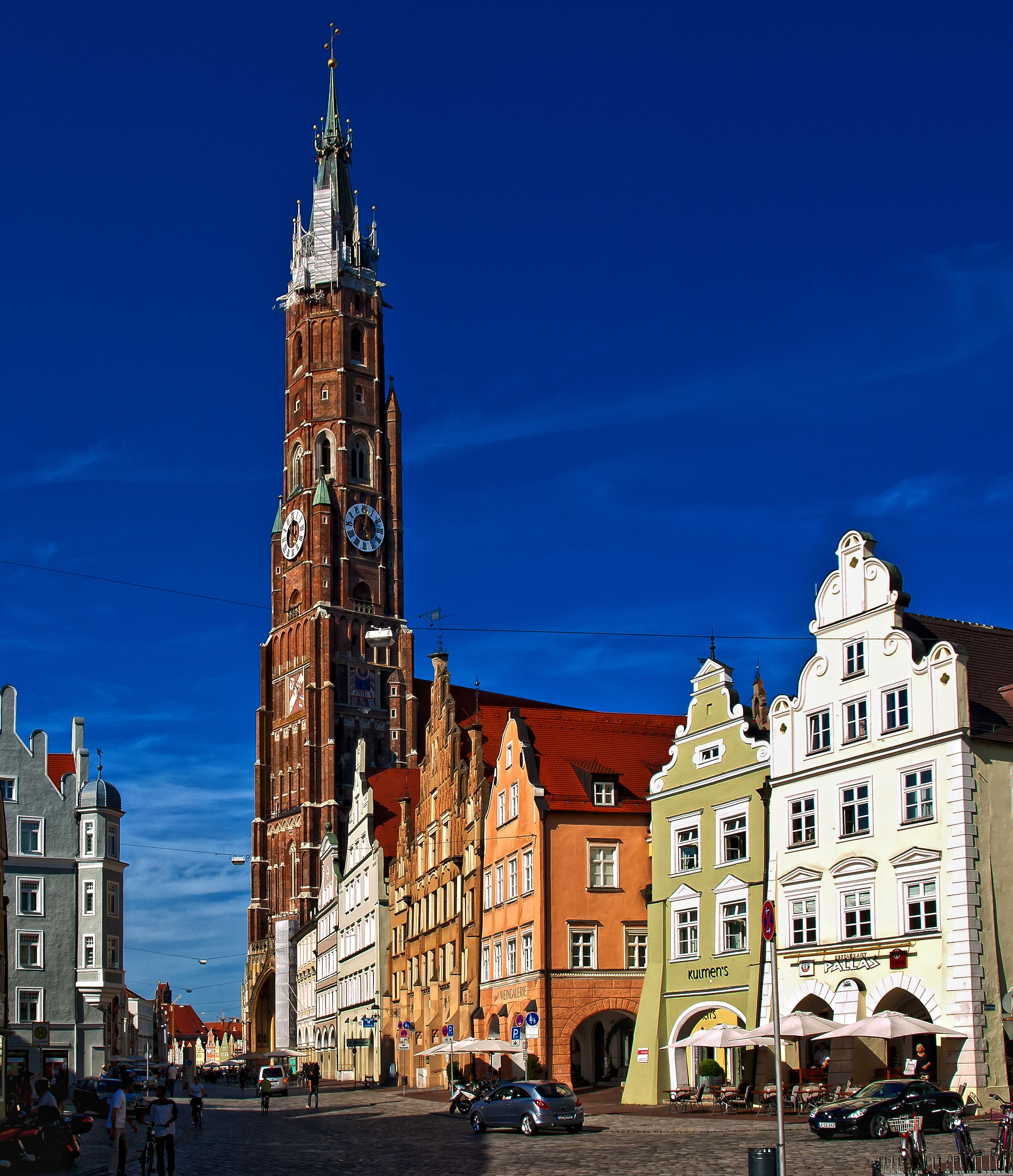
S. Martin's Church in Landshut

The festival is held in memory of the wedding between George of Bavaria, the son of the Bavarian duke, and Hedwig Jagiellon, daughter of King Casimir IV Jagiellon of Poland, in 1475.

The wedding was negotiated in 1474 in Radom through legations. The marriage was important because it was seen as a strong alliance against the Ottoman Turks. At the time, most royal marriages were not entered into because of love, but because of political motivations. It took the bride two months to travel to Landshut, where she was received by princes and bishops.

The bridal pair were married in St. Martin's Church, and the service was officiated by Salzburg's Archbishop Bernhard von Rohr. Afterwards the bridal procession proceeded through the Old Town to the Town Hall. Ten thousand people are said to have attended the affair and they were provided food and drink by the young duke's father.

Livestock eaten at the original festival:

- 320 bullocks
- 1,500 sheep
- 1,300 lambs
- 500 calves
- 40,000 chickens

The historic event is notable for its detailed records that yield a complete chronicle of the wedding days and which allows the re-enactment to have a touch of realism. The exact recordings can be explained from the historical context with the Fall of Constantinople in 1453 which led into a longer period of growth of the Ottoman Empire. The marriage of the Polish princess with George "the Rich" was profitable for the Polish king - the 32,000 Guilder bride wealth he received would be worth about 6.5 million euros in modern currency.

== Recreation ==
The original motivation for the festival dates back to the foundation of the German Reich in 1871 which furthered German national pride. In the years 1876 to 1880 the Landshut town hall was renovated and in the years 1880 to 1882 the celebration room in the town hall was given paintings depicting the Landshut Wedding of 1475, as this room was used as the dance hall for the festivities at that time. From these images the idea arose among citizens to recreate the event and finally the restaurant owner Georg Trippel and the factory owner Joseph Linnbrunner founded a society "Die Förderer" in 1902.

The first Landshut Wedding recreation took place in 1903, only one year after the creation of the society, and largely took the form of a public play performed by 145 citizens taking on a role. The Landshut Wedding play was subsequently presented annually from 1903 to 1914 (paused during World War I) and 1922 to 1938 (paused during World War II). During this time the number of actors involved increased to 2000. The Landshut Wedding became a triennial event from 1950 to 1968 and from 1975 to 1981. Since 1985 the Landshut Wedding has taken place every four years. The festival which would have taken place in 2021 was postponed as a result of the COVID-19 pandemic, taking place in July 2023 instead.

The number of members of "Die Förderer" society rose from 855 to 7146 during the years 1973 to 2013. The renewed interest in medieval history made the event a major success in terms of tourism. Today the 60,000 or so inhabitants of Landshut welcome 600,000 to 700,000 visitors during the three weeks of the festivities, with some 120,000 visitors watching the bridal procession. The sponsors are able to collect money in the range of 3.5 million euros to allow for the event to take place.

In the festival, local citizens act variously as bishops, aristocrats, bride and bridegroom. The actors are chosen from a commission of the "Die Förderer". Every person who wants to become a member of this association and who wants to take part in the festival has to live near Landshut. It is customary among Landshut males to let the hair grow longer in the months before the event to match the medieval fashion better. Every citizen of Landshut will dress in medieval garments during festival days (even wrist watches are frowned upon) and the city’s decoration is retrofitted to a great extent. This of course means that the city becomes a pedestrian-only zone; visitors approaching by car are informed of this at a 50 km perimeter around the town.

Citing concerns surrounding authenticity, visitors are not permitted to wear medieval-themed outfits, but are invited to join in the celebrations dressed in contemporary "civvies".

== Normal schedule of events ==
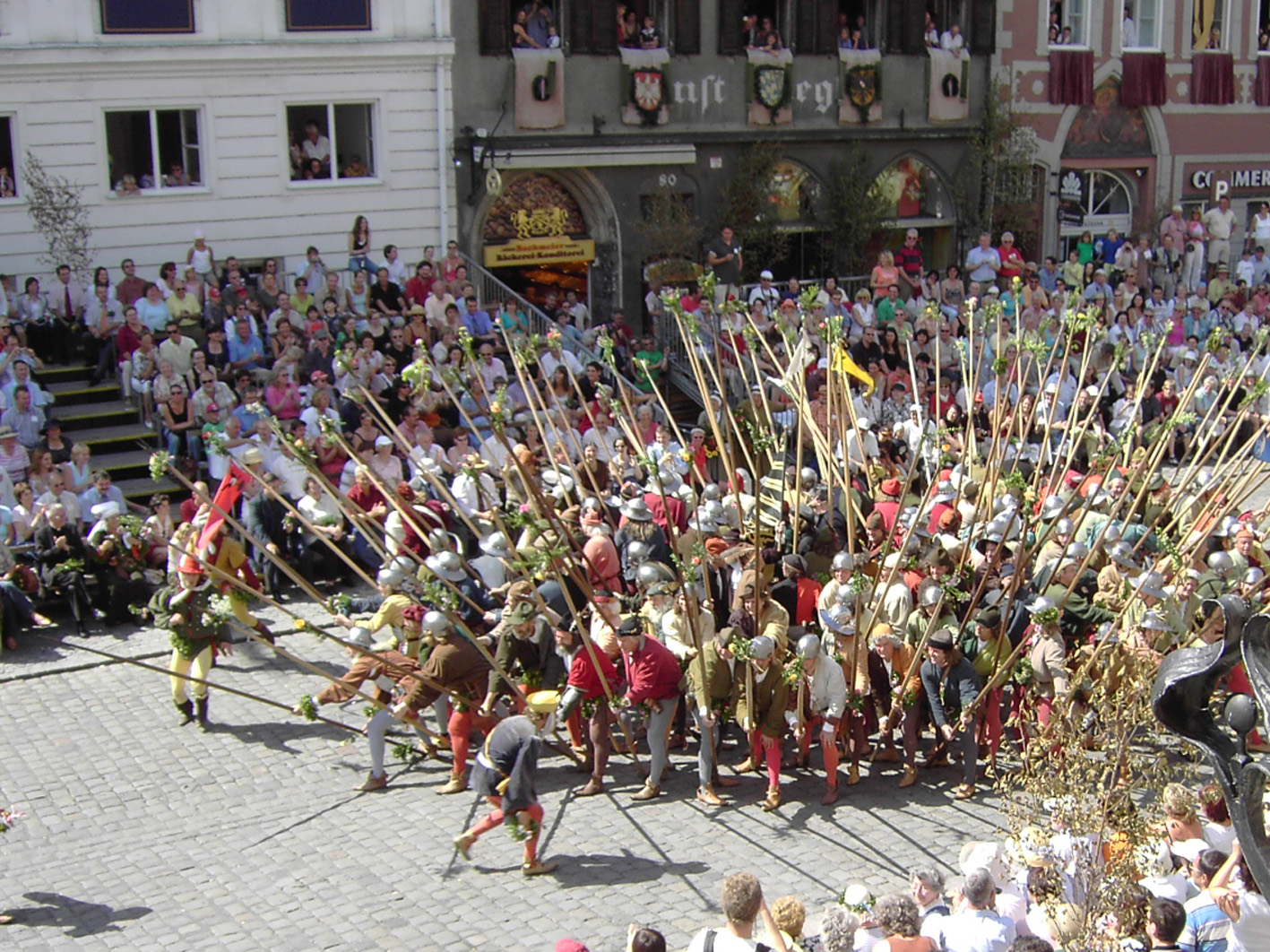
Part of the Landshut Wedding of 2005

=== Wedding procession ===
Time: Sunday afternoon

Place: Dreifaltigkeitsplatz, Altstadt, Postplatz, Bischof-Sailer-Platz, Neustadt, the same way back to the "Turnierplatz"

Around two thousand Landshut people take part in the wedding procession. The guests, such as noblemen, citizens, servants and poor people, move through the city to the church of St. Martin where the archbishop of Salzburg celebrated the marriage ceremony in 1475. After that the procession ends at the Turnierplatz (Tournament place).

=== Games of riders and knights ===
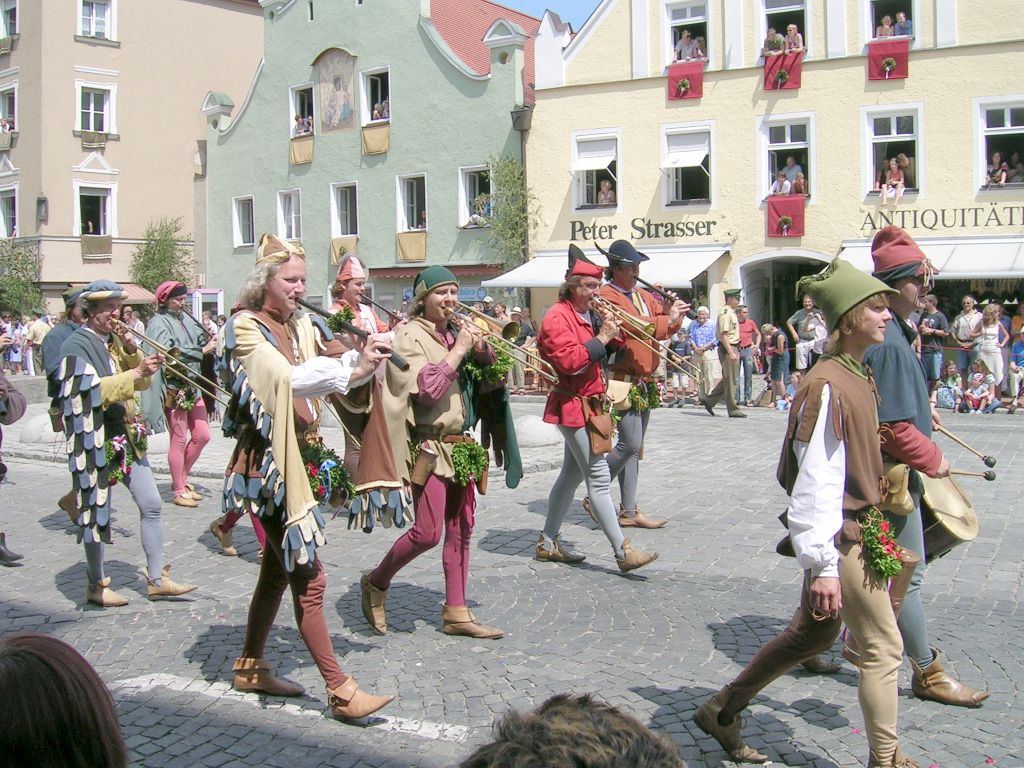
Part of the Landshut Wedding of 2005

Time: Sunday afternoon/evening (after the wedding march)

Place: Turnierplatz (Place of challenge)

The wedding march leads to the field of challenge (Wiesmahd) on which the bride was immediately greeted by her groom. There young noblemen fight in an exciting challenge for the prize of honor which is given by the bride while the other noble guests take their places at a great table.

=== Life in the quarters ===
Time: Friday, Saturday and Sunday evening

Place: Quarters at the place of challenge

The different groups create their quarters near the Turnierplatz, where the wedding guests end the day with music and good food.

=== Festival performances ===
Time: evenings, Sunday morning

Place: "Rathaus-Prunksaal" (Town-Hall)

Visitors witness the preparations for the Wedding, as imagined by a group of actors. Author Leopold Ahlsen’s comedy describes the bride's difficult trip from Kraków to Landshut. Death and plague were the constant companions on the march from Poland to Germany.

=== Dance performances ===
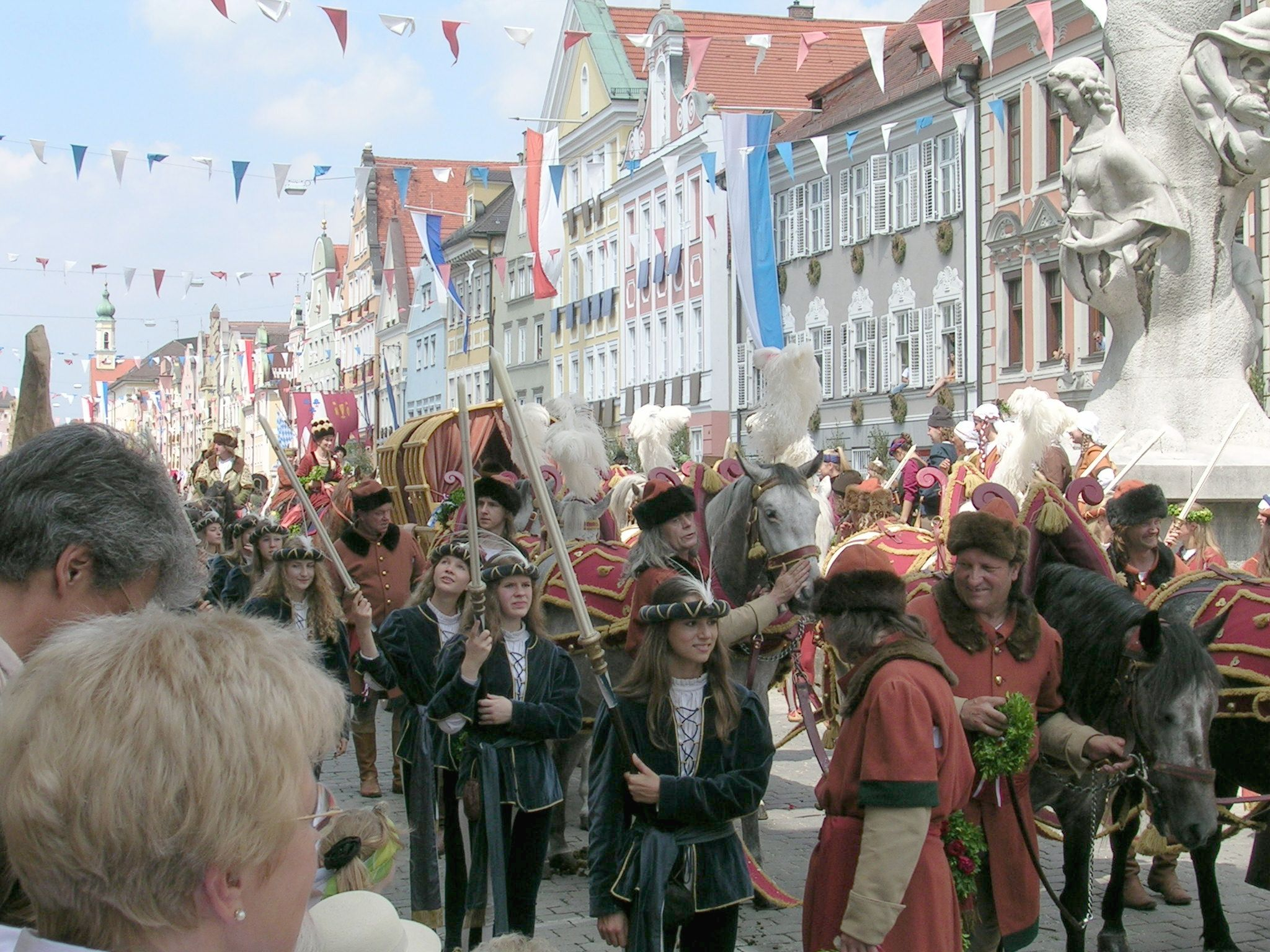
Part of the Landshut Wedding of 2005

Time: evenings

Place: After the festival performances in the town hall

At the festival evening the groom and his bride meet the noble guests for dancing. Different groups perform their dances; for example, the exotic dance of the Moors.

=== Festival games in the nightly quarters ===
Time: Saturday evening

Place: Place of challenge

The day before the Wedding thousands of guests have reached Landshut after a long trip and have to pass the time until the wedding day. They are in their quarters, in bars, or are entertained by games and shows by different artists like tumblers and fire-eaters.

=== Music in 1475 ===
Time: Saturday and Sunday morning

Place: Residenz

The "Landshuter Hofkapelle" band offers 15th century music as it used to be played in bars and especially at noble festivals.

=== "Laudate Dominum" ===
Time: Saturday evening

Place: Church St. Jodok

A choir, called "Ad libitum", perform a concert. It focuses on works of famous composers like Pierre de la Rue, Guillaume Dufay and Josquin des Prez, who was one of the most significant composers in the Middle Ages in Europe. The performance in St. Jodok also comprises short instrumental pieces.

=== Masquerade ===
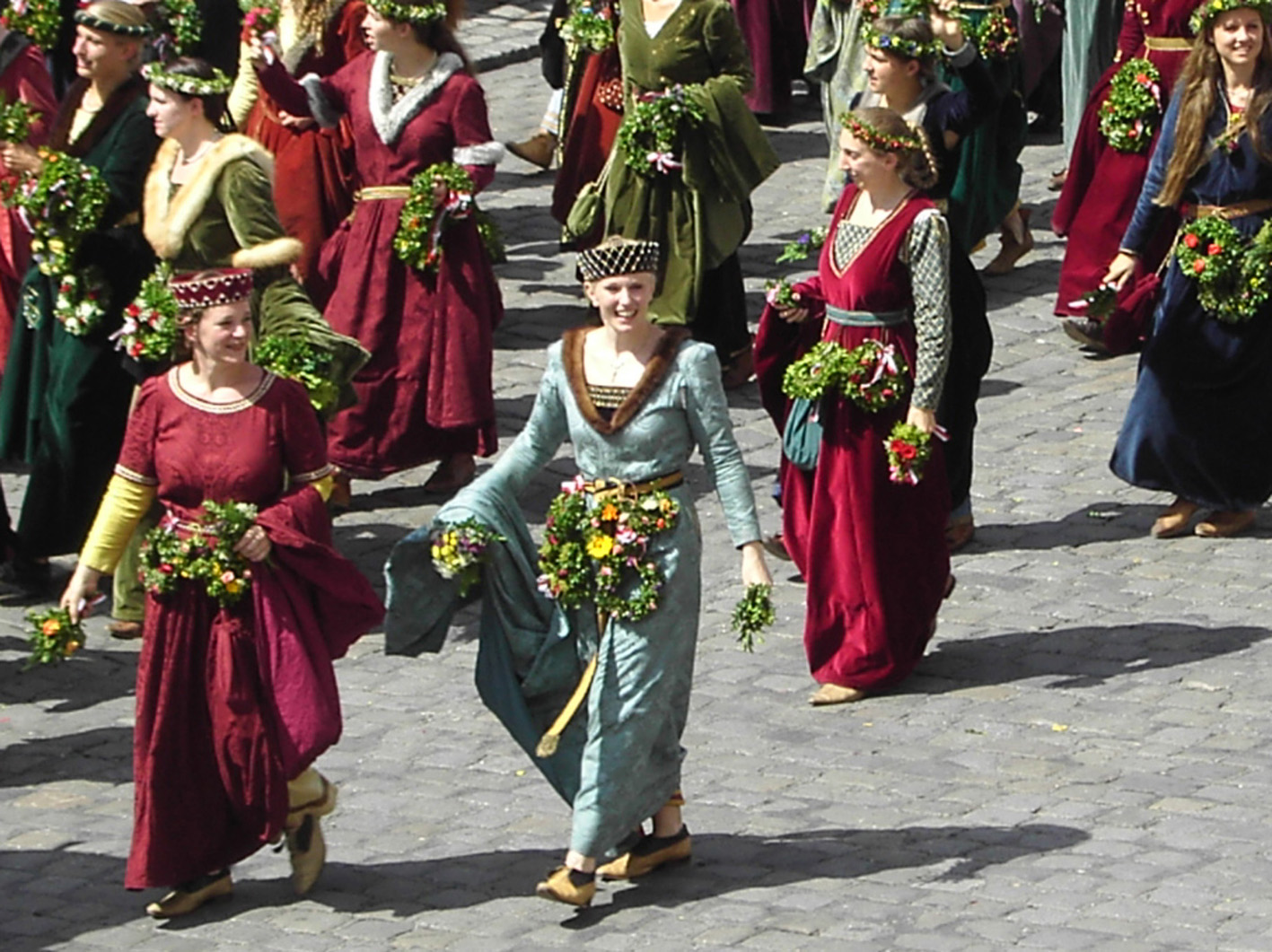
Part of the Landshut Wedding of 2005

Time: Wednesday, Thursday, Friday evenings

Place: Residenz (residence)

Musicians and dancers of Landshut are invited to an atmospheric evening in the courtyard of the Residenz. They depict the history of Mr. Asinus, a farmer who became a nobleman.

=== Tavern in the narrow of Stecken ===
Time: Thursday and Friday evenings

Place: Salzstadel

The proprietor of the tavern offers different things to eat and good wine or beer. Comedians, called "Joculatores", celebrate an evening full of voluptuousness to put some life into the party.

=== Meeting in the old part of town ===
Time: Saturday evening and Sunday morning

Place: Old Town ("Altstadt")

At this weekend some groups liven up the old part of town with music and dancing as in former times. Comedians try to support the atmosphere with their coarse jokes.

== Gallery ==
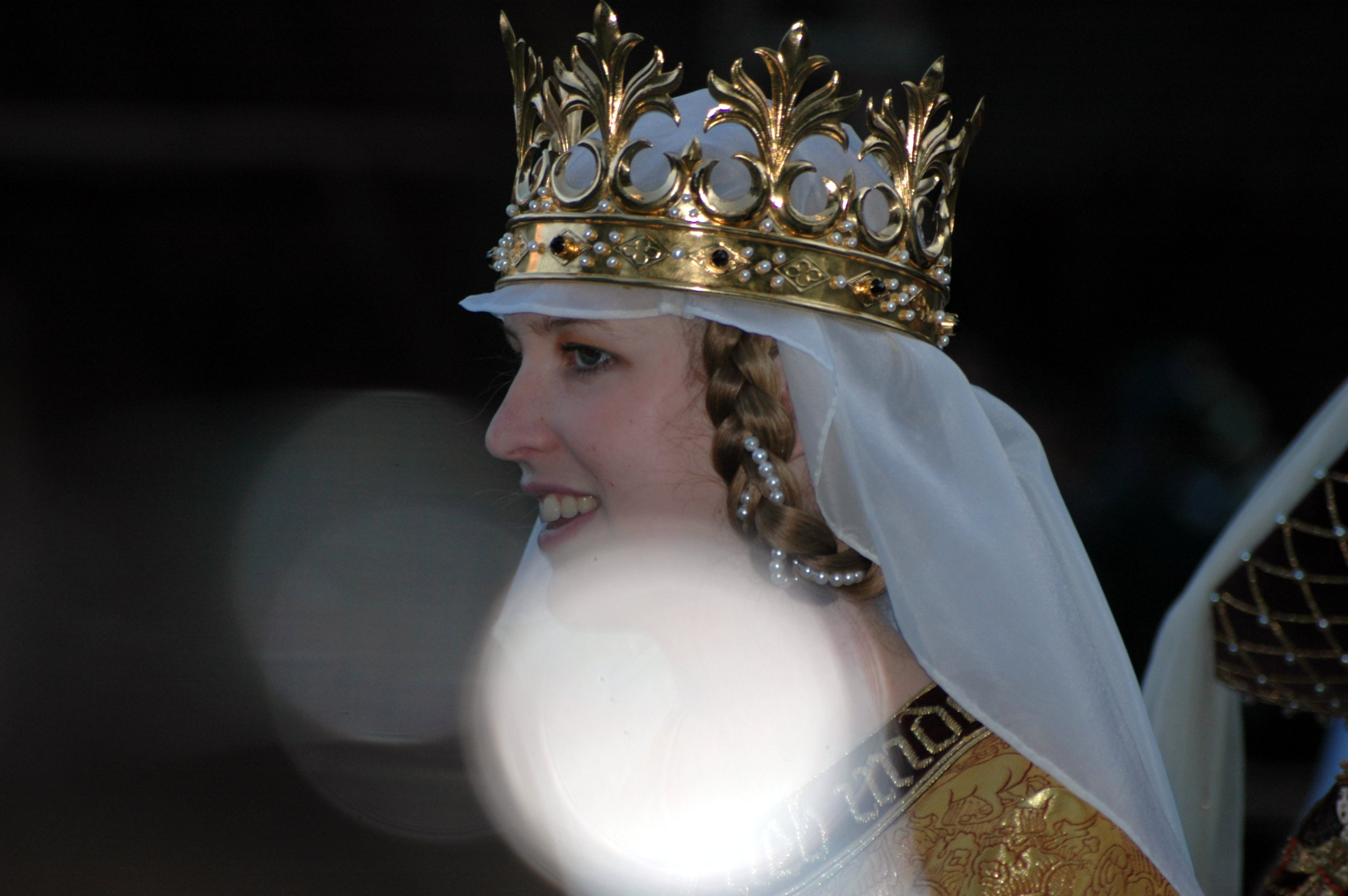

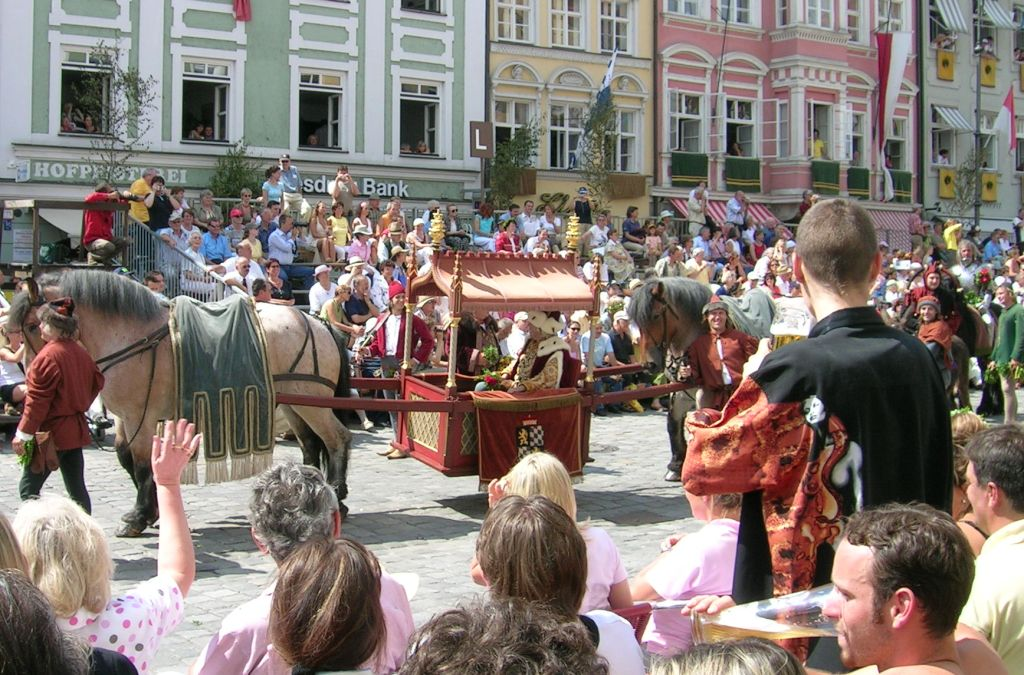

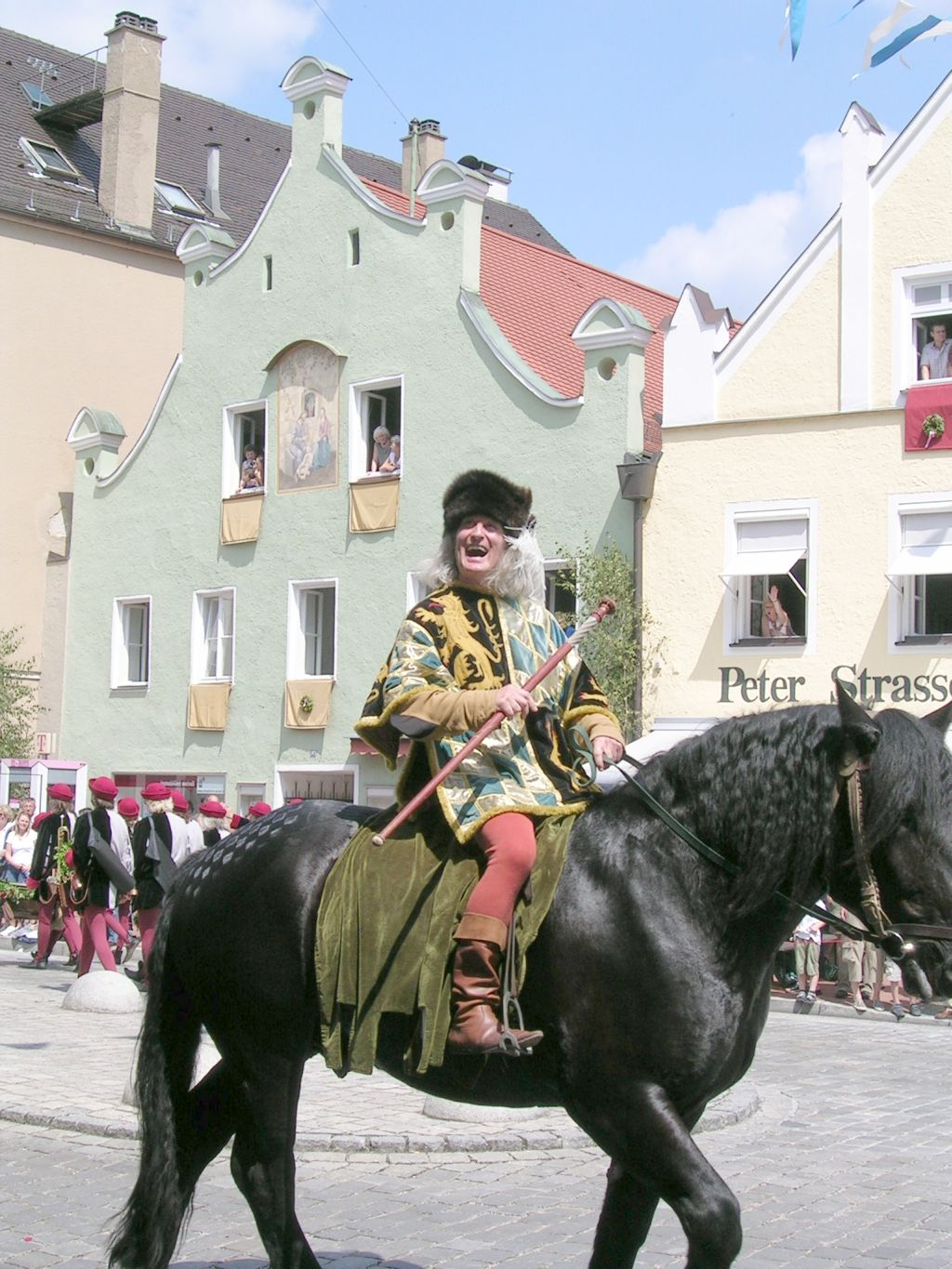

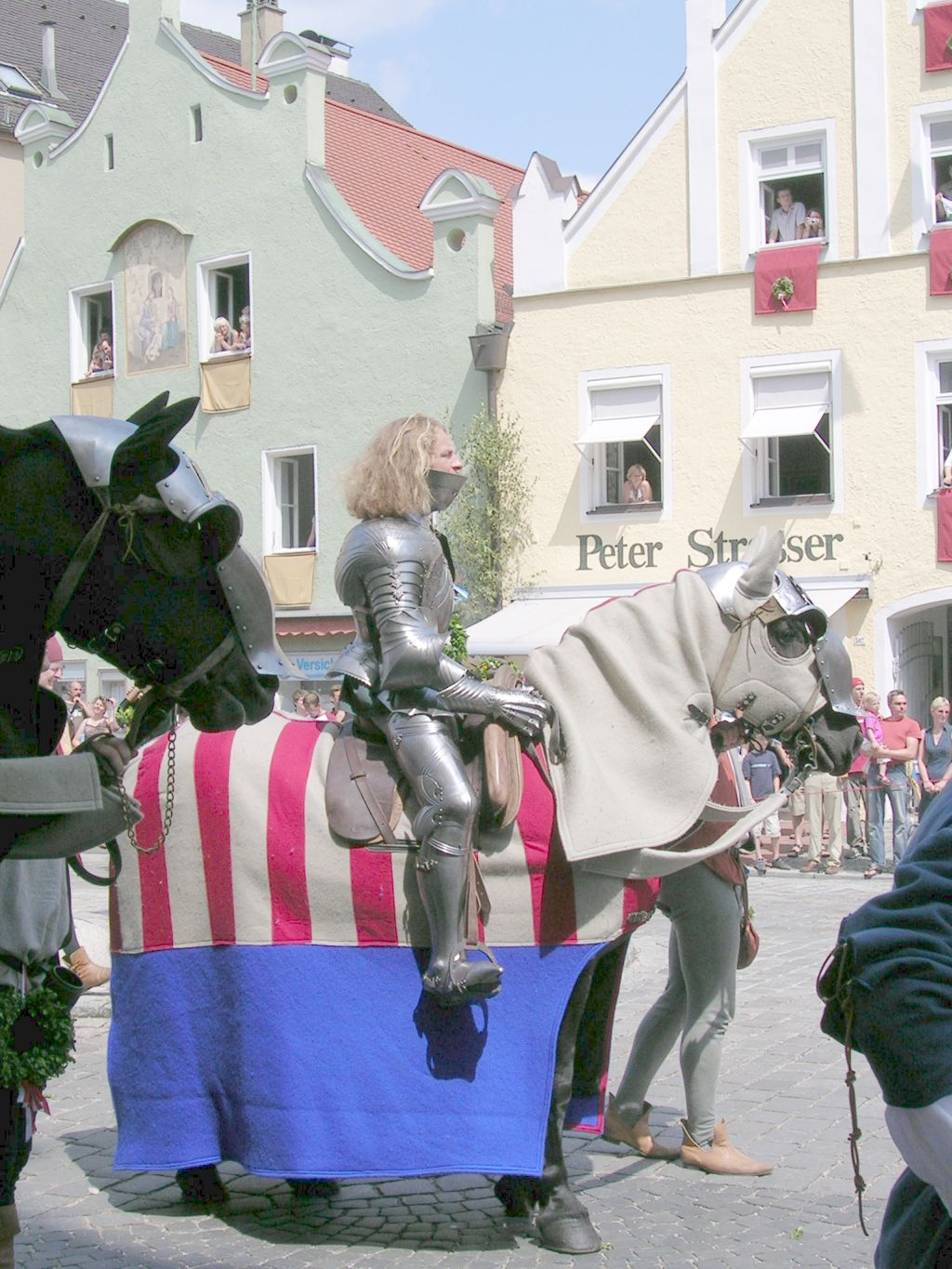

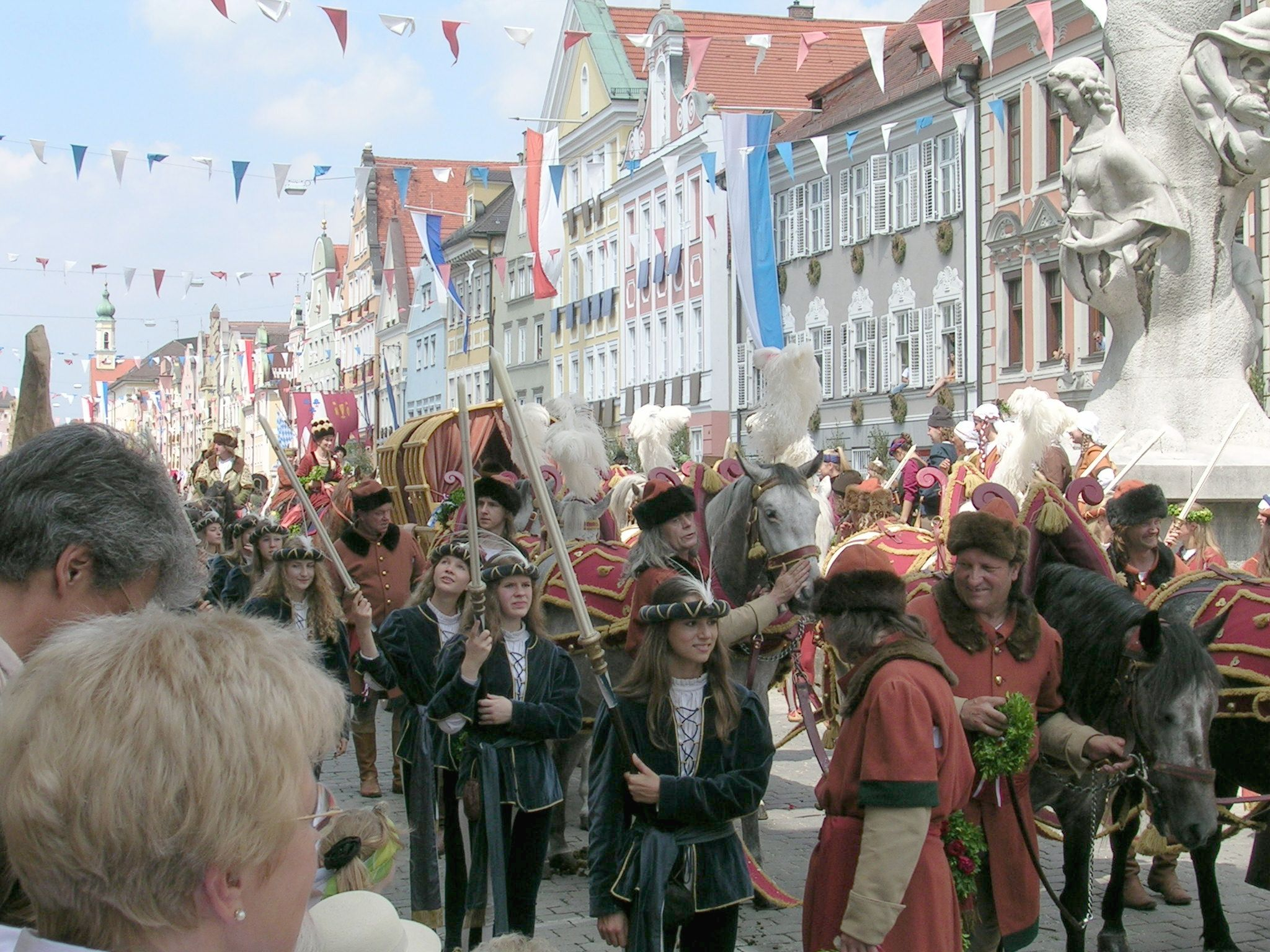

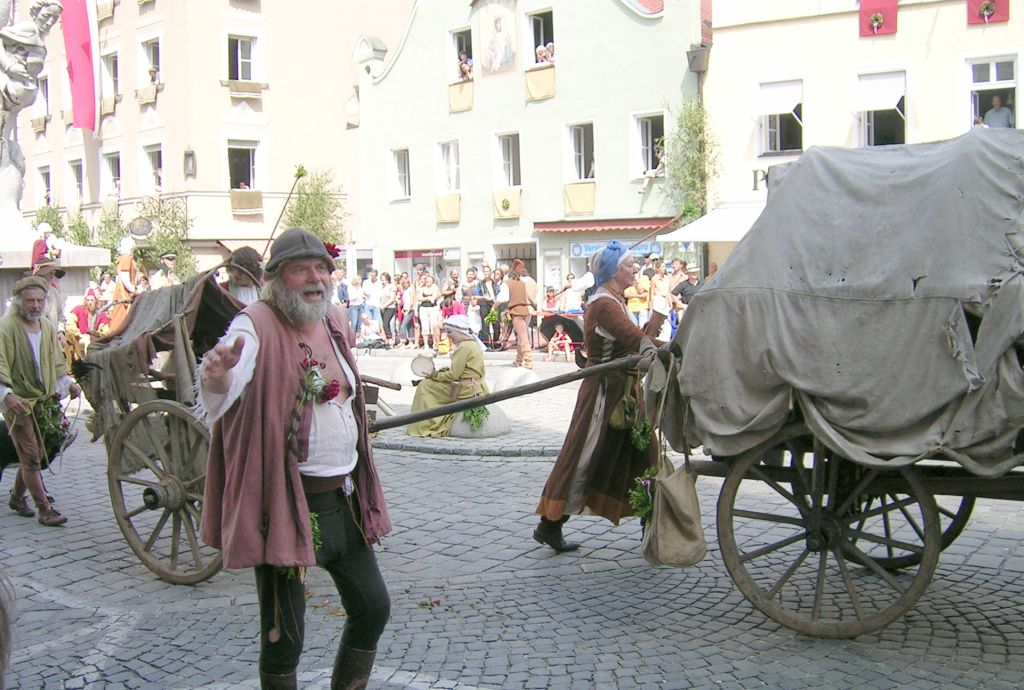

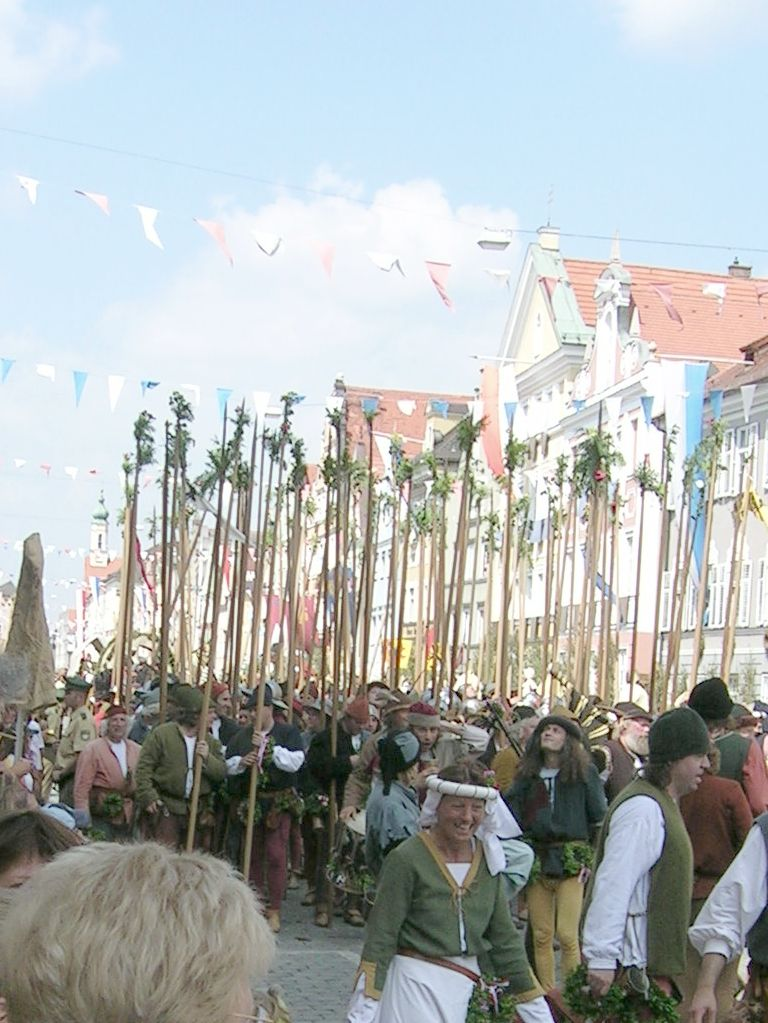

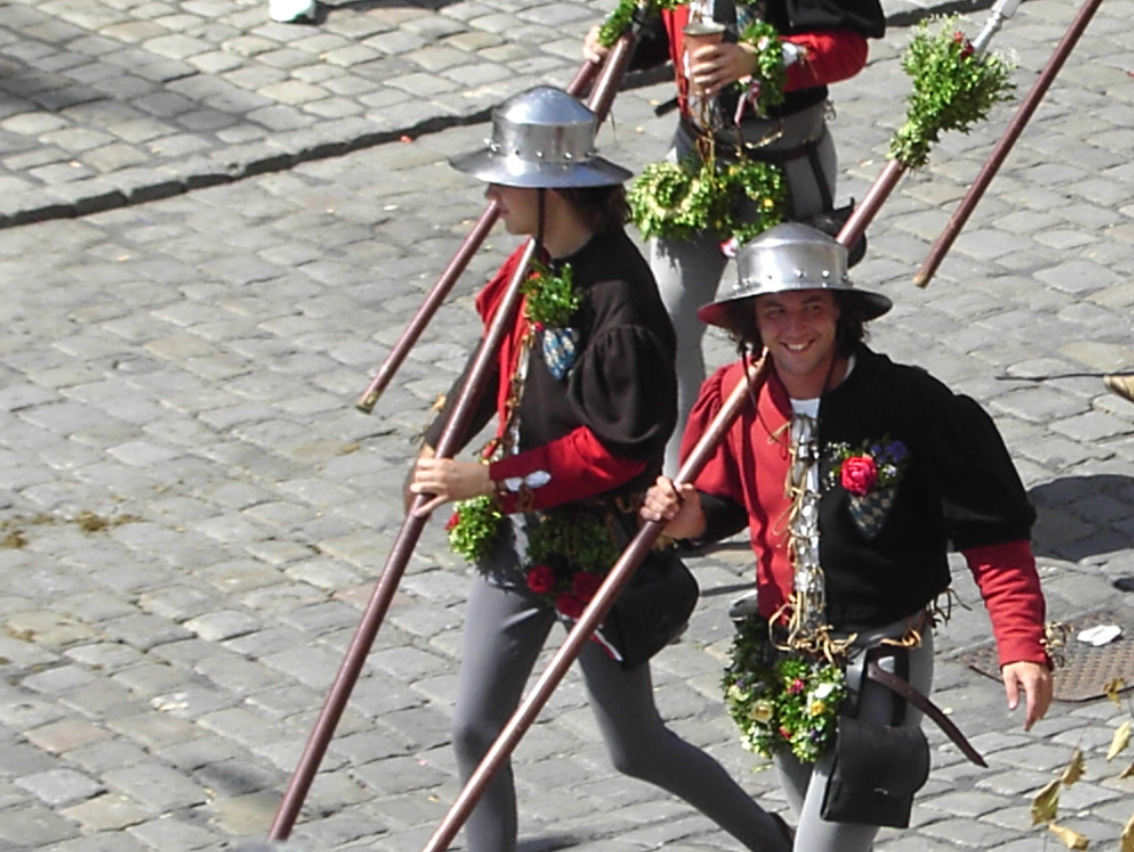

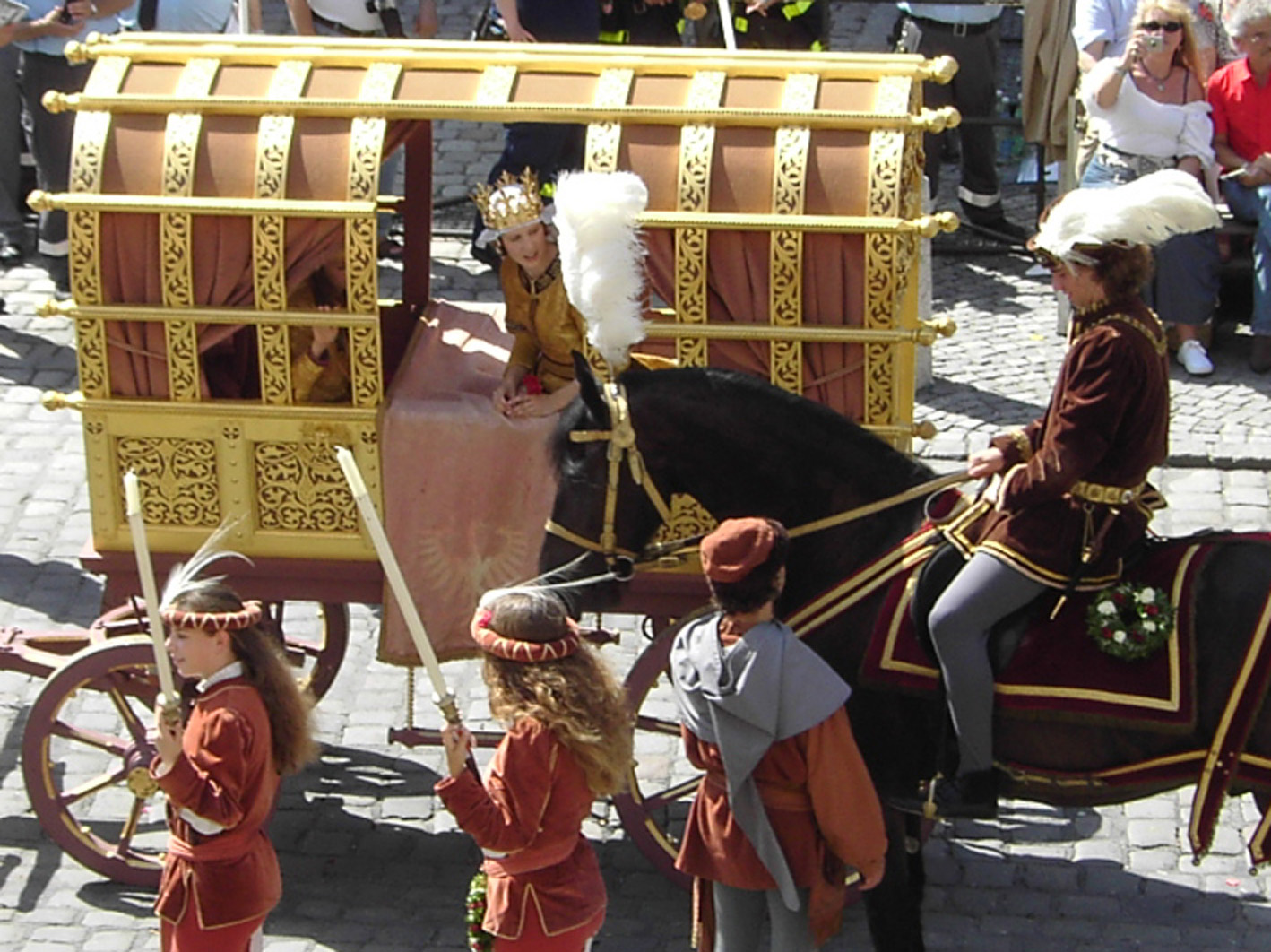
