= Wolfgang Stechow =

American art historian

- Born: Wolfgang Ferdinand Ernst Günther Stechow; June 5, 1896; Kiel
- Died: October 12, 1974 (aged 78)
- Education: University of Göttingen; Kaiser Friedrich Museum
- Known for: Art history

Wolfgang Ferdinand Ernst Günther Stechow (5 June 1896 Kiel – 12 October 1974 Princeton, New Jersey) was a German American art historian.

== Life ==
He was the son of Prussian prosecutor Waldemar Stechow and the concert singer Bertha Deutschmann. He attended the Gymnasium in Göttingen until 1913 and then volunteered in 1914. He was captured in Russia, in 1915 and spent two years in a Siberian camp.

He earned a Ph.D. in 1921, from the University of Göttingen. He was an assistant in the Kaiser Friedrich Museum, under Wilhelm von Bode, from 1921 to 1922. In The Hague, he was assistant to Cornelis Hofstede de Groot, from 1922 to 1924. He then moved in 1923 to the Art History Department, University of Göttingen. There he became a lecturer in 1926, after his postdoctoral appointment of Dutch art, from 1931 to associate professor. During these years he worked from 1927 to 1928 as a member of the German Institute for Art History in Florence . In Rome, he was a visiting lecturer in 1931 at the Bibliotheca Hertziana .

After the takeover of the Nazi regime, he was forced to retire in 1936 as a citizen of evangelical faith with Jewish ancestors. He emigrated to the United States, where he through the mediation of Oskar Hagen, an assistant at the University of Wisconsin in Madison. In 1940, he went to Oberlin College, where he remained until his retirement in 1963. He became a U.S. citizen in 1942.

He was Visiting Professor at the University of Michigan from 1963 to 1964, Robert Sterling Clark Professor of Art at Williams College from 1966 to 1967, William Allan Neilson Chair of Research at Smith College in 1969, Mary Conover Mellon Professor at Vassar College from 1969-1970, Visiting Professor at Yale University from 1971-1972, Distinguished Visiting Professor at Oberlin College in 1972, and Honorary Curator at the Allen Memorial Art Museum in 1973. During the summer semester, he also taught at New York University and Middlebury College.

His papers are held at the Archives of American Art.

== Family ==
He married Ursula Hoff (b. 1911) on 16 December 1932; they had three children (Hans Axel, Barbara and Nicola).

== Works ==
- "Apollo and Daphne", in: Studies of the Warburg Library Volume 23, Leipzig, 1932
- "Rembrandt's depictions of the Emmaus meal", in: Journal of Art History, Vol 3, No. 6 (1934), pp.. 329-341
- Salomon van Ruysdael: an introduction to his art: a critical catalog of the paintings, Berlin 1938
- "Shooting at Father's Corpse", in The Art Bulletin, vol. 24, no. 3, 1942, pp. 213–225. JSTOR, the first history of the motif of The Dead King and his Three Sons.
- Masters of Art: Bruegel, in: (Masters of Art Series)
- Pieter Bruegel the Elder, H. N. Abrams, 1969; Thames and Hudson, 1990, ISBN 978-0-500-08042-9
- Dutch Landscape Painting of the seventeenth Century, London 1966; F. A. Praeger, New York, 1968
- Rubens and the classical tradition, Harvard University Press, 1968
- European Paintings Before 1500, Cleveland Museum of Art Catalogue of Paintings, 1974 ISBN 0-910386-19-6
- Northern Renaissance Art, 1400-1600. Prentice-Hall. 1966. ISBN 9780810108493.; Northwestern University Press, 1989, ISBN 978-0-8101-0849-3
- Dürer in America: His Graphic Work, New York 1971
