= Brazilian imperial family =

Branch of the House of Braganza that ruled the Empire of Brazil

Brazilian imperial family Família imperial brasileira
- Parent house: House of Aviz by the way of the House of Braganza
- Country: Brazil
- Founded: 1822
- Founder: Pedro I
- Current head: Vassouras branch: Prince Bertrand of Orléans-Braganza; Petrópolis branch: Pedro Carlos Orléans-Braganza
- Final ruler: Pedro II
- Titles: Emperor of Brazil; Prince Imperial of Brazil; Prince of Grão-Pará; Prince of Brazil
- Estate: Brazil
- Dissolution: 14 November 1921 (in agnatic line after death of Isabel)
- Deposition: 1889
- Cadet branches: House of Orléans-Braganza; House of Saxe-Coburg and Braganza

The Imperial House of Brazil (Brazilian Portuguese: Casa Imperial Brasileira) is a Brazilian dynasty of Portuguese origin and a cadet branch of the House of Braganza. It reigned over the Brazilian Empire from 1822 to 1889, beginning with the proclamation of Brazilian independence by Dom Pedro of Braganza, then Prince Royal of Portugal, and ending with the deposition of Emperor Pedro II during the military coup that established the First Brazilian Republic.

Members of the Imperial House are dynastic descendants of Emperor Pedro I. After the abolition of the monarchy, leadership of the imperial legacy came to be claimed by descendants of Emperor Pedro II, giving rise to two competing lines within the House of Orléans-Braganza: the Direct Line called Petrópolis branch and a Cadet Line called Vassouras branch. The Petrópolis line is headed by Prince Dom Pedro Carlos of Orléans-Braganza (born 1945) and the only descendants residing in the Imperial Palace of Grão-Pará in the Imperial City of Petrópolis, while the Vassouras branch is led by his second cousin, Bertrand of Orléans-Braganza.

The rivalry between the two branches dates to 1946, when Dom Prince Pedro Gastão of Orléans-Braganza repudiated the statement of not making usage of his dynastic rights made by his father, Pedro de Alcântara, Prince of Grão-Pará, following the latter’s marriage in 1908. Since then, both lines have maintained competing claims to the symbolic headship of the former Brazilian imperial family.

== History ==
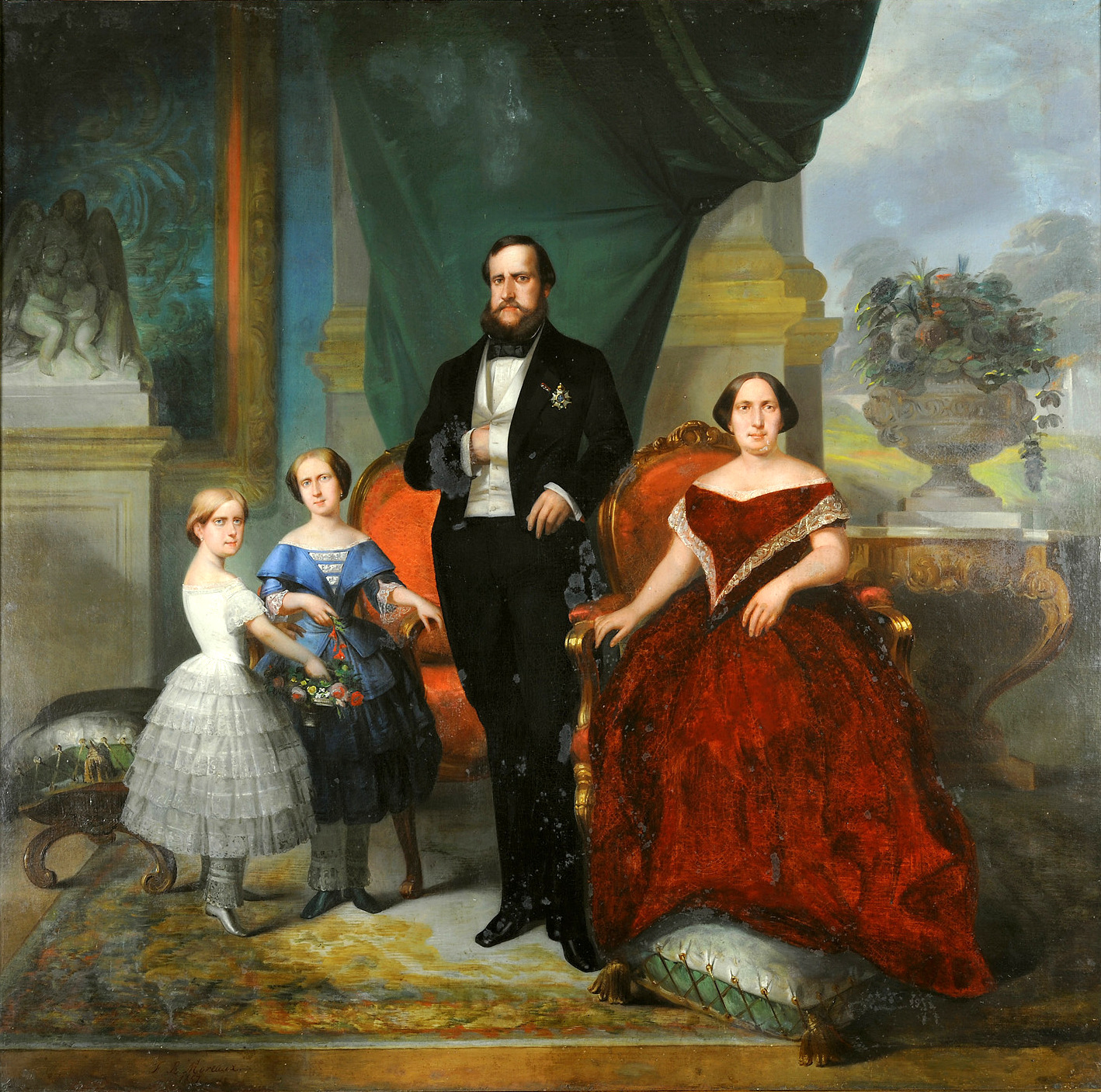
Pedro II, Emperor of Brazil, with his wife Teresa Cristina, and their daughters Isabel (in blue gown) and Leopoldina, 1857

Founded by Pedro of Braganza, until then Prince Royal of the United Kingdom of Portugal, Brazil and the Algarves, member of the House of Braganza, heir apparent to the Portuguese throne and the King's representative in the Kingdom of Brazil as Prince Regent, the Imperial House of Brazil was sovereign from 7 September 1822, when Prince Pedro proclaimed the independence of the Kingdom of Brazil from the United Kingdom of Portugal, Brazil and the Algarves and was subsequently acclaimed as Emperor of Brazil on 12 October that same year until 15 November 1889, when a military coup d'état took place and the proclamation of the Brazilian republic overthrew the monarchy.

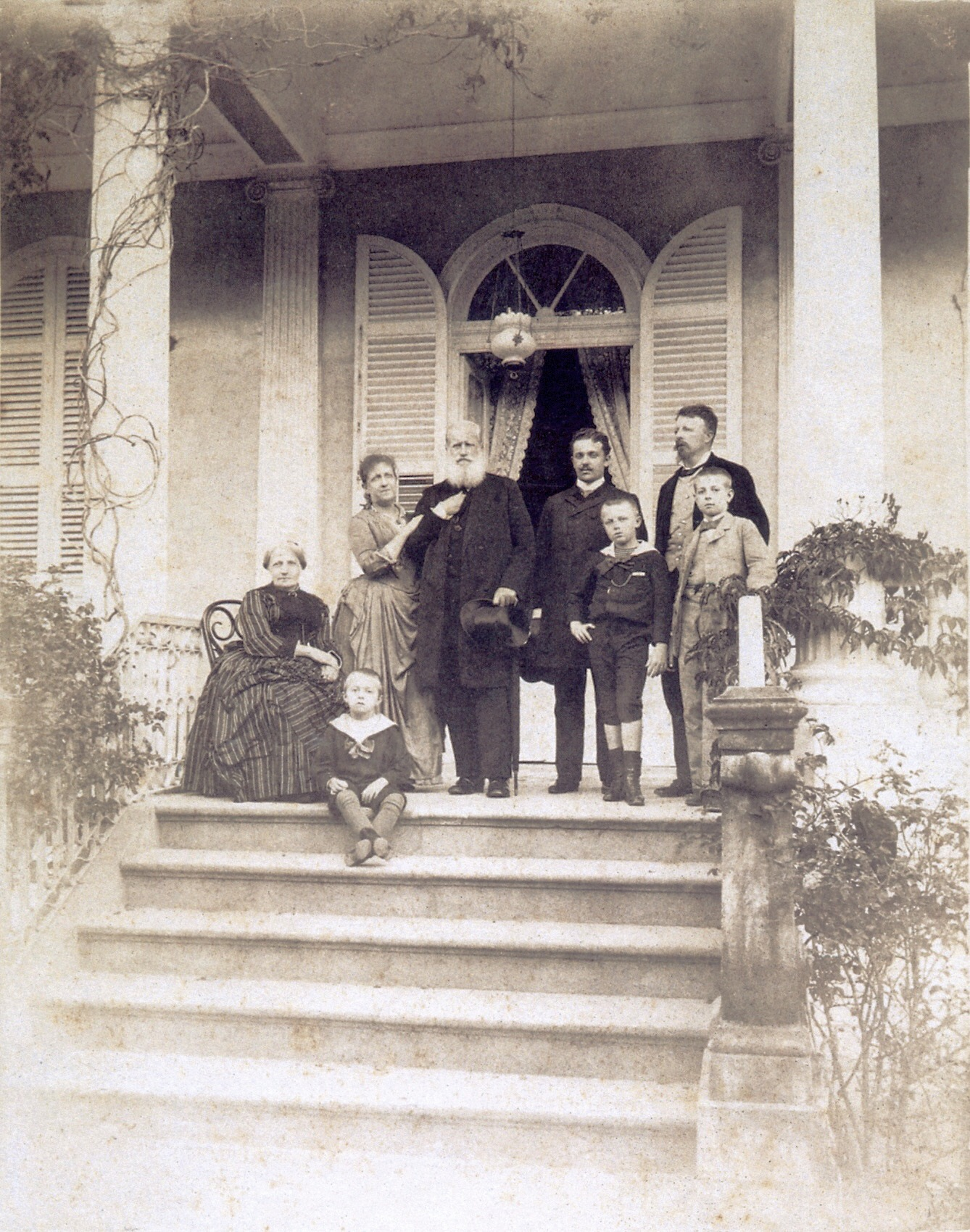
The last picture of the reigning imperial family in Brazil, 1889

Prince Pedro, then, was acclaimed as Emperor of Brazil throughout the land. The constitution of the Brazilian Empire of 1824 – the first Brazilian constitutional charter – was organized two years after independence, with the emperor being the head of state and head of government of the Empire of Brazil, as well as head of the moderator power and the executive power. He reigned until 7 April 1831 when he abdicated due to a long ideological conflict between with a sizable parliamentary faction over the role of the monarch in the government and other obstacles. Pedro I's successor in Brazil was his five-year-old son, Pedro II. As the latter was still a minor, a weak regency was created. The power vacuum resulting from the absence of a ruling monarch as the ultimate arbiter in political disputes led to regional civil wars between local factions. Having inherited an empire on the verge of disintegration, Pedro II, once he was declared of age, managed to bring peace and stability to the country, which eventually became an emerging international power. Even though the last four decades of Pedro II's reign were marked by continuous internal peace and economic prosperity, he had no expectation to see the monarchy survive beyond his lifetime and made no effort to maintain support for the institution. The next in line to the throne was his daughter Isabel, but neither Pedro II nor the ruling classes considered a female monarch acceptable. Lacking any viable heir, the Empire's political leaders saw no reason to defend the monarchy. After a 58-year reign, on 15 November 1889 the Emperor was overthrown in a sudden coup d'état led by a clique of military leaders whose goal was the formation of a republic headed by a dictator, forming the First Brazilian Republic.

=== Post monarchy ===
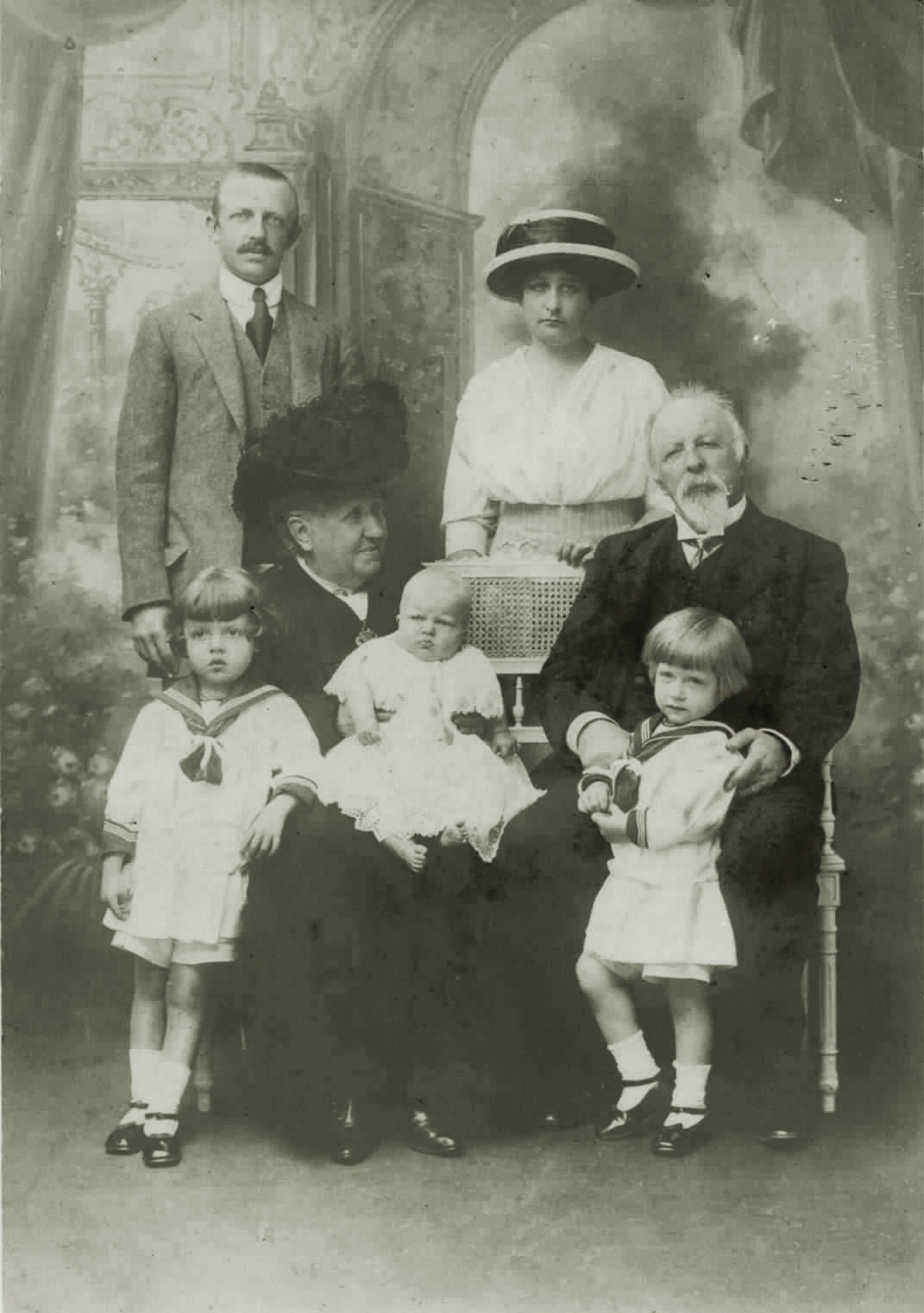
Princess Isabel, then-Head of the Imperial House of Brazil, her husband the Count of Eu, their son Prince Luís, his wife Princess Maria di Grazia, and their children Pedro Henrique, Luiz Gastão, and Pia Maria (on Isabel's lap), 1913

With the proclamation of the Brazilian republic on 15 November 1889, the imperial family went into exile in Portugal, Spain, France and Austria-Hungary. In the party that accompanied the imperial family were included many loyal subjects and nobles, as politicians such the Viscount of Ouro Preto, the deposed last Prime Minister of the Empire, as well the Emperor's particular doctor. Prince August Leopold of Saxe-Coburg and Gotha, grandson of Emperor Pedro II was the only member of the imperial family not boarded to exile because he was on board the cruiser Almirante Barroso, on a circumnavigation trip. Subsequently, upon receiving the news of the deposition of the monarchy, he was sent into exile. In addition to the ban, the Republican government confiscated and auctioned many of the assets of the imperial family. In 1890, thirteen auctions of Imperial House goods were made. Empress Teresa Cristina died in the first months of exile. Later Emperor Pedro II died in France, where he received a head of state's funeral by the French government. The imperial family settled in the Château d'Eu, former residence of King Louis Philippe of France and property of Gaston of Orléans, Count d'Eu, husband of Isabel, Princess Imperial of Brazil, heiress of Pedro II and de jure Empress-in-Exile of Brazil.

Despite the prohibition then in force, Prince Luiz of Orléans-Braganza tried to disembark in Rio de Janeiro in 1906, but was prevented by local authorities. Finally, President Epitácio Pessoa, by presidential decree of 3 September 1920, revoked the Banishment Law. The Imperial Family was then able to return to Brazilian soil. The occasion was used to repatriate the remains of the last emperor and his consort, who would be transferred from Portugal a year later. Of the nine members of the imperial family originally exiled, only two returned to Brazil alive: Pedro de Alcântara, Prince of Grão-Pará and his father, Prince Gaston, Count of Eu, who died the following year aboard the ship Massilia, on their way to Brazil to celebrate the centenary of independence. The State gave back possessions of the Imperial Family to the Petrópolis Branch exclusively, to Prince Dom Pedro de Alcântara, within those possessions was the Palácio do Grão-Pará in Petropolis, where the Direct Line of Descendants of the last Emperor, the Petrópolis Branch still resides until today. On the other hand, not all the family returned immediately to Brazil, and the Vassouras branch, present clamoring to the Brazilian throne, did only return after the end of World War II.

=== Repatriation ===
Currently, the remains of five members of the imperial family are interred in the Imperial Mausoleum within the Cathedral of Saint Peter of Alcantara in Petrópolis: Emperor Pedro II and Empress Teresa Cristina, whose mortal remains were transferred from the Royal Pantheon of the House of Braganza in Lisbon in 1921, during the centenary of Brazil's independence; Princess Isabel and her husband, Prince Gaston, Count of Eu, who were moved from the cemetery of Eu, Seine-Maritime in 1953; and Pedro de Alcântara, Prince of Grão-Pará, who was transferred from the cemetery of Petrópolis in 1990 alongside his wife, Countess Elisabeth Dobrzensky of Dobrzenicz. Prince Luiz and Prince Antônio are interred in the Royal Chapel of Dreux, France, where Prince Luiz's wife, Princess Maria di Grazia of Bourbon-Two Sicilies, was also interred in 1973. Princes Pedro Augusto, August Leopold, Joseph Ferdinand, and Ludwig Gaston are interred in the crypt of the St. Augustine's Church in Coburg, Germany, where their mother, Princess Leopoldina, was interred in 1871.

In 1954, the remains of the first empress, Maria Leopoldina, were transferred from the Convent of Saint Anthony in Rio de Janeiro to the Imperial Crypt and Chapel within the Monument to the Independence of Brazil in São Paulo. Several children of both emperors are interred at the Convent of Saint Anthony: Prince Miguel, Prince João Carlos, Princess Paula, Prince Afonso and Prince Pedro Afonso, and Princess Luísa Vitória. In 1972, to mark the sesquicentennial of independence, the remains of Emperor Pedro I were transferred from the Pantheon of the House of Braganza to the Imperial Crypt and Chapel in São Paulo. The body of his second wife, Empress Amélie, was transferred there from the Braganza Pantheon in 1982. That same year, the body of their daughter, Princess Maria Amélia, was transferred from the Braganza Pantheon to the Convent of Saint Anthony.

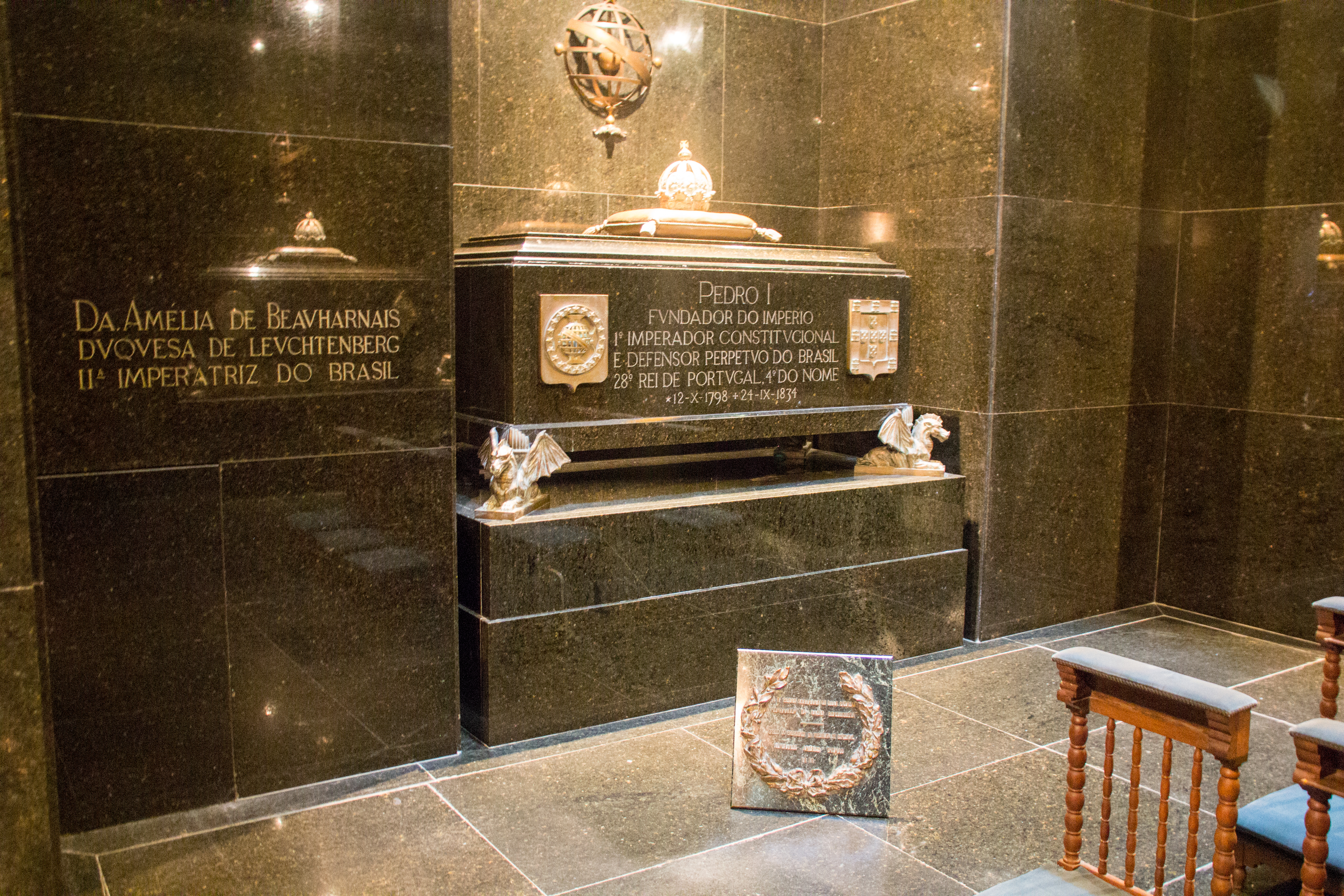
The Imperial Crypt and Chapel in the Monument to the Independence of Brazil in São Paulo, serves as the burial place of Emperor Pedro I (also King Pedro IV of Portugal) and his two wives

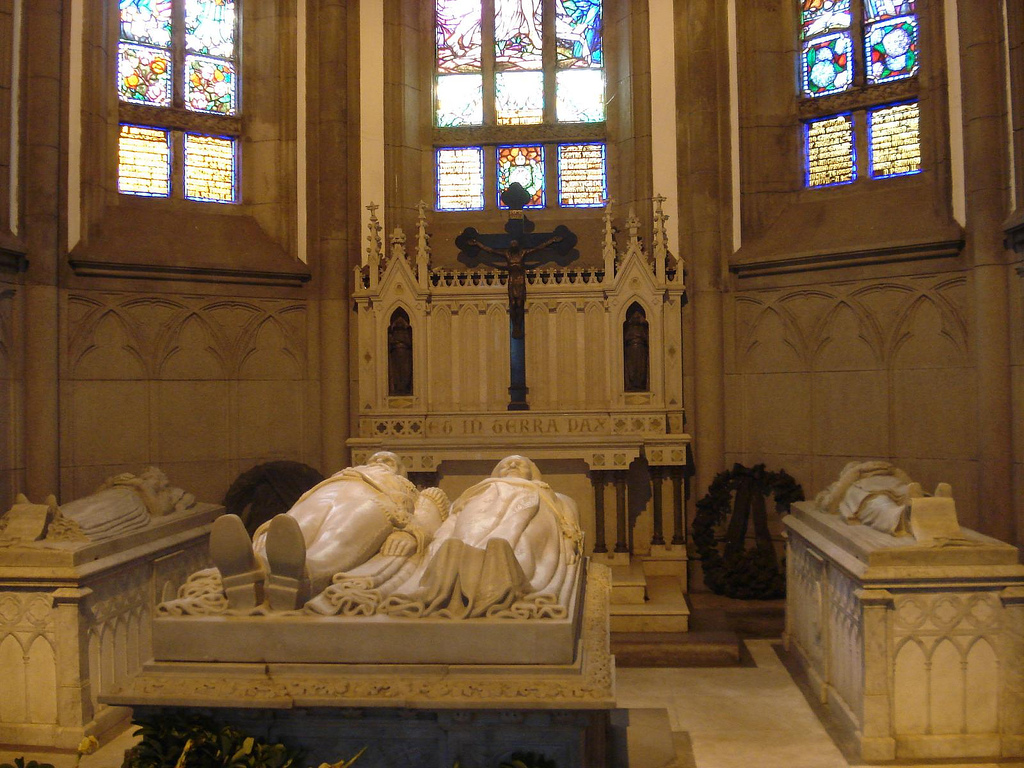
The tombs of Emperor Pedro II and other members of the imperial family in the Imperial Mausoleum, housed within the Cathedral of Petrópolis

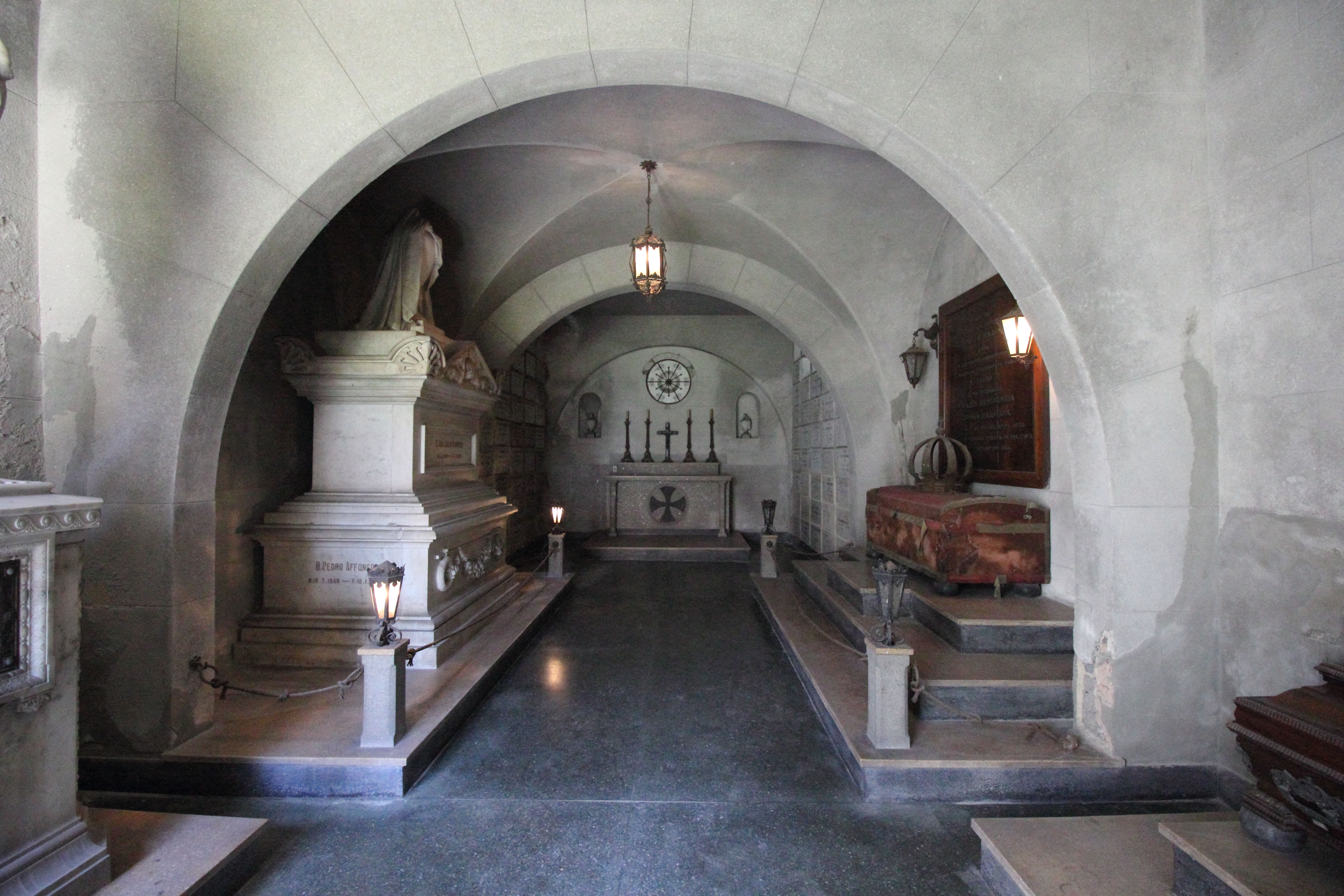
A mausoleum at the Convent of Saint Anthony in Rio de Janeiro, where several princes and princesses of the Empire of Brazil are interred.

== Dynastic question ==
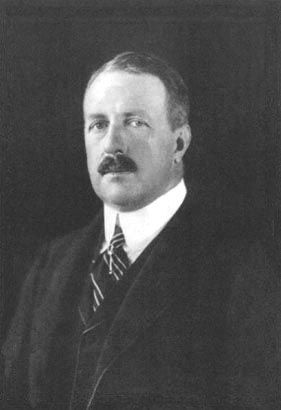
Pedro de Alcântara, Prince of Grão-Pará made a statement of not making use of his rights to the Brazilian throne in favor of the "people following behind him" (including his own children).

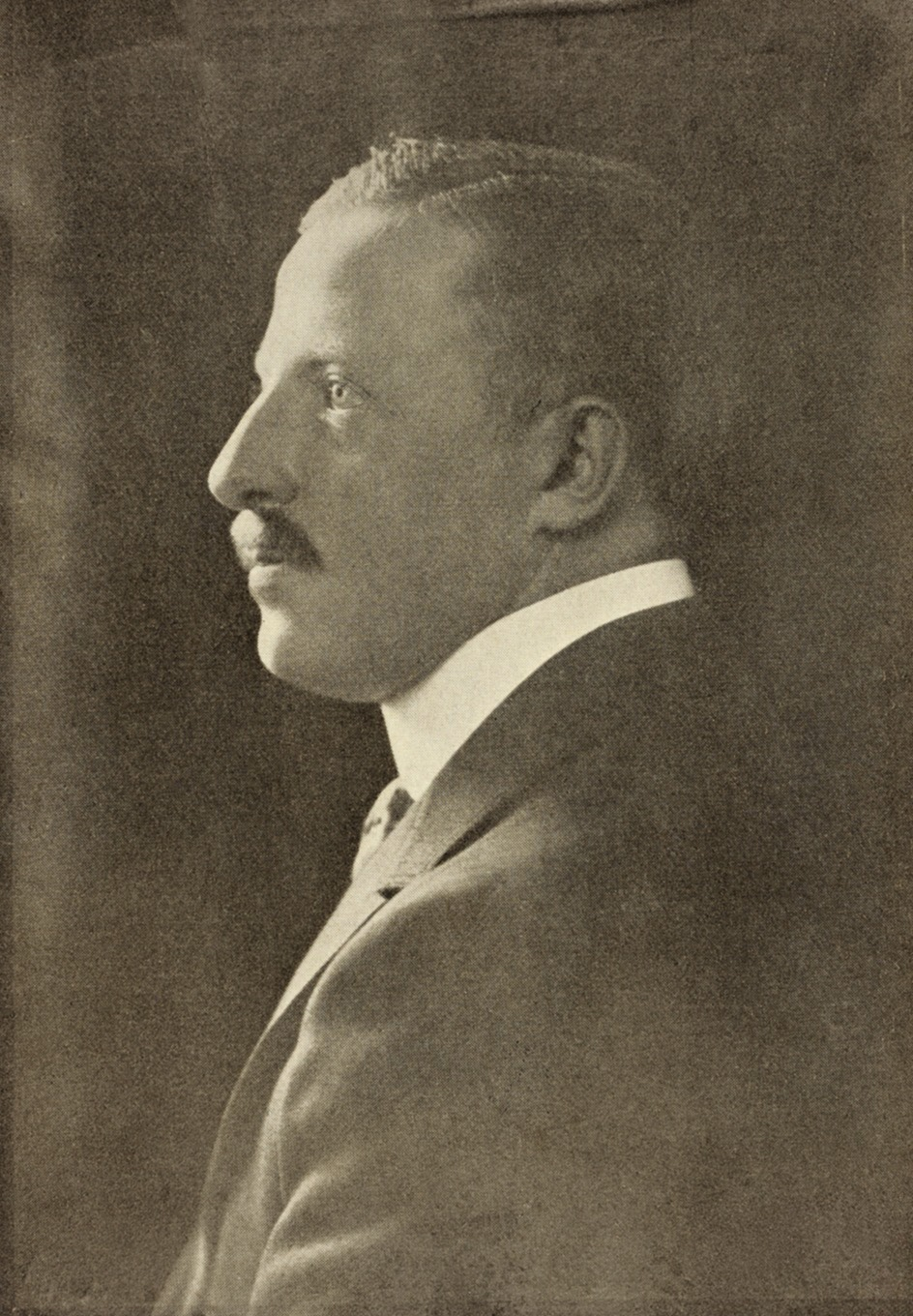
Prince Luís of Orléans-Braganza claimed the title of Prince Imperial of Brazil, arguing that his older brother's renunciation was valid.

The so-called Brazilian dynastic question concerns inheritance rights to the titles of Head of the Brazilian Imperial House, Prince Imperial of Brazil, Prince of Grão-Pará and Prince of Brazil, who consequently would indicate the preferred heirs to the Brazilian imperial throne. The primacy in the line of succession is disputed by some members and partisans of the dynastic branches of Petrópolis and Vassouras.

In 1908, Dom Pedro de Alcântara, then Prince Imperial of Brazil in exile, wanted to marry Countess Elisabeth Dobržensky de Dobrženicz (1875–1951), whose family had belonged to the nobility of the kingdom of Bohemia since 1339, and whose legitimate members, male and female, bore the title of baron since 1744 and of count or countess since issuance of Austrian letters patent on 21 February 1906. The countess did not, however, belong to a reigning or formerly reigning dynasty, as both Orléans and Braganza traditions expected of brides. Although the constitution of the Brazilian Empire did not require dynasts to marry equally, it made the marriage of the heir to the throne dependent upon the sovereign's consent. As Prince Dom Pedro wanted to marry with his mother's blessing, he made a statement to not make usage of his rights to the throne of Brazil at Cannes on 30 October 1908. The statement, unsigned, was sent to the Brazilian Monarchical Directory, an official body created to manage monarchical interests in the country. To solemnize this, Dom Pedro, aged thirty-three, wrote the statement translated here:

I, Prince Pedro de Alcântara Luiz Filipe Maria Gastão Miguel Gabriel Rafael Gonzaga of Orleans-Braganza, having maturely reflected, have resolved to renounce the rights that, by the Constitution of the Empire of Brazil, promulgated on 25 March 1824, accord to me the Crown of that nation. I declare, therefore, that by my free and spontaneous will I will respect my decision, for myself, as well as in front of any and all of my descendants, to all and any rights that the aforesaid Constitution confers upon me to the Brazilian Crown and Throne, which shall pass to the lines which follow mine, conforming to the order of succession as established by article 117. Before God I promise, for myself and my descendants, to hold to the present declaration. Cannes 30 October 1908 signed: Pedro de Alcântara of Orleans-Braganza

This renunciation was followed by a letter from Isabel to royalists in Brazil:

9 November 1908, Château d'Eu

Most Excellent Gentlemen Members of the Monarchist Directory,

With all my heart I thank you for the congratulations upon the marriages of my dear children Pedro and Luiz. Luiz's took place in Cannes on the 4th with the brilliance that is desired for so solemn an act in the life of my successor to the Throne of Brazil. I was very pleased. Pedro's shall take place next on the 14th. Before the marriage of Luiz he signed his resignation to the crown of Brazil, and here I send it to you, while keeping here an identical copy. I believe that this news must be published as soon as possible (you gentlemen shall do it in the way that you judge to be most satisfactory) in order to prevent the formation of parties that would be a great evil for our country. Pedro will continue to love his homeland, and will give all possible support to his brother. Thank God they are very united. Luiz will engage actively in everything with respect to the monarchy and any good for our land. However, without giving up my rights I want that he be up to date on everything so that he may prepare himself for the position which with all my heart I desire that one day he will hold. You may write to him as many times as you may want to so that he shall be informed of everything. My strength is not the same as it once was, but my heart is still the same to love my homeland and all those who are so dedicated to us. I give you all my friendship and confidence,

a) Isabel, comtesse d'Eu

If the 1908 renunciation of Pedro de Alcântara was valid, his brother Luiz (and eventually, Pedro Henrique) became next in the line of succession after their mother. Isabel's headship of the Brazilian Imperial House lasted until her death in 1921, when she is widely considered to have been succeeded by her grandson, Prince Pedro Henrique of Orléans-Braganza. Pedro Henrique was the elder son of Prince Luiz, second child of Isabel and a veteran of World War I who had died in 1920 from an illness he contracted in the trenches.

Prince Pedro de Alcântara did not dispute the validity of the renunciation. Though he did not claim the headship of the Imperial House himself, in 1937 he did say in an interview that his renunciation "did not meet the requirements of Brazilian Law, there was no prior consultation with the nation, there was none of the necessary protocol that is required for acts of this nature and, furthermore, it was not a hereditary renunciation."

The dynastic dispute over the Brazilian crown began after 1940 when Prince Pedro Gastão of Orléans-Braganza, eldest son of Pedro de Alcântara repudiated his father's renunciation and claimed the headship of the Brazilian Imperial House.

Pedro Gastão actively campaigned in support of Brazil's 1993 referendum on restoration of the Brazilian monarchy, which would have postponed for subsequent decision by Parliament of which descendant of the former imperial family should occupy the throne if monarchy had been re-instated, but the option of restoration was defeated despite garnering approximately 7 million votes. After the death of Pedro Gastão in 2007, his eldest son Prince Pedro Carlos and younger children declared themselves republicans. Several of Pedro Gastão's grandchildren also have dual citizenship.

== Branches ==
Coat of the House of Orléans-Braganza

Coat of the House of Saxe-Coburg and Braganza

=== House of Orléans-Braganza ===
With the marriage of Isabel of Braganza, Princess Imperial of Brazil, with Prince Gaston of Orléans, Count d'Eu in 1864, the Imperial House associated itself with the House of Orléans, that composes the French royal family. Thus began a new dynastic branch of Brazil: Orléans-Braganza, which never had the opportunity to reign in Brazil.

Of the four children of the couple, two have generated offspring and this branch of the family has more than thirty members. Many are those who renounced for themselves and their descendants any rights in succession to the imperial throne, losing titles and precedence in the imperial family.

In 1909, Prince Gaston engaged in negotiations with Philippe, Duke of Orléans, resulting in a document signed by nearly all the male-line princes descended from France's citizen-king, Louis Philippe, called the Pacte de Famille (or "Declaration of Brussels"): the title of Prince of Orléans-Braganza was created, and the style of Royal Highness recognized, exclusive to male-line descendants of that branch of the family.

=== House of Saxe-Coburg-Braganza ===
The Saxe-Coburg-Braganza branch is descended from Princess Leopoldina of Brazil, second daughter of Dom Pedro II, and her husband, Prince Ludwig August of the House of Saxe-Coburg and Gotha-Koháry. Due to several years of difficulties that the Princess Imperial Isabel experienced in producing an heir to the throne, clauses were included in the marriage contract between Leopoldina and her husband to ensure that the couple should, among other things, reside part of the year in Brazil and have their children on Brazilian territory, as heirs presumptive of Isabel: Pedro Augusto, Augusto Leopoldo, and José Fernando. With the birth of Dom Pedro de Alcântara, Prince of Grão-Pará and eldest son of Princess Isabel, the Saxe-Coburg-Braganza branch yielded first place in the line of succession to the Orleans-Braganza branch.

The only members of the Saxe-Coburg-Braganza branch who still retain Brazilian nationality, which was a constitutional requirement to succeed to the now defunct Brazilian throne, are the descendants of Princess Teresa Cristina of Saxe-Coburg and Gotha, daughter of Augusto Leopoldo. Her Brazilian nationality was recognized by the government of Brazil only in 1922; her four children were registered in the consulate of Brazil in Vienna as Brazilian citizens. Carlos Tasso de Saxe-Coburgo e Bragança, Baron Taxis-Bordogna-Valnigra and son of Princess Teresa Cristina, is the current head of this branch.

== Emperors of Brazil ==
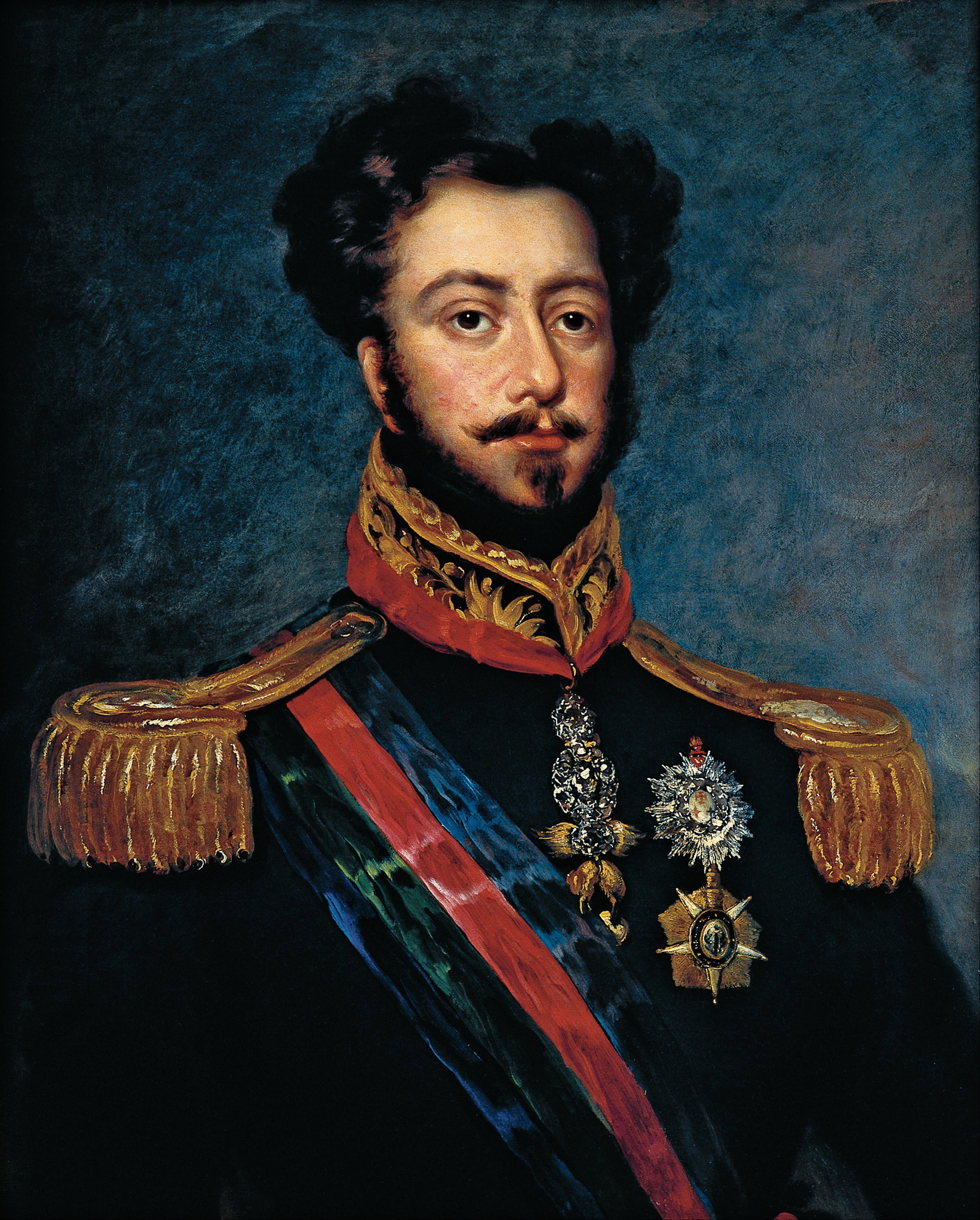
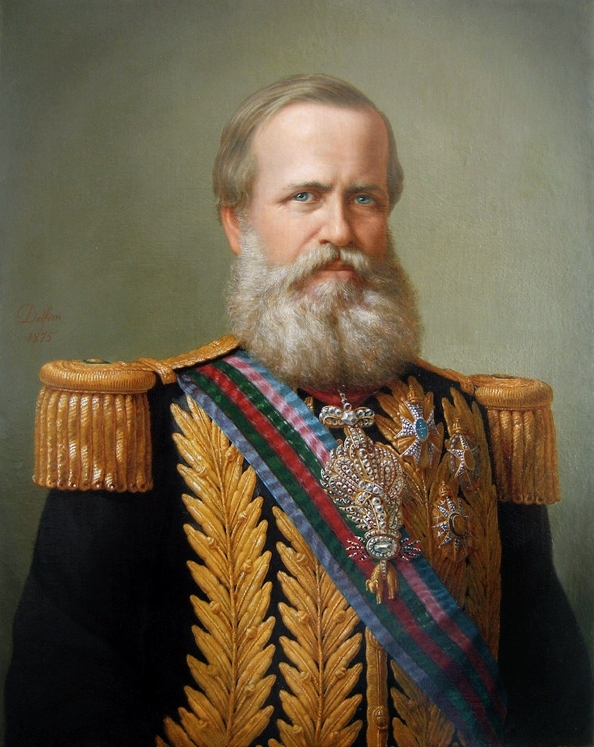
Brazilian emperors Pedro I and Pedro II, respectively

The Empire of Brazil remained a constitutional monarchy until 1889 – when the republic was proclaimed after a military coup d'état, and had two reigning emperors, both from the House of Braganza:

- Dom Pedro I of Brazil (1822–1831): Born in 1798, deceased in 1834. Was also King of Portugal in 1826, as Pedro IV.
- Dom Pedro II of Brazil (Regency 1831–1840; Reigned personally 1840–1889): Born in 1825 and deceased in 1891.

Their full style and title were: "His Imperial Majesty, Constitutional Emperor and Perpetual Defender of Brazil".

Name	Became monarch	Notes
Pedro I of Brazil	1822	Emperor of Brazil; declarer of Brazilian Independence; King of Portugal and the Algarves
Pedro II of Brazil	1831	Emperor of Brazil; last Emperor of Brazil

== Pretenders to the Brazilian throne since 1889 ==
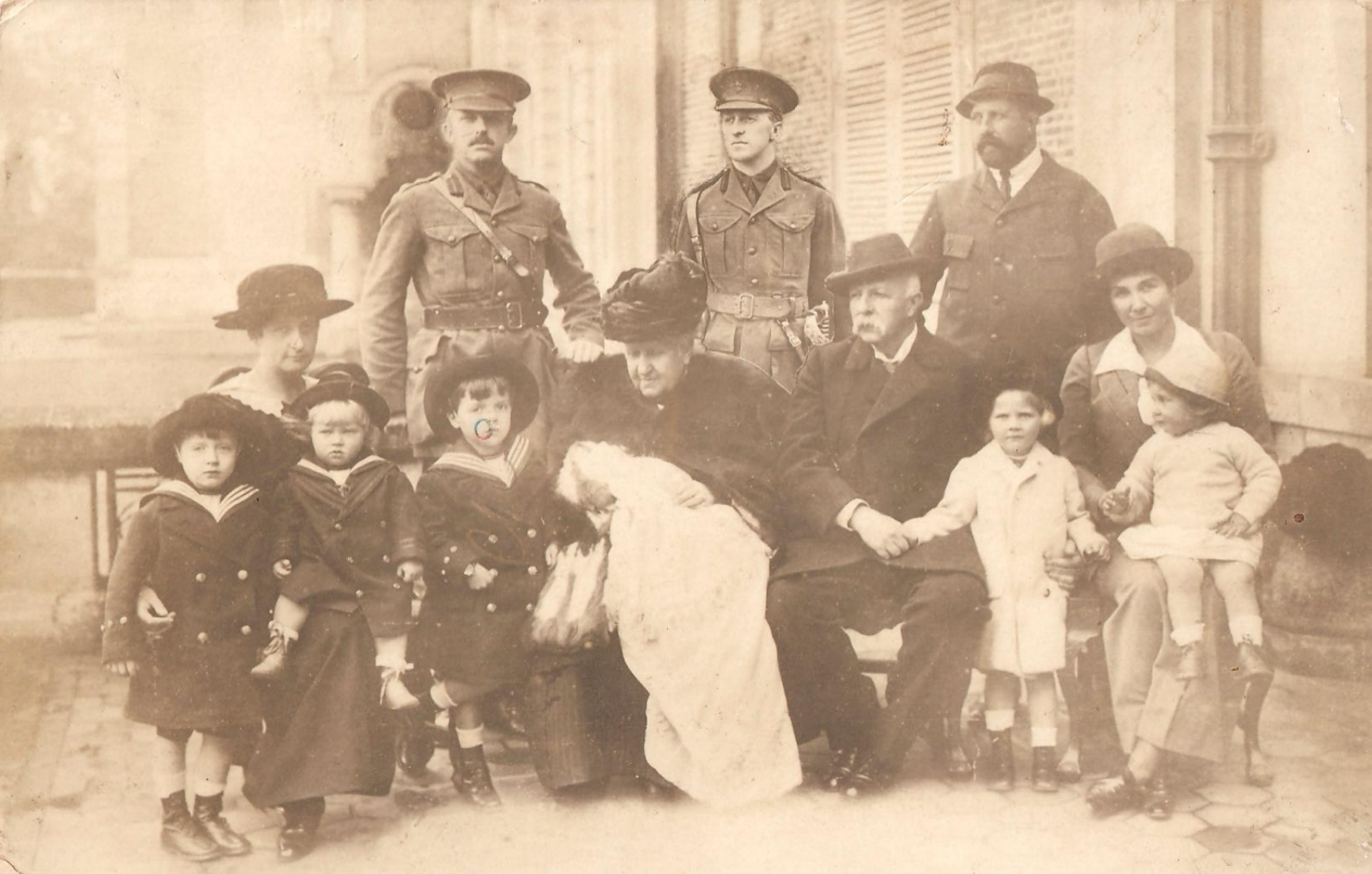
Princess Isabel and Prince Gaston with their family in Normandy, France, during the exile of the imperial family (undated).

- Pedro II of Brazil (1889–1891)
- Isabel of Brazil (1891–1921): Born in 1846, died in 1921. Princess Imperial and regent of Brazil, she was the elder daughter of Pedro II and after his death considered de jure Empress of Brazil

=== Vassouras line ===
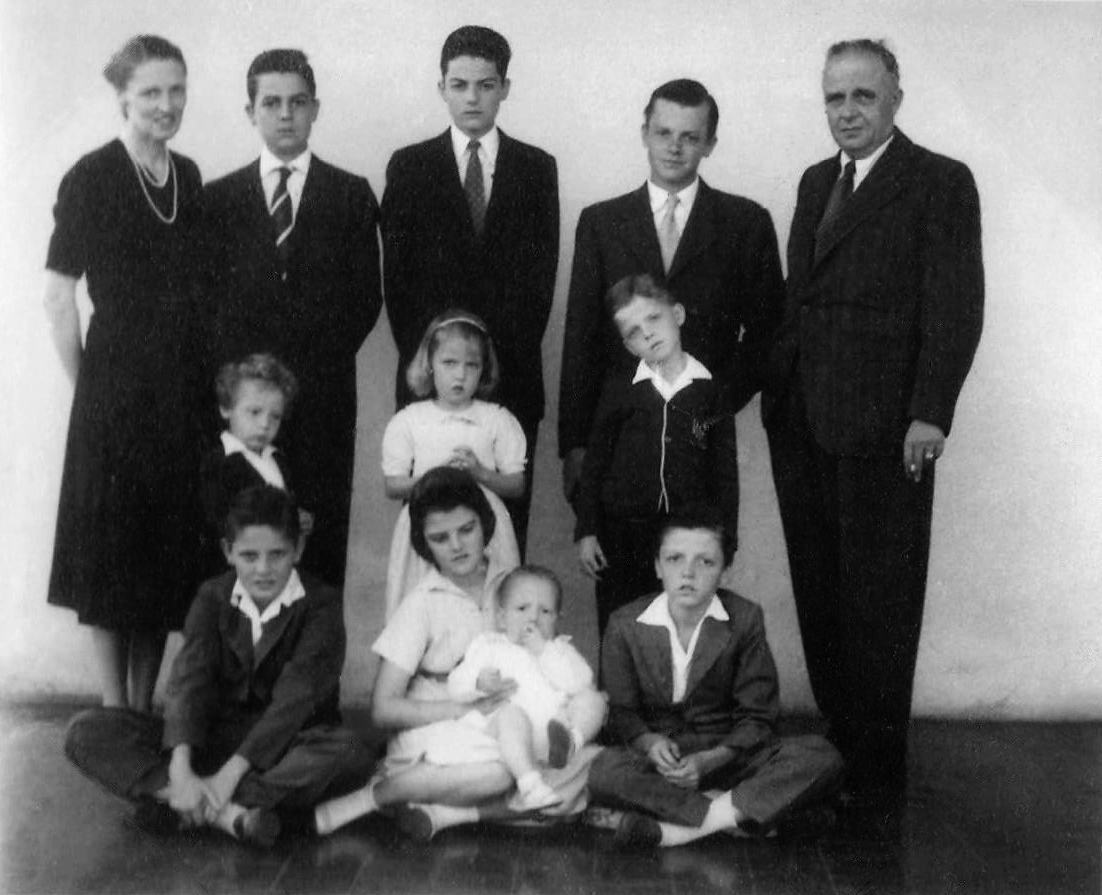
The Vassouras line of the imperial family, 1950s−1960s.

- Pedro Henrique of Orléans-Braganza (1921–1981): Born in 1909, died in 1981. Grandson of Princess Isabel, son and heir of her second son, Prince Luís of Orléans-Braganza (1878–1920).
- Luiz of Orléans-Braganza (1981–2022): Born in 1938, died in 2022, the eldest son of Prince Pedro Henrique.
- Bertrand of Orléans-Braganza (2022–present): born in 1941, third son of Prince Pedro Henrique.
  - Heir: Rafael Antônio of Orléans-Braganza (born in 1986), nephew of Prince Bertrand.

=== Petrópolis line ===
- Pedro Gastão of Orléans-Braganza (1940–2007): Born in 1913, son of Isabel's eldest son, who had stated to not make use of all rights to the Brazilian throne. The validity of the statement as renunciation was disputed by Dom Pedro Gastão, who was mainly the recognized Pretender to the Brazilian Throne by Royal and Imperial Families around the World.
- Dom Pedro Carlos of Orléans-Braganza (2007–present): eldest son of Pedro Gastão live at the Imperial Palace of Grão-Pará.
  - Heir: Dom Pedro Tiago of Orléans-Braganza (born in 1979), recognized by several Imperial and Royal Families around the World as the Imperial Prince of Brazil.

== Past members and some descendants of the imperial family ==
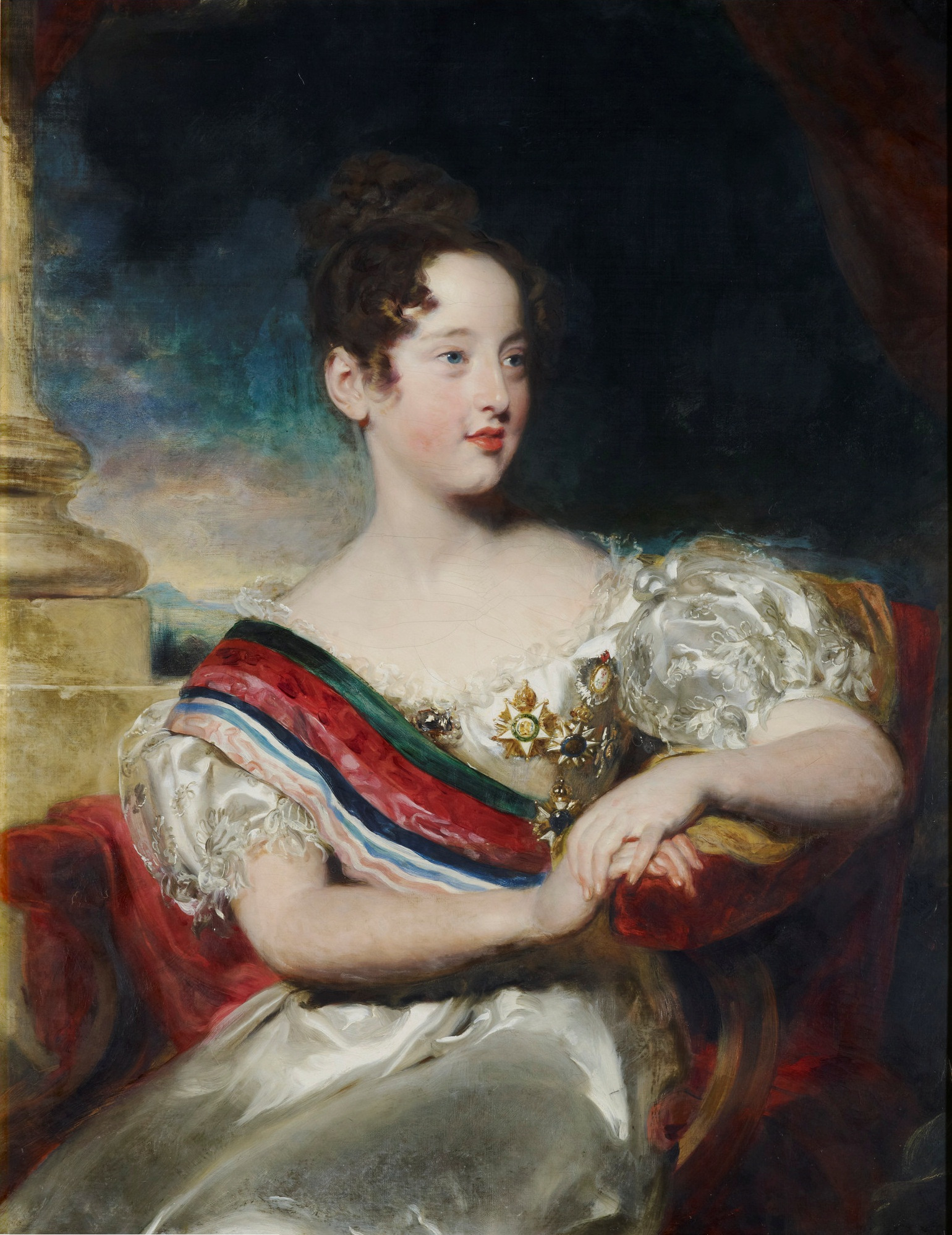
Portrait of Maria II by Thomas Lawrence. As the reigning Queen of Portugal, Maria II remained a member of the Brazilian imperial family and heir presumptive to her brother, Pedro II, as Princess Imperial of Brazil. She held this status until 30 October 1835, when she was formally excluded from the Brazilian line of succession following her definitive accession to the Portuguese throne.

- Dom Pedro I of Brazil (1798–1834)
  - Dona Maria II of Portugal (1819–1853)
  - Miguel, Prince of Beira (1820)
  - Dom João Carlos, Prince of Beira (1821–1822)
  - Dona Januária Maria, Princess Imperial of Brazil (1822–1901)
  - Princess Dona Paula Mariana of Brazil (1823–1833)
  - Princess Dona Francisca Carolina of Brazil (1824–1898)
  - Dom Pedro II of Brazil (1825–1891)
    - Dom Afonso Pedro de Alcântara, Prince Imperial of Brazil (1845–1847)
    - Dona Isabel Cristina, Princess Imperial of Brazil (1846–1921)
      - Dom Pedro de Alcântara, Prince of Orléans-Braganza (1875–1940)
        - Isabelle of Orléans-Braganza (1911–2003)
        - Pedro Gastão of Orléans-Braganza (1913–2007)
          - Pedro Carlos of Orléans-Braganza (born 1945)
            - Pedro Thiago of Orléans-Braganza (born 1979)
            - Filipe Rodrigo of Orléans-Braganza (born 1982)
          - Maria da Glória of Orléans-Braganza (born 1946)
        - Maria Francisca of Orléans-Braganza (1914–1968)
        - João Maria of Orléans-Braganza (1916–2005)
      - Prince Dom Luiz Maria of Orléans-Braganza (1878–1920)
        - Pedro Henrique of Orléans-Braganza (1909–1981)
          - Luiz of Orleans-Braganza (1938–2022)
          - Eudes Maria of Orléans-Braganza (1939–2020)
            - Luiz Philippe of Orléans-Braganza (born 1969)
          - Bertrand of Orléans-Braganza (born 1941)
          - Antônio João of Orléans-Braganza (1950–2024)
            - Pedro Luiz of Orléans-Braganza (1983–2009)
            - Rafael Antônio of Orléans-Braganza (born 1986)
          - Eleonora Maria of Orléans-Braganza (born 1953)
            - Henrique Antônio de Ligne (born 1989)
        - Luís Gastão of Orléans-Braganza (1911–1931)
        - Pia Maria of Orléans-Braganza (1913–2000)
      - Prince Dom Antônio Gastão of Orléans-Braganza (1881–1918)
    - Princess Dona Leopoldina of Brazil (1847–1871)
      - Prince Pedro Augusto of Saxe-Coburg and Gotha (1866–1934)
      - Prince Augusto Leopoldo of Saxe-Coburg and Gotha (1867–1922)
        - Princess Teresa Cristina of Saxe-Coburg and Gotha (1902–1990)
          - Carlos Tasso of Saxe-Coburg and Braganza (born 1931)
      - Prince José Fernando of Saxe-Coburg and Gotha (1869–1888)
    - Dom Pedro Afonso, Prince Imperial of Brazil (1848–1850)
  - Princess Dona Maria Amélia of Brazil (1831–1853)

== Genealogy ==
Genealogical tree of the Brazilian branch House of Braganza and the subsequent House of Orléans-Braganza, cadet branch and current Imperial Family.

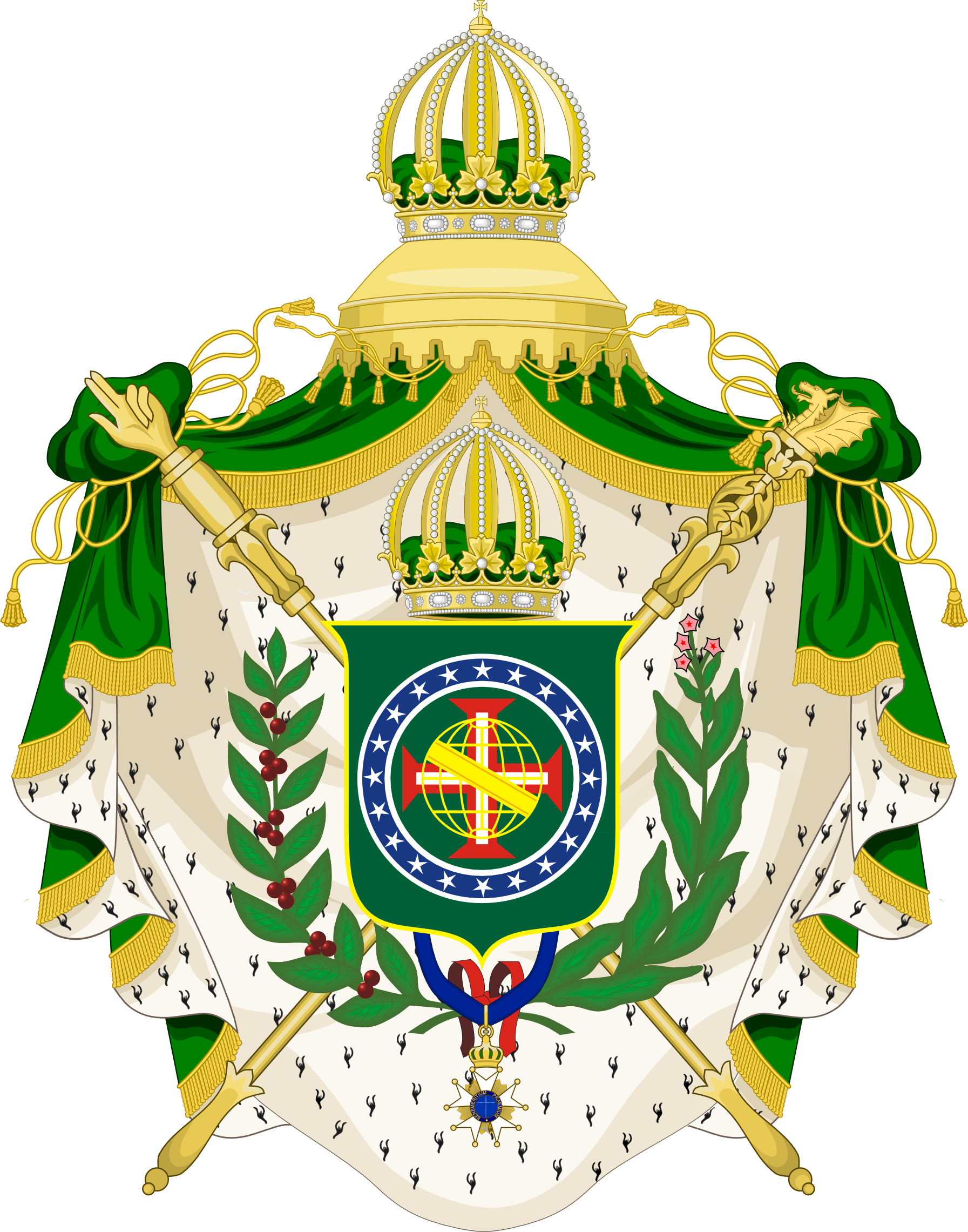
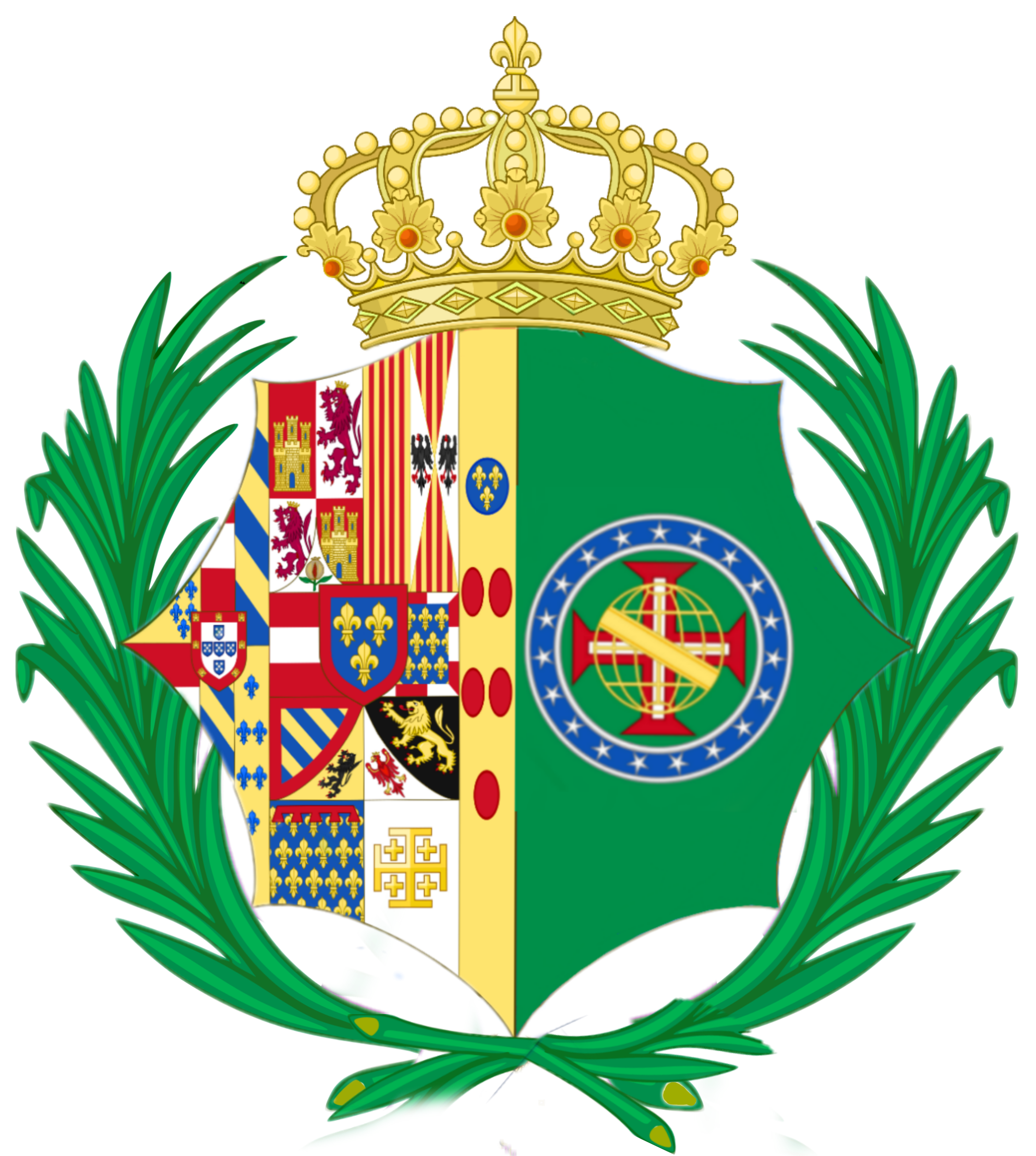
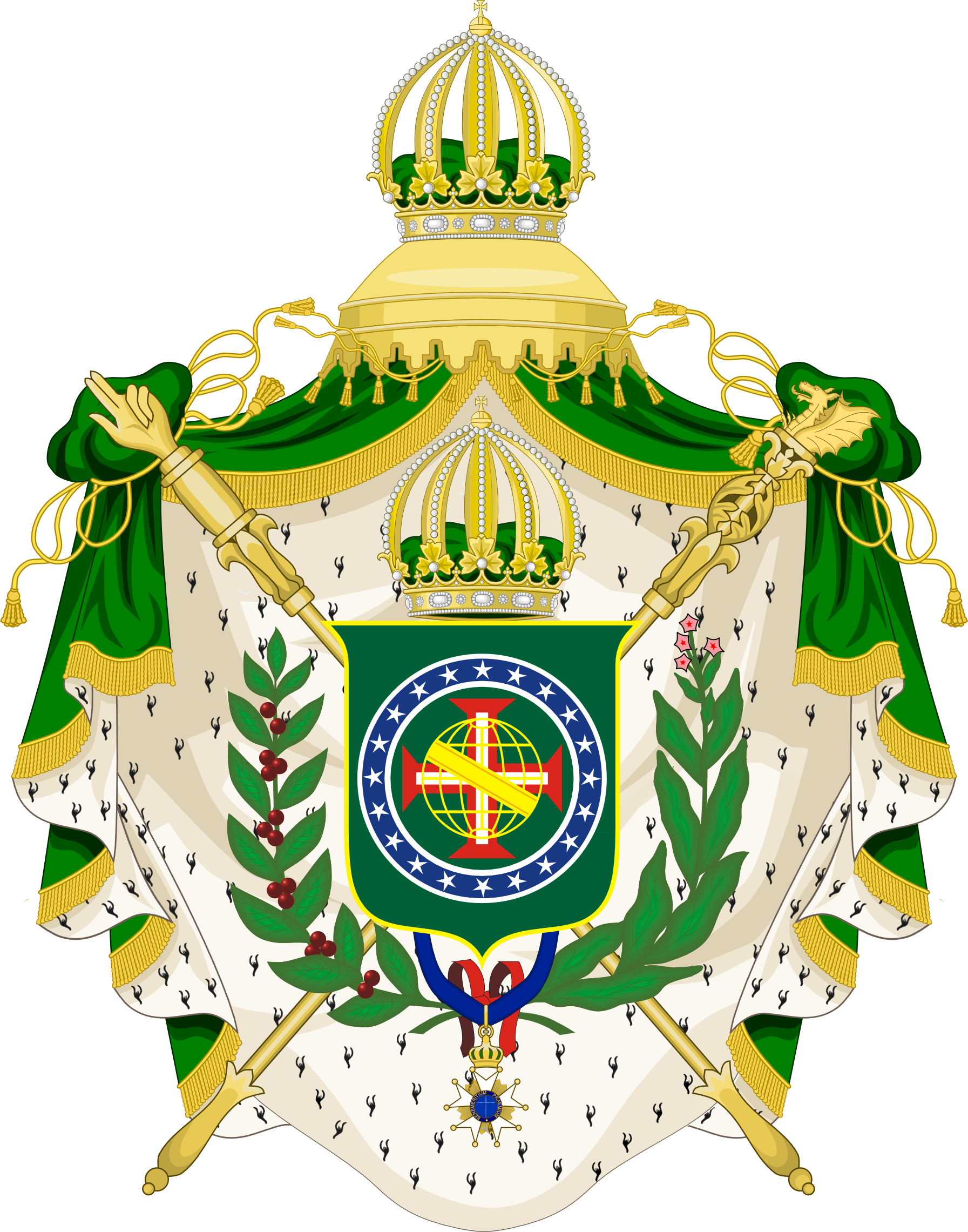
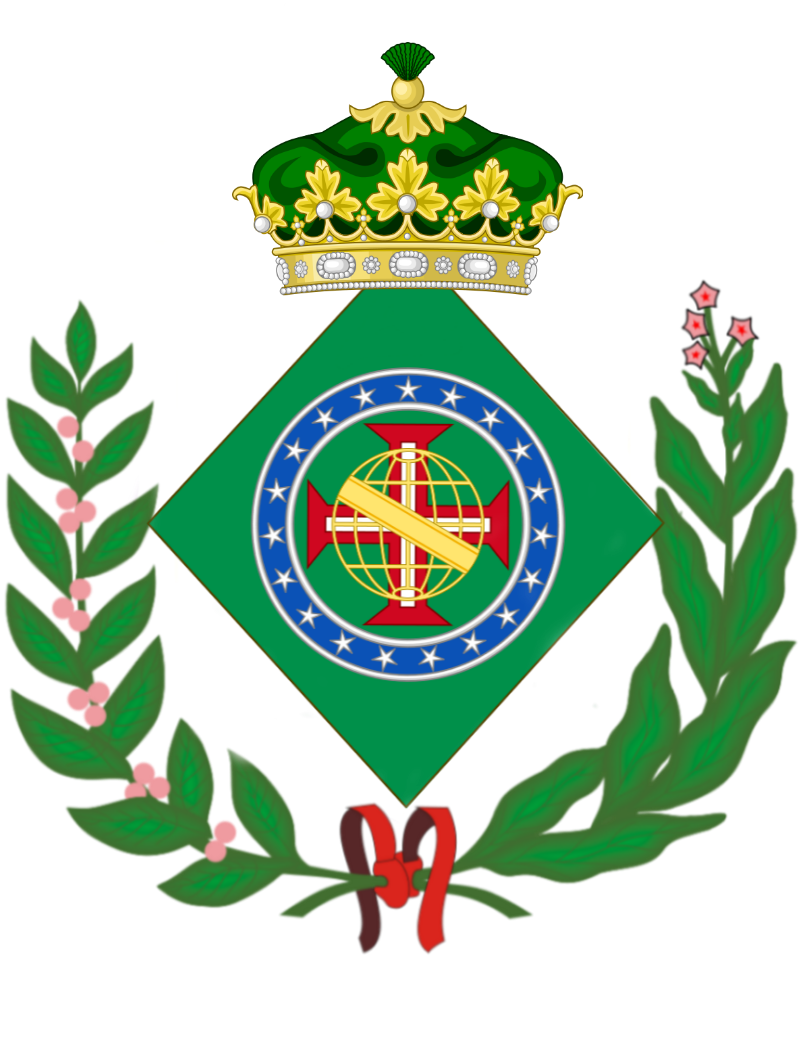
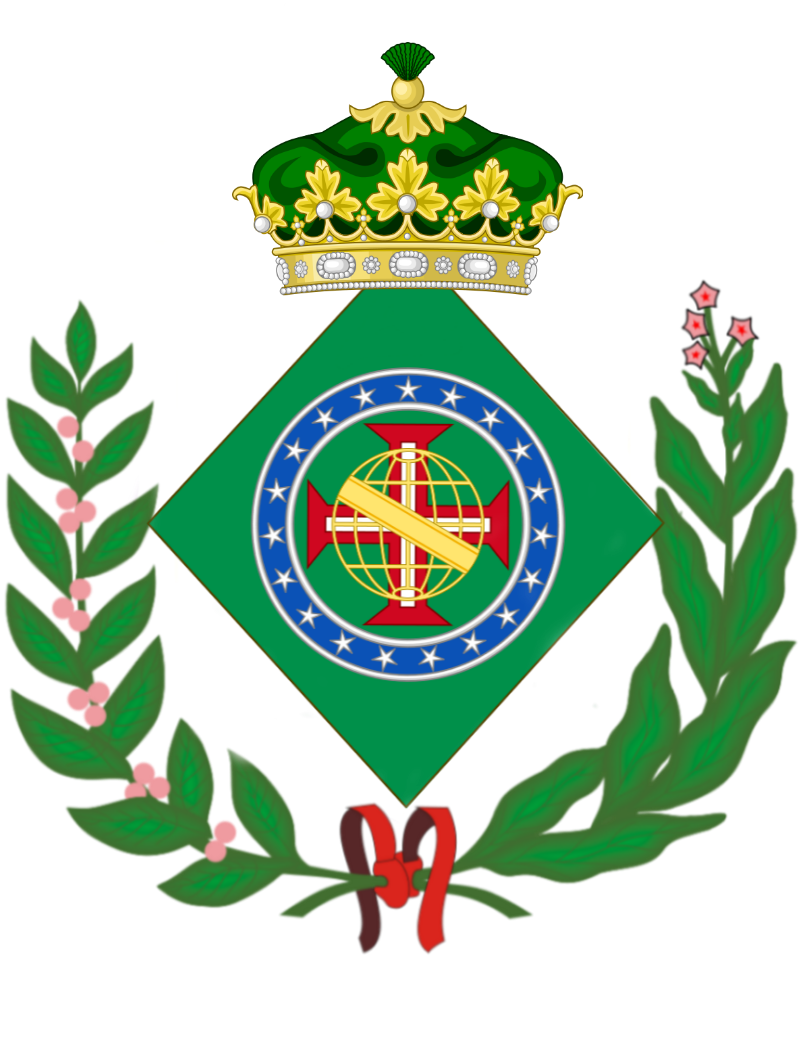
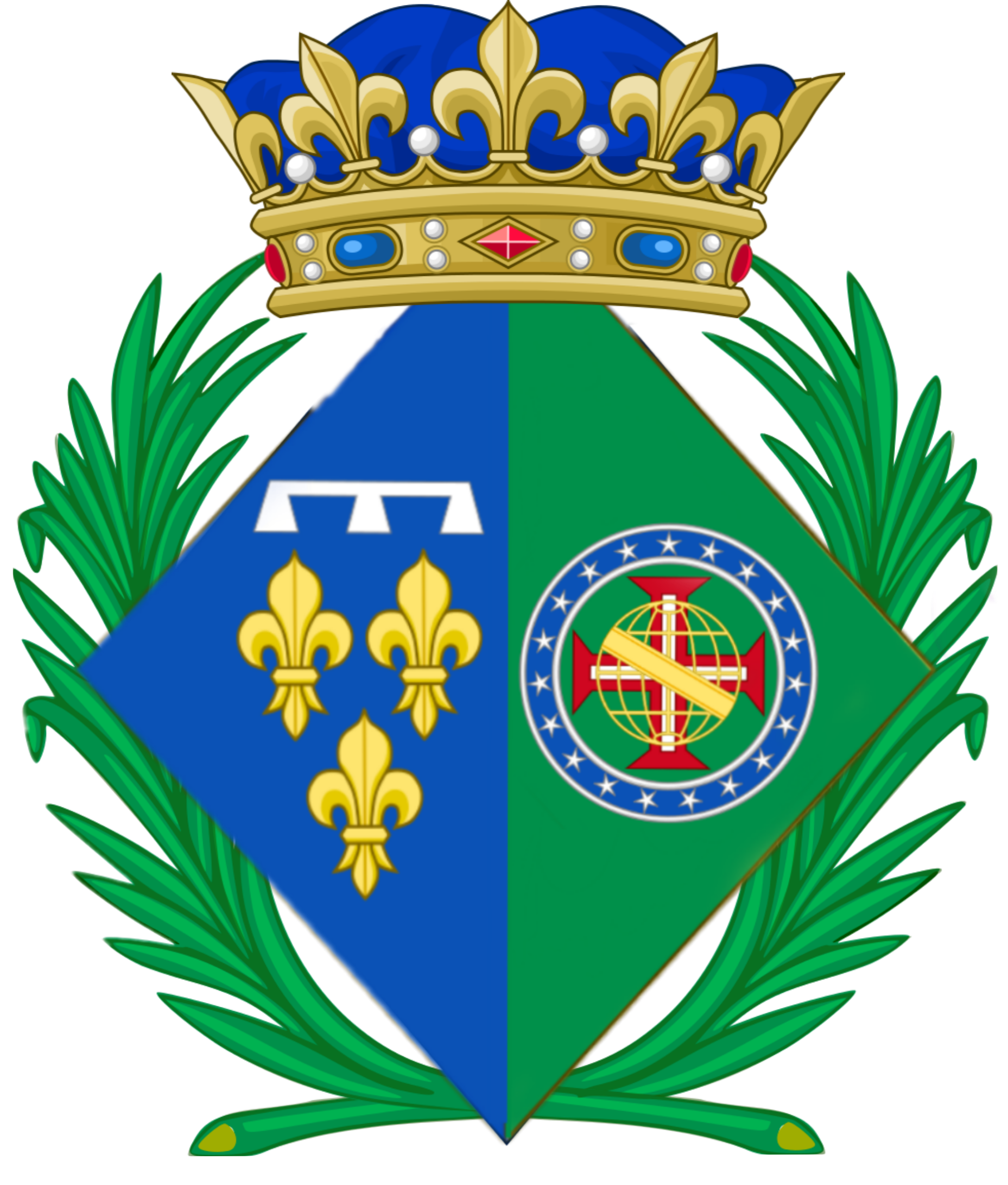
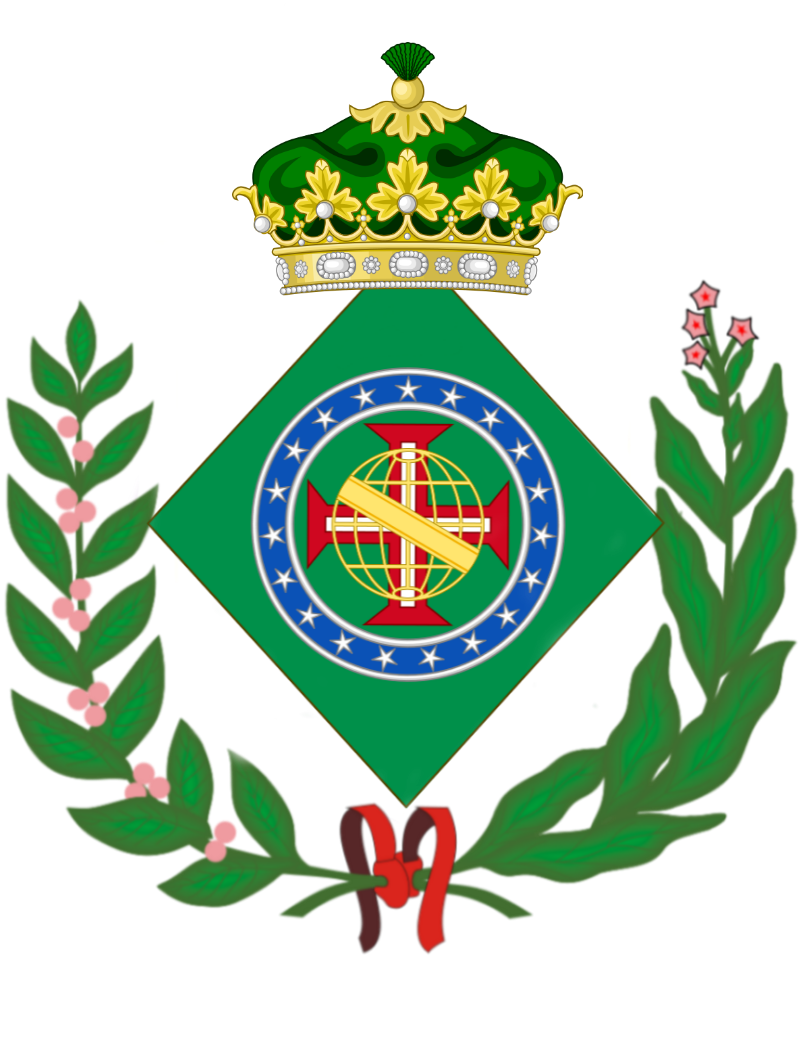
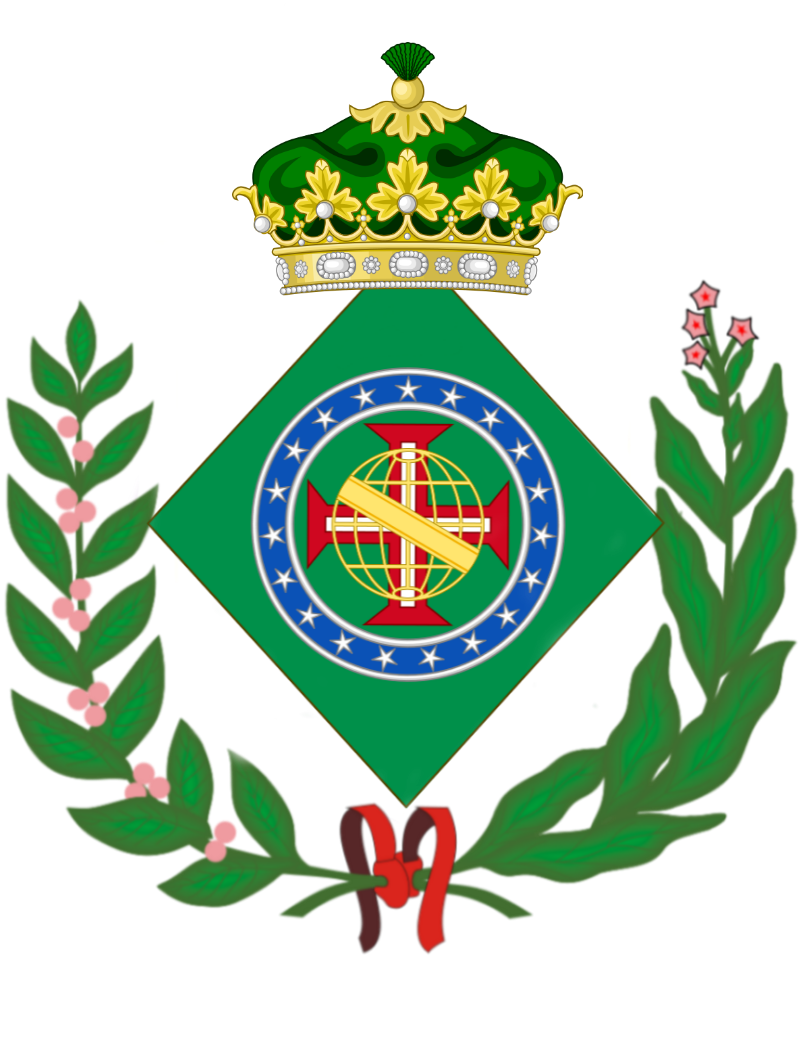
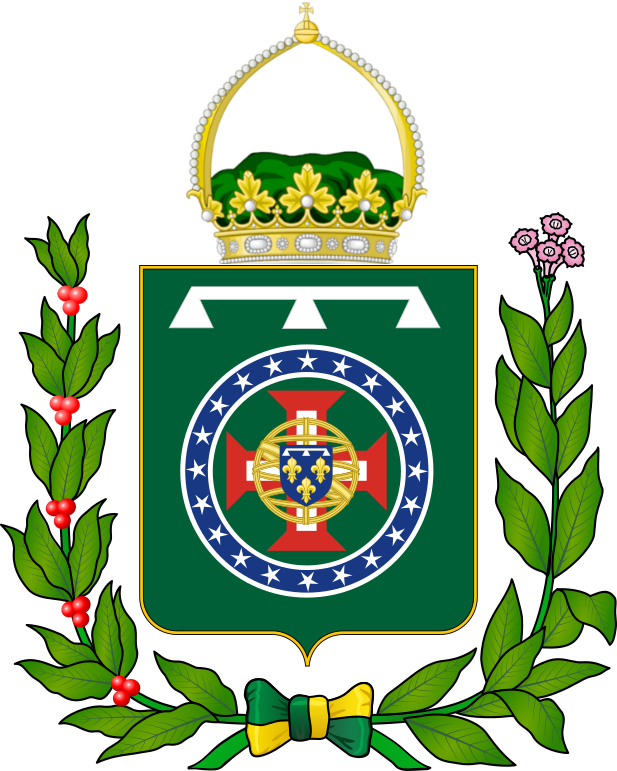
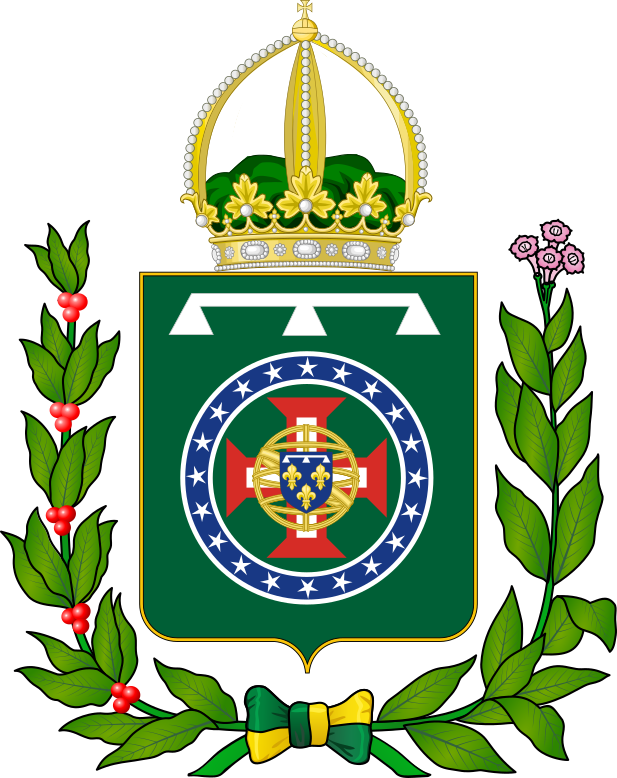
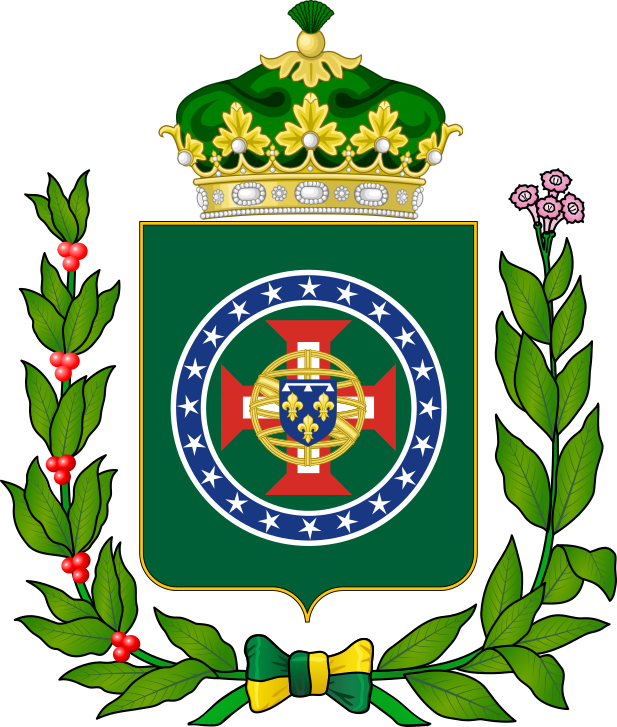
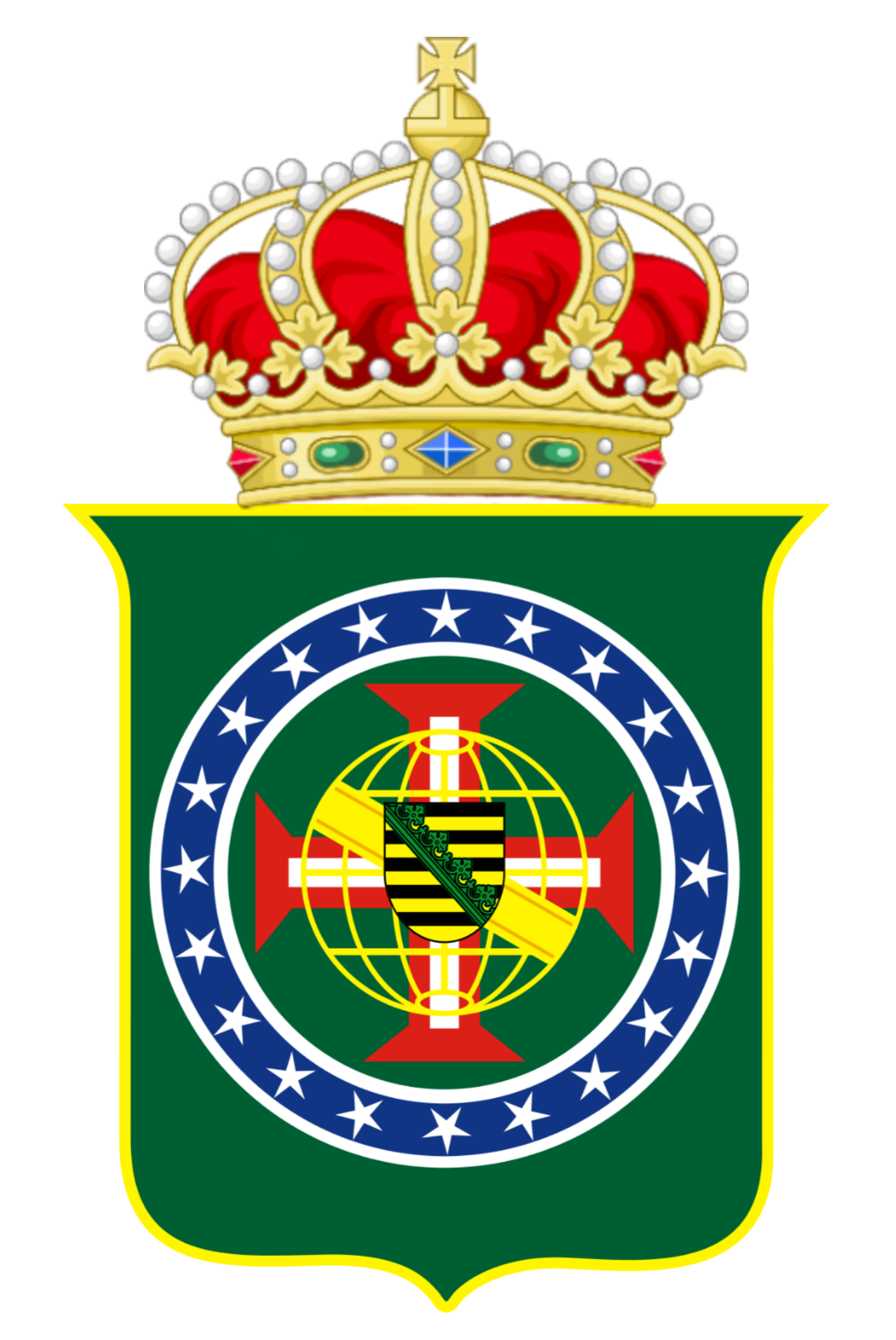
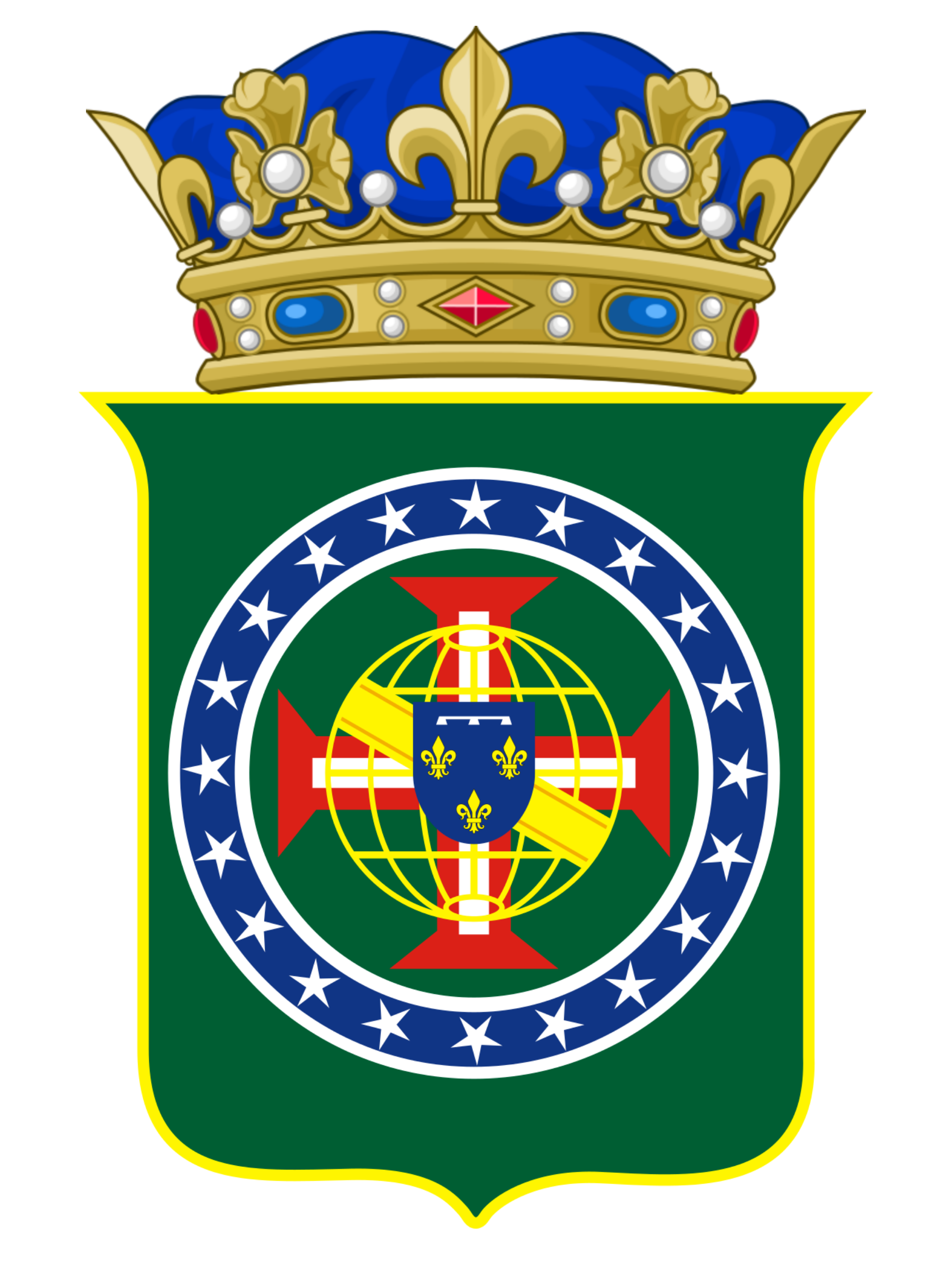
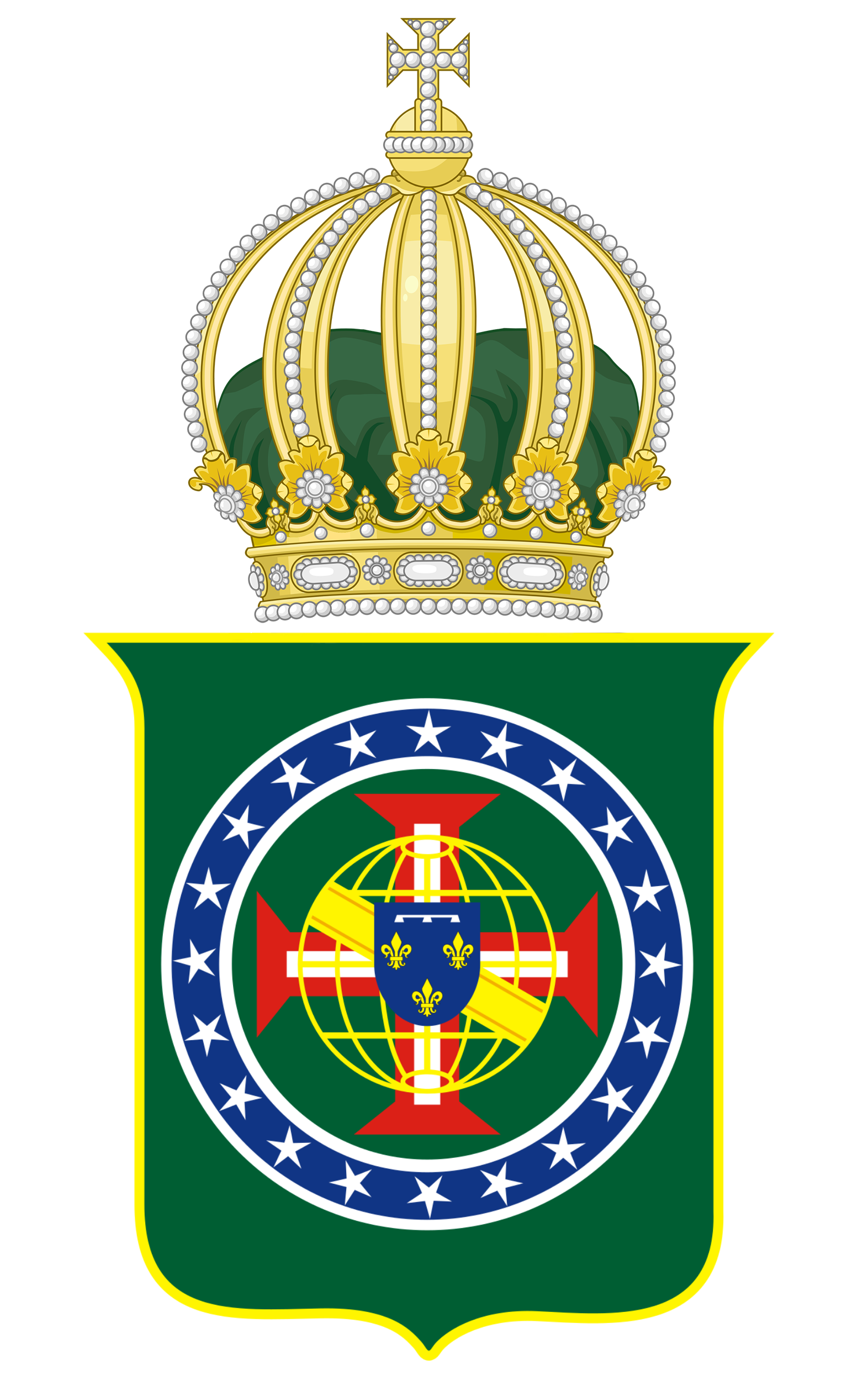
Emperor-King Pedro I/IV; Emperor of Brazil; King of Portugal and the Algarves (1798–1834)
Queen Maria II; Queen of Portugal and the Algarves; Princess Imperial of Brazil (1819–1853)	Princess Januária; Princess Imperial of Brazil; Countess of Aquila (1822–1901)	Emperor Pedro II; Emperor of Brazil (1825–1891)	Princess Paula; Princess of Brazil (1823–1833)	Princess Francisca; Princess of Brazil; Princess of Joinville (1824–1898)	Princess Maria Amélia; Princess of Brazil (1831–1853)
From her descends the Portuguese Royal Family	Princess Isabel; Princess Imperial of Brazil (1846–1921)	Princess Leopoldina; Princess of Brazil; Princess of Saxe-Coburg and Gotha (1847–1871)
Prince Pedro de Alcântara; Prince of Grão-Pará; Prince of Orléans-Braganza (1875–1940)	Prince Luís; Prince Imperial of Brazil; Prince of Orléans-Braganza (1878–1920)	Prince Antônio Gastão; Prince of Brazil; Prince of Orléans-Braganza (1881–1918)	From her descends the Saxe-Coburg and Braganza branch of the Brazilian Imperial Family
From him descends the Petrópolis branch of the House of Orléans-Braganza	From him descends the Vassouras branch of the House of Orléans-Braganza

== Armorial ==
Coat of arms

Title
Emperor of Brazil
Tenure
1822–1889
Coat of arms

Title
Prince Imperial of Brazil
Tenure
1824–1889
Coat of arms

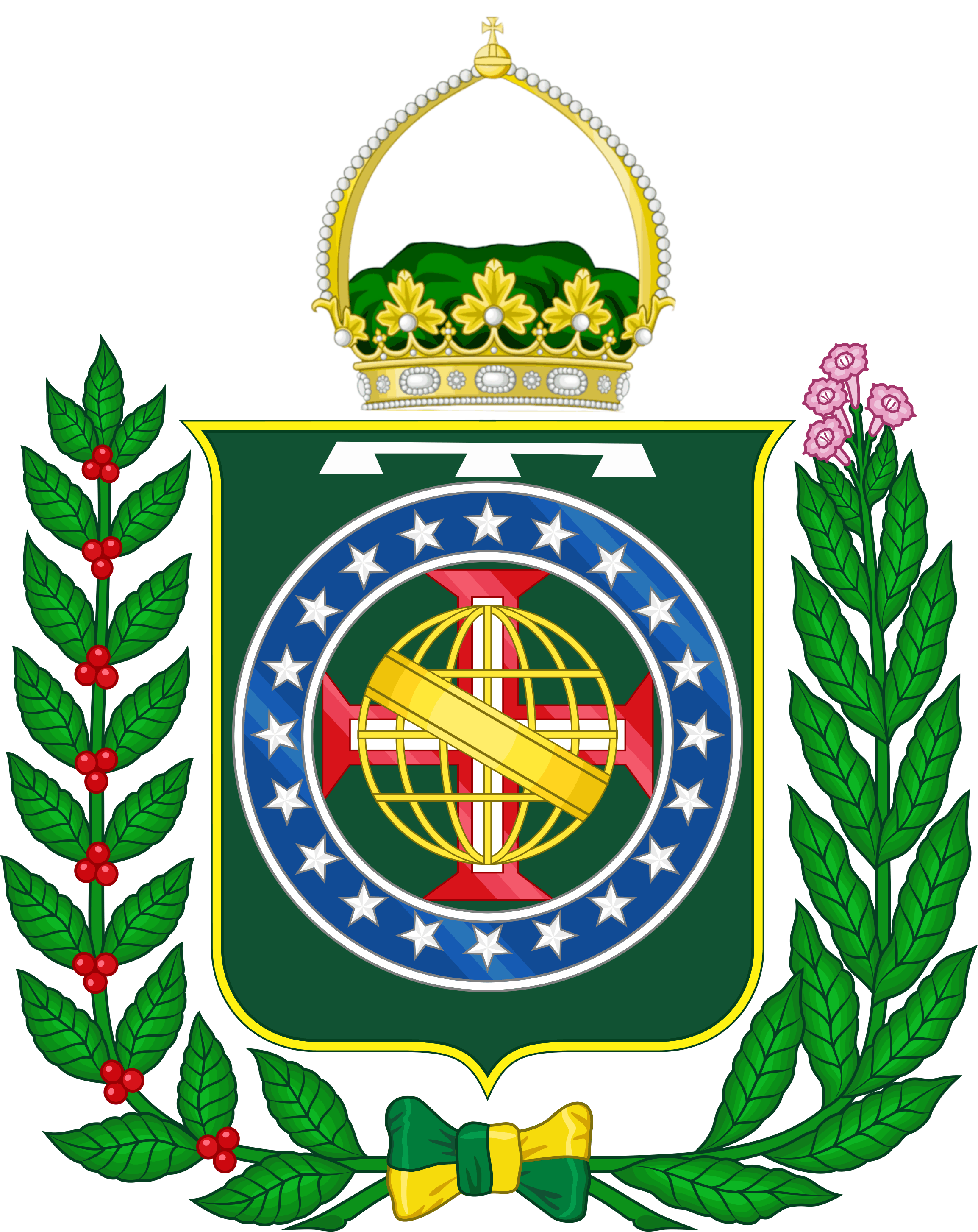

Title
Prince of Grão-Pará
Tenure
Prince of Grão-Pará: 1824–1889
Coat of arms

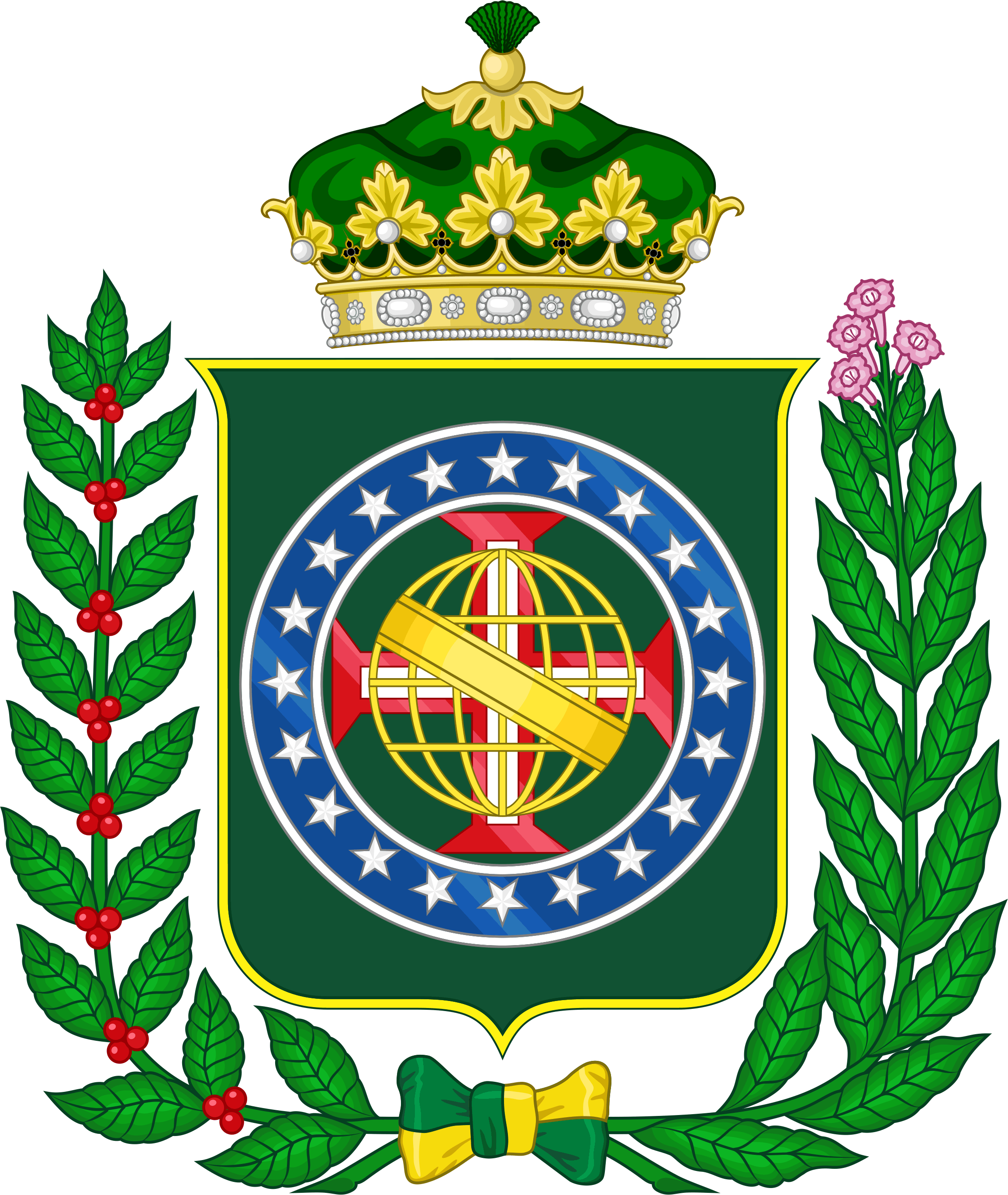

Title
Prince of Brazil
Tenure
Prince of Brazil: 1824–1889
Coat of arms

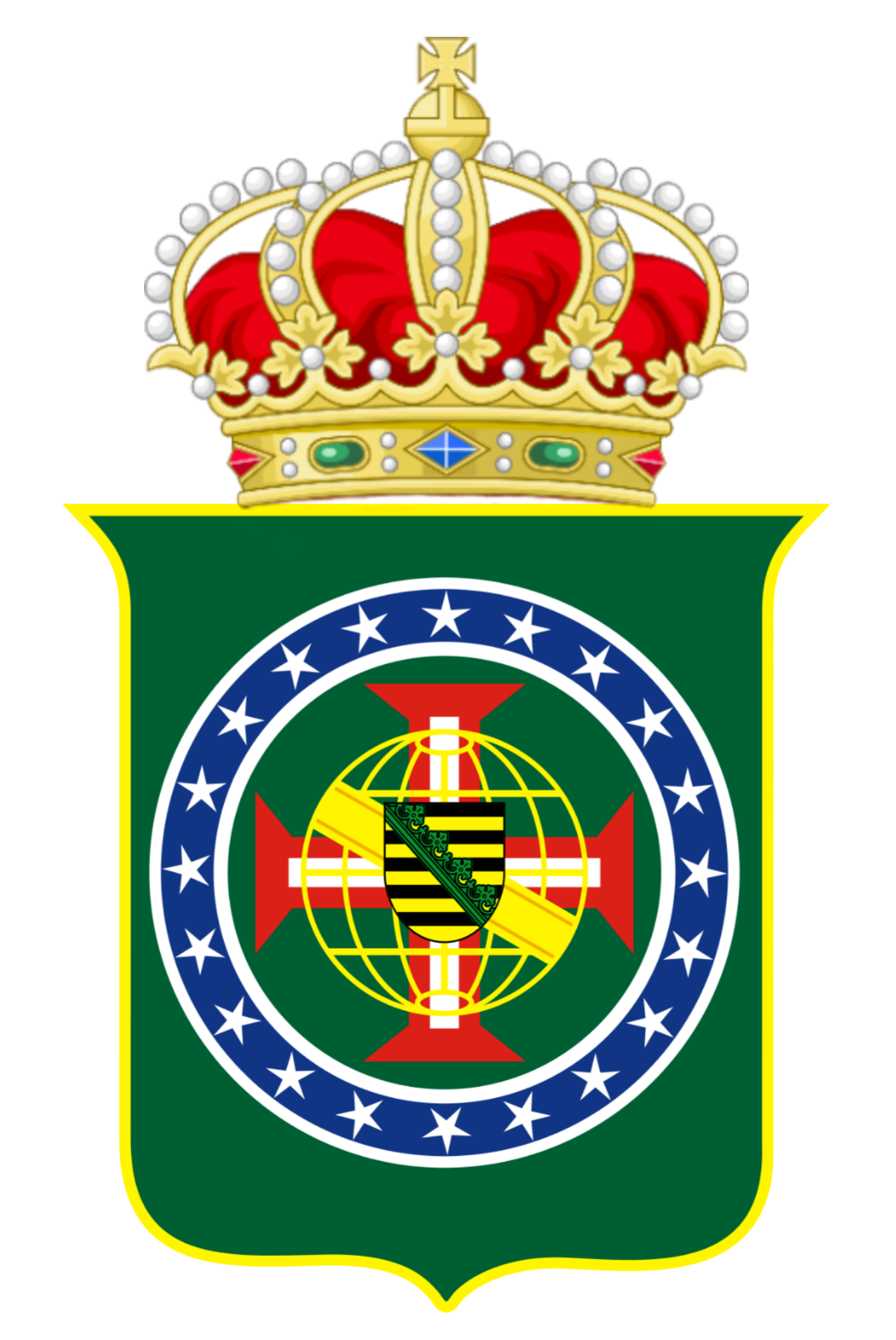

Title
Prince of Saxe-Coburg and Braganza
Tenure
Prince of Saxe-Coburg and Braganza: 1866–present
Coat of arms

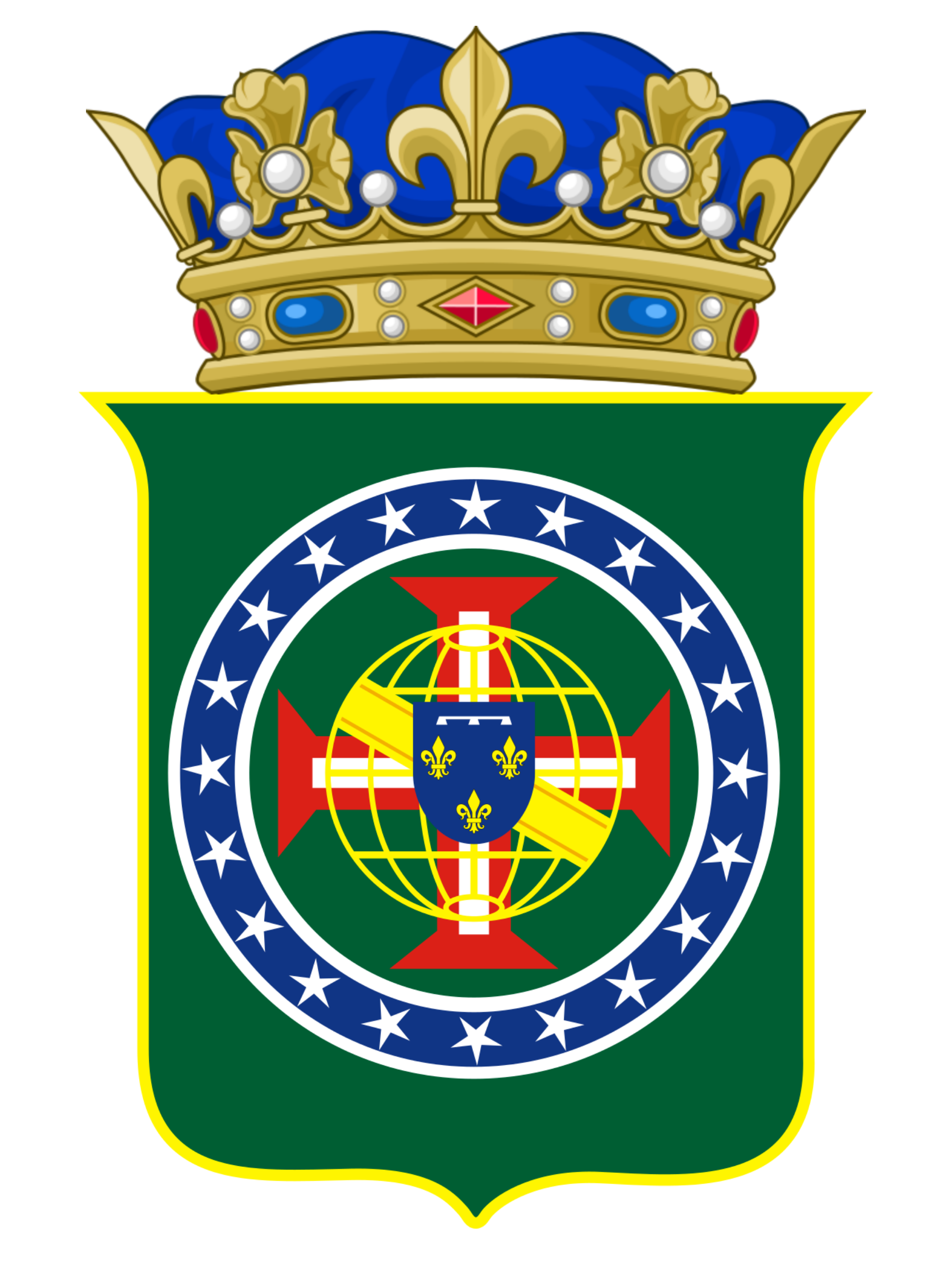

Title
Prince of Orléans-Braganza
Tenure
Prince of Orléans and Braganza: 1909–present

== Estates and properties ==
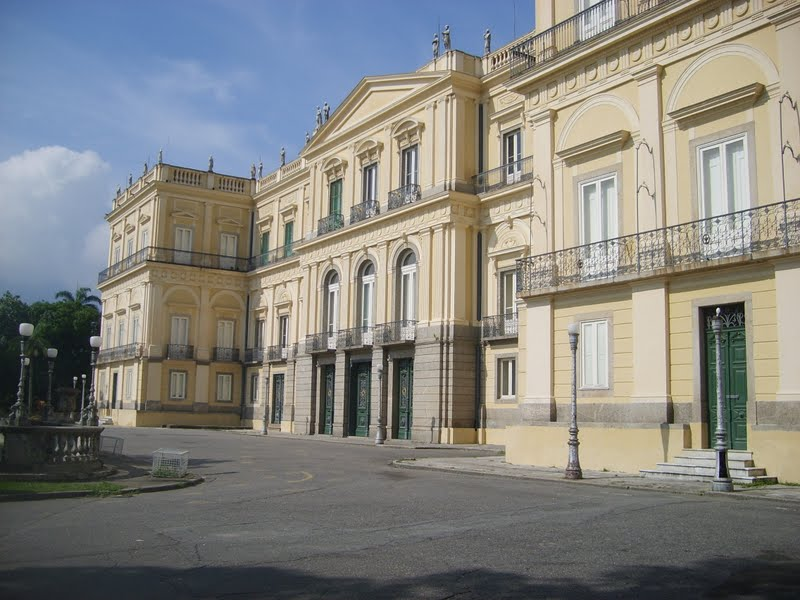
Imperial Palace of São Cristóvão, Quinta da Boa Vista, Rio de Janeiro

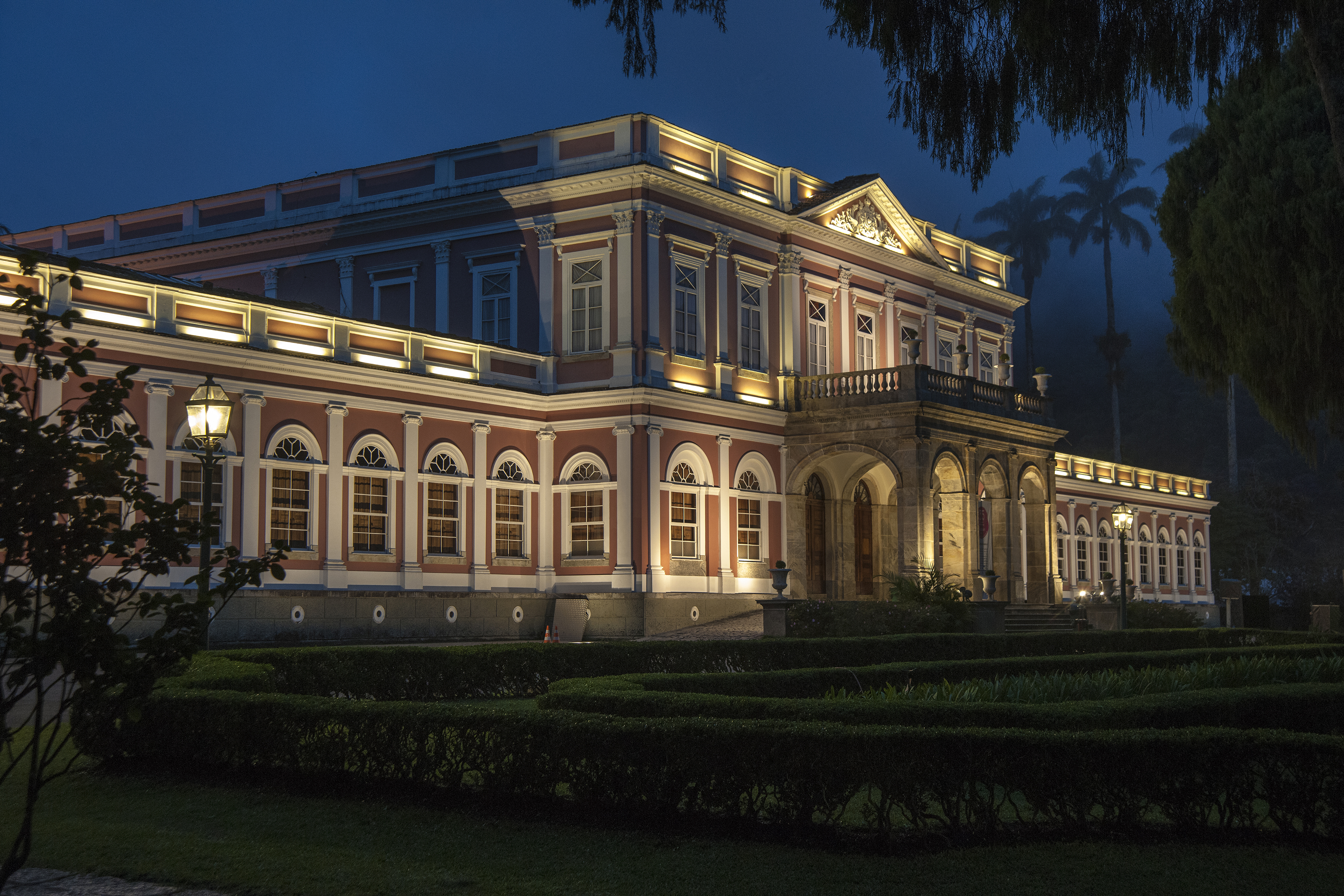
Imperial Palace of Petrópolis, Petrópolis

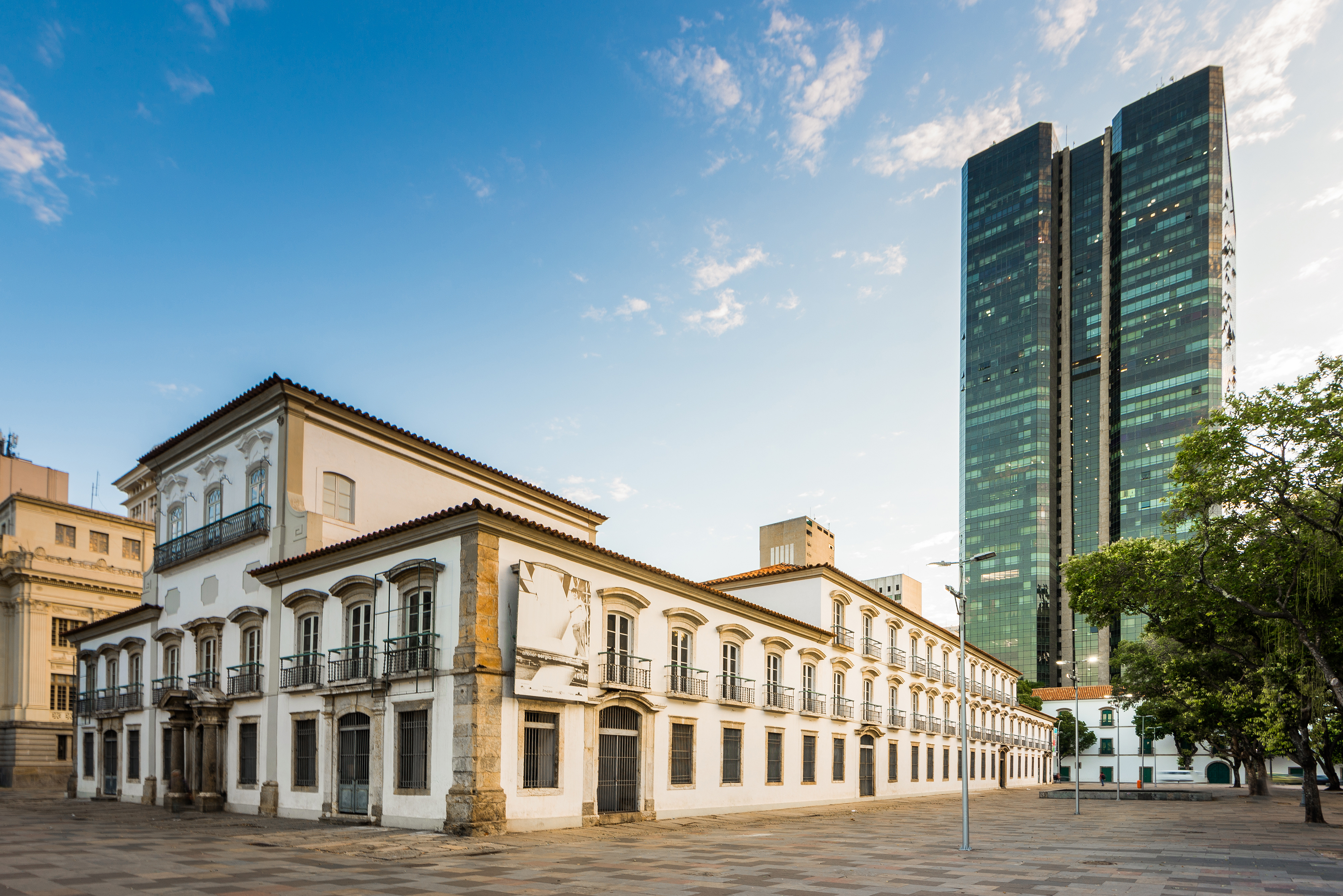
Imperial Palace of Rio de Janeiro, Rio de Janeiro

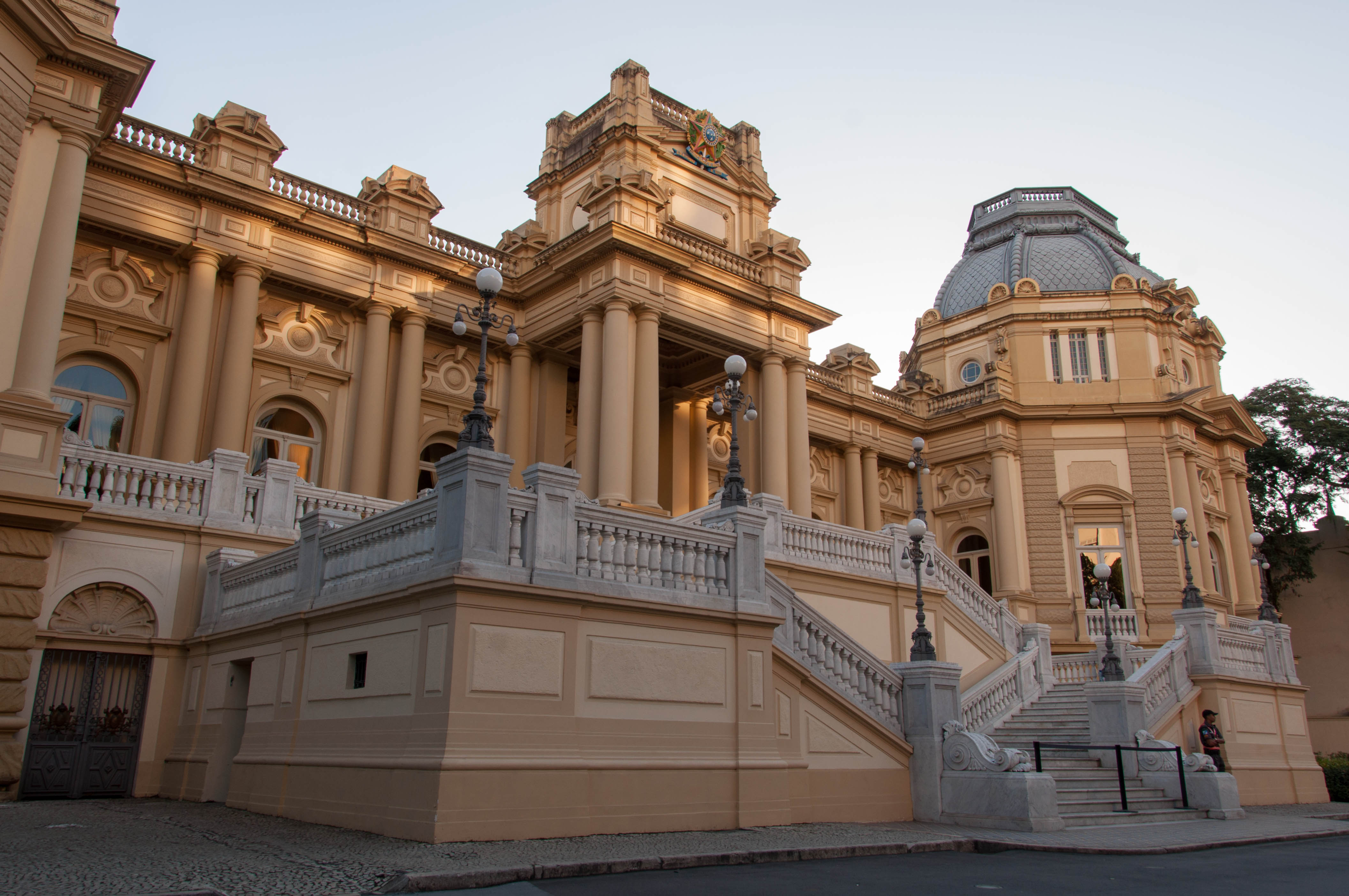
Isabel Palace, Rio de Janeiro

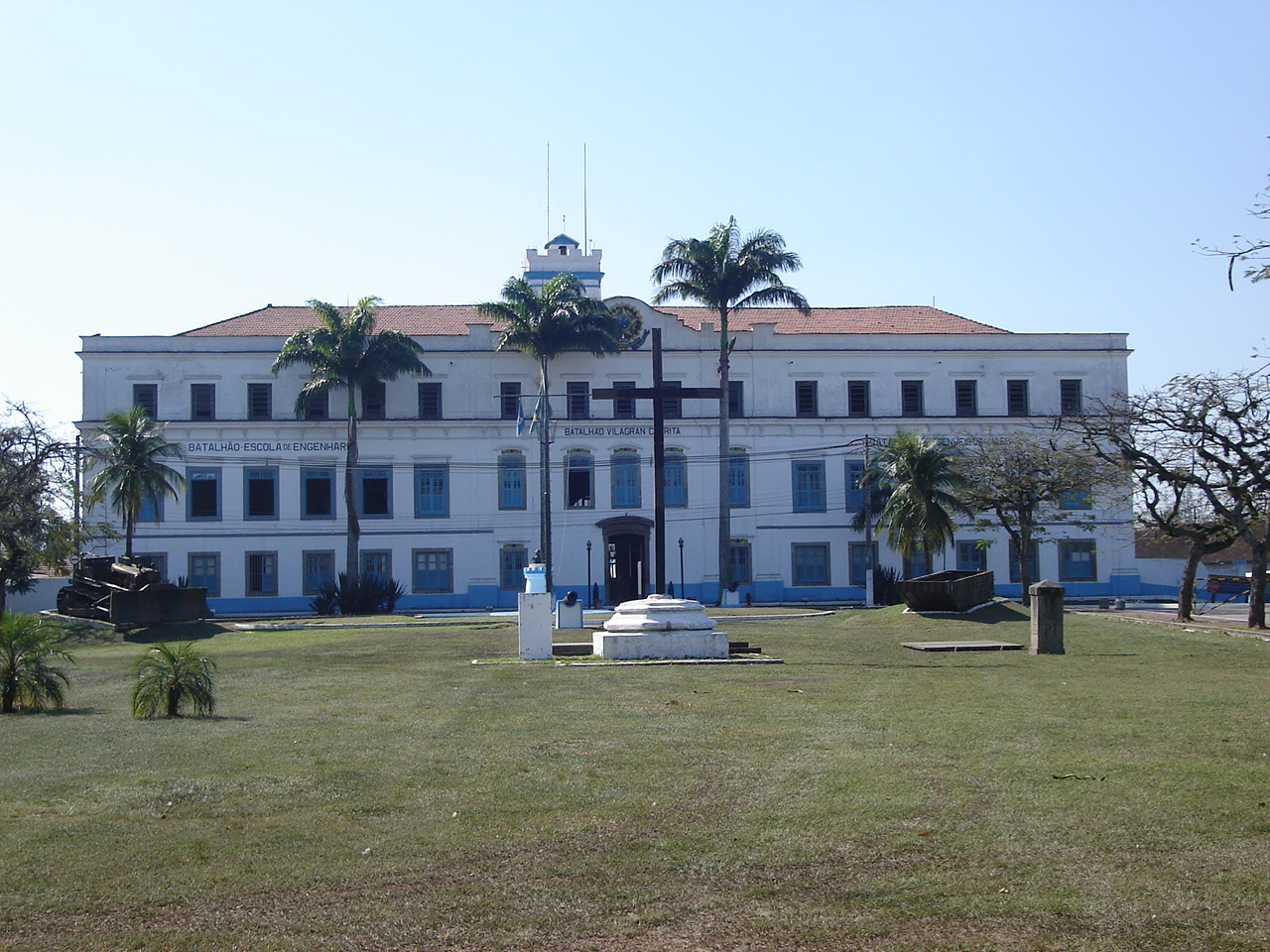
Imperial Santa Cruz Estate, Santa Cruz

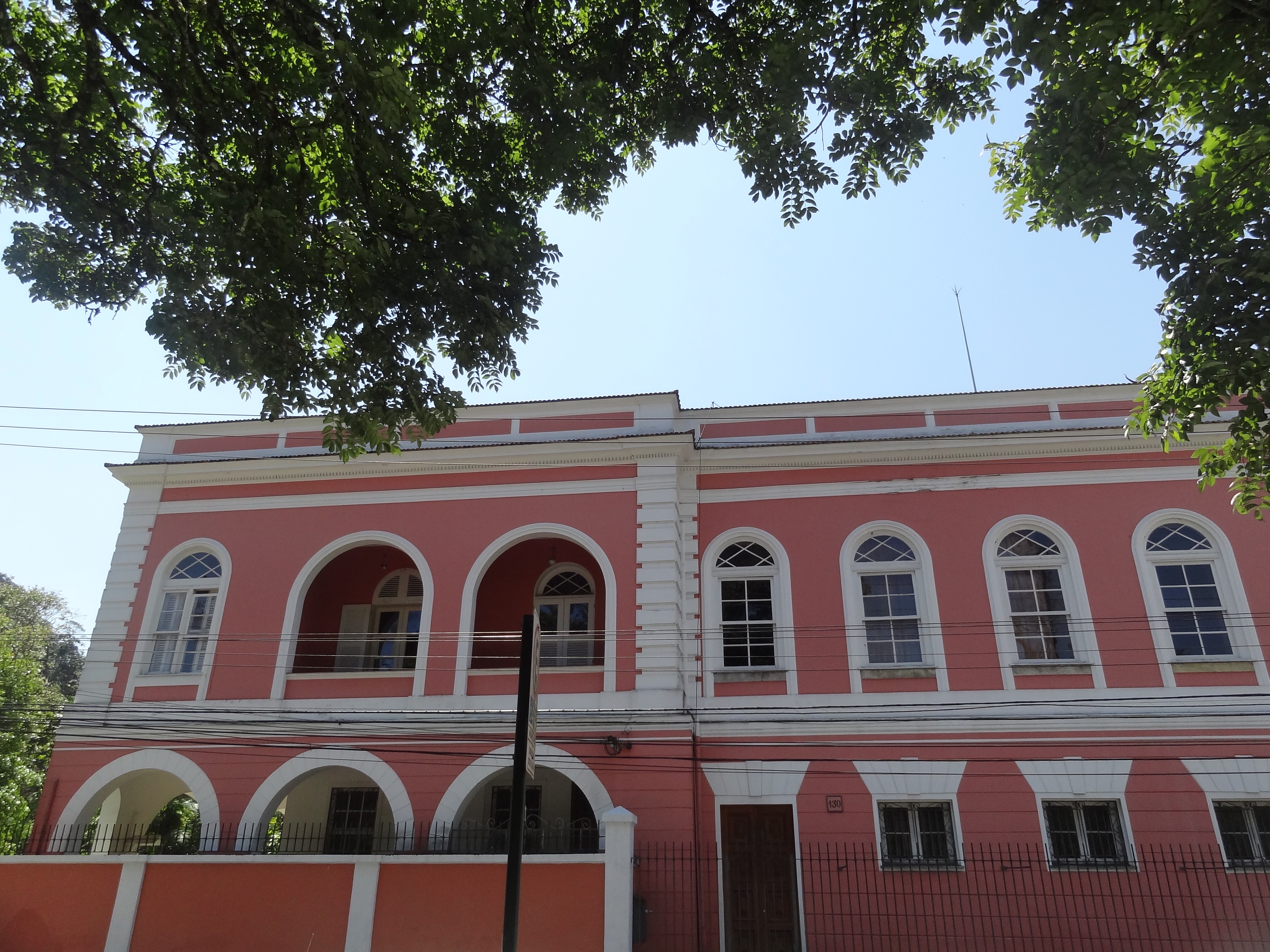
Palace of Grão-Pará, Petrópolis

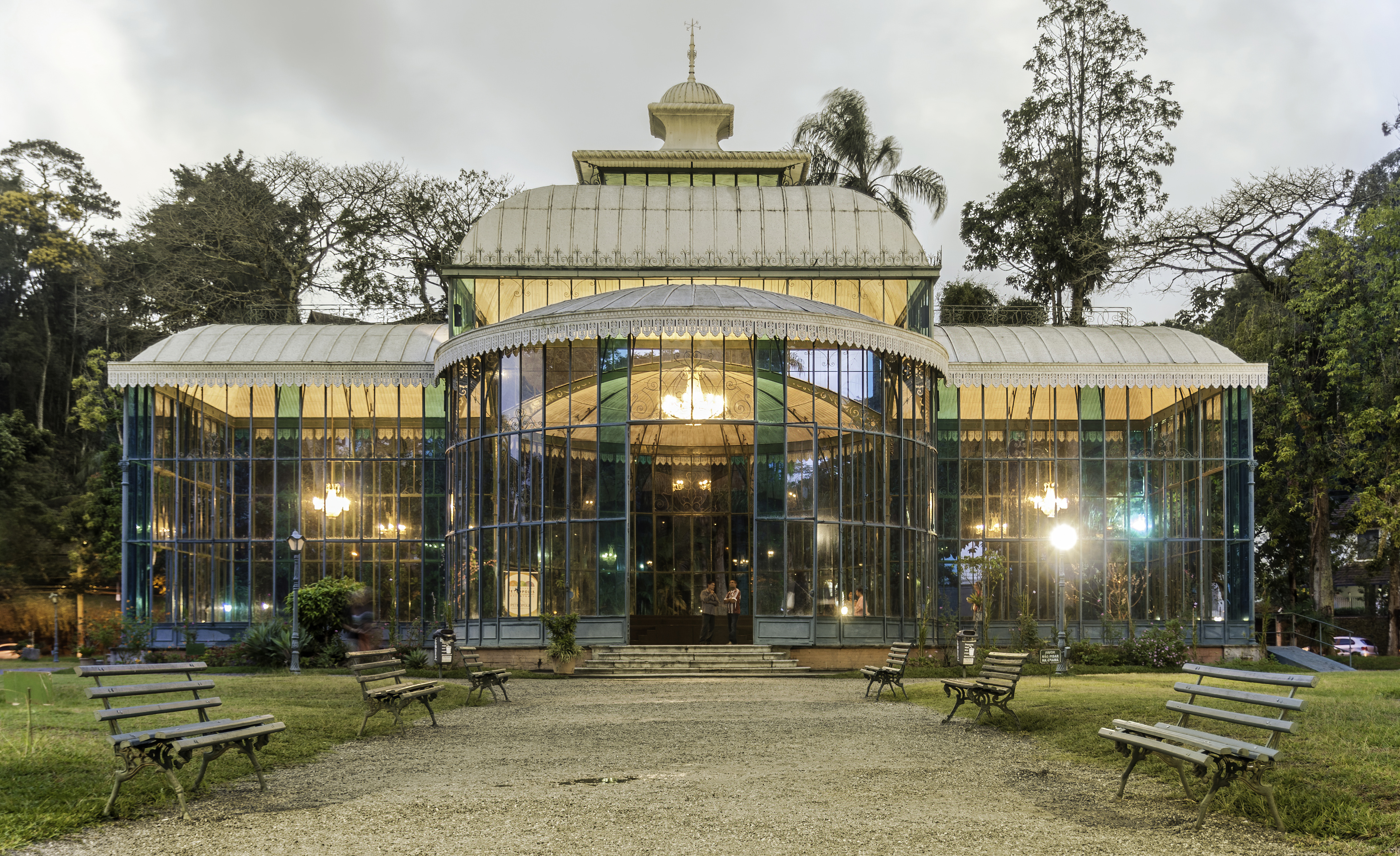
Crystal Palace, Petrópolis

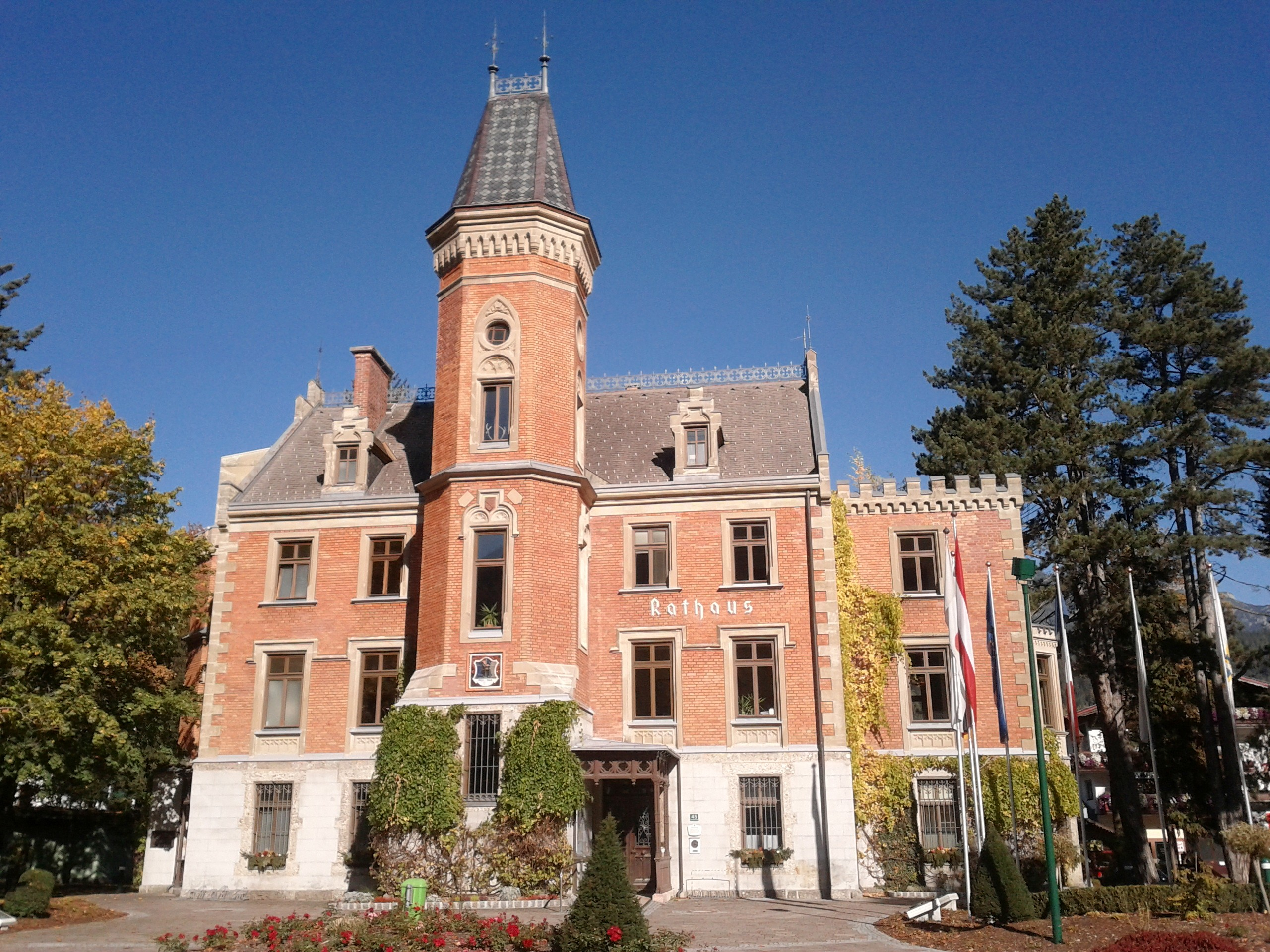
Schladming Castle, Schladming

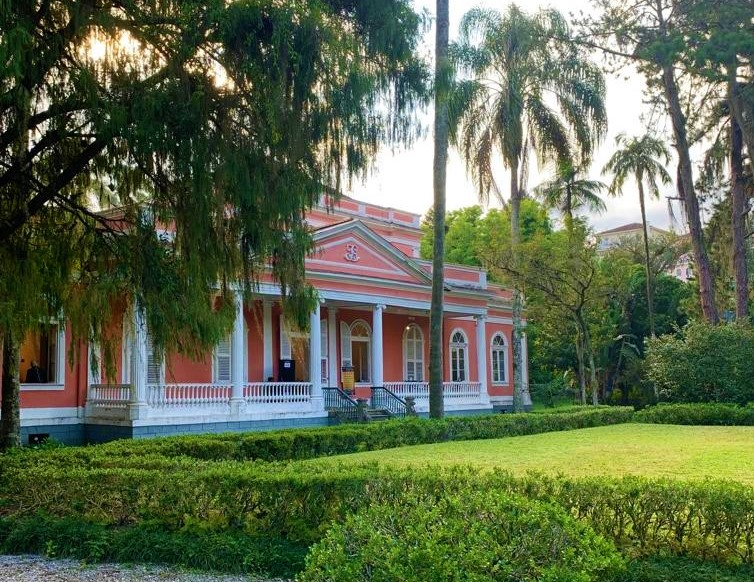
Princess Isabel House, Petrópolis

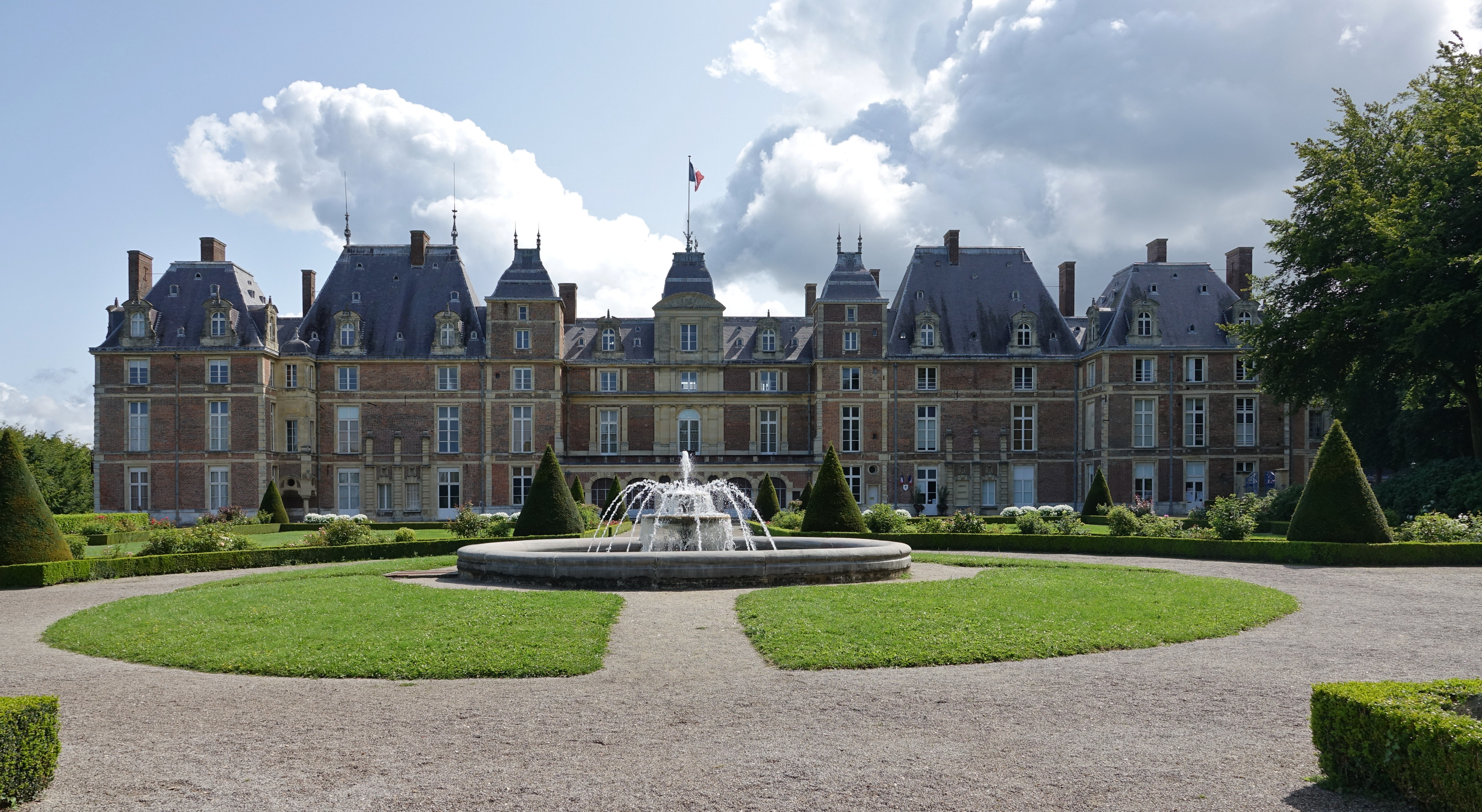
Château d'Eu, Eu

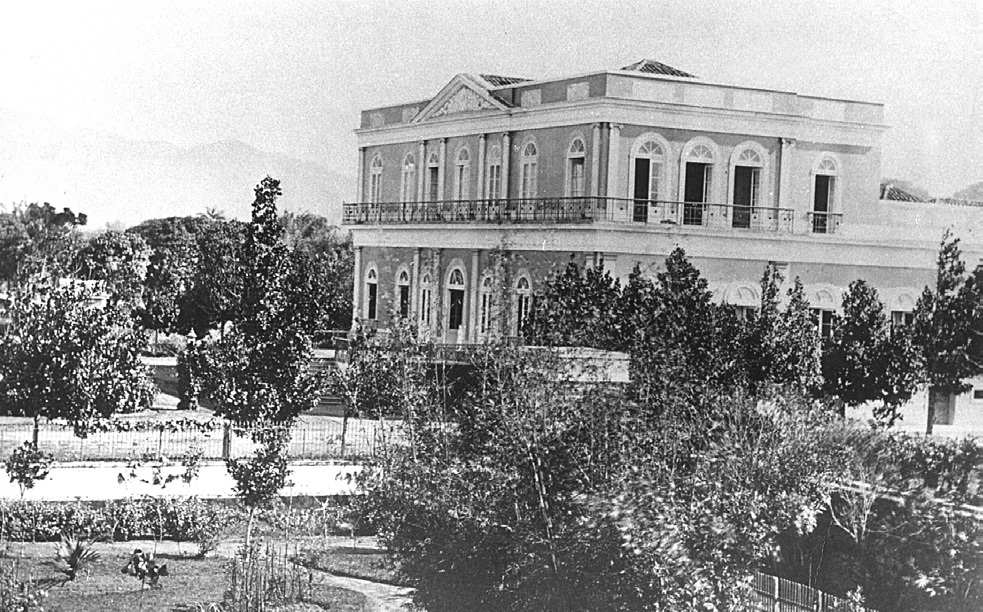
Leopoldina Palace, Rio de Janeiro

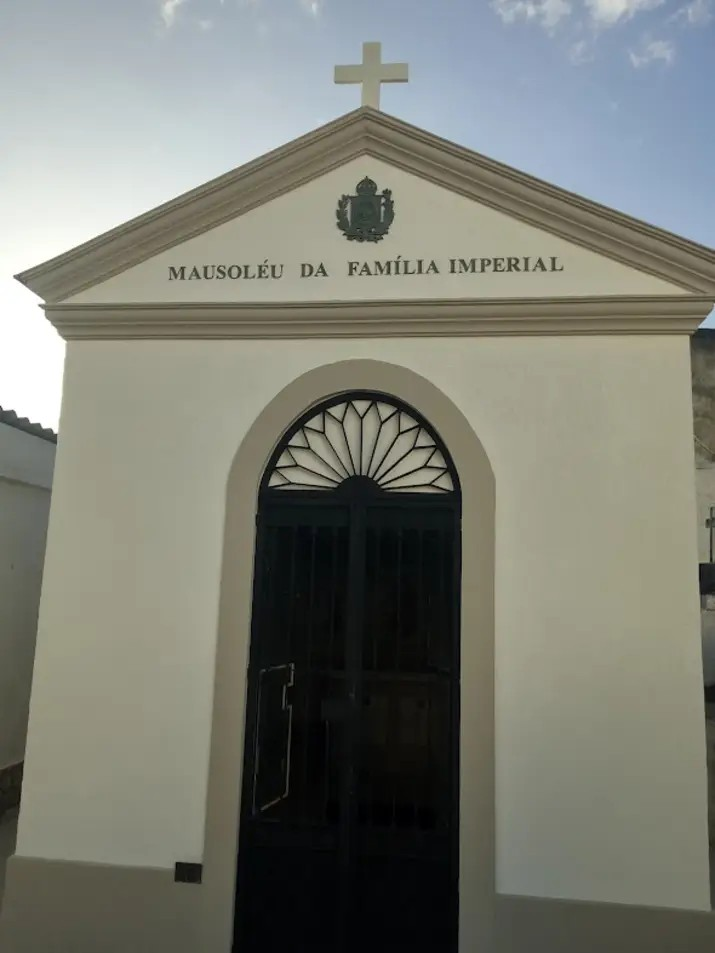
The Imperial Family Mausoleum, Vassouras

== See also ==
- History of Brazil
- House of Orléans-Braganza
- Emperor of Brazil
- Prince Imperial of Brazil
- Prince of Grão-Pará
- Head of the Imperial House of Brazil

*Royal House* Brazilian House of Braganza Cadet branch of the Portuguese House of Braganza
Regnal titles
New title	Ruling House of the Empire of Brazil; 1822–1889	Monarchy Abolished; See República Velha
Titles in pretence
Preceded by Itself as the reigning house	— TITULAR — Claimant House of the Brazilian monarchy 1889–present Reason for succession failure: Brazilian monarchy abolished	Claimant as House of Orléans-Braganza since 1921
