= Luiz of Orléans-Braganza =

Claimant to the defunct Brazilian throne (1938–2022)

Prince Luiz
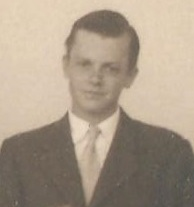

Head of the Imperial House of Brazil (disputed)
- Pretence: 5 July 1981 – 15 July 2022
- Predecessor: Pedro Henrique
- Successor: Bertrand
- Born: 6 June 1938; Mandelieu-la-Napoule, France
- Died: 15 July 2022 (aged 84); Santa Catarina Hospital, São Paulo, Brazil
- Burial: Cemitério da Consolação, São Paulo, Brazil
Names
- Luiz Gastão Maria José Pio Miguel Gabriel Rafael Gonzaga de Orléans e Bragança e Wittelsbach
- House: Orléans-Braganza
- Father: Pedro Henrique of Orléans-Braganza
- Mother: Maria Elisabeth of Bavaria
- Religion: Roman Catholic

Prince Luiz of Orléans-Braganza (6 June 1938 – 15 July 2022) was a Brazilian royal claimant who served as head of the Vassouras branch of the Imperial House of Brazil from 1981 until his death. He was the eldest son of Prince Pedro Henrique of Orléans-Braganza and Princess Maria Elisabeth of Bavaria, and was regarded by his supporters as pretender to the defunct title of Emperor of Brazil.

The Vassouras branch asserts its claim to the former Brazilian throne in opposition to the Petrópolis branch, led by Pedro Carlos Orléans-Braganza. Both Luiz and Pedro Carlos were great-grandsons of Princess Isabel, daughter and heiress of Emperor Pedro II, but the two lines diverged following a dynastic dispute involving their fathers, who were first cousins. Throughout his life, Prince Luiz actively upheld the Vassouras claim, engaging in public discourse, monarchist movements, and initiatives related to Brazil’s imperial history and legacy.

== Early life ==
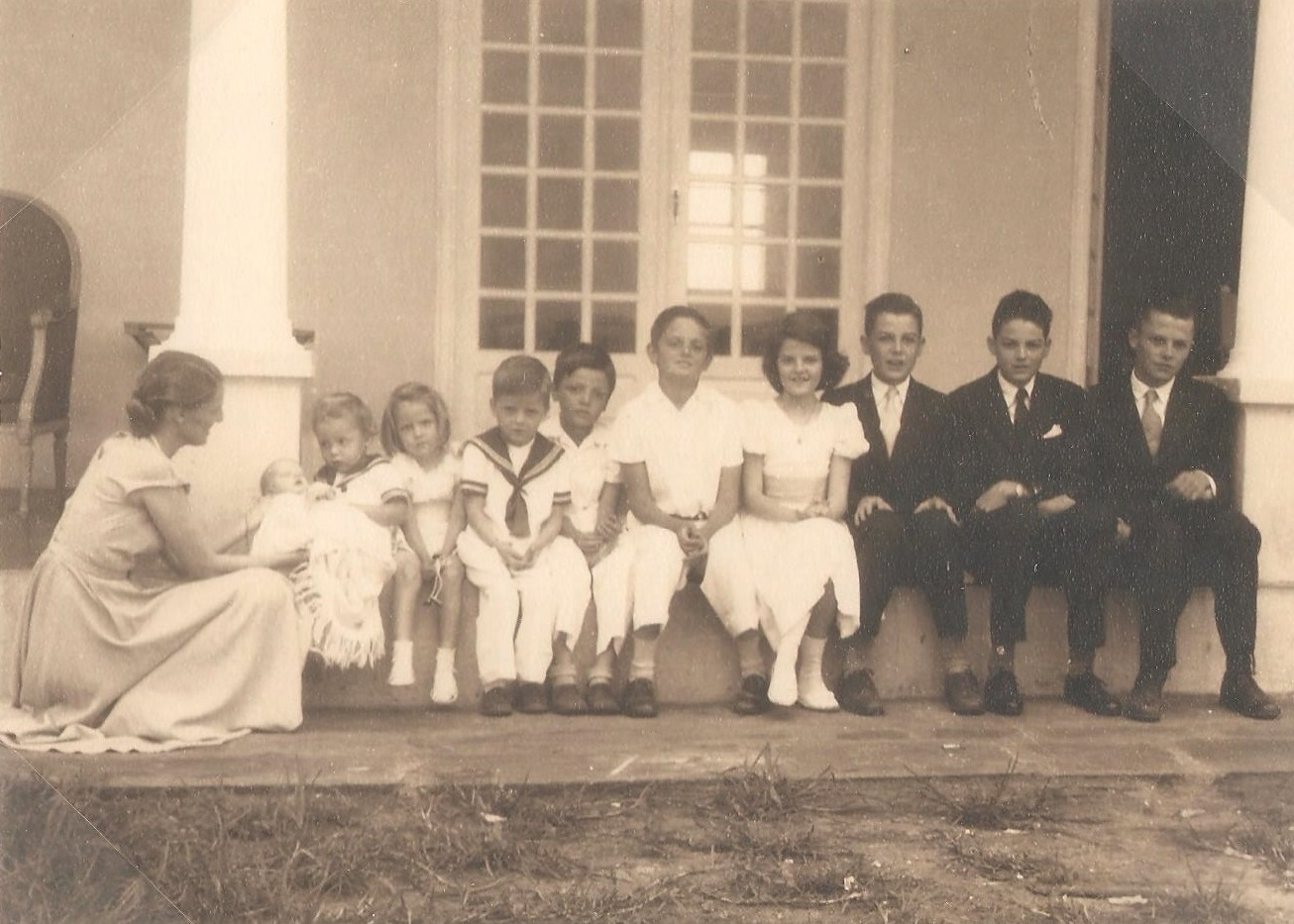
Luiz (right) with his mother and siblings, 1957

Luiz Gastão Maria José Pio was born on 6 June 1938 in Mandelieu-la-Napoule, France, as the oldest son of Pedro Henrique of Orléans-Braganza, the Vassouras great-grandson of Emperor Pedro II of Brazil, and his wife, Maria Elisabeth of Bavaria, granddaughter of King Ludwig III of Bavaria.

Prince Luiz was born after the revocation of the exile that had been imposed on the Imperial family by Brazil's first Republican government. The aftermath of World War I and World War II detained the entire family in Europe until 1945, when the Vassouras branch of the family was finally repatriated, settling first in the town of Petrópolis (Rio de Janeiro), then to Jacarezinho (Paraná).

In 1957, Prince Luiz returned to Europe to finish his studies, where he graduated in chemistry at the Ludwig-Maximilians-Universität München. Returning to Brazil in 1967, his family having already moved to Vassouras (Rio de Janeiro), Luiz became a member of the Society for the Defense of Tradition, Family and Property, a traditionalist Catholic organization which opposes socialistic land reform and supports conservative politics based on Catholic social doctrine and the principles promoted by Plinio Corrêa de Oliveira. Alongside Duarte Pio, Duke of Braganza, his Portuguese counterpart and second cousin, he opposed same-sex marital unions, as of a 2015 declaration.

== Succession ==
On 1981, he succeeded Prince Pedro Henrique as the claimant to the Brazilian throne in the Vassouras branch. According to Brazilian legitimist claims, he was de jure Emperor of Brazil ("Dom Luiz I of Brazil").

He and two of his younger brothers, Prince Bertrand and Prince Antônio, engaged in monarchist proselytism in Brazil. They played major roles during the campaign for the 1993 plebiscite, which represented the first official opportunity for a return of the monarchy to Brazil since the Proclamation of the Republic in 1889. In it, the people were asked to choose which form of government, presidential or parliamentary, and which form of state organization, republic or constitutional monarchy, Brazil should have. The monarchist cause was not successful, receiving 13.2% of the vote against 66% for the republic.

Dom Luiz resided in a house with "no luxury nor splendor" in Higienópolis, a borough of São Paulo, Brazil.

== Death ==
Prince Luiz died in São Paulo on 14 July 2022 following a month-long hospitalization. The following day, Brazilian President Jair Bolsonaro, countersigned by the Minister of Foreign Affairs, issued a decree declaring a national day of mourning in his honor.

== Honours ==
Styles of Prince Luiz of Orléans-Braganza
- Reference style: His Imperial and Royal Highness
- Spoken style: Your Imperial and Royal Highness

As Head of the House of Orléans-Braganza, Prine Luiz Gastão held the following positions:

- Grand Master and Sovereign of the Imperial Order of Christ
- Grand Master and Sovereign of the Imperial Order of Saint Benedict of Aviz
- Grand Master and Sovereign of the Imperial Order of Saint James of the Sword
- Grand Master and Sovereign of the Imperial Order of the Southern Cross
- Grand Master and Sovereign of the Imperial Order of Emperor Pedro I
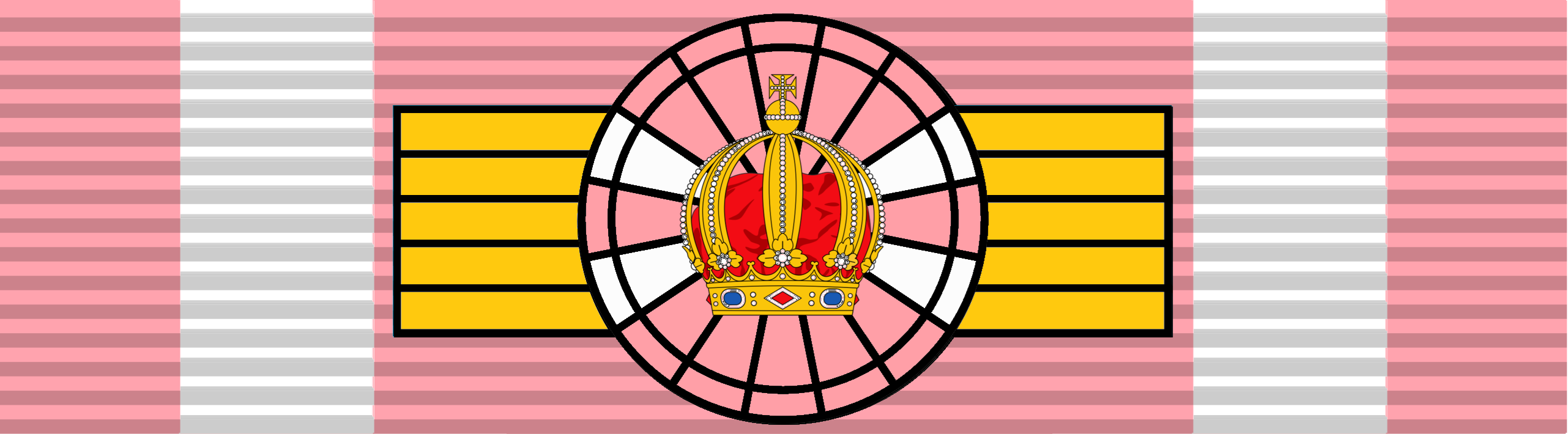
- Grand Master and Sovereign of the Imperial Order of the Rose

Prince Luiz has also been decorated with a number of other honours:

- Bailiff Grand Cross of the Sacred Military Constantinian Order of Saint George
- Grand Cross of the Order of the Immaculate Conception of Vila Viçosa
- Bailiff Grand Cross of Honour and Devotion of the Sovereign Military Order of Malta
- Knight of the Order of the Holy Sepulchre

Luiz of Orléans-Braganza House of Orléans-Braganza Cadet branch of the House of Orléans Born: 6 June 1938
Brazilian royalty
Preceded by Pedro Henrique	Head of the Imperial House of Brazil (disputed); 5 July 1981 – 15 July 2022	Succeeded by Bertrand
Titles in pretence
Preceded by Pedro Henrique	— TITULAR — Emperor of Brazil; One of two pretenders to the Brazilian throne 5 July 1981 – 15 July 2022; Reason for succession failure: Empire abolished in 1889	Succeeded by Bertrand
Preceded by Pia Maria	Prince Imperial of Brazil; 6 June 1938 – 5 July 1981	Succeeded by Bertrand
