= Luiz Philippe of Orléans-Braganza =

Brazilian writer, political scientist and politician

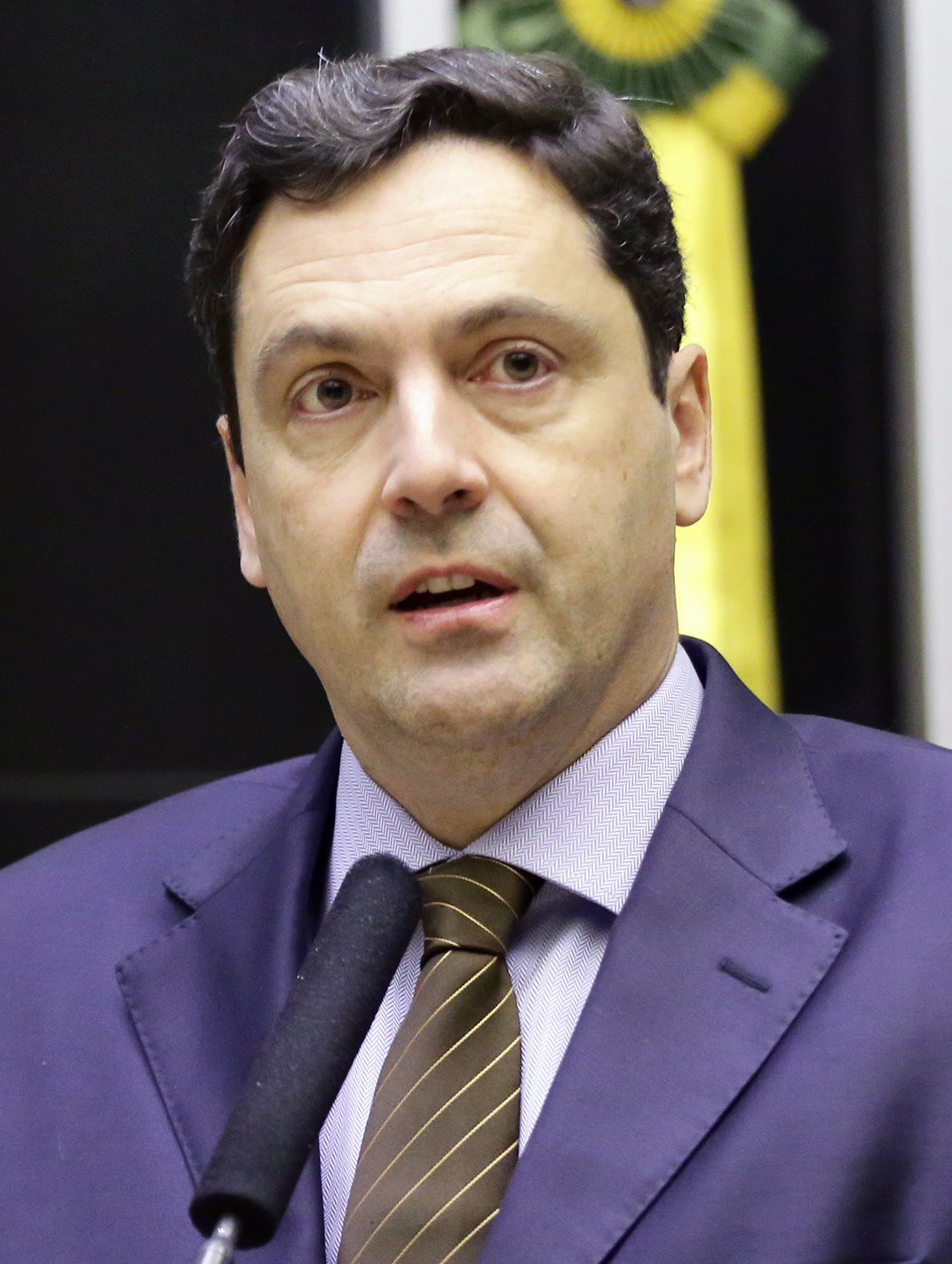
- Luiz Philippe in 2019

Member of the Chamber of Deputies
- Incumbent
- Assumed office 1 February 2019
- Constituency: São Paulo

Personal details
- Born: 3 April 1969 (age 57) Rio de Janeiro, Brazil
- Party: PL (2022–present)
- Other political affiliations: DEM (2005–2016); NOVO (2016–2018); PSL (2018–2022); UNIÃO (2022)
- Spouse: Fernanda Hara Miguita (m. 2008)
- Children: 1
- Education: Fundação Armando Alvares Penteado; Stanford University; INSEAD
- Website: lpbraganca.com.br

Luiz Philippe of Orléans-Braganza (Portuguese: Luiz Philippe de Orléans e Bragança; born 3 April 1969) is a Brazilian politician, activist, businessman, and member of the former ruling House of Orléans-Braganza. He served as a Federal Deputy for the state of São Paulo after being elected in the 2018 general election with 118,457 votes, running for the Social Liberal Party (PSL). A great-great-grandson of Emperor Pedro II, Luiz Philippe is a member of the Brazilian imperial family’s Vassouras branch. In addition to his political career, he has been active in business and public policy advocacy, particularly in areas related to economic liberalism, governance reform, and conservative political thought in Brazil.

== Biography ==
Luiz Philippe was born in Rio de Janeiro in 1969, the son of Eudes of Orléans-Braganza and Ana Maria de Moraes Barros. Luiz Philippe is the grandson of Prince Pedro Henrique of Orléans-Braganza and Princess Maria Elisabeth of Bavaria.

Luiz Philippe studied business at Fundação Armando Álvares Penteado (FAAP) and in 1993 received a master's degree in political science from Stanford University. In 1997 he received an MBA from INSEAD.

== Professional life ==
The professional trajectory of Luiz Philippe began in the United States, where he worked in companies of the financial market. Luiz Philippe was part of the financial planning of Saint-Gobain, a French multinational, between 1993 and 1996. He then worked for three years at the JP Morgan investment bank in London and the investment bank at Lazard Frères in New York City. From 2000, he returned to Brazil as director of business development for America Online (AOL) in Latin America. In 2005 he became an entrepreneur, when he founded the company IKAT do Brasil, which operates in the field of motorcycle parts distribution. In 2012 Luiz Philippe founded ZAP Tech, an incubator of means of payment for mobile platforms.

He backed the Donald Trump social media venture, Truth Social, by becoming the chief financial officer of its special-purpose acquisition company, Digital World Acquisition Corp. (DWAC)

== Political activism ==
Luiz Philippe founded the liberal movement "Acorda Brasil" (Wake up Brazil) in 2014. The following year, during the impeachment process of former President Dilma Rousseff, he presented a political reform bill to the Chamber of Deputies in Brasília. He participated in the development and intermediation with the Federal Senate, in 2016, of a Constitutional Amendment Project (PEC) that allows the non-confidence vote of a president. Luiz Philippe also participates in the Canal Terça Livre with the Caia na Real program, and travels Brazil with the lecture Redefinindo o Brasil.

He was elected Federal Deputy for the Social Liberal Party (PSL) when competing for the state of São Paulo, being the 33rd most voted in the state. He came close to competing for the Vice-Presidency of Brazil on the slate of the candidate Jair Bolsonaro, from the same party.

Among his proposals is a presidential veto, inversion of the state's public spending pyramid, and the creation of a new constitution along the lines of the Brazilian Constitution of 1824 (written at a time when the monarchy was the form of government).

== Publications ==
- Por que o Brasil é um país atrasado? – o que fazer para entrarmos de vez no século XXI (in Portuguese). Editora Novo Conceito. 2017. ISBN 9788581638676.

== Honors ==
As member of the House of Orléans-Braganza, Luiz Philippe hold the following positions:

- Knight Grand Cross of the Imperial Order of Peter I
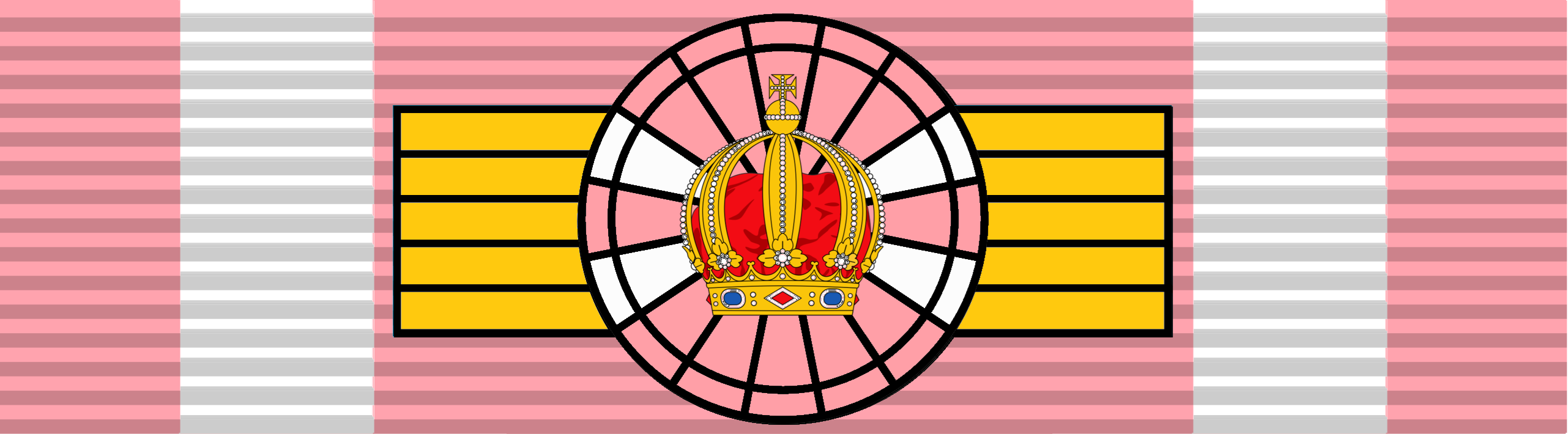
- Knight Grand Cross of the Imperial Order of the Rose

He received the following foreign honors:

- Knight Grand Cross of the Order of Saint Michael of the Wing
- Medal of Merit of the Order of the Immaculate Conception of Vila Viçosa

== Ancestry ==
Ancestors of Luiz Philippe of Orléans-Braganza

16. Prince Gaston, Count of Eu
8. Prince Luiz of Orléans-Braganza
17. Isabel, Princess Imperial of Brazil
4. Prince Pedro Henrique of Orléans-Braganza
18. Prince Alfonso, Count of Caserta
9. Princess Maria di Grazia of Bourbon-Two Sicilies
19. Princess Antonietta of Bourbon-Two Sicilies
2. Prince Eudes of Orléans-Braganza
20. Ludwig III of Bavaria
10. Prince Franz of Bavaria
21. Archduchess Maria Theresa of Austria-Este
5. Princess Maria Elisabeth of Bavaria
22. Karl Alfred, 12th Duke de Croÿ
11. Princess Isabella Antonie of Croÿ
23. Princess Ludmilla d'Arenberg
1. Luiz Philippe of Orléans-Braganza
6. Luíz de Moraes e Barros
3. Ana Maria de Moraes Barros
7. Maria do Carmo Cerqueira César
