= Princess Maria Elisabeth of Bavaria =

Princess Maria Elisabeth
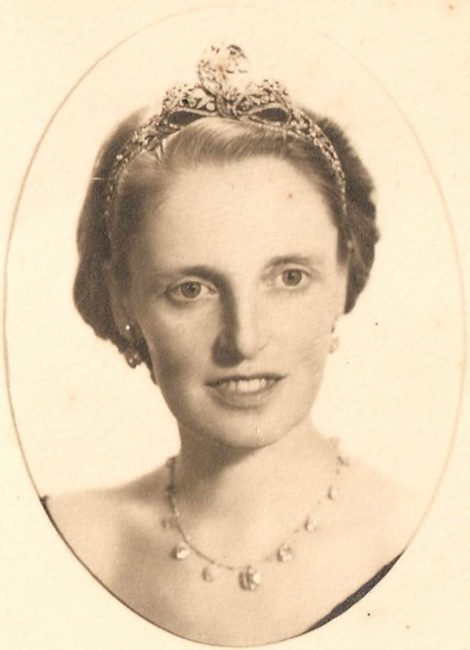

Consort of the Head of the Imperial House of Brazil (disputed)
- Tenure: 19 August 1937 - 5 July 1981
- Born: 14 September 1914; Munich, Kingdom of Bavaria
- Died: 13 May 2011 (aged 96); Rio de Janeiro, Brazil
- Burial: 14 May 2011; Imperial Family Mausoleum, Vassouras, Brazil
- Spouse: Prince Pedro Henrique of Brazil (m. 1937; died 1981)
- Issue Detail: Luiz of Orléans-Braganza; Eudes of Orléans-Braganza; Bertrand of Orléans-Braganza; Isabel of Orléans-Braganza; Pedro of Orléans-Braganza; Maria Carolina of Orléans-Braganza; Fernando of Orléans-Braganza; Antônio of Orléans-Braganza; Eleonora of Orléans-Braganza; Francisco of Orléans-Braganza; Alberto of Orléans-Braganza; Maria Teresa of Orléans-Braganza; Maria Gabriela of Orléans-Braganza
Names
- Maria Elisabeth Franziska Josepha Therese
- House: Wittelsbach (by birth); Orléans-Braganza (by marriage)
- Father: Prince Franz of Bavaria
- Mother: Princess Isabella Antonie of Croÿ

Princess Maria Elisabeth of Bavaria (German: Prinzessin Maria Elisabeth Franziska Josepha Therese von Bayern; 9 September 1914 – 13 May 2011) was a German princess of the House of Wittelsbach and a member of the Brazilian imperial family by marriage. She was a granddaughter of Ludwig III of Bavaria, the last reigning King of Bavaria. In 1937, she married Prince Pedro Henrique of Orléans-Braganza, head of the Vassouras branch of the House of Orléans-Braganza and claimant to the defunct Brazilian throne. As his wife, Maria Elisabeth became a prominent figure within Brazilian monarchist circles and was often referred to as the “empress-mother”, reflecting her role as matriarch of the branch that continues to assert claims to the former Empire of Brazil. She was the mother of Prince Luiz Gastão and Prince Bertrand, both of whom successively served as heads of the Vassouras branch of the Imperial House of Brazil, with Bertrand remaining an active claimant in the 21st century.

== Early life ==
Princess Maria Elisabeth of Bavaria was born at Nymphenburg Palace, Munich, Kingdom of Bavaria, the second child and first daughter of Prince Franz of Bavaria (1875–1957), (son of Ludwig III of Bavaria and Archduchess Maria Theresa of Austria-Este) and his wife, Princess Isabella Antonie of Croÿ (1890–1982), (daughter of Karl Alfred, Duke of Croÿ and Princess Ludmilla of Arenberg).

Princess Maria Elisabeth was born at the beginning of First World War; most of her relatives fought during the war, even her father. Her childhood and youth were very troubled because of the regimes that were established in Germany after the war.

Until coming of age the princess lived in Sárvár Castle, in Hungary, which was owned by her grandmother, Queen Maria Teresa, a born Archduchess of Austria, Princess of Hungary and of Modena, among others. The Bavarian Royal Family returned to Bavaria in the 1930s. The republican government was forced to return a substantial part of goods and castles that had been confiscated in 1918 after the revolution.

The times in Germany between the wars (1918–1938) were difficult, due to the Great Depression of 1929 and the rise of the Nazis, and Adolf Hitler in the German government. The uncle of the princess, Rupprecht (1869–1955), head of the Royal House of Bavaria, declared himself an enemy of Hitler. This fact had a huge impact on the Royal Family; they were forced to flee to Italy. The second wife of Prince Rupprecht, Princess Antonia of Luxembourg (1899–1955), and her children, however, were captured by the Nazis, while Rupprecht, still in Italy, evaded arrest. They were imprisoned at Sachsenhausen. Although liberated that very same month, the imprisonment greatly impaired Antonia's health, and she died nine years later, at Lenzerheide, Switzerland.

Princess Maria Elisabeth received education from her parents, as well as schooling in the art of painting. The Princess specialized in porcelain painting, a traditional art of Bavaria.

== Marriage and departure to Brazil ==
On 19 August 1937 Princess Maria Elisabeth married Pedro Henrique of Orléans-Braganza, head of one of the branches of the Imperial House of Brazil. The wedding took place in the chapel of Nymphenburg Palace.

The couple lived first in France; although they made numerous attempts to immigrate to Brazil, they were prevented by World War II. It was not until 1945 that the family was able to move. First, they settled in the Palace of Grão-Pará, in Petrópolis, Rio de Janeiro, and later in a house of the neighborhood of Retiro. In 1951, Pedro Henrique acquired the Fazenda Santa Maria, in Jacarezinho, Paraná, where the family lived until 1964. In 1965, the family moved to Vassouras, within the state of Rio de Janeiro.

=== Widowhood ===
In 1981, Pedro Henrique died at Vassouras and his eldest son became the Head of the Vassouras branch of the Imperial House of Brazil. Maria Elisabeth's life was divided between Santa Maria and her daughter Isabel's apartment in the district of Lagoa, Rio de Janeiro. She frequently visited Bavaria and Belgium, where her other daughters resided.

In 2004, a Mass honoring her 90th birthday was celebrated by the abbot emeritus of St. Benedict of Rio de Janeiro, Jose Palmeiro Mendes, and co-celebrated by priests Sérgio Costa Couto, judge of the Ecclesiastical Tribunal of the Archdiocese of Rio de Janeiro and chaplain of the Glory of the Outeiro, and Jorge Luis Pereira da Silva at the Church of Imperial Brotherhood of Nossa Senhora da Glória do Outeiro, in Rio de Janeiro. It was attended by all of her children and numerous grandchildren, making the event noteworthy enough to be reported on by Brazilian media.

=== Children and descendants ===
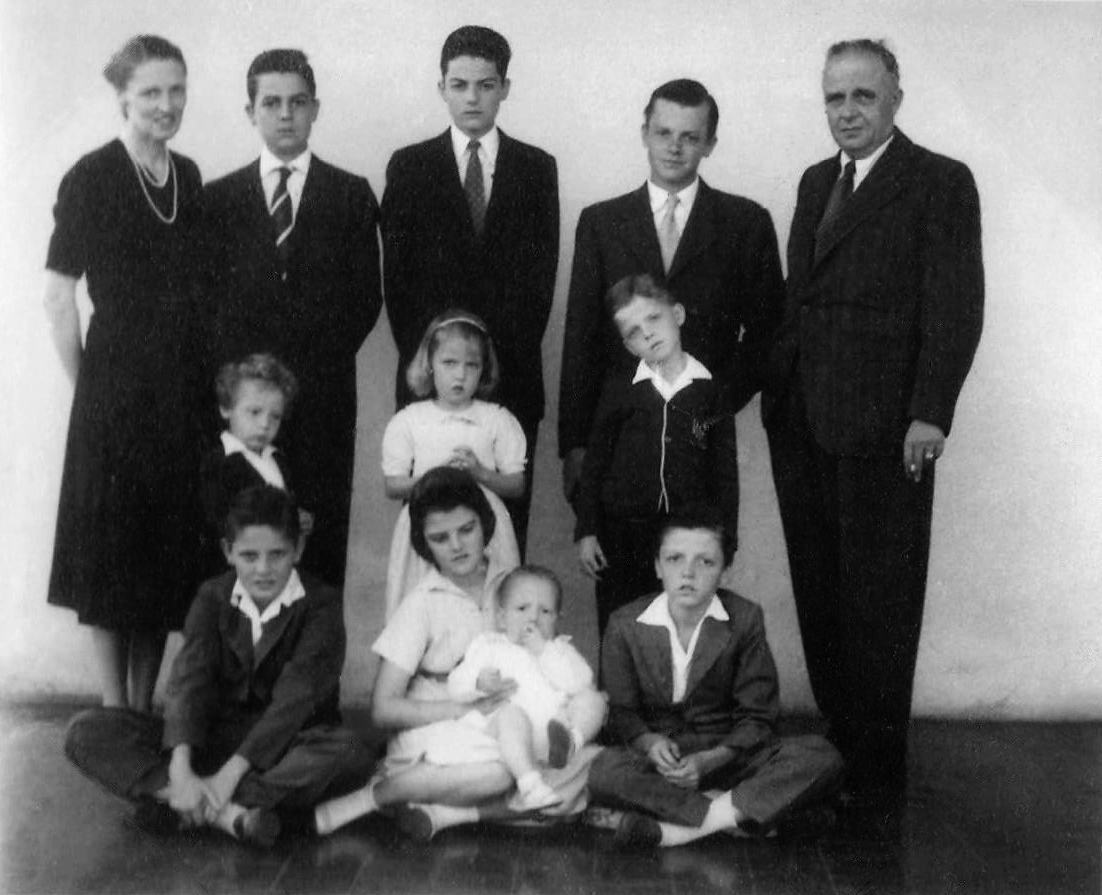
Maria Elisabeth and Pedro Henrique with their family.

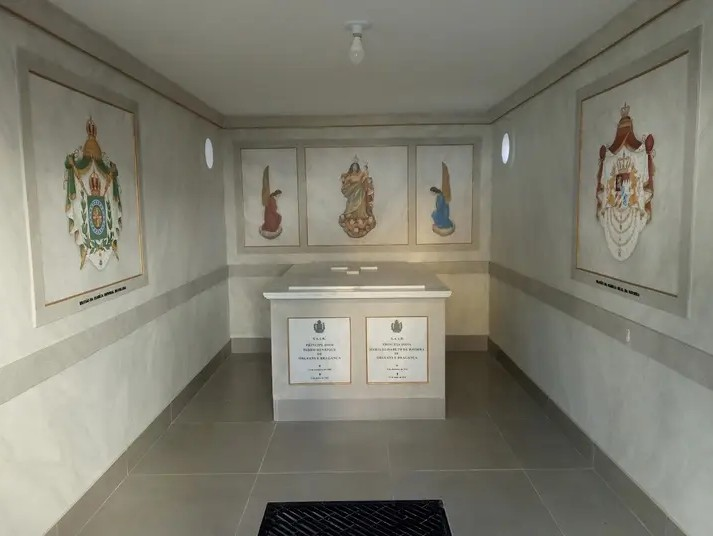
Tomb of Maria Elisabeth and Pedro Henrique in the Imperial Family Mausoleum in Vassouras, Brazil

- Prince Luiz of Orléans-Braganza (6 June 1938 in Mandelieu-la-Napoule – 15 July 2022 in São Paulo). Unmarried and without issue.
- Prince Eudes of Orléans-Braganza (8 June 1939 in Mandelieu-la-Napoule – 13 August 2020 in Rio de Janeiro), renounced Imperial succession rights for himself and his descendants on 3 June 1966 and married, firstly, on 14 May 1967 in São Paulo, Ana Maria de Cerqueira César Moraes de Barros (born 20 November 1945 in São Paulo), from whom he was divorced in 1976, having had two children, including Luiz Philippe of Orléans-Braganza. He remarried on 26 March 1976 in Rio de Janeiro, Mercedes Willemsens Neves da Rocha (born 26 January 1955 in Petrópolis), with whom he had four children.
- Prince Bertrand of Orléans-Braganza (born 2 February 1941 in Mandelieu-la-Napoule). Unmarried and without issue.
- Isabel Maria Josefa Henriqueta Francisca of Orléans-Braganza (4 April 1944 in La Bourboule – 5 November 2017 in Rio de Janeiro).
- Pedro de Alcântara Henrique Maria Miguel Gabriel Rafael Gonzaga of Orléans-Braganza (born 1 December 1945 in Petrópolis), renounced Imperial succession rights for himself and his descendants on 28 December 1972 and married on 4 July 1974 in Rio de Janeiro, Maria de Fátima Baptista de Oliveira Rocha (born 14 July 1952 in Rio de Janeiro), with whom he had five children.
- Maria Caroline of Orléans-Braganza (28 September 1946 in Petrópolis — 28 September 1946 in Petrópolis). Maria Caroline lived for only 10 hours, dying on the same day of her birth due to prematurity and respiratory failure.
- Fernando Diniz Maria José Miguel Gabriel Rafael Gonzaga of Orléans-Braganza (born 2 February 1948 in Petrópolis), renounced Imperial succession rights for himself and his descendants on 24 February 1975 and married 19 March 1975 in Rio de Janeiro, Maria de Graça de Siqueira Carvalho Baere de Araújo (born 27 June 1952 in Rio de Janeiro), with whom he had three daughters.
- Prince Antônio of Orléans-Braganza (24 June 1950 in Rio de Janeiro – 8 November 2024 in Rio de Janeiro), married on 25 September 1981 in Belœil, Princess Christine de Ligne (born 11 August 1955 in Belœil), daughter of Antoine, 13th Prince of Ligne, and Princess Alix of Luxembourg. They had four children.
- Princess Eleonora Maria Josefa Rosa Filipa Miguela Gabriela Rafaela Gonzaga of Orléans-Braganza (born 20 May 1953 in Jacarezinho), married on 10 March 1981 in Rio de Janeiro, Michel, 14th Prince of Ligne (born 26 May 1951 in Belœil), son of Antoine, 13th Prince of Ligne, and Princess Alix of Luxembourg. They have two children.
- Francisco Maria José Rasso Miguel Gabriel Rafael Gonzaga of Orléans-Braganza (born 6 April 1955 in Jacarezinho), renounced Imperial succession rights for himself and his descendants on 11 December 1980 and married on 28 December 1980 in Rio de Janeiro, Cláudia Regina Lisboa Martins Godinho (born 11 July 1954 in Rio de Janeiro), with whom he had three daughters.
- Alberto Maria José João Miguel Gabriel Rafael Gonzaga of Orléans-Braganza (born 23 June 1957 in Jundiaí do Sul), renounced Imperial succession rights for himself and his descendants on 22 December 1982 and married on 11 January 1983 in Rio de Janeiro, Maritza Bulcão Ribas Bockel (born 29 April 1961 in Rio de Janeiro), with whom he had four children.
- Maria Teresa Aldegunda Luiza Josefa Micaela Gabriela Rafaela Gonzaga of Orléans-Braganza (born 14 July 1959 in Jundiaí do Sul), renounced Imperial succession rights for herself and her descendants on 30 October 1995 and married on 4 November 1995 in Rio de Janeiro, Johannes Hessel de Jong (born 5 March 1954 in Joure, Friesland, the Netherlands), with whom she had two children.
- Maria Gabriela Dorotéa Isabel Josefa Micaela Gabriela Rafaela Gonzaga of Orléans-Braganza (born 14 July 1959 in Jundiaí do Sul), renounced Imperial succession rights for herself and her descendants on 18 December 2003 and married in Rio de Janeiro on 20 December 2003 (and divorced in 2005), Theodore Senna de Hungria da Silva Machado (born 12 July 1954 in Petrópolis). They had no issue.

== Honors ==
- House of Wittelsbach – Order of Saint Elizabeth
- House of Wittelsbach – Order of Theresa
- House of Bourbon-Two Sicilies – Grand Cross of the Sacred Military Constantinian Order of Saint George
- Sovereign Military Order of Malta – Dame of Justice

== Ancestry ==
Ancestors of Princess Maria Elisabeth of Bavaria

8. Luitpold, Prince Regent of Bavaria
4. Ludwig III of Bavaria
9. Archduchess Auguste Ferdinande of Austria
2. Prince Franz of Bavaria
10. Archduke Ferdinand Karl Viktor of Austria-Este
5. Archduchess Maria Theresa of Austria-Este
11. Archduchess Elisabeth Franziska of Austria
1. Princess Maria Elisabeth of Bavaria
12. Rudolf, 11th Duke of Croÿ
6. Karl Alfred, 12th Duke of Croÿ
13. Princess Natalie of Ligne
3. Princess Isabella Antonie of Croÿ
14. Engelbert, 8th Duke of Arenberg
7. Princess Ludmilla of Arenberg
15. Princess Éléonore of Arenberg

== Sources ==
- Montgomery-Massingberd, Hugh, ed. (1977). Burke's Royal Families of the World, Volume 1: Europe & Latin America. London: Burke's Peerage. ISBN 0-85011-023-8.
- "Haus Brasilien". Genealogisches Handbuch des Adels, Fürstliche Häuser XIV (in German). Limburg an der Lahn: C.A. Starke Verlag. 1991. ISBN 3-7980-0700-4.
- "Imperial House of Brazil" (in Portuguese).
- The Royal House of Stuart, London, 1969, 1971, 1976, Addington, A. C., Reference: page 78.
