= Pedro Henrique of Orléans-Braganza =

Head of the Imperial House of Brazil (disputed)

Pedro Henrique
- Pedro Henrique in 1951

Head of the Imperial House of Brazil (disputed)
- Tenure: 14 November 1921 – 5 July 1981
- Predecessor: Isabel, Princess Imperial of Brazil
- Successor: Luiz of Orléans-Braganza
- Born: 13 September 1909; Boulogne-Billancourt, French Third Republic
- Died: 5 July 1981 (aged 71); Vassouras, Brazil
- Burial: Imperial Family Mausoleum, Vassouras, Brazil
- Spouse: Princess Maria Elisabeth of Bavaria (m. 1937)
- Issue Detail: Luiz of Orléans-Braganza; Eudes of Orléans-Braganza; Bertrand of Orléans-Braganza; Isabel of Orléans-Braganza; Pedro of Orléans-Braganza; Maria Carolina of Orléans-Braganza; Fernando of Orléans-Braganza; Antônio of Orléans-Braganza; Eleonora of Orléans-Braganza; Francisco of Orléans-Braganza; Alberto of Orléans-Braganza; Maria Teresa of Orléans-Braganza; Maria Gabriela of Orléans-Braganza
- House: Orléans-Braganza
- Father: Prince Luís of Orléans-Braganza
- Mother: Princess Maria di Grazia of Bourbon-Two Sicilies

Prince Pedro Henrique of Orléans-Braganza (13 September 1909 – 5 July 1981), nicknamed The Expected Prince (Portuguese: O Príncipe Esperado) was the eldest son of Prince Luís of Orléans-Braganza and Princess Maria di Grazia of Bourbon-Two Sicilies, and head of the Vassouras branch of the Imperial House of Brazil from 1921 until his death in 1981. Pedro succeeded his grandmother, Princess Isabel of Brazil, as head of the family after her death.

== Early life in Europe ==
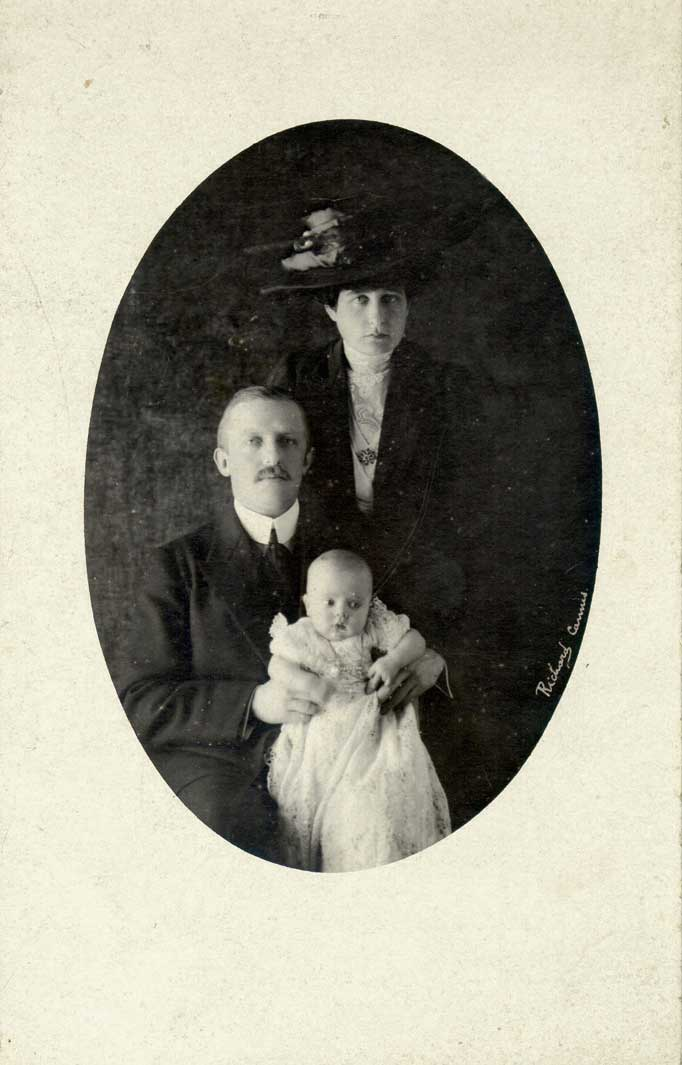
An unbreeched Pedro Henrique with his parents, Prince Luís and Princess Maria di Grazia, c. 1909–1910

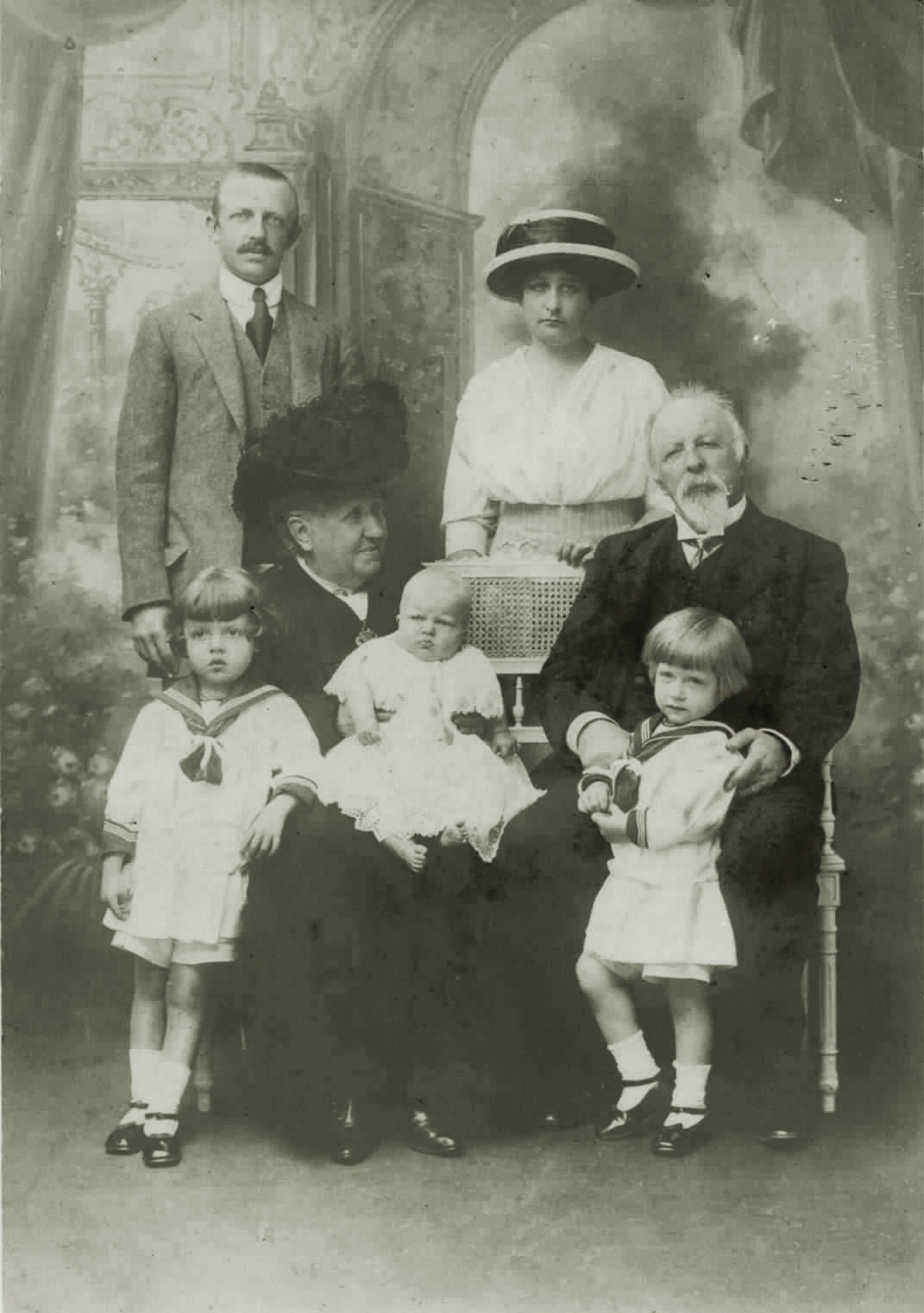
Pedro Henrique (left, foreground) with his parents, grandparents, and siblings during their exile, 1913

He was born in 1909 in France at Boulogne-sur-Seine during the exile of the Brazilian imperial family, which had been deposed in 1889. His father, Prince Luiz of Orléans-Braganza, was the second son of the heir to the defunct Brazilian throne, the Princess Imperial Isabel, and Prince Gaston, Count of Eu. His mother was Princess Maria Pia of Bourbon-Two Sicilies. The year before Pedro Henrique's birth, she recognized his father, Luiz, as the heir to the succession when Luiz's elder brother, Pedro de Alcântara, Prince of Grão-Pará, renounced his claim to the throne on behalf of himself and his descendants.

Thus, at birth Prince Pedro Henrique became claimant to the title of Prince of Grão-Pará, according to Article 105 of the defunct Constitution of 1824. He was baptized in the chapel of the Château d'Eu with the waters of the fountain taken from Largo da Carioca, in Rio de Janeiro. His godparents were his paternal grandmother, Princess Isabel of Brazil, and maternal grandfather Prince Alfonso, Count of Caserta, Head of the royal house of the Two Sicilies. He and his family lived between the Eu castle and a palace in Boulogne-sur-Seine, both belonging to the Imperial Family. He was raised primarily by his paternal grandmother, and numerous preceptors educated him as future emperor of Brazil.

In 1920, his father died in Cannes of injuries acquired in the trenches of the First World War. In the same year Brazil's banishment of the Orléans-Braganzas was revoked by the then President Epitácio Pessoa. Pedro Henrique accompanied Count d'Eu when he led part of the Imperial Family back to Brazil, without the aged and infirm Princess Isabel. Grandfather and grandson soon returned to Europe.

Upon the death of his father in 1920 Pedro Henrique became claimant to the title of Prince Imperial, but on 14 November 1921 Princess Isabel died at the Castle d'Eu. So, aged 12 Prince Pedro Henrique became the head of the imperial family. Had he became emperor, his imperial name would be Dom Pedro III.

He continued living in France with his mother, Princess Maria Pia, where she thought he could get a better education with his siblings Luiz Gastão and Pia Maria. Pedro Henrique was educated at the École des Sciences Politiques in Paris. He was described by his grandmother as "a very intelligent child".

In 1925, at the age of 16, the Brazilian government ruled against his request to serve in the military.

== Life in Brazil ==
Pedro de Alcântara died in 1940.

Prince Pedro Henrique was only able to return to Brazil in 1945, when the Second World War ended. He settled first in Petrópolis, Rio de Janeiro, in the palace of the Grão-Pará, and then in the neighborhood of Retiro, also in Petrópolis. His cousin, Prince Pedro Gastão of Orléans-Braganza, the eldest son of Pedro de Alcântara, Prince of Grão-Pará, challenged Pedro Henrique's claim to the succession in 1946, on the basis that his father's renunciation had no legal force.

In 1951, D. Pedro Henrique bought a farm, Fazenda Santa Maria, in the town of Jacarezinho, interior of Paraná. In 1965, he returned to Rio de Janeiro, settling in Vassouras, an important city in the days of Empire for coffee production. Pedro Henrique resided at a site called Santa Maria until the end of his life. He was active in the monarchist movement.

On his death in 1981, Pedro Henrique's claim to the throne passed to his eldest son, Luiz.

== Marriage and children ==
Styles of Prince Pedro Henrique
- Reference style: His Imperial and Royal Highness
- Spoken style: Your Imperial and Royal Highness

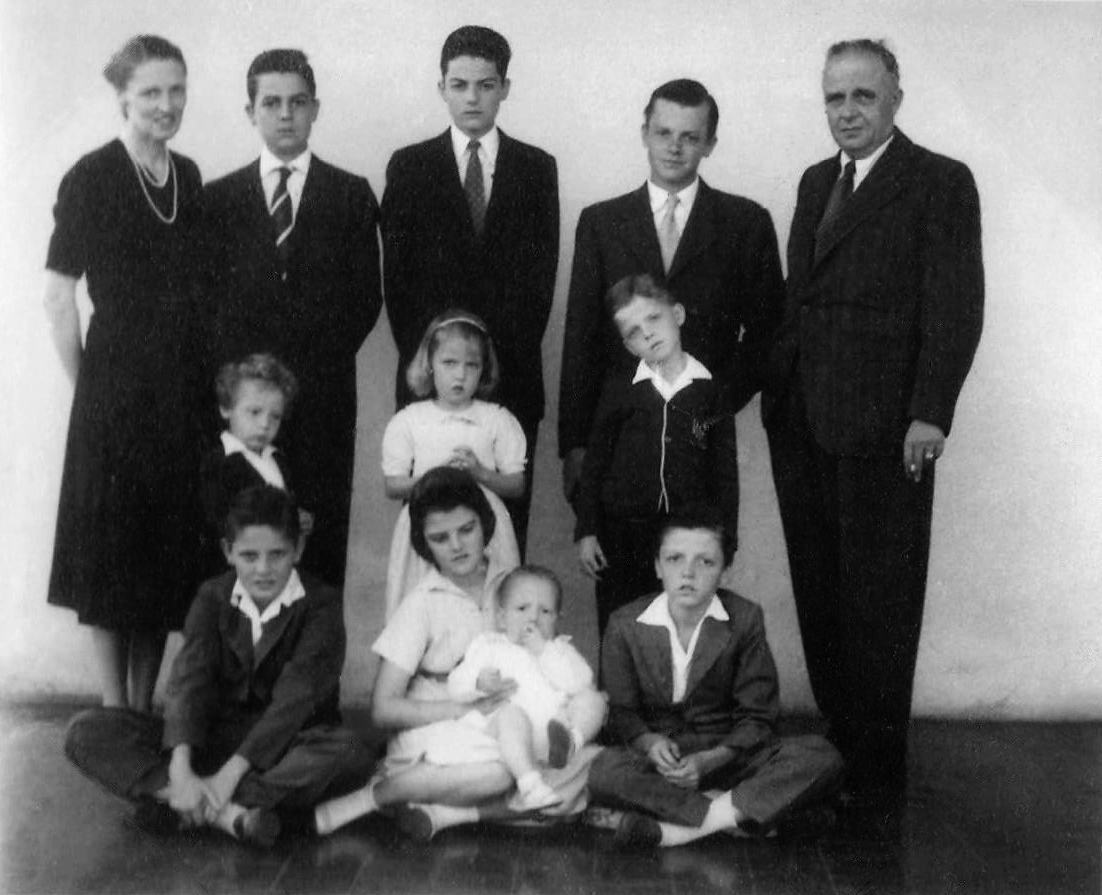
Pedro Henrique and his family (undated).

Pedro Henrique with Maria Elisabeth at the public exhibition of the coffin of his great-great-grandfather, Emperor Pedro I of Brazil, at the Palace of São Cristóvão, Rio de Janeiro, 1972

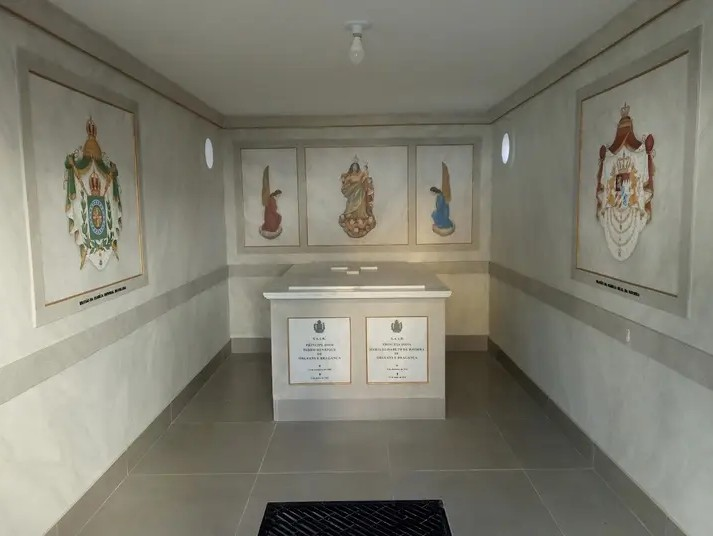
Tomb of Pedro Henrique and Maria Elisabeth in the Imperial Family Mausoleum in Vassouras, Brazil

Pedro Henrique married Princess Maria Elisabeth of Bavaria at Nymphenburg Palace, Bavaria, on 19 August 1937. They had thirteen children:

1. Prince Luiz of Orléans-Braganza (6 June 1938 in Mandelieu-la-Napoule – 15 July 2022 in São Paulo). Unmarried and without issue.
2. Prince Eudes of Orléans-Braganza (8 June 1939 in Mandelieu-la-Napoule – 13 August 2020 in Rio de Janeiro), renounced Imperial succession rights for himself and his descendants on 3 June 1966 and married, firstly, on 14 May 1967 in São Paulo, Ana Maria de Cerqueira César Moraes de Barros (born 20 November 1945 in São Paulo), from whom he was divorced in 1976, having had two children, including Luiz Philippe of Orléans-Braganza. He remarried on 26 March 1976 in Rio de Janeiro, Mercedes Willemsens Neves da Rocha (born 26 January 1955 in Petrópolis), with whom he had four children.
3. Prince Bertrand of Orléans-Braganza (born 2 February 1941 in Mandelieu-la-Napoule). Unmarried and without issue.
4. Isabel Maria Josefa Henriqueta Francisca of Orléans-Braganza (4 April 1944 in La Bourboule – 5 November 2017 in Rio de Janeiro).
5. Pedro de Alcântara Henrique Maria Miguel Gabriel Rafael Gonzaga of Orléans-Braganza (born 1 December 1945 in Petrópolis), renounced Imperial succession rights for himself and his descendants on 28 December 1972 and married on 4 July 1974 in Rio de Janeiro, Maria de Fátima Baptista de Oliveira Rocha (born 14 July 1952 in Rio de Janeiro), with whom he had five children.
6. Maria Caroline of Orléans-Braganza (28 September 1946 in Petrópolis — 28 September 1946 in Petrópolis). Maria Caroline lived for only 10 hours, dying on the same day of her birth due to prematurity and respiratory failure.
7. Fernando Diniz Maria José Miguel Gabriel Rafael Gonzaga of Orléans-Braganza (born 2 February 1948 in Petrópolis), renounced Imperial succession rights for himself and his descendants on 24 February 1975 and married 19 March 1975 in Rio de Janeiro, Maria de Graça de Siqueira Carvalho Baere de Araújo (born 27 June 1952 in Rio de Janeiro), with whom he had three daughters.
8. Prince Antônio of Orléans-Braganza (24 June 1950 in Rio de Janeiro – 8 November 2024 in Rio de Janeiro), married on 25 September 1981 in Belœil, Princess Christine de Ligne (born 11 August 1955 in Belœil), daughter of Antoine, 13th Prince of Ligne, and Princess Alix of Luxembourg. They had four children.
9. Princess Eleonora Maria Josefa Rosa Filipa Miguela Gabriela Rafaela Gonzaga of Orléans-Braganza (born 20 May 1953 in Jacarezinho), married on 10 March 1981 in Rio de Janeiro, Michel, 14th Prince of Ligne (born 26 May 1951 in Belœil), son of Antoine, 13th Prince of Ligne, and Princess Alix of Luxembourg. They have two children.
10. Francisco Maria José Rasso Miguel Gabriel Rafael Gonzaga of Orléans-Braganza (born 6 April 1955 in Jacarezinho), renounced Imperial succession rights for himself and his descendants on 11 December 1980 and married on 28 December 1980 in Rio de Janeiro, Cláudia Regina Lisboa Martins Godinho (born 11 July 1954 in Rio de Janeiro), with whom he had three daughters.
11. Alberto Maria José João Miguel Gabriel Rafael Gonzaga of Orléans-Braganza (born 23 June 1957 in Jundiaí do Sul), renounced Imperial succession rights for himself and his descendants on 22 December 1982 and married on 11 January 1983 in Rio de Janeiro, Maritza Bulcão Ribas Bockel (born 29 April 1961 in Rio de Janeiro), with whom he had four children.
12. Maria Teresa Aldegunda Luiza Josefa Micaela Gabriela Rafaela Gonzaga of Orléans-Braganza (born 14 July 1959 in Jundiaí do Sul), renounced Imperial succession rights for herself and her descendants on 30 October 1995 and married on 4 November 1995 in Rio de Janeiro, Johannes Hessel de Jong (born 5 March 1954 in Joure, Friesland, the Netherlands), with whom she had two children.
13. Maria Gabriela Dorotéa Isabel Josefa Micaela Gabriela Rafaela Gonzaga of Orléans-Braganza (born 14 July 1959 in Jundiaí do Sul), renounced Imperial succession rights for herself and her descendants on 18 December 2003 and married in Rio de Janeiro on 20 December 2003 (and divorced in 2005), Theodore Senna de Hungria da Silva Machado (born 12 July 1954 in Petrópolis). They had no issue.

== Honors ==
- Bailiff Knight Grand Cross of Justice with Collar of the Sacred Military Constantinian Order of Saint George.

== Ancestry ==
Ancestors of Pedro Henrique of Orléans-Braganza

8. Prince Louis, Duke of Nemours
4. Prince Gaston, Count of Eu
9. Princess Victoria of Saxe-Coburg and Gotha
2. Prince Luiz of Orléans-Braganza
10. Pedro II of Brazil
5. Isabel, Princess Imperial of Brazil
11. Princess Teresa Cristina of the Two Sicilies
1. Prince Pedro Henrique of Orléans-Braganza
12. Ferdinand II of the Two Sicilies
6. Prince Alfonso, Count of Caserta
13. Archduchess Maria Theresa of Austria
3. Princess Maria di Grazia of Bourbon-Two Sicilies
14. Prince Francis, Count of Trapani
7. Princess Maria Antonietta of Bourbon-Two Sicilies
15. Archduchess Maria Isabella of Austria
