= Rafael Fragoso =

Brazilian businessman and sportsman (died 2020)

Rafael Fragoso Pires
- Born: 1957–1958; Brazil
- Died: 17 May 2020; Rio de Janeiro, Brazil
- Other name: Fafa
- Occupations: Businessman, jockey
- Known for: Professional jockey; Brazilian champion in horse racing
- Spouse: Márcia Müller
- Children: 1

Rafael Fragoso Pires (1957-8 – Rio de Janeiro, 17 May 2020) better known as Fafa, was a Brazilian businessman and sportsman. He was a professional jockey, and was repeatedly Brazilian champion in horse racing.

== Biography ==
Rafael Fragoso Pires was the son of ex-tycoon José Fragoso Pires, whose empire went into debt in the 1990s. The family owned the failed Oceanic and Amazonian fleets and the extinct Banco Vega.

Rafael liked horses and horse racing, and was Brazilian champion several times, officially representing Brazil in international competitions.

In 2015, he closed his Fragoso accessories and footwear store in Ipanema, south of Rio de Janeiro, which he co-owned with partners Felipe Gomes and Bernardo Gomes.

In March 2020, he was diagnosed with COVID-19, after attending his daughter's engagement party on the 7th of the same month. According to the magazine Época, among the guests there were people who had returned from Italy, the United States and Belgium.

In May 2020, he died of COVID-19, at the age of 62, after being hospitalized for two months, at the State Institute of the Brain (IEC). He had been undergoing treatment for leukemia before being infected by covid. He left his wife, architect and decorator Márcia Müller, and had a daughter from his relationship with Bettina Haegler, Alessandra Haegler Fragoso Pires who was preparing to marry Pedro de Orléans e Bragança, son of Prince Dom Alberto de Orléans e Bragança and grandson of Prince Dom Pedro Henrique of Orléans-Braganza.
