= Daniel Soranz =

Brazilian politician (born 1979)

- Soranz in 2026

Member of the Chamber of Deputies
- Incumbent
- Assumed office 1 February 2023
- Constituency: Rio de Janeiro

Personal details
- Born: Daniel Ricardo Soranz Pinto; 16 February 1979 (age 47) Vassouras, Rio de Janeiro, Brazil
- Party: PSD (since 2022)
- Other political affiliations: PTB (2018–2020); PSL (2020); DEM (2020–2022); UNIÃO (2022)

Daniel Ricardo Soranz Pinto (born 16 February 1979) is a Brazilian politician serving as a member of the Chamber of Deputies since 2023. He has served as secretary of health of Rio de Janeiro since 2023, having previously served from 2014 to 2016 and from 2021 to 2022.
