= Luís of Brazil =

Luís of Brazil may refer to:

- Prince Luiz of Orléans-Braganza (1878–1920), Prince of Brazil
- Prince Luiz of Orléans-Braganza (1938–2022), pretender to the throne of Brazil
