= Head of the Imperial House of Brazil =

The Head of the Brazilian Imperial House (Portuguese: Chefe da Casa Imperial do Brasil) is a title used by the leader of the Brazilian imperial family, currently the House of Orléans-Braganza, a descendant branch of the House of Braganza. The title of the head of the imperial house is "Emperor de jure". The current head of the imperial house is disputed between the Direct-Line descendant Dom Pedro Borbon of Orléans-Braganza and the Cadet-Line descendant Dom Prince Bertrand of Orléans-Braganza.

After the death of the last emperor of Brazil, Pedro II, in 1891, in the wake of the proclamation of the Brazilian republic on November 15, 1889, and the revocation of all titles of nobility then existing, starting with the Brazilian Constitution of 1891, it serves to indicate the heir presumptive to the extinct imperial throne of Brazil. The Brazilian monarchists affirm that, maintaining the logic established by the Brazilian Constitution of 1824, this title would respect the line of sovereignty of the jus sanguinis, being granted to the oldest male direct descendant of Emperor Pedro I of Brazil and, failing that, to the female one. If the holder of the title were a descendant of the Brazilian imperial family, as was Princess Isabel of Braganza, who married Prince Gaston of Orléans in 1864, the title would never be transmitted to her husband, this being the Head Consort of the Brazilian Imperial House.

In the same way that happened with the Brazilian emperors when they were elevated to the throne, the first-born of the Head of the Brazilian Imperial House would receive the extinct title of Prince Imperial of Brazil, and his son the title of Prince of Grão-Pará.

Since July 2022, the title has been formally used in official acts of the Brazilian State. On 15 July 2022, the President of Brazil, Jair Bolsonaro, declared one day of official national mourning for the death of Dom Luiz of Orléans-Braganza, expressly designated in Decree No. 11,134 as "Chefe da Casa Imperial do Brasil" (Head of the Imperial House of Brazil). On the following day, the Ministry of Foreign Affairs issued Press Release No. 114, referring to the deceased as "Sua Alteza Imperial e Real Dom Luiz de Orleans e Bragança, Chefe da Casa Imperial brasileira" and officially recognising his brother Dom Bertrand as his successor in the headship, to whom would fall "the mission of representing the descendants of the founder of Brazil in this year of the Bicentenary of Independence".

== Dynastic question 1908 ==
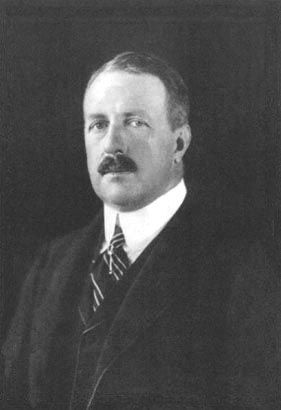
Pedro de Alcântara, Prince of Grão-Pará renounced his rights of succession to the Brazilian throne in favor of his young brother.

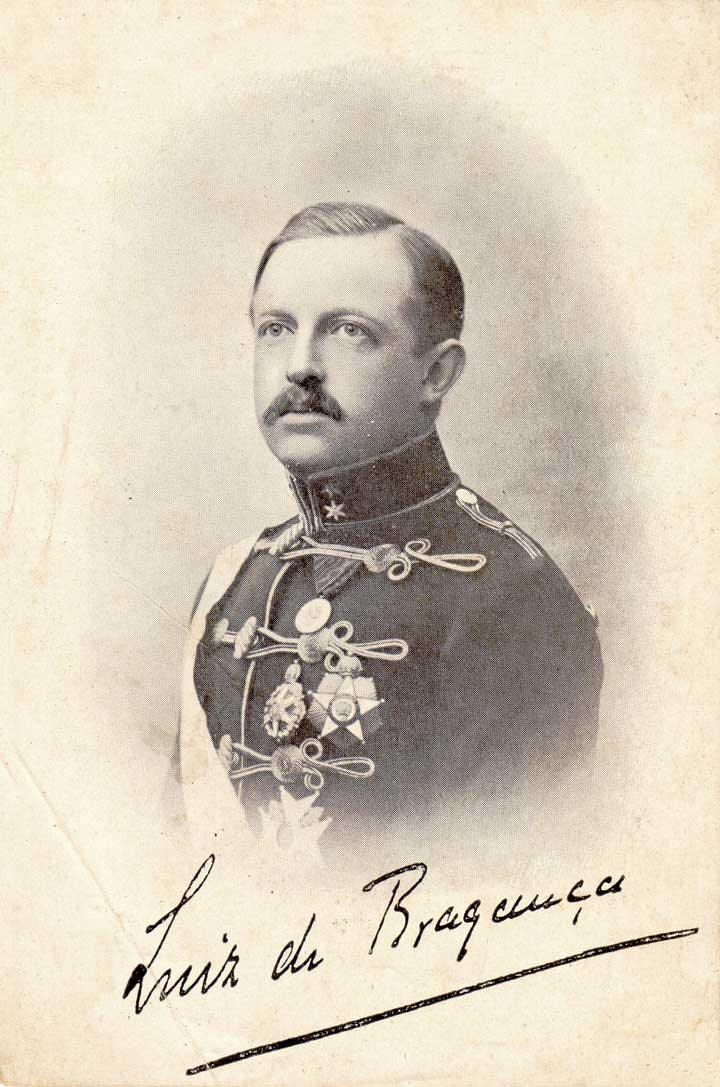
Prince Luís of Orléans-Braganza became Prince Imperial of Brazil after the renunciation of his older brother.

In 1908, Pedro de Alcântara, then Prince Imperial of Brazil in exile, wanted to marry Countess Elisabeth Dobržensky de Dobrženicz (1875–1951), whose family had belonged to the nobility of the kingdom of Bohemia. The countess did not, however, belong to a reigning or formerly reigning dynasty, as both Orléans and Braganza traditions expected of brides. As Prince Pedro wanted to marry with his mother's blessing, he renounced his rights to the throne of Brazil at Cannes on 30 October 1908. If the 1908 renunciation of Pedro de Alcântara was valid, his brother Luiz (and eventually, Pedro Henrique) became next in the line of succession after their mother. Isabel's headship of the Brazilian Imperial House lasted until her death in 1921, when she is widely considered to have been succeeded by her grandson, Prince Pedro Henrique of Orléans-Braganza. Pedro Henrique was the elder son of Prince Luiz, second child of Isabel and a veteran of World War I who had died in 1920 from an illness he contracted in the trenches.

Prince Pedro de Alcântara did not dispute the validity of the renunciation. Though he did not claim the headship of the Imperial House himself, in 1937 he did say in an interview that his renunciation "did not meet the requirements of Brazilian Law, there was no prior consultation with the nation, there was none of the necessary protocol that is required for acts of this nature and, furthermore, it was not a hereditary renunciation."

The dynastic dispute over the Brazilian crown began after 1940 when Prince Pedro Gastão of Orléans-Braganza, eldest son of Pedro de Alcântara repudiated his father's renunciation and claimed the headship of the Brazilian Imperial House.

Pedro Gastão actively campaigned in support of Brazil's 1993 referendum on restoration of the Brazilian monarchy, which would have postponed for subsequent decision by Parliament of which descendant of the former imperial family should occupy the throne if monarchy had been re-instated, but the option of restoration was defeated despite garnering approximately 17 million votes. After the death of Pedro Gastão in 2007, his eldest son Prince Pedro Carlos and younger children declared themselves republicans. Several of Pedro Gastão's grandchildren also have dual citizenship.

== Vassouras branch ==
As the current Head of the Vassouras Branch Bertrand also has no children and has never been married, if Bertrand dies, the leadership will pass to his nephew Prince Rafael Antônio, who is the son of his late brother Antônio João of Orléans-Braganza and who holds the legitimate title of Prince Imperial of Brazil, as heir presumptive to his uncle. Antônio João, Rafael's father, had 4 children: Prince Pedro Luiz, Amélia Maria, Rafael Antônio and Maria Gabriela. Antônio's first son, Prince Pedro Luiz, died on Air France Flight 447, and was fourth in the line of succession when he died, Antonio's second daughter, Amélia Maria, was committed to resign her dynasty rights and the Brazilian princely title upon her marriage, although this is not legally allowed by Brazil's monarchical constitution without parliamentary approval. Antonio's last daughter, Maria Gabriela, is third in line to the throne and head the Imperial House.

Currently, Eleonora de Ligne is fourth in line to head the Imperial House of Brazil, she married the head of the House of Ligne of Belgium, Michel, Prince of Ligne, with whom she had two children: Princess Alix and Henri Antoine, Crown Prince of Ligne.

== Petropolis branch ==
For others, the person who succeeded by right to Isabel Leopoldina at the head of the imperial house was her son Pedro de Alcântara, Prince of Grão-Pará, considering the instrument of resignation signed by him null and void. After the death of Pedro de Alcântara (1940), his son Pedro Gastão (until 2007) and his grandson Pedro Carlos of Orleans-Braganza would have risen successively.

Head of the Imperial House of Brazil House of Orléans-Braganza Cadet branch of the House of Orléans
Preceded by Luiz of Orléans-Braganza	Bertrand of Orleans-Braganza; 15 July 2022 – present	Incumbent
