= Bertrand of Orléans-Braganza =

Claimant to the Brazilian throne

Bertrand
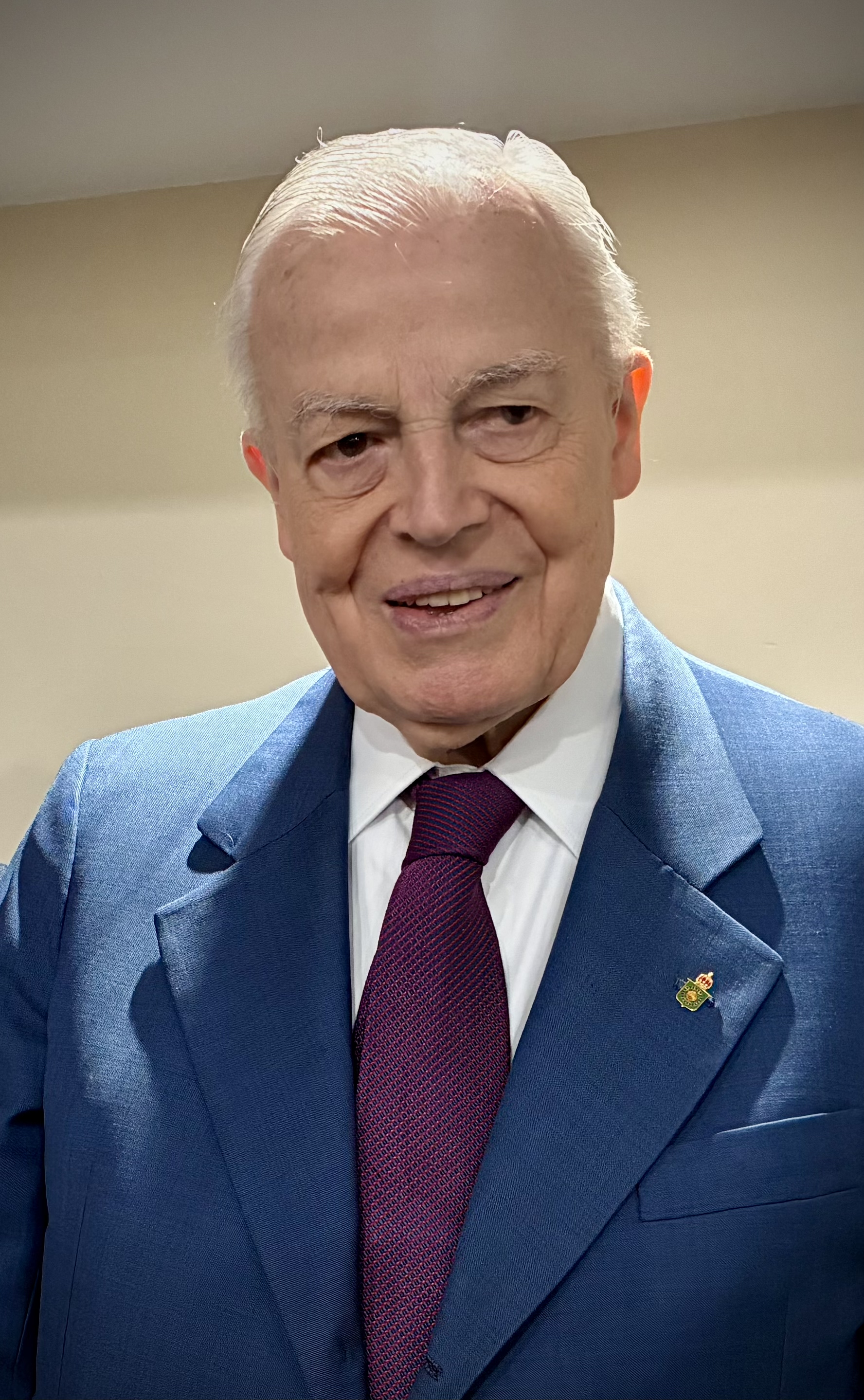
- Bertrand in 2026 (by Monarquia Wiki)

Head of the Imperial House of Brazil (disputed)
- Tenure: 15 July 2022 – present
- Predecessor: Luiz of Orléans-Braganza
- Heir presumptive: Rafael of Orléans-Braganza
- Born: 2 February 1941 (age 85); Mandelieu-la-Napoule, Vichy France
Names
- Bertrand Maria José Pio Januário Miguel Gabriel Raphael Gonzaga de Orléans e Bragança
- House: Orléans-Braganza
- Father: Pedro Henrique of Orléans-Braganza
- Mother: Princess Maria Elisabeth of Bavaria
- Religion: Roman Catholicism
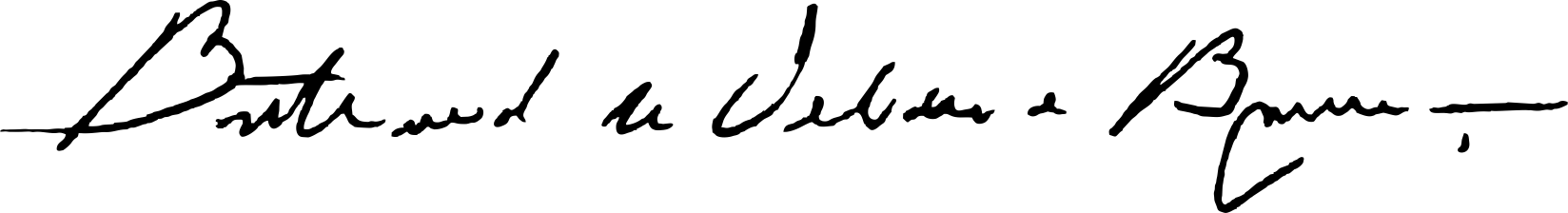
- Signature

Bertrand of Orléans-Braganza (born 2 February 1941) is the current head of the Vassouras branch of the House of Orléans-Braganza. He is one of the two principal claimants to the defunct Brazilian throne.

He assumed the headship of the branch on 15 July 2022, following the death of his elder brother, Luiz of Orléans-Braganza. The Vassouras claim is contested by the rival Petrópolis branch, headed by Pedro Carlos of Orléans-Braganza. Both men are great-grandsons of Isabel, Princess Imperial of Brazil, the daughter and heiress of Emperor Pedro II of the House of Braganza. The long-standing rivalry between the two branches originates in a dynastic dispute concerning the validity of the 1908 renunciation of succession rights by Pedro de Alcântara, Prince of Grão-Pará (eldest son of Princess Isabel and grandfather of Pedro Carlos), and the consequent rights of his younger brother Luís and the latter’s descendants.

== Early life and education ==
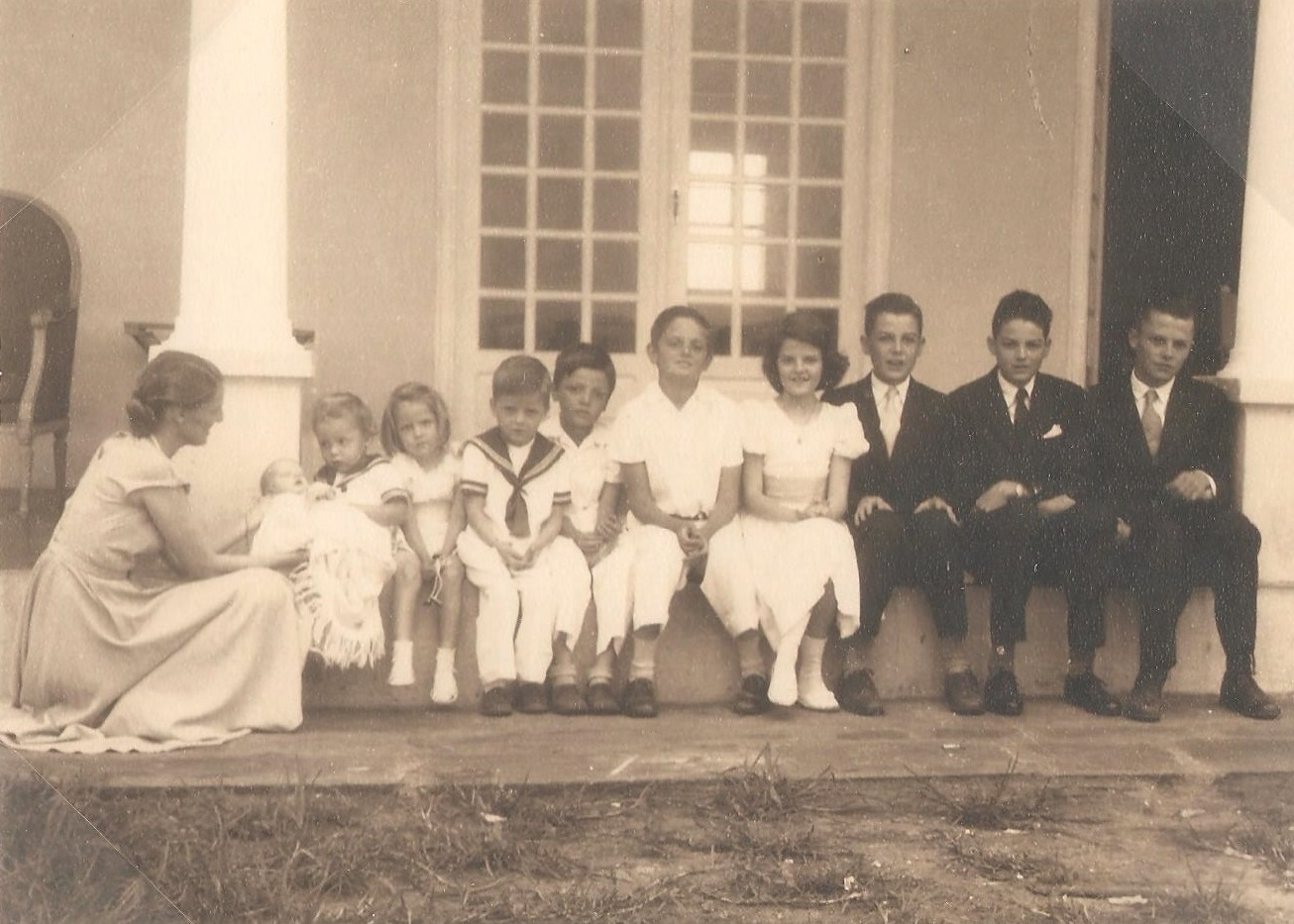
Bertrand (third, from right) with his mother and siblings, 1957

Bertrand was born on 2 February 1941 in Mandelieu-la-Napoule, in southern France (then under the Vichy regime), during the height of the Second World War. He was the third son of Prince Pedro Henrique of Orléans-Braganza, then head of the Vassouras branch of the Brazilian Imperial Family and a claimant to the Brazilian throne, and his wife Princess Maria Elisabeth of Bavaria, a member of the House of Wittelsbach. His godparents were his great-uncle Prince Gennaro of Bourbon-Two Sicilies and his aunt Princess Pia Maria, Countess of Nicolaÿ.

Although the Brazilian government had revoked the imperial family's banishment in 1920, the outbreak of war kept the family in Europe. Bertrand arrived in Brazil at the age of four in 1945, shortly after the end of the conflict.

The family first settled in the Palácio do Grão-Pará in Petrópolis and Rio de Janeiro. They later moved to a farm purchased by his father in the northern region of Paraná (specifically areas such as Jacarezinho and Jundiaí do Sul), which was then a developing agricultural frontier. Bertrand spent much of his childhood on this farm, experiencing rural Brazilian life.

He received part of his secondary education in Paraná and later studied at the traditional St. Ignatius College, Rio de Janeiro, a Jesuit institution known for its rigorous academic standards, moral formation, and emphasis on Catholic doctrine. He also attended other schools such as Colégio Coração Eucarístico and Cristo Rei in Jacarezinho.

In 1959, at the age of 18, Bertrand moved to São Paulo. In 1964 he graduated with a bachelor's degree in Law from the Faculty of Law of the University of São Paulo (Faculdade de Direito do Largo de São Francisco). During his university years he stood out as an active student leader in anticommunist circles, and his class of 1964 is still sometimes referred to as "The Prince's Class" ("A Turma do Príncipe").

From a very young age Bertrand received a thorough traditional Catholic formation, guided by his father toward doctrinal study and the analysis of national and international events. He participated enthusiastically in the ideological debates that marked Brazilian academia in the early 1960s. His formation was further enriched by frequent trips to Europe; one notable journey coincided with the first session of the Second Vatican Council, during which he had close contact with Catholic intellectuals in Rome.

His early exposure to Plínio Corrêa de Oliveira — a longtime friend of his father since their childhood in Paris — deeply influenced his worldview. Bertrand joined the Tradition, Family and Property (TFP) movement as a youth alongside his father and brothers, beginning a lifelong commitment to traditionalist Catholic and conservative causes.

== Public role and monarchist activism ==
Bertrand is the leading spokesperson and activist for the restoration of the Brazilian monarchy, a role he has held prominently since succeeding his brother as head of the Vassouras branch in 2022. He frequently travels across Brazil delivering lectures, participating in public events, and engaging with monarchist groups, often at the invitation of private institutions, municipal governments, legislative assemblies, and occasionally federal bodies. His activities focus on promoting the idea of constitutional monarchy as a source of stability, moral order, and continuity for Brazil, contrasting it with what he describes as the chronic instability and corruption of the republican system established in 1889. Both he and his elder brother, Luiz, were engaged in monarchist proselytism in Brazil. They both played main roles during the campaign for the 1993 plebiscite, which represented the hitherto only real opportunity for a return of the monarchy since the proclamation of the republic, in 1889. In it, the people were asked to choose which form of government (presidential or parliamentary) and which form of state organization (republic or constitutional monarchy) Brazil should have. The monarchist cause was not successful, receiving only 13.4% of the vote.

Bertrand maintains close ties with traditionalist Catholic organizations. He has long been associated with the Tradition, Family and Property (TFP) movement founded by Plínio Corrêa de Oliveira and, following internal divisions, with the Plinio Corrêa de Oliveira Institute (IPCO) . He has spoken at numerous events organized by these groups, including an international visit to TFP chapters in New York, Washington, D.C., and Miami in 2001. He continues to address IPCO and affiliated audiences on topics linking faith, monarchy, and resistance to modern ideologies.

His media presence increased notably in the 2010s. In 2016, he gave a prominent interview to journalist Mariana Godoy on RedeTV!, gaining broader public recognition. On 22 September 2017, he appeared on the popular late-night talk show The Noite com Danilo Gentili, breaking the program's audience record at the time. He has also been featured in major outlets such as O Estado de S. Paulo and has participated in international coverage, including profiles in The Wall Street Journal and Financial Times.

Bertrand participates annually in the National Monarchist Meeting (Encontro Monárquico Nacional) and other gatherings. He has spoken in the Brazilian Chamber of Deputies and Senate on occasions tied to historical commemorations, such as tributes to Empress Leopoldina and the bicentennials of key imperial figures. He presided over or addressed events like the "Sábado Imperial" in Curitiba and various regional monarchist forums.

Internationally, he has engaged with conservative and Catholic audiences, including speeches on Christendom, natural law, and counter-revolutionary themes. In 2020, he commented publicly on statue defense controversies in the United States, drawing parallels with Brazilian cultural preservation.

Despite these efforts, the monarchist movement remains a minority position in Brazil. Bertrand has acknowledged polls showing support ranging from around 11% to higher figures in specific contexts, and he continues to advocate for a future plebiscite on the form of government.

In recognition of his cultural and historical advocacy, he received the title of Doctor *Honoris Causa* from Universidade Santa Úrsula in Rio de Janeiro in 2025.

== Political and social views ==
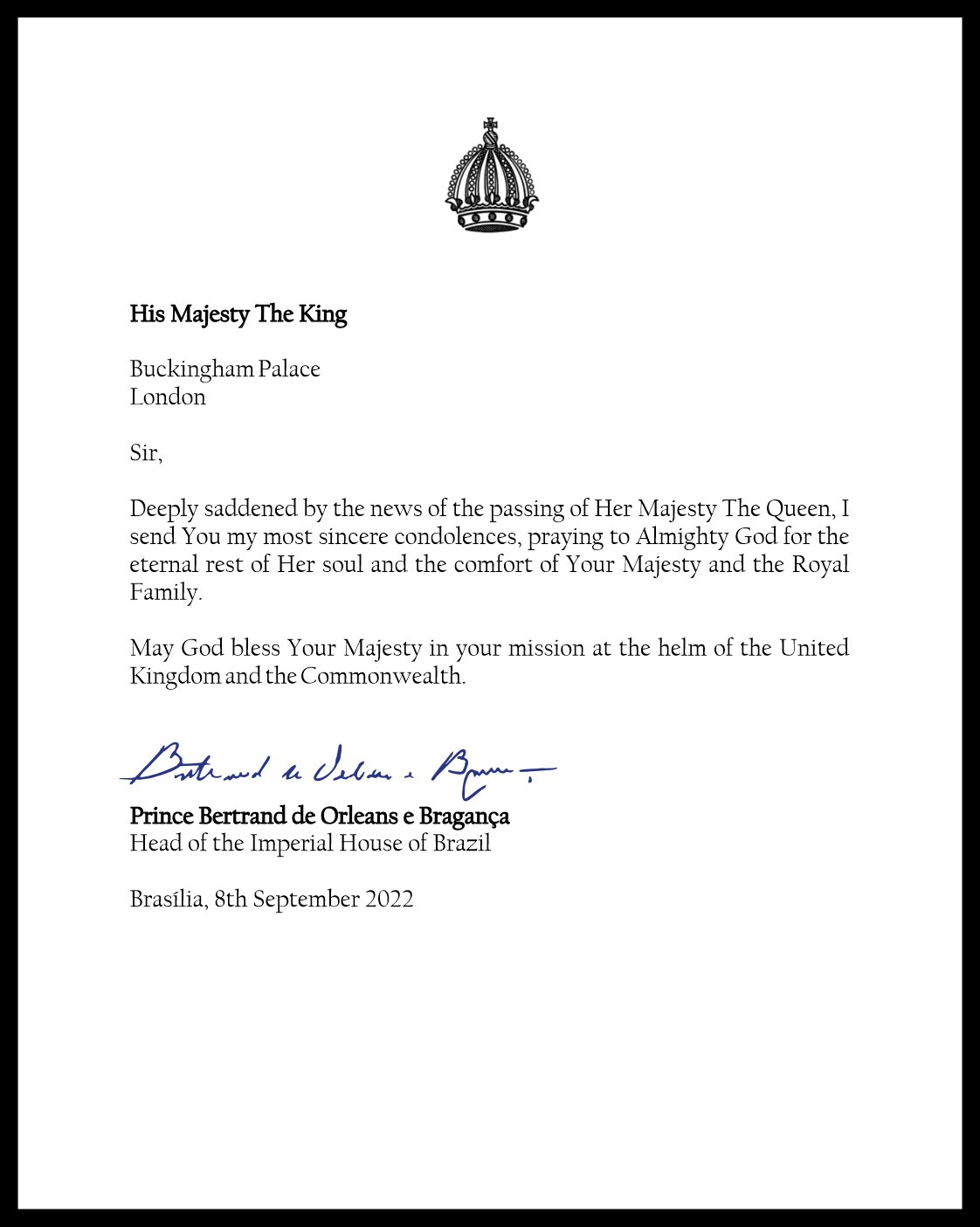
Bertrand message to Charles III.

Bertrand holds strongly traditionalist conservative positions rooted in Traditionalist Catholicism and the teachings of the pre-Vatican II Church. He is a vocal anti-communist and critic of modern secularism, liberalism, and what he describes as revolutionary ideologies. He views Catholic social teaching, natural law, and the defense of tradition, family, and private property as the foundations of a just society.

He is a longstanding member and collaborator of the Tradition, Family and Property (TFP) movement and its successor organization, the Plínio Corrêa de Oliveira Institute (IPCO). Through these groups, he promotes the restoration of a Christian social order and opposes what he sees as the erosion of Christendom by secular and egalitarian ideologies.

=== Views on family, life issues, and sexuality ===
Bertrand opposes abortion in all circumstances, describing it as a "monstrous murder" and a grave offense against God. He has participated in pro-life demonstrations and conferences calling for the total criminalization of the practice. He also rejects the legal recognition of same-sex marriage, viewing it as contrary to natural law and the traditional family structure centered on heterosexual marriage and procreation.

In a 2017 public statement, he described homosexuality as "a defect" in line with traditional Catholic moral teaching, a remark that drew both support from conservative audiences and criticism from progressive groups.

=== Environmental and economic views ===
Bertrand is a prominent critic of radical environmentalism. In his 2012 book Psicose Ambientalista (Environmentalist Psychosis), he argues that certain environmental movements, including aspects of climate activism and groups like the Landless Workers' Movement (MST), serve as vehicles for ideological control, egalitarianism, and anti-Christian agendas rather than genuine conservation. He has described global warming concerns as exaggerated or part of a "hoax" promoted by "eco-terrorists" and has called environmentalism a form of "psychological disorder" in some contexts.

He strongly defends private property and free enterprise, coordinating the Paz no Campo movement to oppose rural invasions and expansive land reforms. Economically, he favors limited state intervention and supports policies aligned with free-market principles, as evidenced by his alignment with aspects of the Bolsonaro administration's economic agenda.

=== Views on governance and monarchy ===
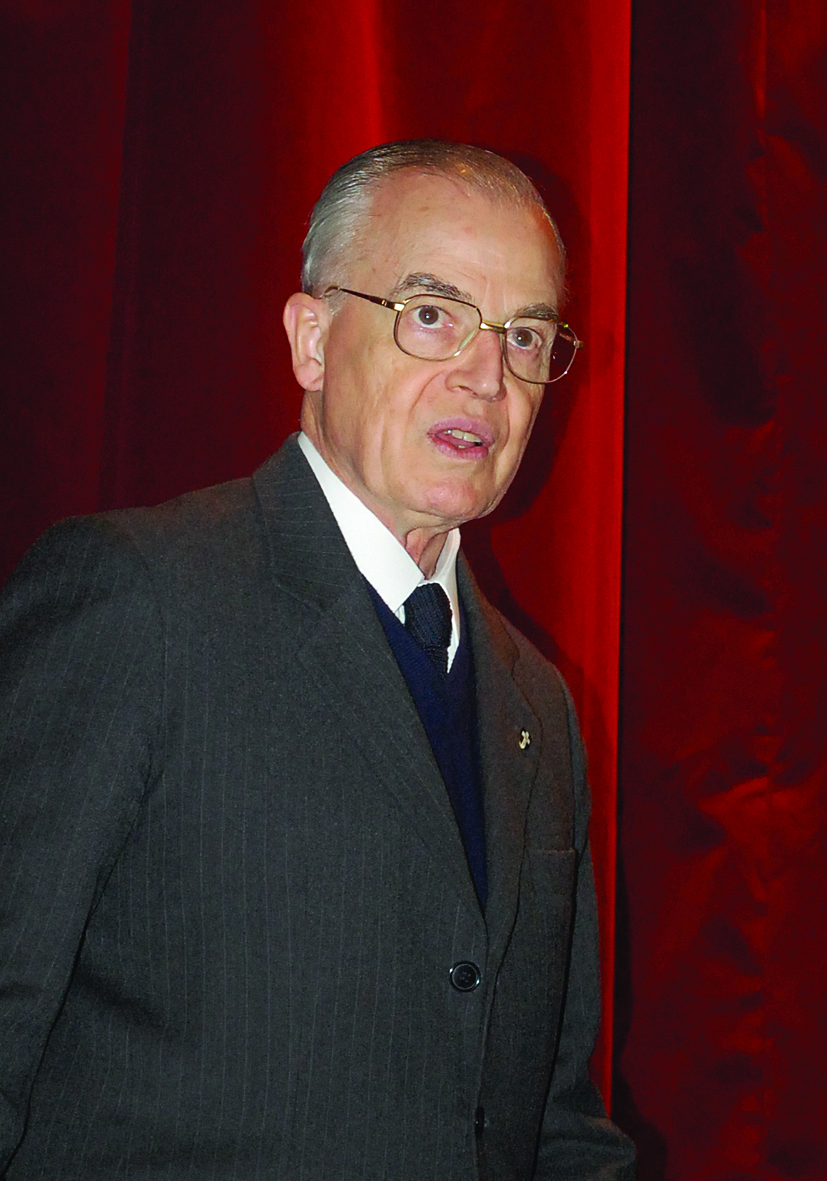
Bertrand in 2011

Bertrand is a sharp critic of the Brazilian Republic, established after the 1889 coup. He argues that it has produced chronic instability, corruption, high electoral costs, and destructive conflicts between branches of government due to the absence of a "moderating power" such as that exercised by the Emperor under the 1824 Constitution. He advocates for the restoration of a constitutional monarchy as a stabilizing force rooted in hereditary legitimacy, moral order, and Christian principles.

He has expressed support for conservative governments that align with his values, including public backing for Jair Bolsonaro's 2018 candidacy and administration, citing shared stances on anti-abortion policies, gun rights, and skepticism toward certain environmental regulations.

On international issues, he warns against globalism, communism in its various forms, and supranational organizations that he believes undermine national sovereignty and Christian civilization. He advocates restoring Christendom, where the state recognizes the primacy of the Church in moral and natural law matters.

His views have drawn both strong support from traditionalist and conservative circles and criticism from progressive and left-leaning commentators, who describe them as ultraconservative or retrograde.

== Private life ==
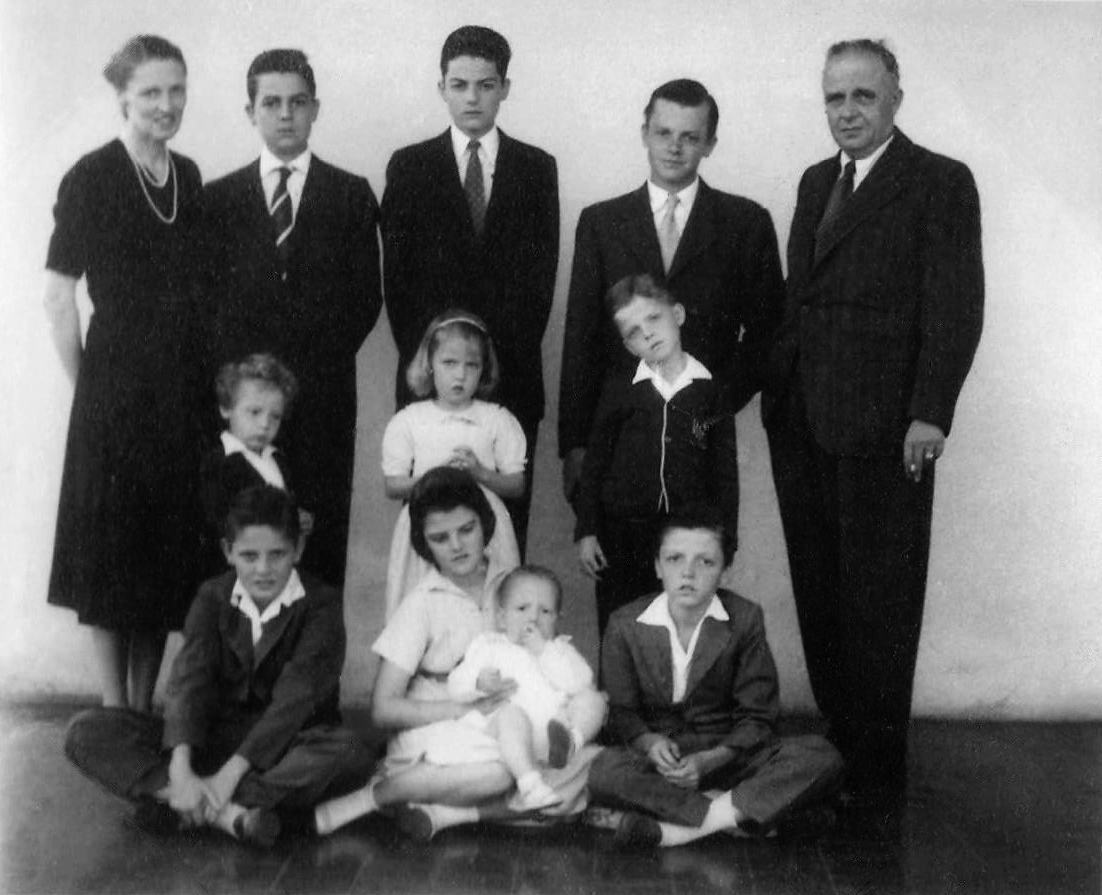
Brazilian Imperial Family, 1950s.

Bertrand has never married and has no children, a choice he has described as one of chastity in line with his deep traditional Catholic faith. He has prioritized his dynastic responsibilities and public advocacy over forming a personal family. This childless status has direct consequences for the succession within the Vassouras branch.

He maintains a deliberately modest and low-profile personal life in São Paulo, where he has long resided. For many years he has lived in a rented two-bedroom apartment in the Pacaembu neighborhood, an arrangement that underscores the limited financial resources of the imperial family after more than a century of republican rule and exile. He shares or shared the residence with his late brother Luiz in earlier periods.

A devout traditionalist Catholic, Bertrand has received Holy Communion daily since the age of 17. He has stated that he has missed it only twice in his life — once due to a curfew in Bolivia and once because of a snowstorm in Washington, D.C. This daily practice remains central to his personal routine and spiritual life.

After the death of his younger brother Prince Antônio in November 2024, the line of succession shifted to his nephew, Prince Rafael of Orléans-Braganza.

== Honours ==
Styles of Prince Bertrand of Orléans-Braganza
- Reference style: His Imperial and Royal Highness
- Spoken style: Your Imperial and Royal Highness

As Head of the Brazilian Imperial Family, Bertrand claims the following positions:

- Grand Master and Sovereign of the Imperial Order of Our Lord Jesus Christ
- Grand Master and Sovereign of the Imperial Order of Saint Benedict of Aviz
- Grand Master and Sovereign of the Imperial Order of Saint James of the Sword
- Grand Master and Sovereign of the Imperial Order of the Cross
- Grand Master and Sovereign of the Imperial Order of Emperor Pedro I
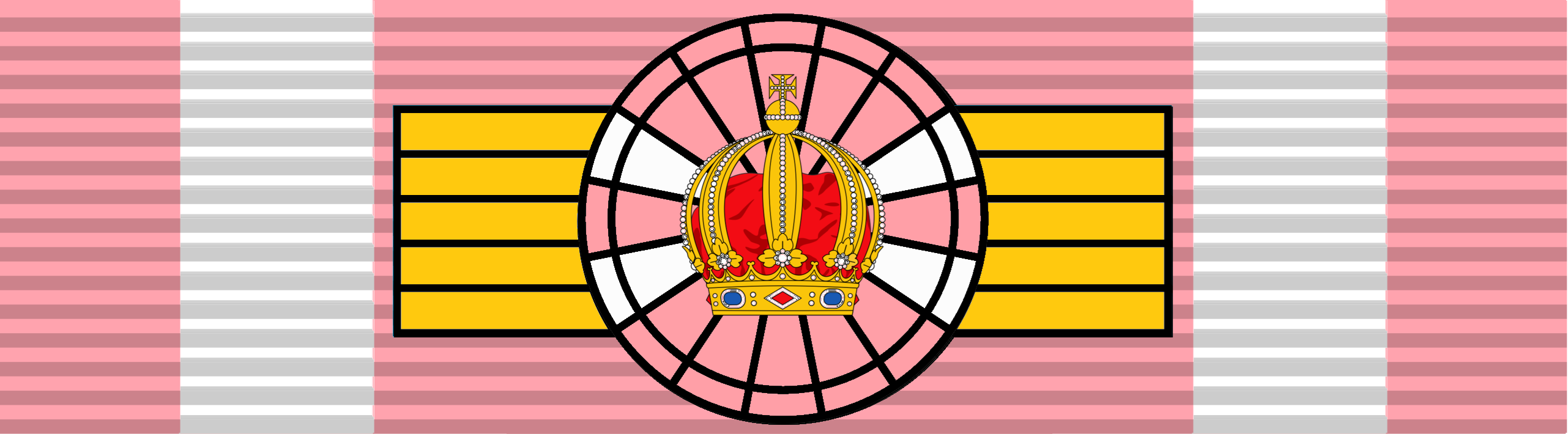
- Grand Master and Sovereign of the Imperial Order of the Rose

Bertrand has also received other honours:

- Bailiff Grand Cross of Honour and Devotion of the Sovereign Military Order of Malta
- Knight of the Order of the Holy Sepulchre
- Bailiff Grand Cross of the Sacred Military Constantinian Order of Saint George
- Grand Cross of the Order of the Immaculate Conception of Vila Viçosa
- Medal of the Pacifier Duke of Caxias (2009)
- High Distinction of the Order of Military Judicial Merit (2009)
- Commander of the Order of Military Merit (2013)
- Tiradentes Medal (2018)
- Grand cross of the National Order of Commercial Merit (2024)
- Doctor Honoris Causa from Universidade Santa Úrsula (2025)
- Honorary member of the Brazilian Air Force (2026)

Bertrand of Orléans-Braganza House of Orléans-Braganza Cadet branch of the House of Orléans Born: 2 February 1941
Titles in pretence
Preceded by Luiz of Orléans-Braganza	— TITULAR — Head of the Imperial House of Brazil; One of two pretenders to the Brazilian throne 15 July 2022 – present Reason for succession failure: Empire abolished in 1889	Incumbent; Heir: Rafael of Orléans-Braganza
