= Order of Pedro I =

Brazilian honorary order

Imperial Order of Pedro I
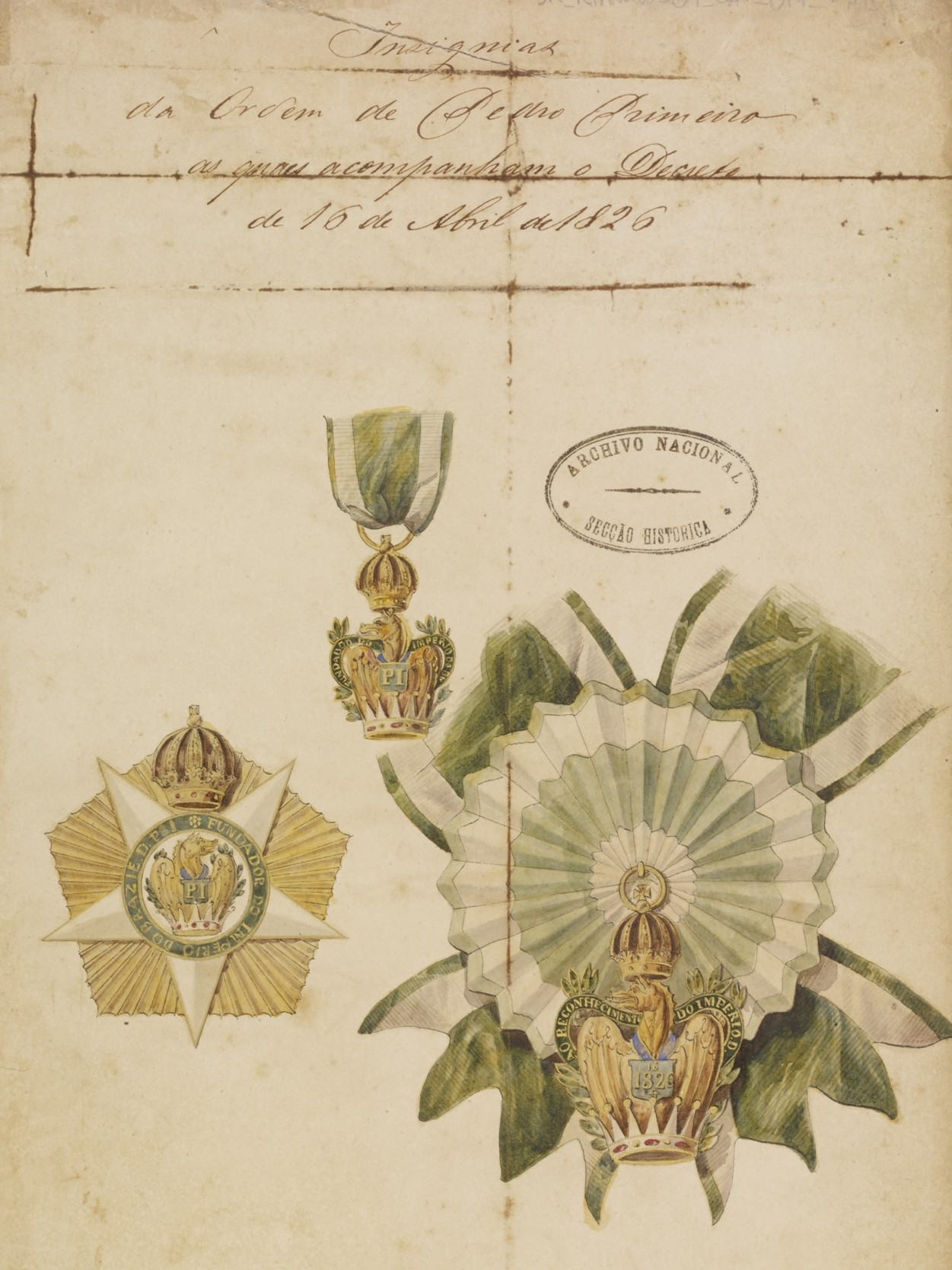
- Imperial Order of Pedro I, Grand Cross. Original drawn at Arquivo Nacional

Awarded by the Head of the Brazilian Imperial Family
- Type: Dynastic order
- Established: 16 April 1826 – 22 March 1890 (National Order); 15 November 1889 – present (House Order)
- Royal house: House of Orleans-Braganza
- Grand Master: Disputed: Prince Bertrand of Orléans-Braganza; Prince Pedro Carlos of Orléans-Braganza
- Grades: Grand Cross; Commander; Knight

Precedence
- Next (higher): Imperial Order of the Cross
- Next (lower): Imperial Order of the Rose
- Ribbon bar of the order

The Imperial Order of Dom Pedro I (Portuguese: Imperial Ordem de Pedro Primeiro or Imperial Ordem de Pedro Primeiro, Fundador do Império do Brasil) is a Brazilian order of chivalry instituted by Emperor Pedro I of Brazil on 16 April 1826. It is considered by many numismatists as the rarest of the Brazilian imperial orders.

On 22 March 1890, the order was cancelled as national order by the interim government of United States of Brazil. Since the deposition in 1889 of the last Brazilian monarch, Emperor Pedro II, the order continues as a house order being awarded by the Heads of the House of Orleans-Braganza, pretenders to the defunct throne of Brazil. The current Brazilian Imperial Family is split into two branches Petrópolis and Vassouras, and the Grand Mastership of the Order is disputed between those two branches.

== History ==
Created by a short decree of 16 April 1826, the order initially consisted of one grade and was only awarded to reigning monarchs. It was only regularized by Decree No. 228 of 19 October 1842, which would finally establish its degrees, number of holders and establish the design of the insignia. In that time, it was characterized as a strictly personal award of Emperor Pedro I, its grand master, which awarded only one person: his father-in-law Francis II, Holy Roman Emperor. It was Emperor Pedro II who most distributed the order, being, nevertheless, the Brazilian order that had fewer holders.

It would be intended for both nationals and foreigners, who, as well as members of the Imperial Family (who were Grand Crosses of the Order from birth), would not need to take oath or respect the maximum number of members of each degree.

Despite what some sources cite, the creator of the project was not Jean-Baptiste Debret, so he himself does not know how to accurately describe the insignia in his Voyage Pittoresque et Historique au Brésil.

== Characteristics ==
Many authors point out the similarities of this with the insignia of the French Order of the Iron Crown.

=== Insignia ===
Grand cross

- Obverse: topped by imperial crown, winged dragon, in reference to the House of Braganza, red sole and out of crown (old), garnished with fruity coffee branches and topped with green ribbon with gold inscription Founder of the Empire of Brazil. The dragon carries a green and gold shield with the inscription P.I. The crown of the city, enamelled with white and gold-plated, does not appear on the posterior insignia, and the dragon is completed with its tail.
- Reverse: equal, differentiating itself by the legend inscribed in the shield: now To the recognition of the Empire of Brazil ora 16-4-1826.

Tape and band

- Green in color with white borders.

=== Degrees ===
- Grand Cross (styled "Excellency" and limited to 12 recipients)
- Commander ( styled "Senhor" and limited to 40 recipients)
- Knight (limited to 100 recipients)

== Recipients ==
Officially, Luís Alves de Lima e Silva, Duke of Caxias was the only Brazilian awarded the commendation. There are discussions as to whether Felisberto Caldeira Brant, the Marquis of Barbacena, would have been honored as a knight or great cross. It is supposed, however, that it is a confusion, for the Marquis of Barbacena was in fact the bearer of the Grand Cross granted to Francis I of Austria, the latter being the first to be awarded. From what can be found in records, only these holders of the Order are considered official outside of any recent conferrals by either branch of the family:

- (Russian Empire) Alexander III of Russia
- (July Monarchy) Prince Louis, Duke of Nemours
- (July Monarchy) Prince Gaston, Count of Eu
- (Kingdom of the Two Sicilies) Francis II of the Two Sicilies
- (Kingdom of the Two Sicilies) Princess Maria di Grazia of Bourbon-Two Sicilies
- (Austrian Empire) Francis II, Holy Roman Emperor
- Leopold II of Belgium
- (United Kingdom of Great Britain and Ireland) Victoria of the United Kingdom

== Literature ==
- Poliano, Luís Marques. Heráldica. Ed. GRD. Rio de Janeiro, 1986.
- Poliano, Luís Marques. Ordens honoríficas do Brasil.
