= Princess Maria di Grazia of Bourbon-Two Sicilies =

Princess Maria di Grazia
- Princess Imperial of Brazil
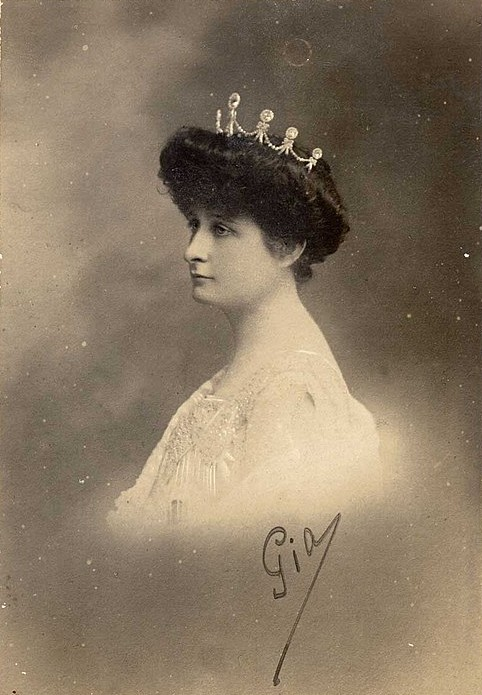
- Maria in 1909
- Born: 12 August 1878; Cannes, France
- Died: 20 June 1973 (aged 94); Mandelieu-la-Napoule, France
- Burial: Chapelle royale de Dreux, France
- Spouse: Prince Luís of Orléans-Braganza (m. 1908; died 1920)
- Issue: Prince Pedro Henrique; Prince Luiz Gastão; Princess Pia Maria, Countess of Nicolay
Names
- Italian: Maria delle Grazie Pia Chiara Anna Teresa Isabella Luitgarda Apollonia Agata Cecilia Filomena Antonia Lucia Cristina Caterina di Borbone
- House: Bourbon-Two Sicilies (by birth); Orléans-Braganza (by marriage)
- Father: Prince Alfonso, Count of Caserta
- Mother: Princess Maria Antonietta of the Two Sicilies

Princess Maria di Grazia of Bourbon-Two Sicilies (12 August 1878 – 20 June 1973) was a Princess of Bourbon-Two Sicilies by birth as well as Princess Imperial of Brazil and Princess of Orleans-Braganza through her marriage to Prince Luiz of Orléans-Braganza, secondborn son and pretense heir of Isabel, Princess Imperial of Brazil.

== Early life and family ==
Princess Maria was born at their parents' Villa Maria Teresa in Cannes, where her family had been exiled since the 1861 due to the Italian Unification. She was the sixth child and third daughter of Prince Alfonso, Count of Caserta and his wife Princess Antonietta of Bourbon-Two Sicilies. She was usually called “Maria Pia”. Her father, the third son of King Ferdinand II of the Two Sicilies, became Head of the Royal House of the Two Sicilies with the death of his elder brother, King Francis II, in 1894. Maria di Grazia was baptized and had Robert I, Duke of Parma, and his first wife, Princess Maria Pia of the Two Sicilies, as godparents.

Maria di Grazia and her sisters were educated at the College of the Sacred Heart of Aix-Provence, an institution run by nuns near Cannes. There, Maria di Grazia spent her childhood and, after finishing her studies, her youth. Being her father's favorite, she was the one who resolved her brothers' small childhood disputes.

In one of the visits of the Emperor Pedro II of Brazil to Cannes, he visited the Villa Maria Teresa. The Count of Caserta gathered all his children to present them to the monarch, and Maria di Grazia, at the age of ten, had to play "Turkish March" by Mozart, on the piano.

Upon turning 18, Maria di Grazia was taken with her sisters to be presented to the court of Emperor Franz Joseph I of Austria. The reception took place in the Hofburg, Vienna's Imperial Palace. The next day there was a family dinner at Schönbrunn Palace. After Austria, the princesses were taken to Munich, where they were given a gala lunch by Luitpold, Prince Regent of Bavaria.

== Marriage and issue ==
Princess Maria di Grazia met her future fiancé when they were still young, when Luiz eventually arrived in Europe due to the exile imposed by the proclamation of the republic in Brazil in 1889. They later reconnected in 1903 when Prince Luiz, then serving in the Austrian Army, was visiting several relatives in France. On 4 November 1908 Princess Maria di Grazia married Prince Luiz Maria of Orléans-Braganza, son of Prince Gaston of Orléans, Count of Eu and Isabel, Princess Imperial of Brazil, in Cannes. They had three children:

- Prince Pedro Henrique Afonso Felipe Maria Miguel Gabriel Rafael Gonzaga of Orléans-Braganza (13 September 1909 – 5 July 1981) married Princess Maria Elisabeth of Bavaria (1914–2011) at Nymphenburg Palace on 19 August 1937. They had twelve children.
- Prince Luiz Gastão Antônio Maria Filipe Miguel Gabriel Rafael Gonzaga of Orléans-Braganza (19 February 1911 – 8 September 1931)
- Princess Pia Maria Raniera Isabella Antonia Vitoria Thereza Amélia Gerarda Raimunda Anna Micaela Rafaela Gabriela Gonzaga of Orléans-Braganza (4 March 1913 – 24 October 2000) married René, Count de Nicolay at Paris on 12 August 1933. They had three sons.

== Later life ==
Prince Luiz died in 1920 leaving Maria a widow for the remainder of her life. In 1922, Maria accompanied the Brazilian Imperial Family to Brazil for the country's centennial celebrations of its independence. During the course of the trip, the Count of Eu died while recumbent upon her shoulder. She nevertheless participated in official events such as the laying of the foundations for the site of the future statue of Christ the Redeemer, in Rio de Janeiro, and visited São Paulo where she stayed at the palace of the Countess of Penteado on Avenida Higienópolis. After that, Princess Maria preferred to live with her children in France, where they could have a better education. She died at her country house in Mandelieu and was later buried at the Chapelle royale de Dreux, with her husband. She was short of her 95th birthday.

== Ancestry ==
Ancestors of Princess Maria di Grazia of Bourbon-Two Sicilies

8. Francis I of the Two Sicilies
4. Ferdinand II of the Two Sicilies
9. Infanta Maria Isabella of Spain
2. Prince Alfonso, Count of Caserta
10. Archduke Charles, Duke of Teschen
5. Archduchess Maria Theresa of Austria
11. Princess Henrietta of Nassau-Weilburg
1. Princess Maria di Grazia of Bourbon-Two Sicilies
12. Francis I of the Two Sicilies (= 8)
6. Prince Francis, Count of Trapani
13. Infanta Maria Isabella of Spain (= 9)
3. Princess Maria Antonietta of Bourbon-Two Sicilies
14. Leopold II, Grand Duke of Tuscany
7. Archduchess Maria Isabella of Austria
15. Princess Maria Antonia of the Two Sicilies
