= Jundiaí do Sul =

Coordinates: 23°27′S 50°17′W

- Municipality
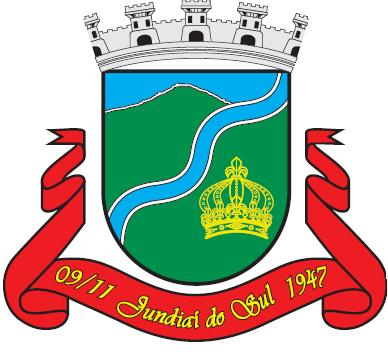
- Coat of arms
- Interactive map of Jundiaí do Sul
- Country: Brazil
- Region: Southern
- State: Paraná
- Mesoregion: Norte Pioneiro Paranaense

Population (2020)
  - Total: 3,269
- Time zone: UTC−3 (BRT)

Jundiaí do Sul is a municipality in the state of Paraná in the Southern Region of Brazil.

== See also ==
- List of municipalities in Paraná
