= Jacarezinho, Paraná =

Jacarezinho
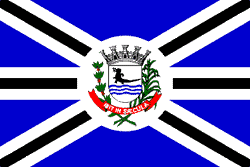
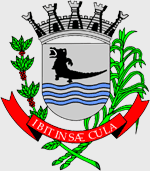
- Flag Coat of arms

- Location in Brazil
- Coordinates: 23°09′39″S 49°58′08″W
- Country: Brazil
- State: Paraná

Government
  - Mayor: Dr. Sérgio Faria (DEM)

Area
  - Total: 602 km^{2} (232 sq mi)
- Elevation: 435 m (1,427 ft)

Population (2020)
  - Total: 39,322
  - Density: 6,488/km^{2} (16,800/sq mi)
- Time zone: UTC-3 (UTC-3)
- Website: Jacarezinho Official Site

Jacarezinho is a municipality in the state of Paraná in Brazil, with around 39,000 inhabitants. It is situated at 23°9′38″S 49°58′10″W near the Jacaré River and it is a major center for the region. Its economy is made up of 34% industries, 55% services (education plays a big part), 11% agriculture (sugar cane, coffee and cattle). The city is the seat of the Roman Catholic Diocese of Jacarezinho.

== Climate ==
Climate data for Jacarezinho, Paraná (1981–2010)
| Month | Jan | Feb | Mar | Apr | May | Jun | Jul | Aug | Sep | Oct | Nov | Dec | Year |
|---|---|---|---|---|---|---|---|---|---|---|---|---|---|
| Mean daily maximum °C (°F) | 31.4 (88.5) | 30.6 (87.1) | 30.1 (86.2) | 28.7 (83.7) | 25.8 (78.4) | 24.8 (76.6) | 25.3 (77.5) | 26.7 (80.1) | 27.6 (81.7) | 29.5 (85.1) | 30.4 (86.7) | 30.4 (86.7) | 28.4 (83.1) |
| Daily mean °C (°F) | 24.9 (76.8) | 24.2 (75.6) | 23.5 (74.3) | 21.7 (71.1) | 18.8 (65.8) | 16.9 (62.4) | 17.0 (62.6) | 18.5 (65.3) | 19.9 (67.8) | 22.2 (72.0) | 23.5 (74.3) | 24.0 (75.2) | 21.3 (70.3) |
| Mean daily minimum °C (°F) | 20.2 (68.4) | 19.9 (67.8) | 19.0 (66.2) | 16.8 (62.2) | 14.1 (57.4) | 11.4 (52.5) | 11.3 (52.3) | 12.4 (54.3) | 14.1 (57.4) | 16.5 (61.7) | 18.0 (64.4) | 19.1 (66.4) | 16.1 (61.0) |
| Average precipitation mm (inches) | 217.5 (8.56) | 183.9 (7.24) | 136.6 (5.38) | 108.1 (4.26) | 116.1 (4.57) | 70.4 (2.77) | 38.8 (1.53) | 39.7 (1.56) | 99.2 (3.91) | 113.4 (4.46) | 152.0 (5.98) | 186.7 (7.35) | 1,462.4 (57.57) |
| Average relative humidity (%) | 77.3 | 79.1 | 78.3 | 78.1 | 82.6 | 79.2 | 71.3 | 66.4 | 66.7 | 67.4 | 69.2 | 74.0 | 74.1 |
Source: Instituto Nacional de Meteorologia
