= Vassouras =

- Municipality
- Municipality of Vassouras
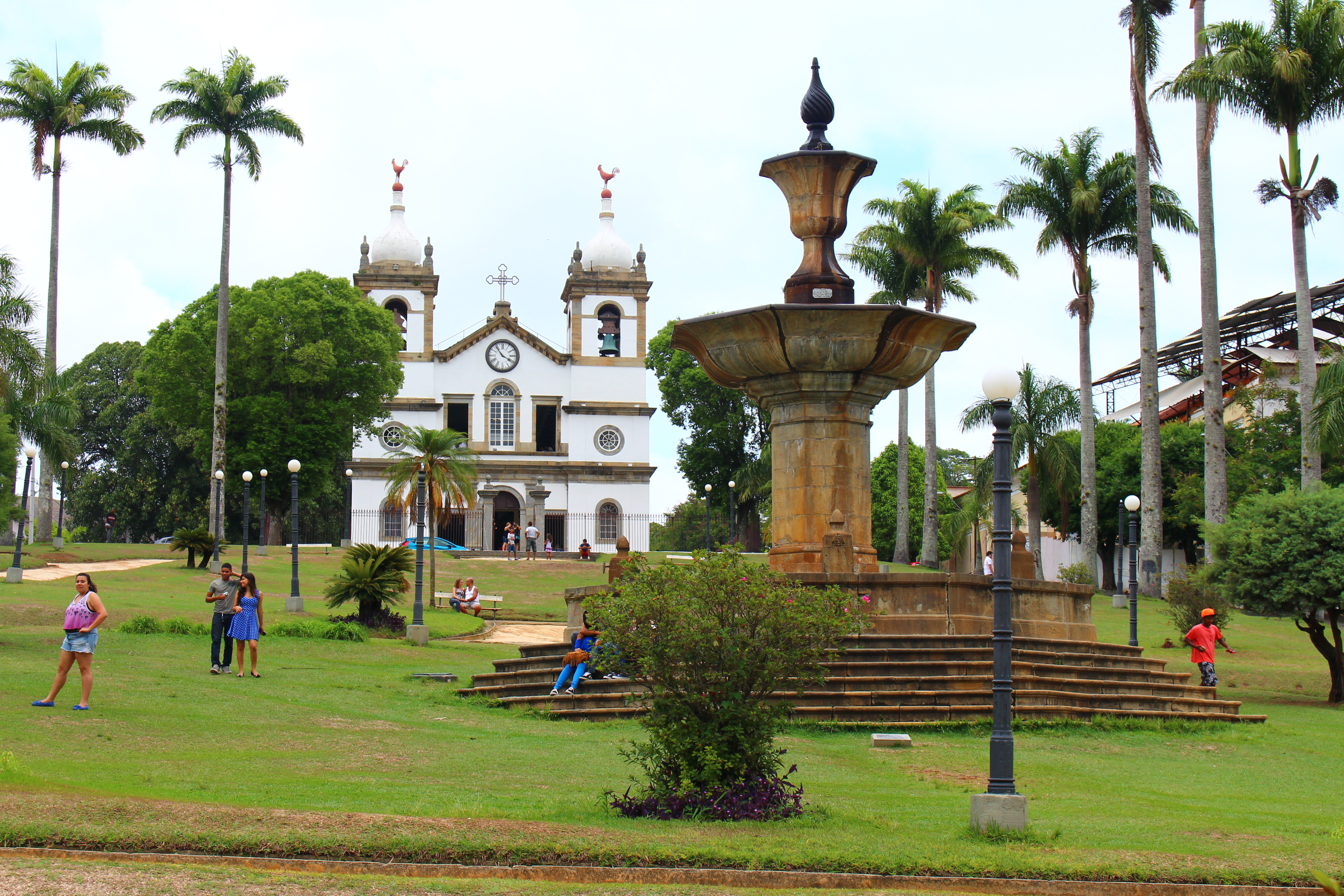
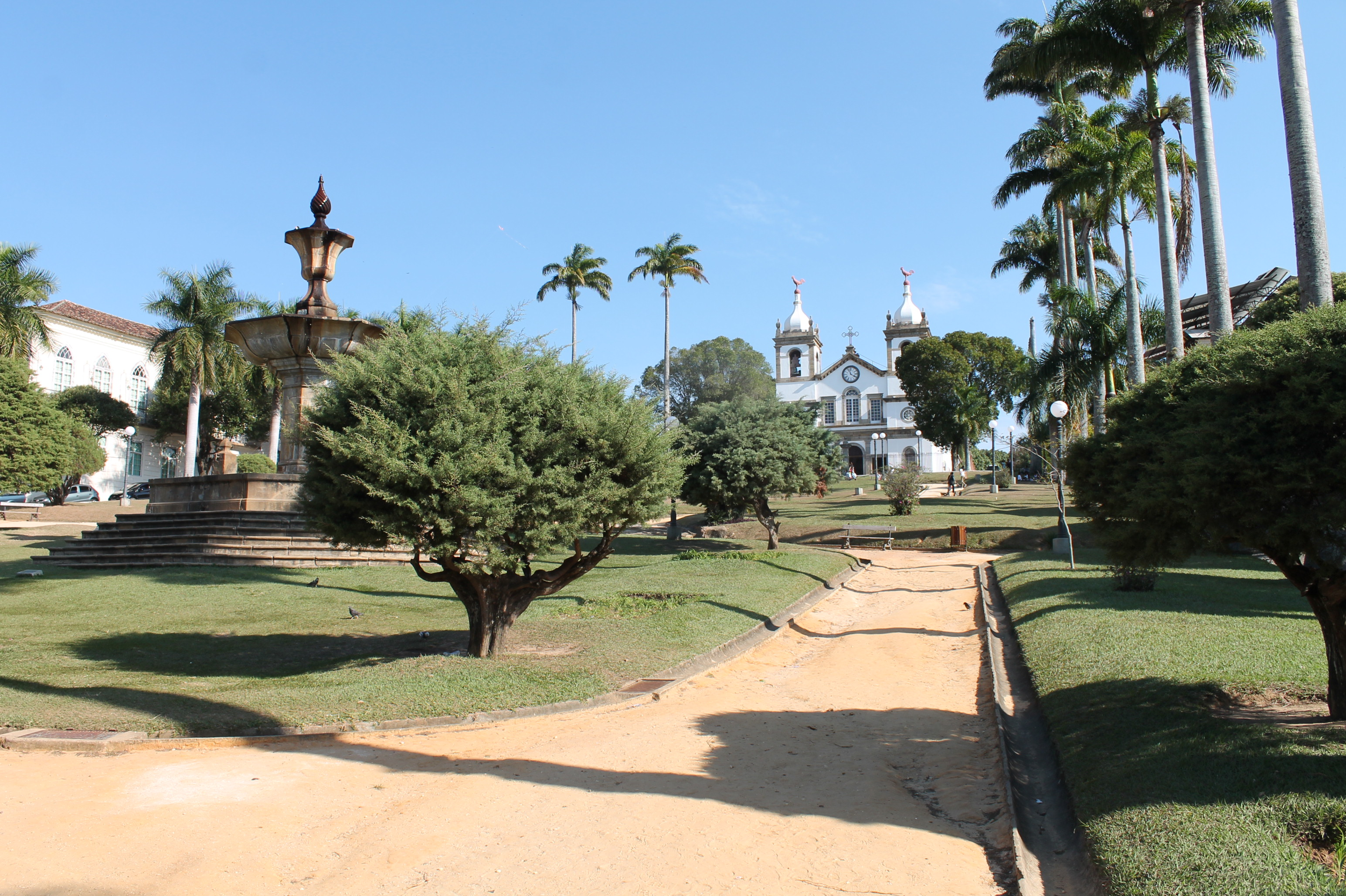
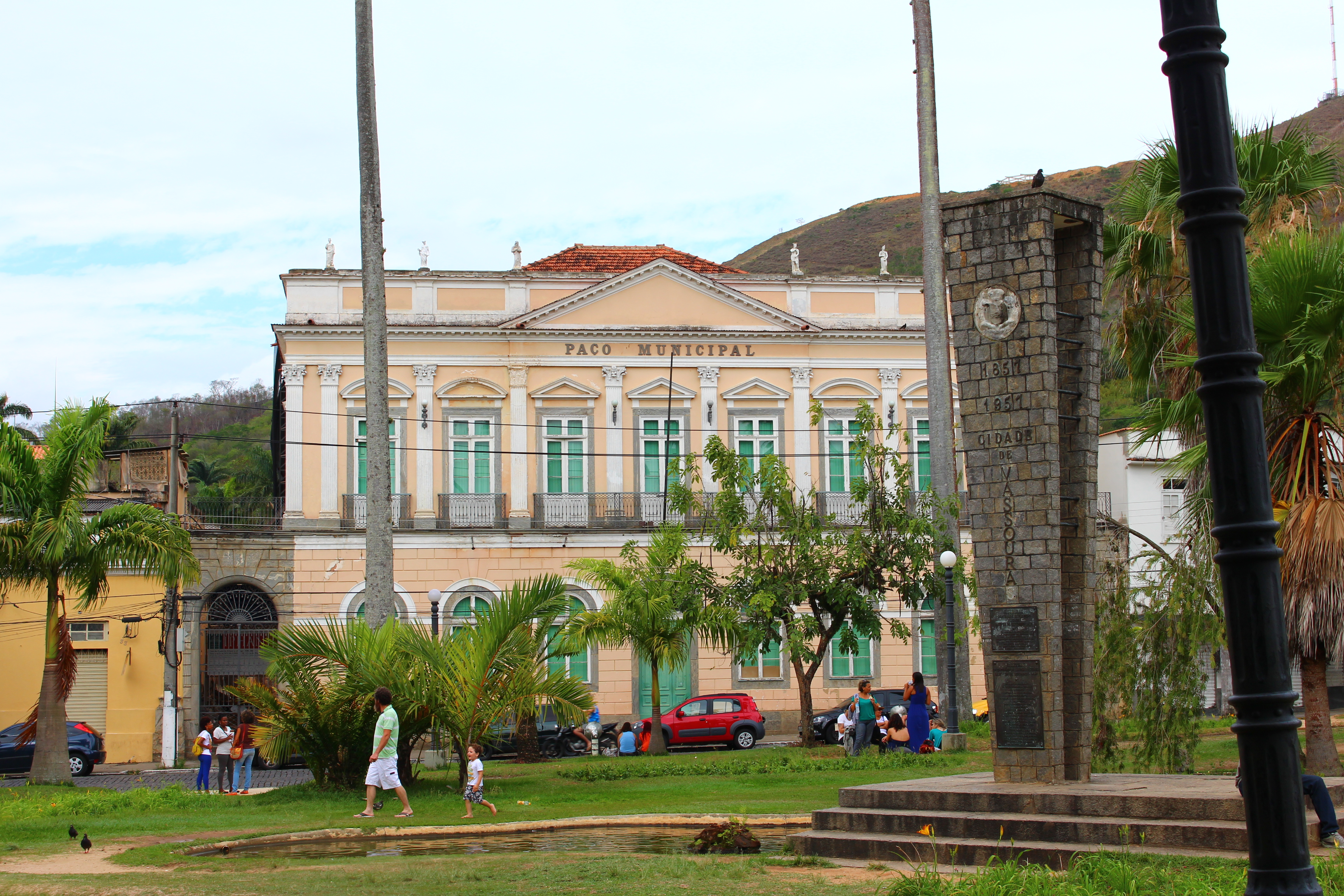
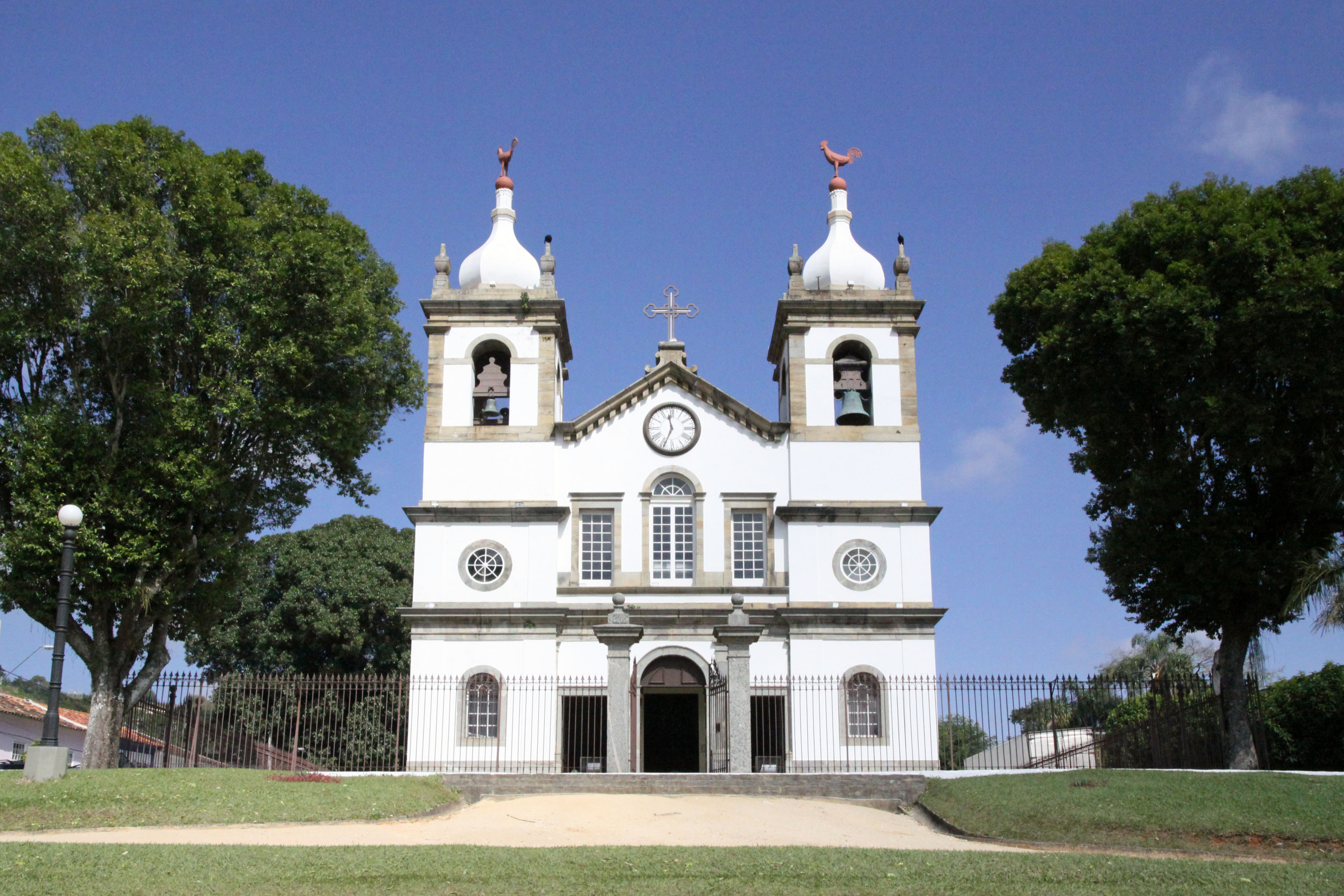
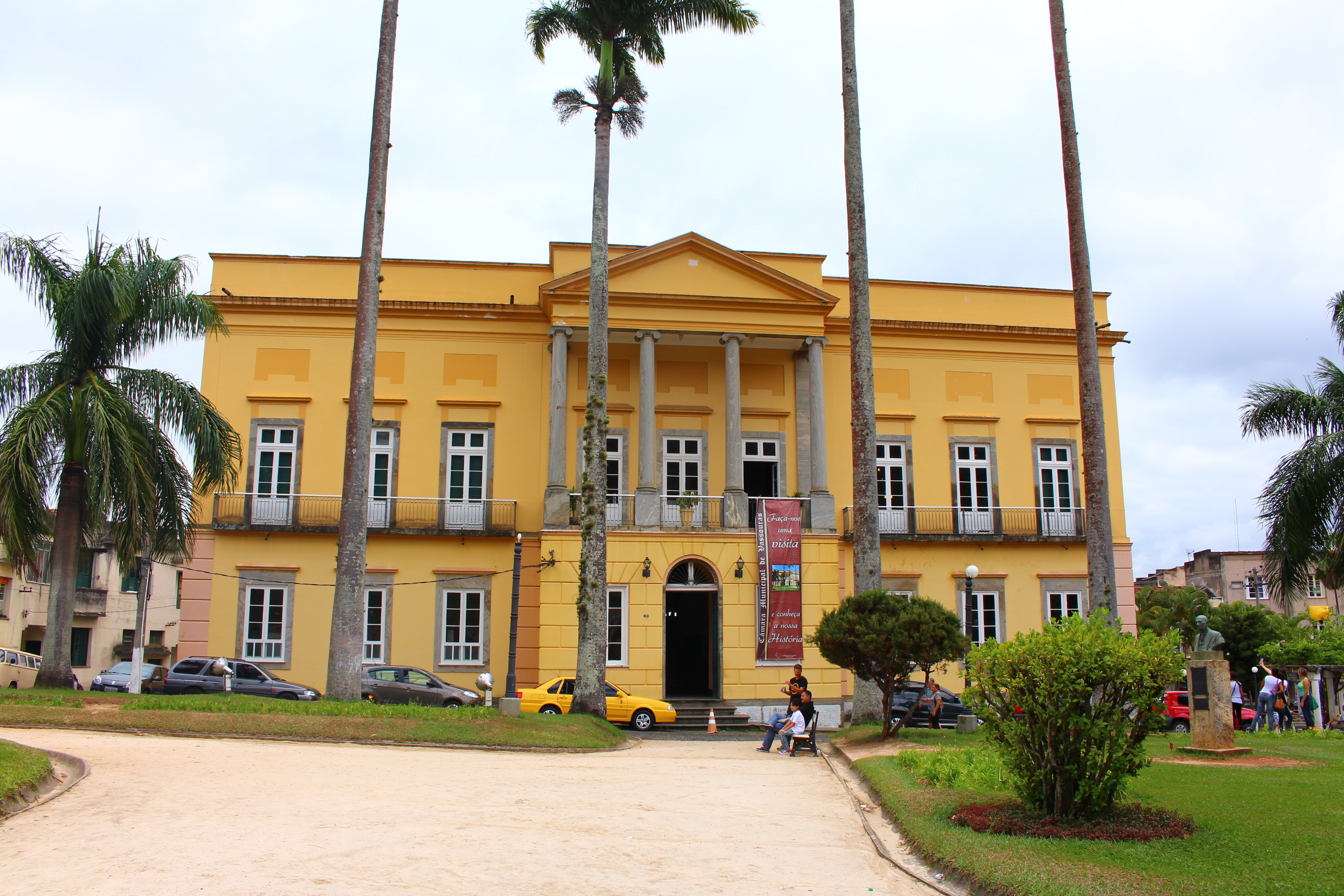
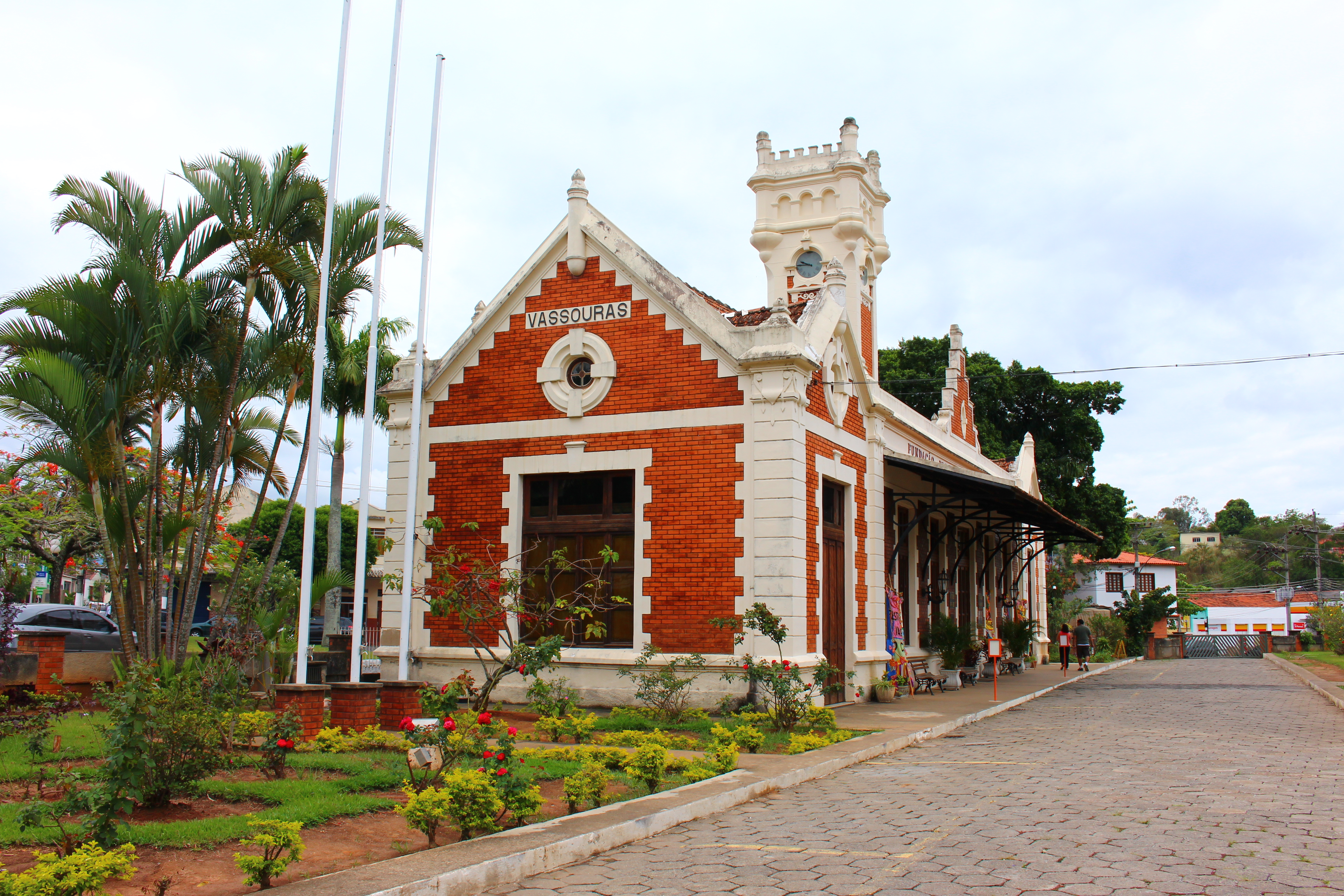
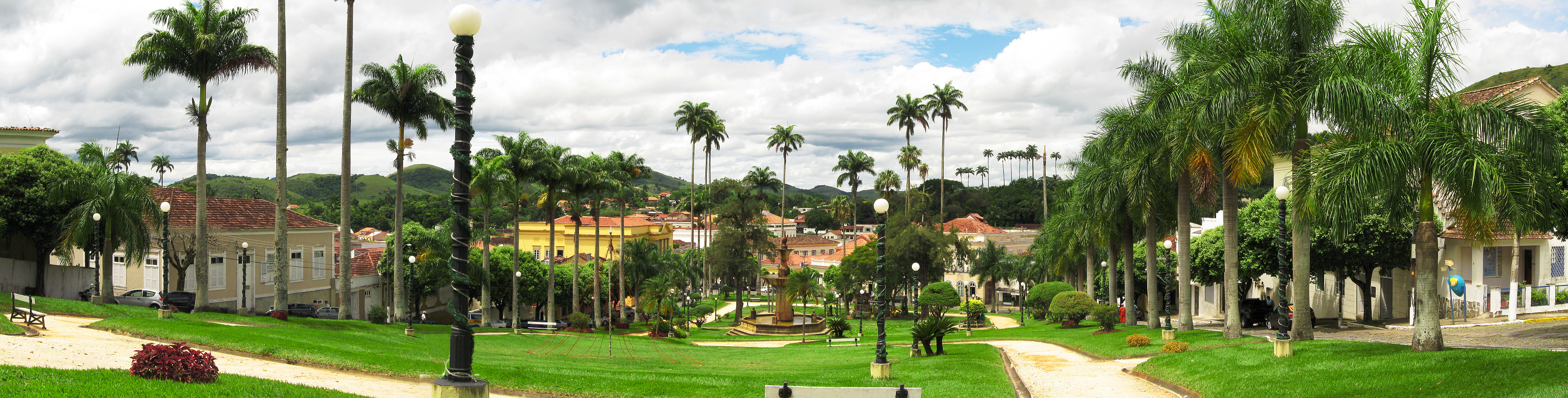

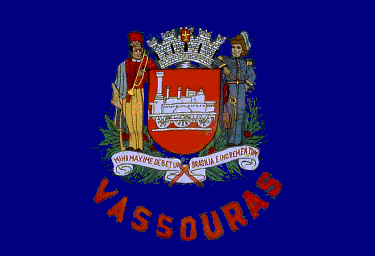
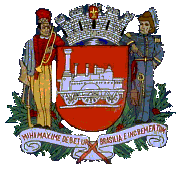
- Flag Coat of arms
- Motto: "Mihi maxime debetur Brasiliae incrementum"
- Location in Rio de Janeiro
- Coordinates: 22°24′14″S 43°39′46″W
- Country: Brazil
- Region: Southeast
- State: Rio de Janeiro
- Founded: 15 January 1833

Government
  - Mayor: Rosi Silva (PP) (2025-2029)

Area
  - Total: 552.438 km^{2} (213.298 sq mi)
- Elevation: 434 m (1,424 ft)

Population (2020)
  - Total: 37,083
  - Density: 67.126/km^{2} (173.86/sq mi)
- Time zone: UTC−3 (BRT)
- HDI (2010): 0.714 – high
- Website: vassouras.rj.gov.br

Vassouras (Portuguese: [vɐˈsowɾɐs], lit. 'Brooms') is a municipality located in the Brazilian state of Rio de Janeiro. Its population was 37,083 (2020) and its area is 552 km^{2} (213 sq mi).

Vassouras was the setting for the Bangu neighborhood portrayed in the 1970 Brazilian film My Sweet Orange Tree, as well as the fictional town of "Florença" depicted in the 2001 miniseries Presença de Anita.
