= House of Orléans-Braganza =

Brazilian imperial house

House of Orléans-Braganza Casa de Orléans e Bragança
- Parent house: House of Orléans; Brazilian imperial family (House of Braganza)
- Country: Brazil; France
- Founded: 1864; 162 years ago
- Founder: Isabel of Braganza, Princess Imperial of Brazil and Prince Gaston of Orleans, Count of Eu
- Current head: Vassouras branch: Prince Bertrand of Orléans-Braganza; Petrópolis branch: Prince Pedro Carlos of Orléans-Braganza
- Titles: Prince Imperial of Brazil; Prince of Grão-Pará; Prince of Brazil; Prince of Orléans-Braganza
- Estate: Brazil

The House of Orléans-Braganza (Portuguese: Casa de Orléans e Bragança) is, by dynastic legitimacy, the imperial house of Brazil. It was established in 1864 following the marriage of Princess Isabel of Braganza, heiress presumptive to the Brazilian throne, to Prince Gaston of Orléans, Count of Eu. (Note: Under agnatic primogeniture, the house constitutes a cadet branch of the House of Orléans.) Through this union, the Brazilian branch of the House of Braganza became genealogically linked to the French royal House of Orléans.

Although the House of Orléans-Braganza never reigned, its members became the legitimate successors to the Brazilian imperial throne after the overthrow of the monarchy in 1889, when Emperor Pedro II, the last reigning monarch of the House of Braganza, was deposed in a military coup led by republican factions. Upon the death of Princess Isabel in 1921—the last Brazilian monarch born into the Braganza dynasty—her descendants inherited the dynastic rights and claims of the imperial House of Braganza to the now-defunct Brazilian throne.

The headship of the House of Orléans-Braganza is currently disputed between two branches of the imperial family: the Petrópolis branch, headed by Pedro Carlos of Orléans-Braganza, the agnatic senior member of the house, and the Vassouras branch, headed by Bertrand of Orléans-Braganza. This division originates from the contested validity of the 1908 renunciation of dynastic rights by Pedro de Alcântara, Prince of Grão-Pará, grandfather of the head of the Petrópolis branch. Supporters of the Vassouras branch argue that these rights instead passed to his younger brother, Luís, Prince Imperial of Brazil, grandfather of the current head of that line.

== History ==
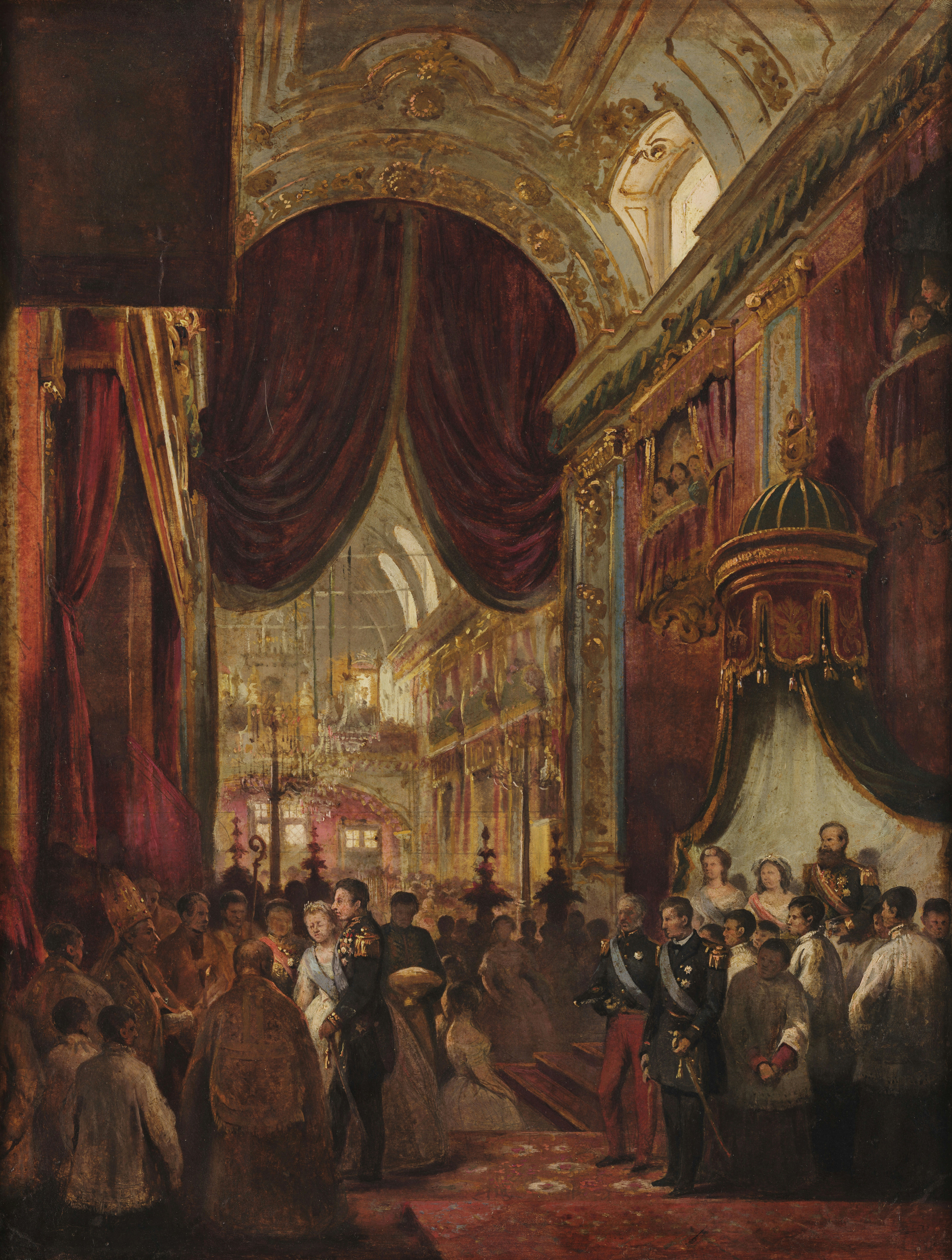
Wedding of Princess Isabel of Braganza and Prince Gaston of Orléans in the Imperial Chapel, 15 October 1864.

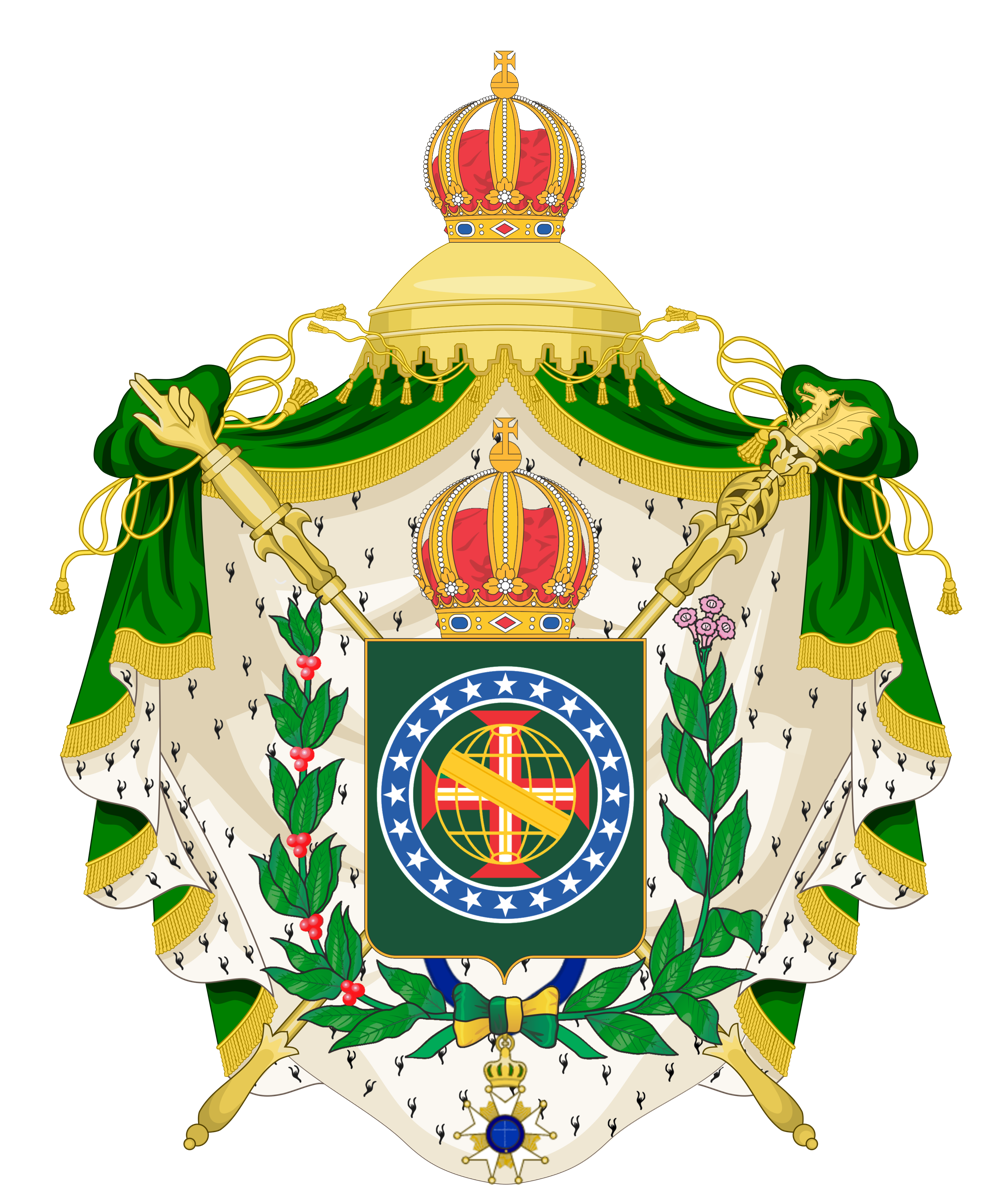
Imperial Coat of Arms

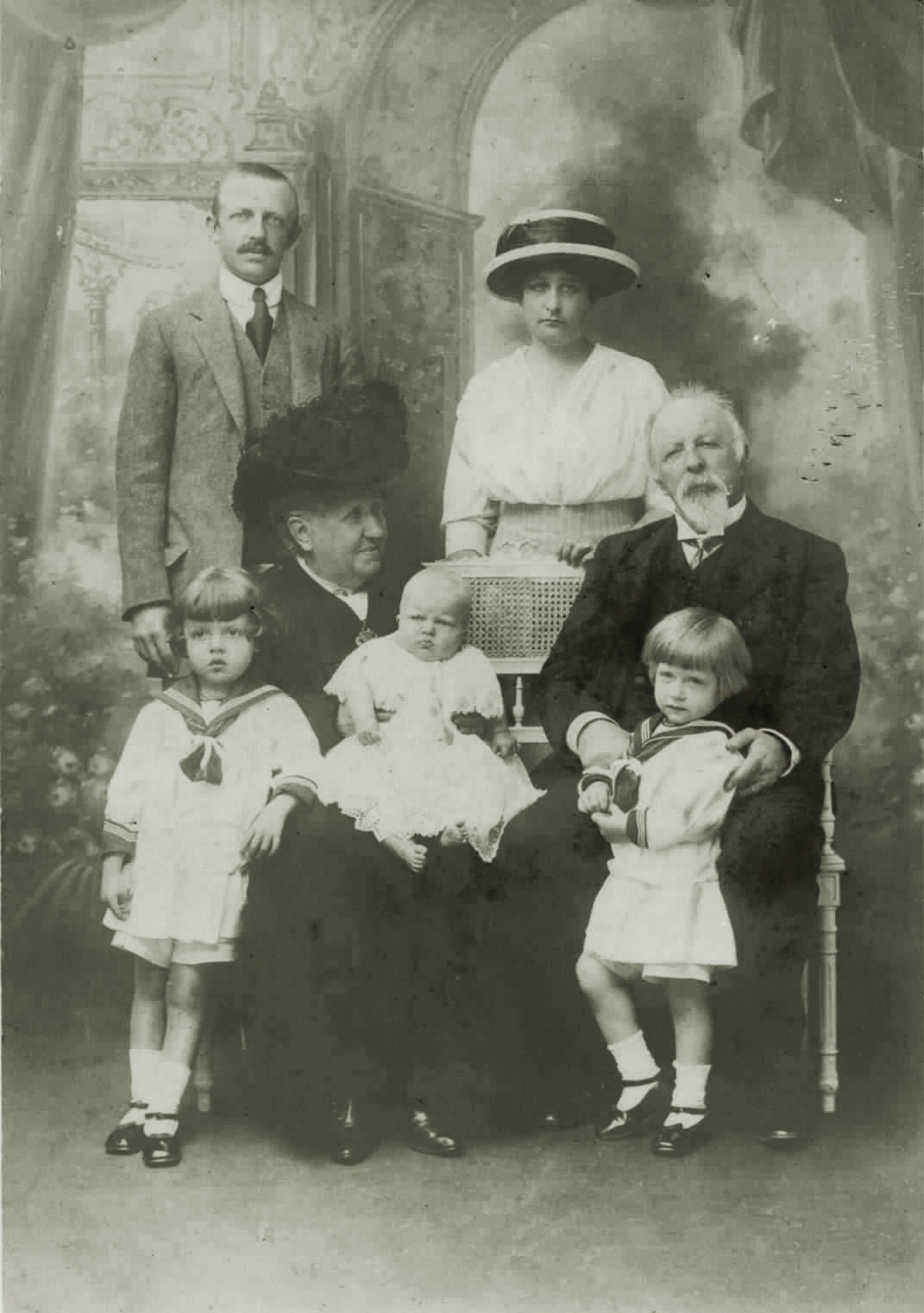
Isabel and Gaston with their son Prince Luís, his wife Princess Maria di Grazia, and children in the Château d'Eu, the residence of the Brazilian imperial family during the exile, 1913

In 1864, Emperor Pedro II of Brazil was looking for a match to his daughters. The Emperor's sister, the Princess of Joinville suggested her nephews, Prince Gaston, Count of Eu, and Prince Ludwig August of Saxe-Coburg and Gotha, both grandsons of King Louis Philippe of France, as suitable choices for the imperial princesses. The two young men traveled to Brazil in August 1864 so that the prospective brides and grooms could meet before a final agreement to the marriage. Isabel and Leopoldina were not informed until Gaston and Ludwig August were mid-Atlantic. Arriving in early September, Gaston described the princesses as "ugly", but thought Isabel less so than her sister. For her part, Isabel in her own words "began to feel a great and tender love" for Gaston. The two couples: Gaston and Isabel; Ludwig August and Leopoldina; were engaged on 18 September. On 15 October 1864 at Rio de Janeiro, Prince Gaston married Isabel, Princess Imperial of Brazil and heiress to the Brazilian throne.

It was from that marriage the royal house of Orléans-Braganza was formed. The couple had 3 surviving sons which were the first to use the surname Orléans-Braganza: Pedro de Alcântara, Prince of Grão-Pará, Prince Luís, and Prince Antônio. Both Prince Pedro and Prince Luís have children.

Today they are the present claimants to the throne of the former Empire of Brazil, which became extinct with the Brazilian proclamation of the republic, on 15 November 1889 after a military coup d'état headed by Marshall Deodoro da Fonseca, the 1st President of Brazil. After the death of Princess Isabel on 1921, the House of Orléans-Braganza became the claimant of the Brazilian throne under Prince Pedro Henrique of Orléans-Braganza.

=== Exile ===
On 15 November 1889 a republican coup d'état took place in Rio de Janeiro deposing the old Emperor Pedro II and proclaiming the exile of the Brazilian Imperial Family. The imperial family arrived in Lisbon on 7 December 1889. The Orleans-Braganza family moved to southern Spain. Further bad news came from Brazil, as the new government abolished the imperial family's allowances, their only substantial source of income, and declared the family banished. On the back of a large loan from a Portuguese businessman, the imperial family moved into the Hotel Beau Séjour at Cannes.

In early 1890, Princess Isabel and Prince Gaston moved into a private villa, which was far cheaper than the hotel, but the Emperor refused to accompany them and remained at the Beau Séjour, later moving to Paris where he died in 1891. Prince Louis, Duke of Nemours, Gaston's father, provided them with a monthly allowance. By September, they had taken a villa near Versailles and their sons were enrolled in Parisian schools. Isabel and Gaston purchased a villa in Boulogne-sur-Seine, where they lived an essentially quiet life. Attempts by Brazilian monarchists to restore the crown were unsuccessful, and Isabel lent them only half-hearted support. She thought military action unwise and unwelcome. She correctly assumed that it was unlikely to succeed.

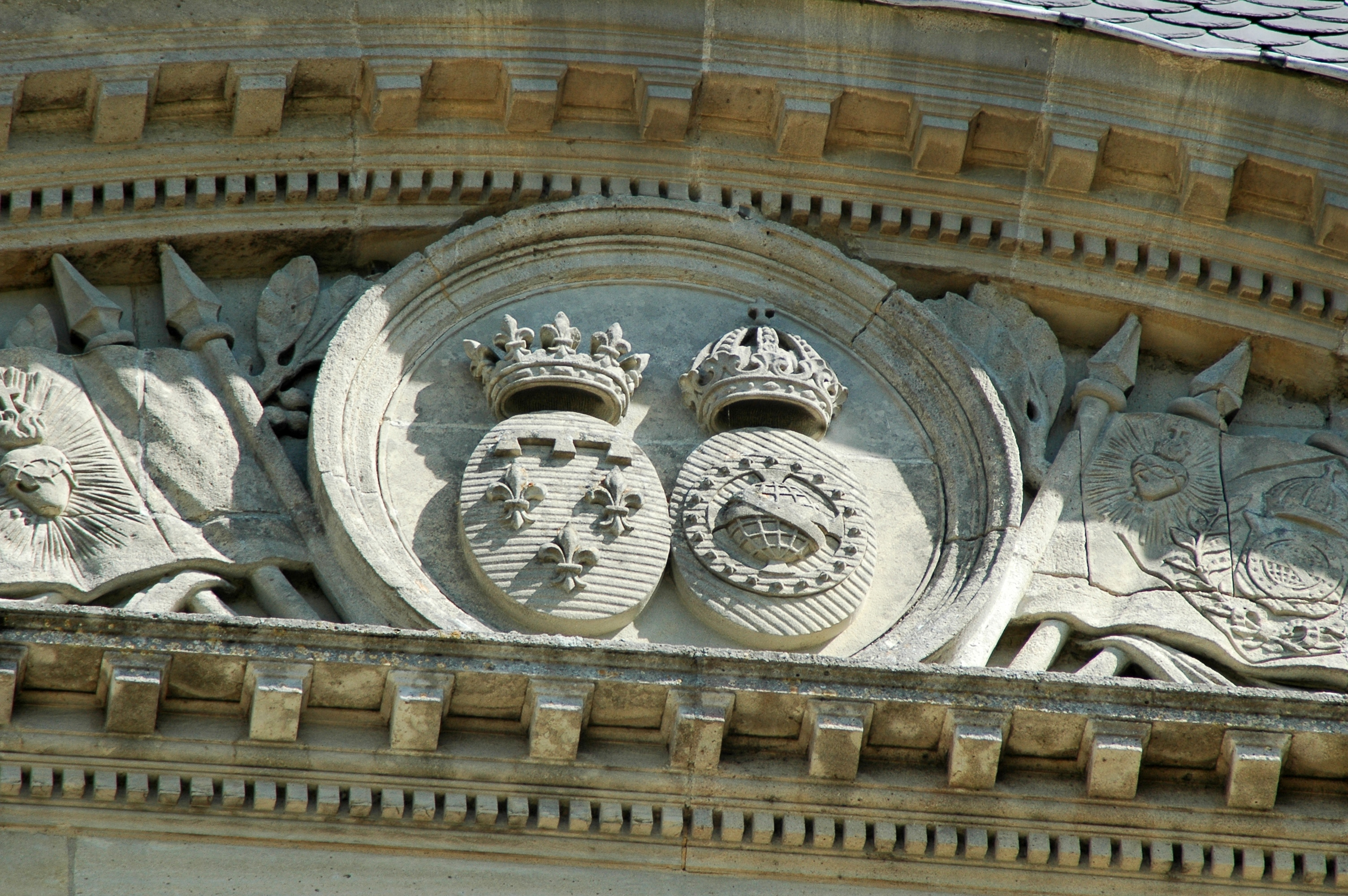
Coats of arms of the House of Orléans-Braganza at the Château d'Eu.

When Gaston's father died in 1896, an inheritance assured him and Isabel financial security. Their three sons enrolled at a military school in Vienna, and Isabel continued her charitable work associated with the Catholic Church. In 1905, Gaston purchased the Château d'Eu in Normandy, the former home of his grandfather King Louis Philippe I and where he was raised, and the couple furnished it with items received from Brazil in the early 1890s.

In 1907, Prince Luís of Orléans-Braganza, Isabel and Gaston's second son, planned an ambitious project to defy the decree banishing the imperial family from Brazil by traveling to Rio de Janeiro. His sudden arrival created an uproar in the old imperial capital because the arrival was widely circulated in newspapers. It also caused difficulties for Brazilian politicians by placing the imperial family at the center of attention and many Brazilians went to welcome him. However, Luís was prevented from disembarking and was not allowed to set foot on his native land by the republican government. Nonetheless, he sent his mother a telegram saying: "Hindered of disembarking by the Government, I greet the Redeemer of Slaves on the bay of Guanabara in the eve of May 13."

Next year, following the announcement of imminent, morganatic marriage between his older brother Pedro de Alcântara, Prince of Grão-Pará and Countess Elizabeth Dobrženský von Dobrženitz, Prince Luís, who assumed the title of Prince Imperial of Brazil, became the heir and married Princess Maria di Grazia of Bourbon-Two Sicilies, his cousin. Both couples had many children. Prince Antônio Gastão of Orléans-Braganza didn't marry.

Soon before the World War I, Princes Luis and Antônio, members of the Austro-Hungarian Army with the permission of their uncle-grandpa, Emperor Franz Joseph, disconnected from the military. With the war, they tried to enlist the French Army to protect the fatherland of their father, which they adopted but they both was denied because they were part of the French Royal Family. The Princes then joined the British armed forces. Prince Antônio died in 1918, soon after the end of the war in an airplane crash. The serious illness contracted in the trenches proved resistant to all treatments and his health gradually deteriorated until the death of Prince Luis 1920.

In 1920, the republican government headed by President Epitácio Pessoa lifted the imperial family's banishment. The next year Prince Gaston and Prince Pedro de Alcântara traveled back to Brazil after 31 years of imposed exile for the reburial of the Emperor and the Empress in Cathedral of Petrópolis. Isabel, the Emperor's daughter and heir and de jure Empress of Brazil was too ill to travel and died in this same year. She was the last pure Braganza heir to the Brazilian throne. After her death, the claim passed to her grandson Prince Pedro Henrique of Orléans-Braganza, Luis's eldest son. The following year, Prince Gaston, Count of Eu, eventually died a natural death during a journey that would take him back to Brazil to celebrate the first centenary of the country's independence.

While the rest of the Imperial Family remain living in France, in the early 1930s, Prince Pedro acquired the Grão Pará Palace, a former palace of his family, and moved to Petrópolis, back in Brazil. At the time, his eldest daughter Princess Isabelle of Orléans-Braganza married Henri, Count of Paris, heir to the French throne. Prince Pedro died in 1940 in his palace, being the only Prince of Brazil to die back in his fatherland. His other daughter Princess Maria Francisca of Orléans-Braganza married Duarte Nuno, Duke of Braganza, heir to the Portuguese throne in 1942.

In 1937, the son of Luís, Prince Pedro Henrique, marries Princess Maria Elisabeth of Bavaria, granddaughter of Ludwig III, the last King of Bavaria in Germany. They fled the country to avoid the Nazis and went to live in a palace in France where they start to have children. The couple moved to Brazil in 1945 soon after the end of the war giving a definite end to the exile.

=== Renunciation and Division ===
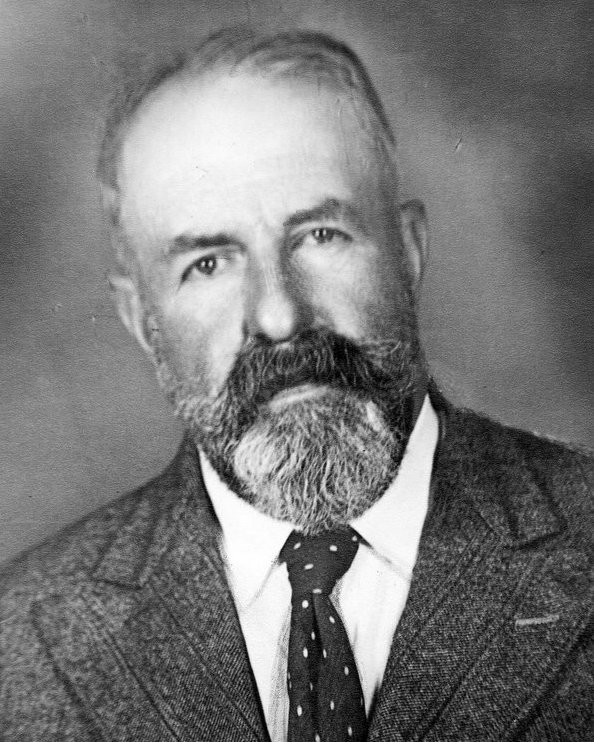
Pedro de Alcântara, Prince of Grão-Pará, styled Prince Imperial of Brazil from the death of his grandfather Pedro II in 1891, to his renunciation in 1908. He was again styled as Prince of Grão-Pará for life.

In 1908, Pedro de Alcântara, Prince of Grão-Pará wanted to marry Countess Elizabeth Dobrženský von Dobrženitz(1875–1951) who, although a noblewoman of the Kingdom of Bohemia, did not belong to a royal or reigning dynasty. Although the constitution of the Brazilian Empire did not require a dynast to marry equally, his mother ruled that the marriage would not be valid dynastically for the Brazilian succession, and as a result he renounced his rights to the throne of Brazil on 30 October 1908: To solemnize this, Dom Pedro, aged thirty-three, signed the document translated here:

I Prince Pedro de Alcântara Luiz Filipe Maria Gastão Miguel Gabriel Rafael Gonzaga of Orléans-Braganza, having maturely reflected, have resolved to renounce the right that, by the Constitution of the Empire of Brazil, promulgated on 25 March 1824, accords to me the Crown of that nation. I declare, therefore, that by my free and spontaneous will I hereby renounce, in my own name, as well as for any and all of my descendants, to all and any rights that the aforesaid Constitution confers upon us to the Brazilian Crown and Throne, which shall pass to the lines which follow mine, conforming to the order of succession as established by article 117. Before God I promise, for myself and my descendants, to hold to the present declaration. Cannes 30 October 1908 signed: Pedro de Alcântara of Orléans-Braganza

This renunciation was followed by a letter from Isabel to royalists in Brazil:

9 November 1908, [Castle of] Eu

Most Excellent Gentlemen Members of the Monarchist Directory,

With all my heart I thank you for the congratulations upon the marriages of my dear children Pedro and Luiz. Luis's took place in Cannes on the 4th with the brilliance that is desired for so solemn an act in the life of my successor to the Throne of Brazil. I was very pleased. Pedro's shall take place next on the 14th. Before the marriage of Luis he signed his resignation to the crown of Brazil, and here I send it to you, while keeping here an identical copy. I believe that this news must be published as soon as possible (you gentlemen shall do it in the way that you judge to be most satisfactory) in order to prevent the formation of parties that would be a great evil for our country. Pedro will continue to love his homeland, and will give all possible support to his brother. Thank God they are very united. Luis will engage actively in everything with respect to the monarchy and any good for our land. However, without giving up my rights I want that he be up to date on everything so that he may prepare himself for the position which with all my heart I desire that one day he will hold. You may write to him as many times as you may want to so that he shall be informed of everything. My strength is not the same as it once was, but my heart is still the same to love my homeland and all those who are so dedicated to us. I give you all my friendship and confidence,

a) Isabel, comtesse d'Eu

After Prince Pedro's renunciation, he lost every royal title he had and his dynastic rights as heir of his mother passed to his brother, Prince Luís of Orléans-Braganza, who became Prince Imperial of Brazil. However, years later, after Pedro's death in 1940, his eldest son Pedro Gastão of Orléans-Braganza did not accept his father's resignation and again claimed the Brazilian throne in conflict with Prince Pedro Henrique of Orléans-Braganza, son and heir of Prince Luís, dead in 1920. Thus began a dispute for the crown of Brazil. The descendants of Prince Pedro became known as the Petrópolis branch, and the descendants of Prince Luís as the Vassouras branch.

=== The Family Pact of 1909 ===
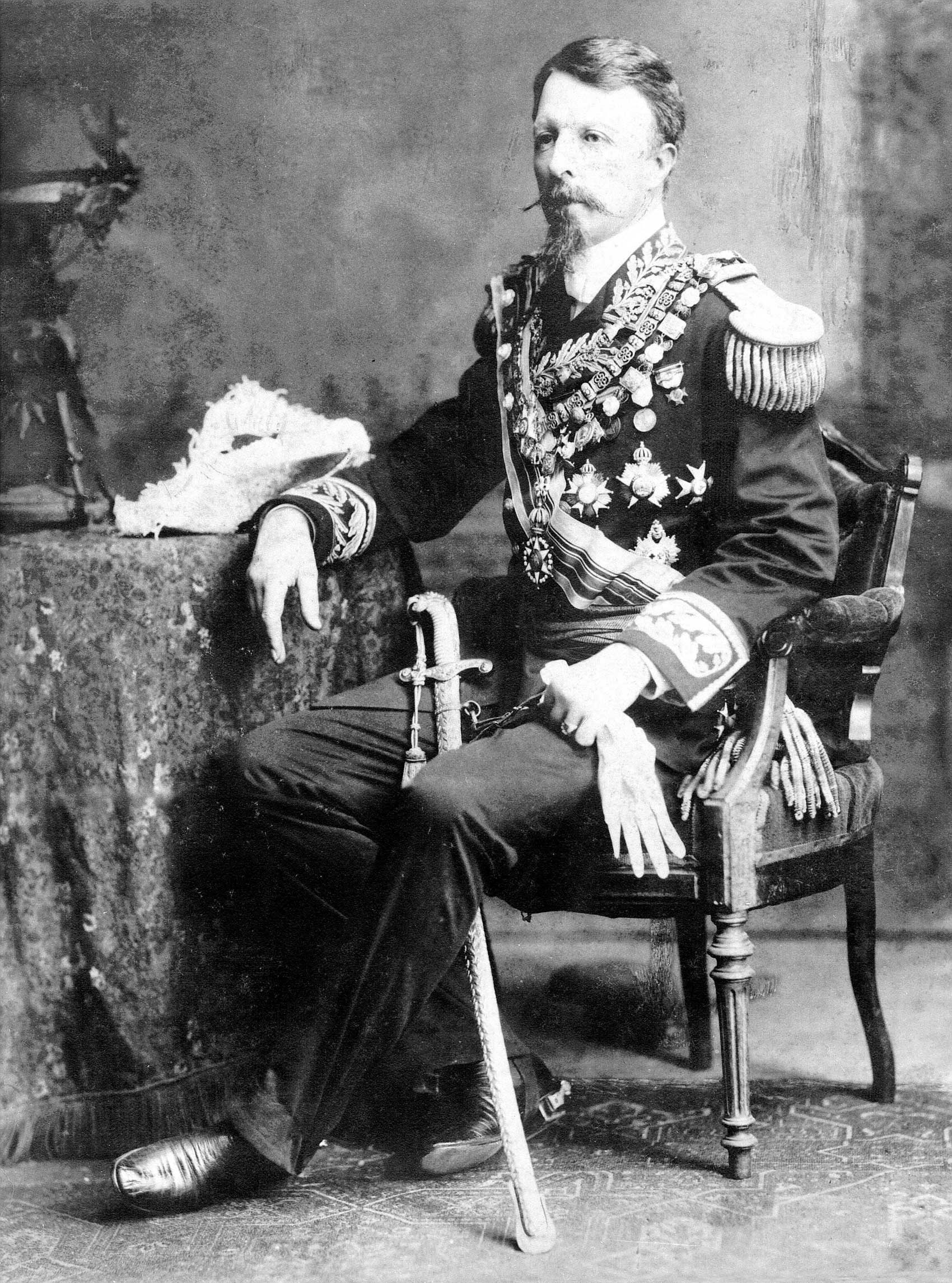
Prince Gaston of Orléans, Count of Eu and Prince Imperial consort of Brazil

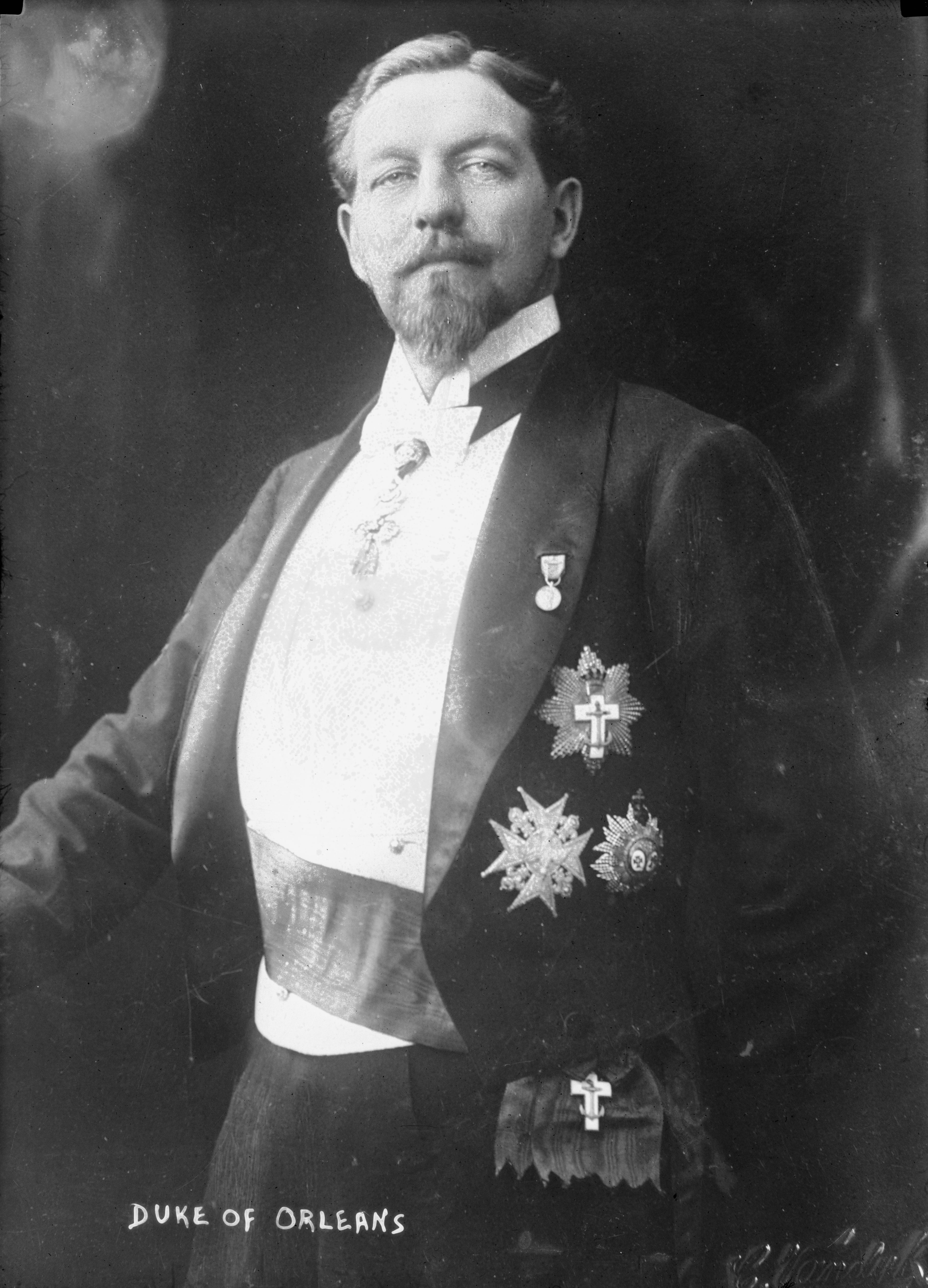
Prince Philippe of Orléans, Duke of Orléans and Head of the House of Orléans

After the resignation of Pedro de Alcântara, Prince of Grão-Pará on 1908 to marry a Bohemian noblewoman, he lost his rights and his titles as Prince of Brazil. To maintain the princely status, his father, Prince Gaston of Orleans, as former member of the French Royal Family sought the head of this dynasty, Prince Philippe, Duke of Orléans.

Recognizing the principle of pérégrinité and therefore the impossibility for foreign princes to claim the crown of France, the Orléans claimants and their supporters consider excluded from the succession to the throne the foreign descendants of King Louis-Philippe I: the Brazilian Orléans-Braganza (descendants of the Comte d'Eu) and the Spanish Orléans-Galliera (descendants of Antoine, Duke of Montpensier).

The agreement of the family in 1909, known as the "Family Pact" (Pacte de Famille) confirms the exclusion of members of these branches from the succession on grounds of pérégrinité. Further, it "takes note" of a written promise given by the Count of Eu and his son to refrain from asserting any claim to the Crown of France and to the position of Head of the House of France until the total extinction of all the other dynastic branches of the House of France (the Montpensiers were already deemed excluded). According to the pact, the House of France recognized the Brazilian House of Orléans-Braganza as a cadet branch and create to his member the French title of Prince of Orléans-Braganza.

Alfred de Gramont alleged in his diary, L'ami du Prince, journal of a novel, published by Eric Mension Rigau-Fayard in 2011) that this decision was made by the Orléans for two reasons: first, the desire of other dynasts to exclude the Comte d'Eu and the princes of Orléans-Braganza (who became heirs presumptive to the Empire of Brazil), and second, the influence of French nationalism. However, exclusion from the succession as a consequence of permanent emigration to Brazil had been acknowledged and accepted in writing by the Count of Eu prior to his marriage to the Princess Imperial of Brazil.

== Members ==
The list below includes members of the House.

- Emperor Dom Pedro II (1825–1891), last monarch of the Empire of Brazil
  - Afonso, Prince Imperial (1845–1847)
  - Dona Isabel, Princess Imperial (1846–1921)
    - Pedro de Alcântara, Prince of Grão-Pará (1875–1940) – See Petrópolis line
    - Prince Luís (1878–1920) – See Vassouras line
    - Prince Antônio (1881–1918)
  - Princess Leopoldina (1847–1871), Princess of Saxe-Coburg and Gotha, Duchess of Saxony
  - Pedro Afonso, Prince Imperial (1848–1850)

=== Vassouras line ===
- Prince Luís (1878–1920), the second son of Princess Isabel
  - Prince Pedro Henrique (1909–1981), he became Head of the Imperial House of Brazil after death of Princess Isabel.
    - Prince Dom Luiz (1938–2022)
    - Prince Eudes (1939–2020): Renounced his rights of succession to the Brazilian Throne in 1966.
    - Prince Dom Bertrand (born 1941)
    - Princess Isabel (1944–2017)
    - Prince Pedro de Alcântara (b. 1945): Renounced his rights in 1972.
    - Prince Fernando (b. 1948): Renounced his rights in 1972.
    - Prince Dom Antônio (1950–2024)
      - Prince Dom Pedro Luiz (1983–2009)
      - Princess Amélia (b. 1984): Renounced her rights in 2014.
      - (1) Prince Dom Rafael (b. 1986)
      - Princess Maria Gabriela (b. 1989)
    - Princess Eleonora (b. 1953), Princess of Ligne
    - Prince Francisco (b. 1955): Renounced his rights in 1980.
    - Prince Alberto (b. 1957): Renounced his rights in 1982.
    - Princess Maria Teresa (b. 1959): Renounced her rights in 1995.
    - Princess Maria Gabriela (b. 1959): Renounced her rights in 2003.
  - Prince Luís Gastão (1911–1931)
  - Princess Pia Maria (1913–2000)

=== Petrópolis line ===
- Pedro de Alcântara, Prince of Grão-Pará (1875–1940), the first son of Princess Isabel, had renounced all rights to the Brazilian Throne for himself and his descendants. The validity of the renunciation was disputed by his son Dom Pedro Gastão after his death.
  - Prince Dom Pedro Gastão (1913–2007)
    - Prince Dom Pedro Carlos (born 1945): He doesn't put in question the validity of the renunciation. Contrariwise, he declared himself a republican.
      - (1) Prince Dom Pedro Thiago (b. 1979)
      - Prince Dom Filipe Rodrigo (b. 1982)
    - Princess Maria da Glória (b. 1946), Duchess of Segorbe, former Crown Princess of Yugoslavia.
    - Prince Alfonso Duarte (b. 1948)
    - Prince Manuel Álvaro (b. 1949)
    - Princess Cristina Maria (b. 1950), Princess Sapieha-Rozánski
    - Prince Francisco Humberto (b. 1956)
  - Princess Isabelle (1911–2003), Countess of Paris.
  - Princess Maria Francisca (1914–1968), Duchess of Braganza.
  - Prince João Maria (1916–2005).
    - Prince João Henrique (b. 1954).
  - Princess Teresa Teodora (1919–2011).

== Genealogy ==
Genealogical tree of the House of Orléans-Braganza, from its origin to the current claimants:

=== Vassouras line ===
The descendants of Prince Luís of Orléans-Braganza

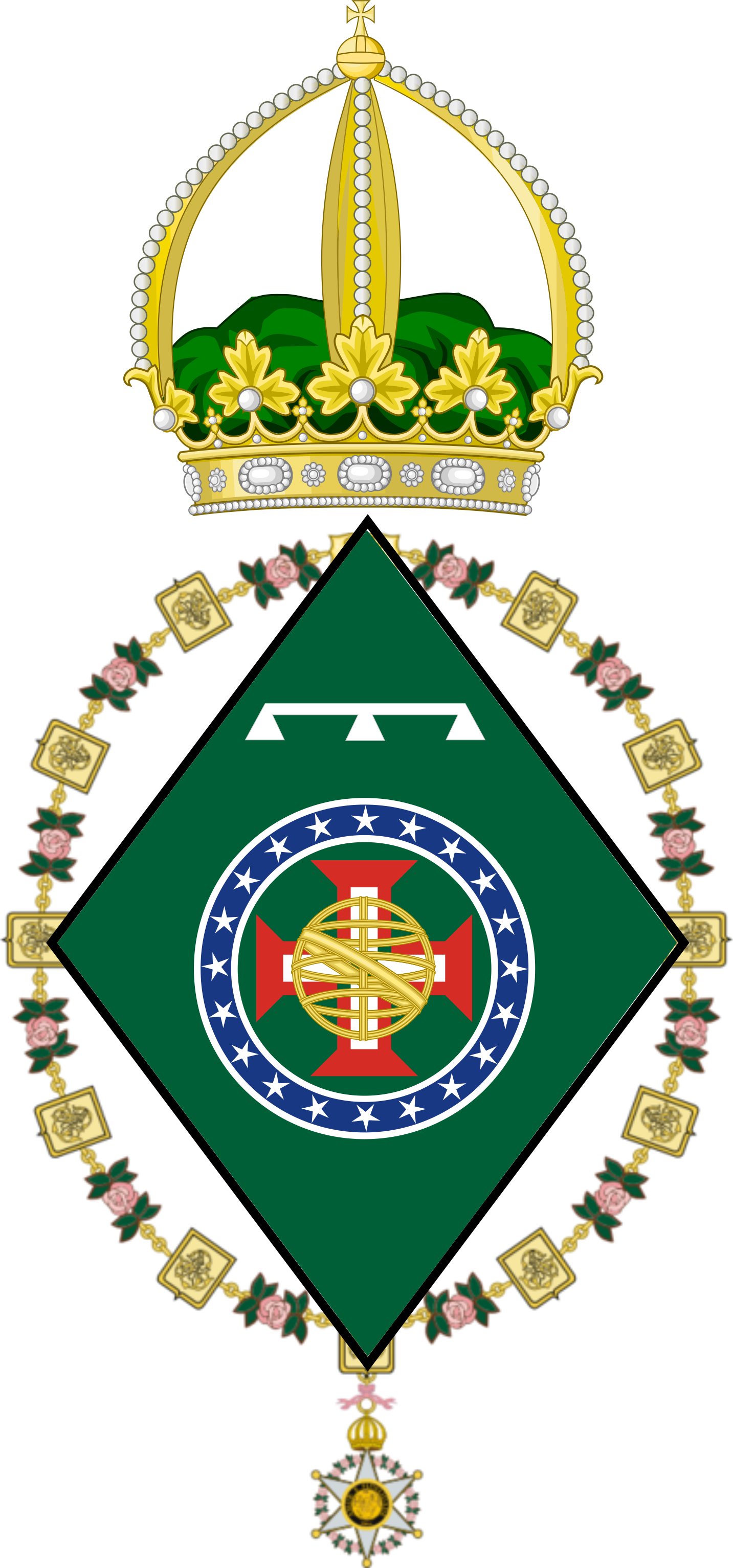
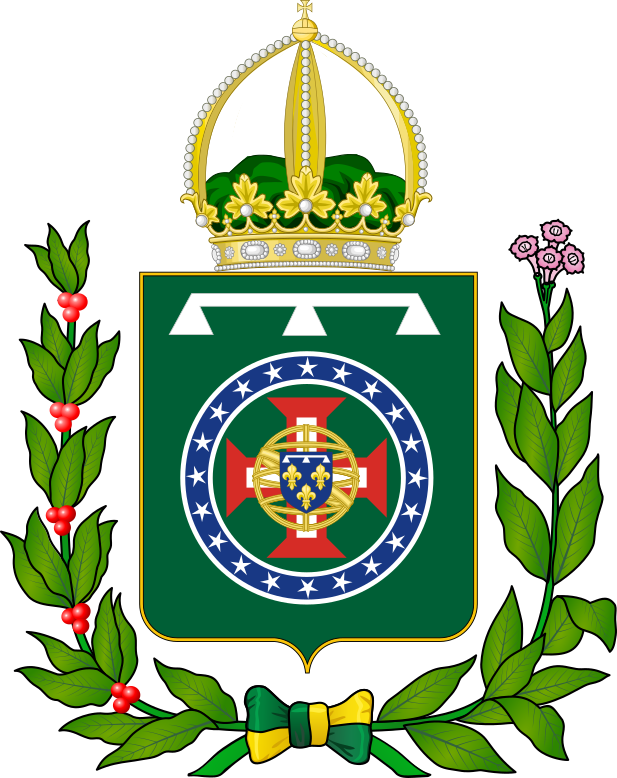
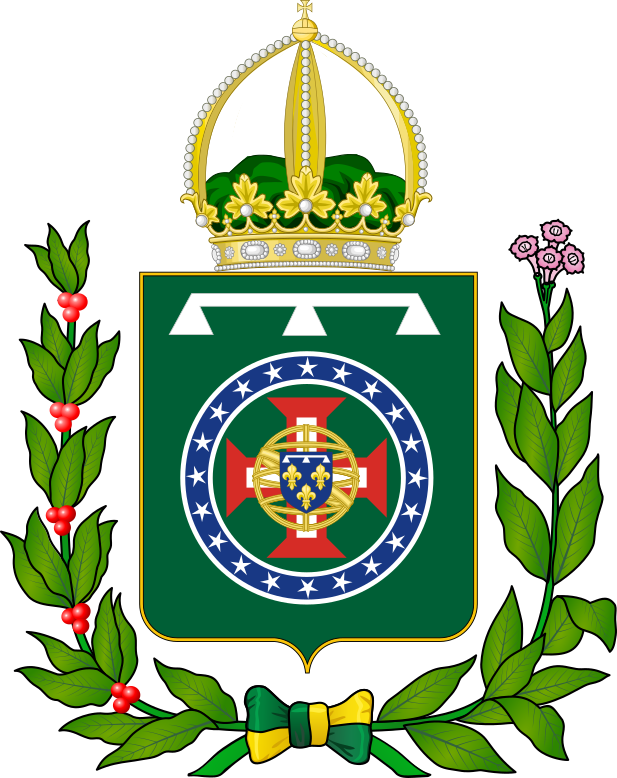
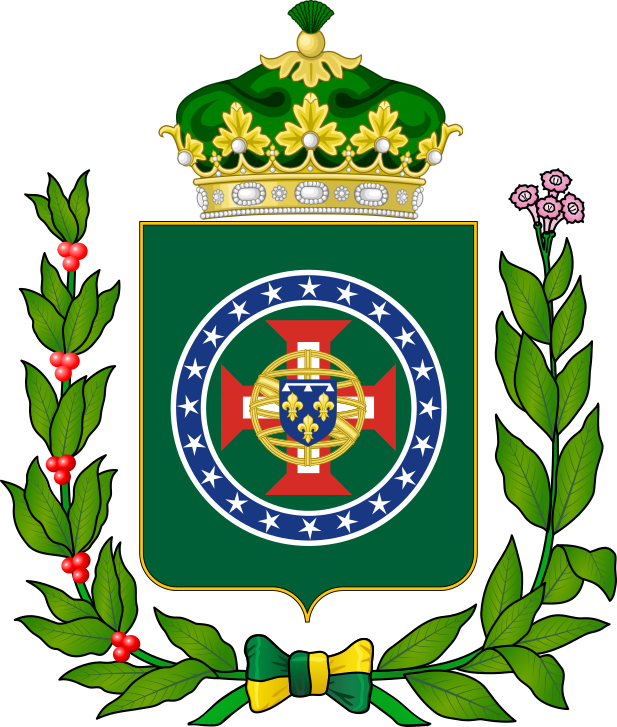
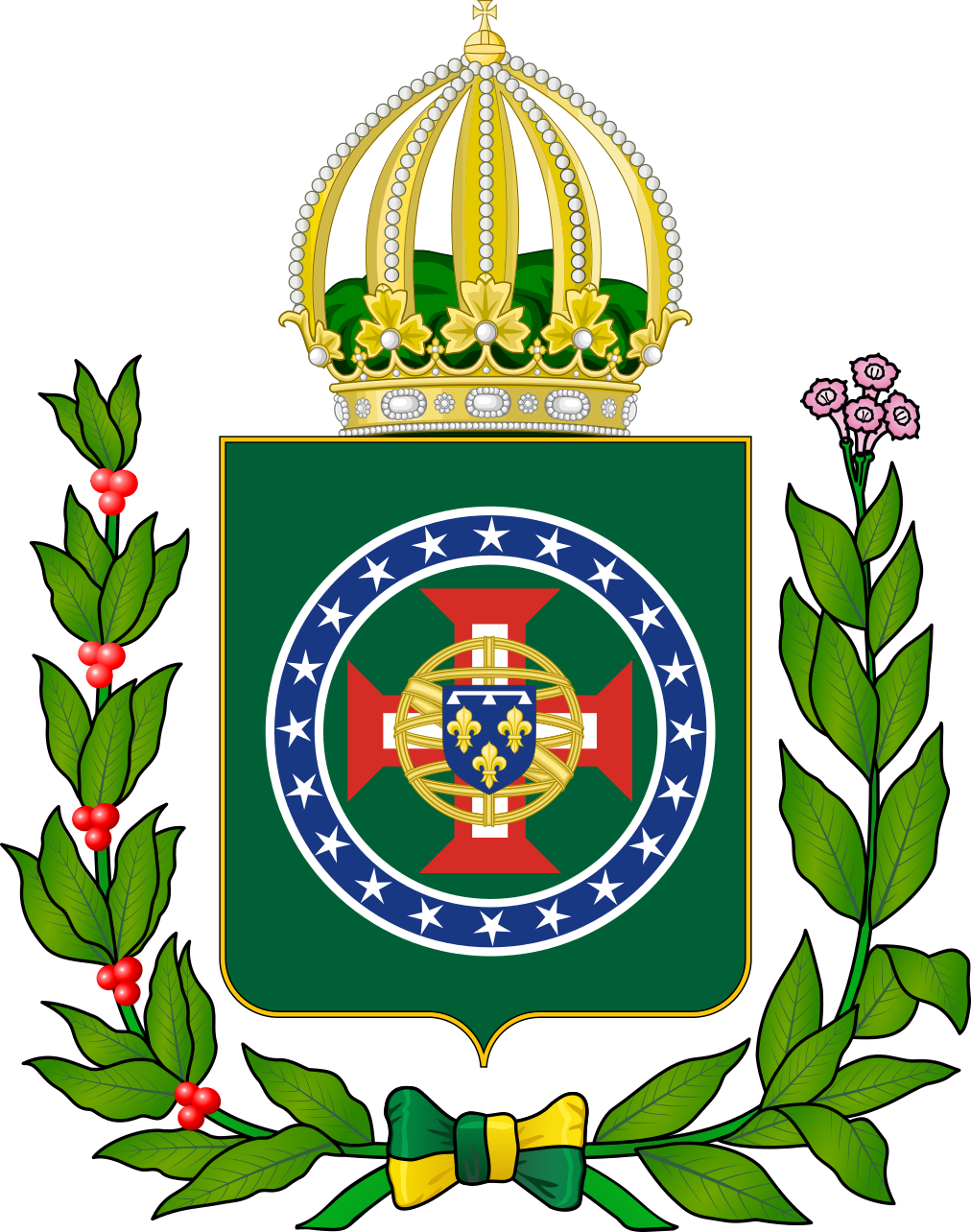
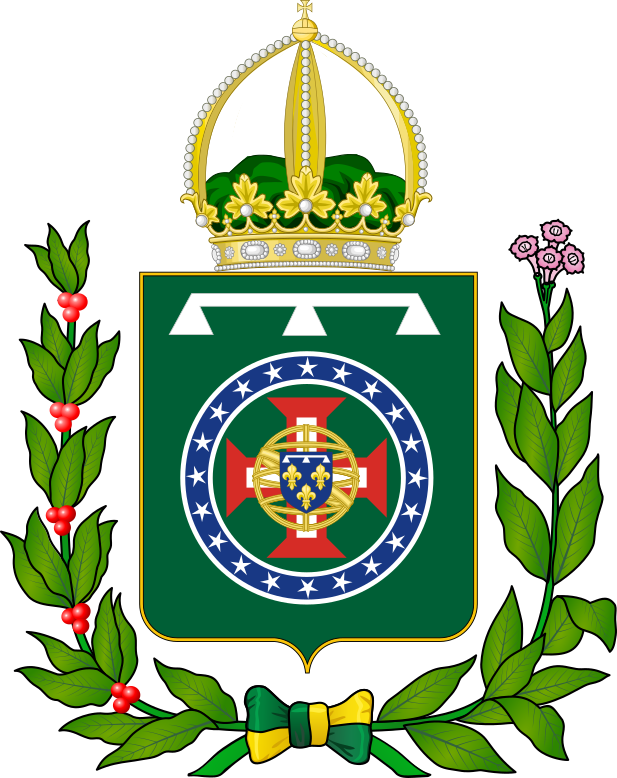
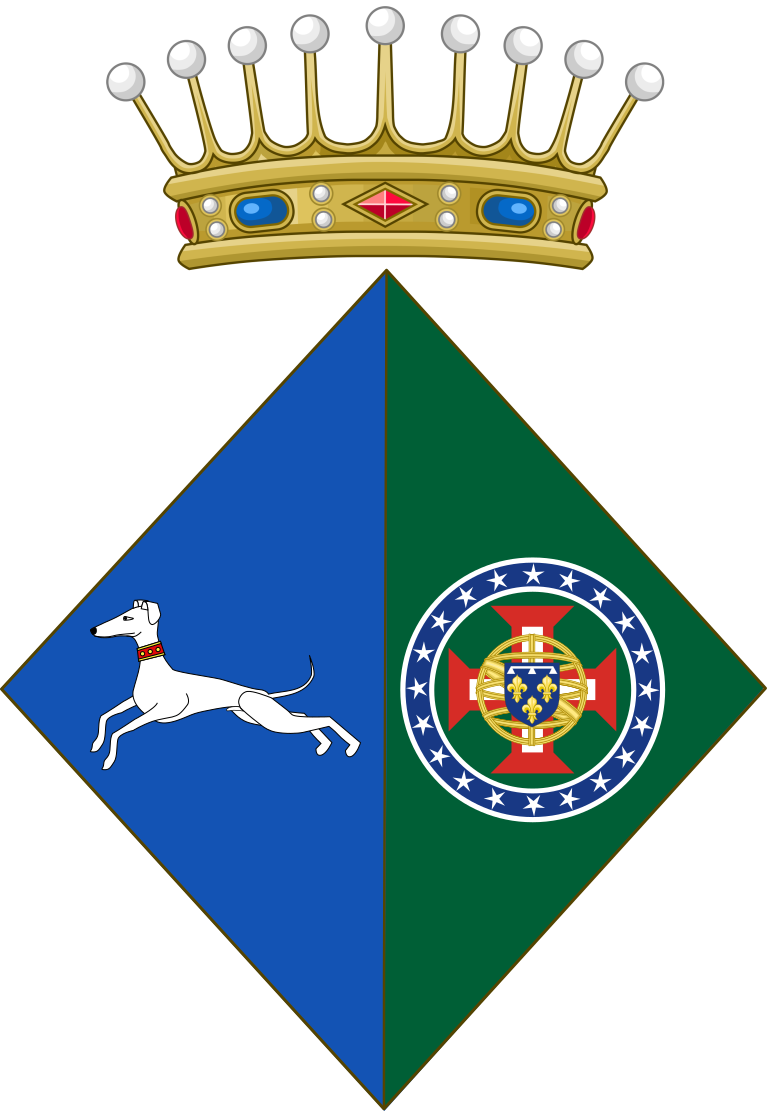
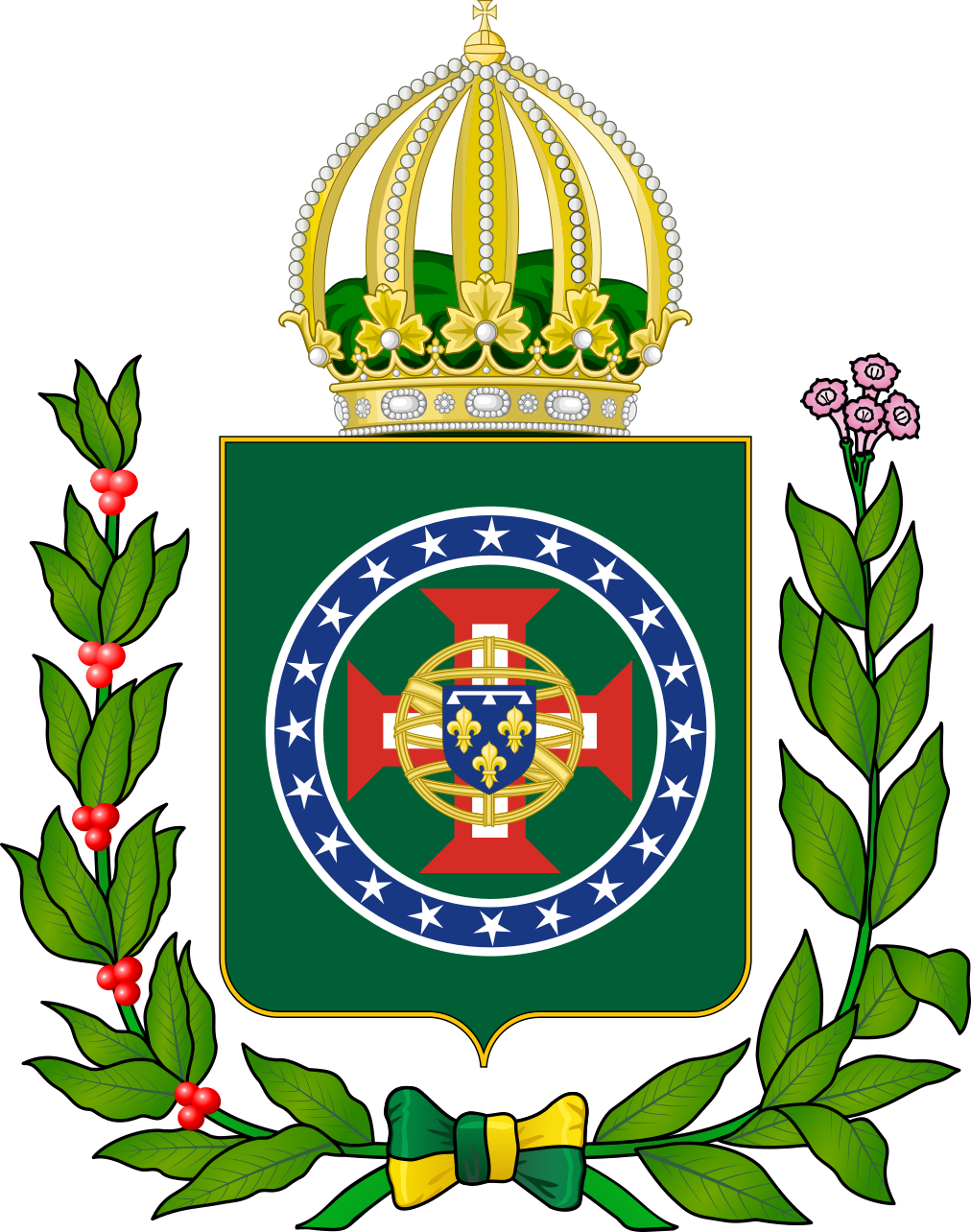
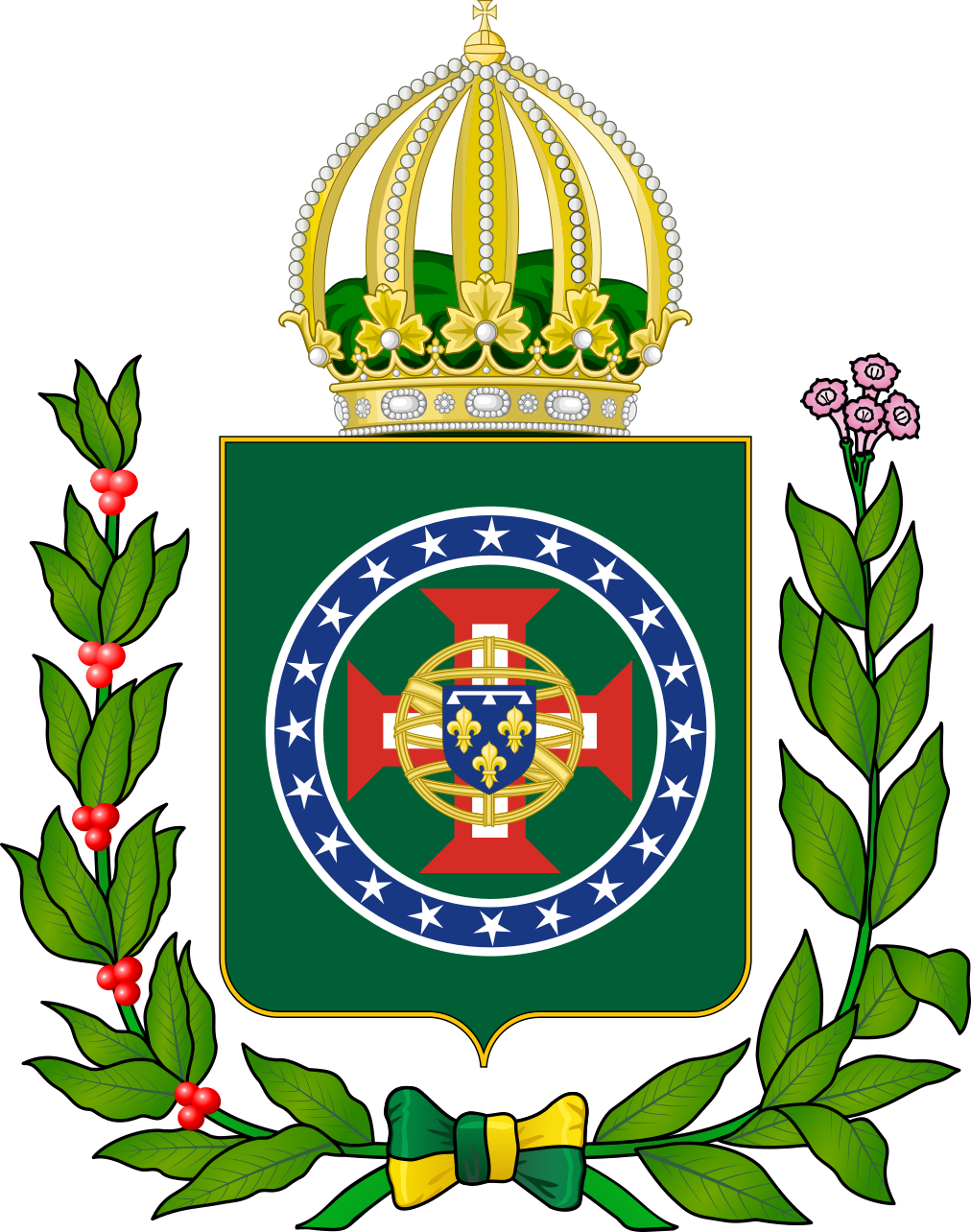
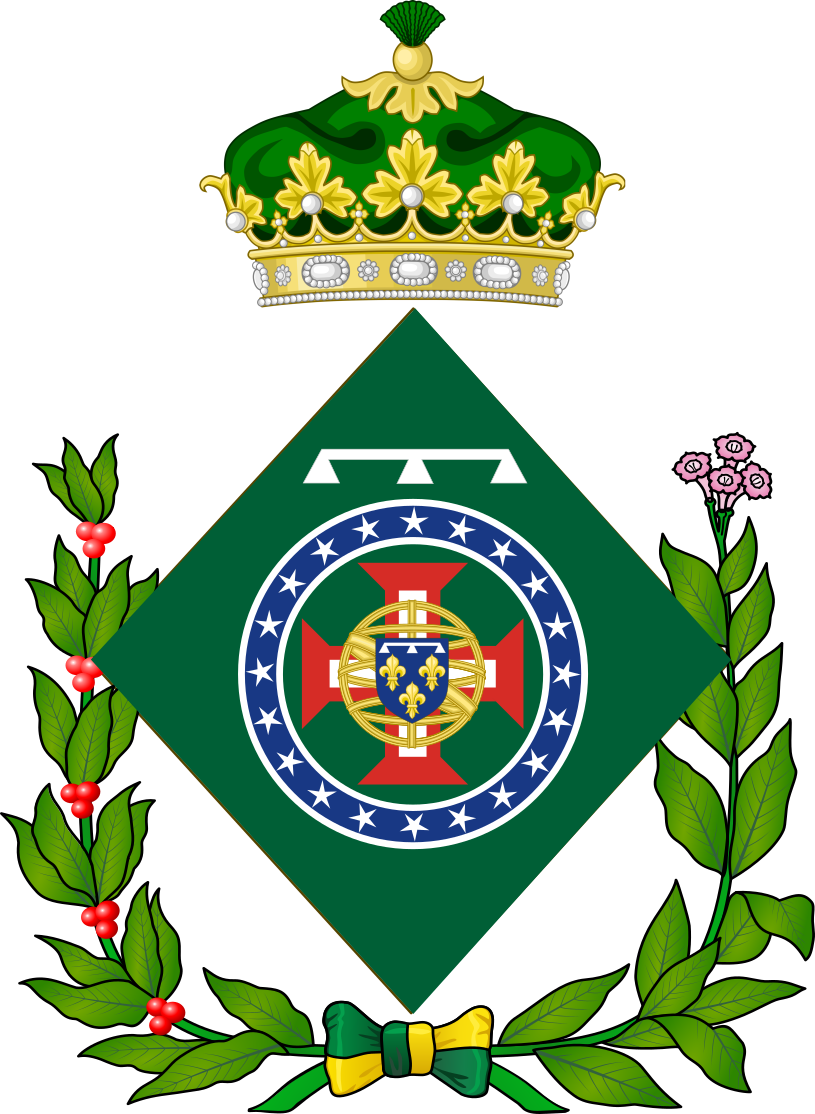
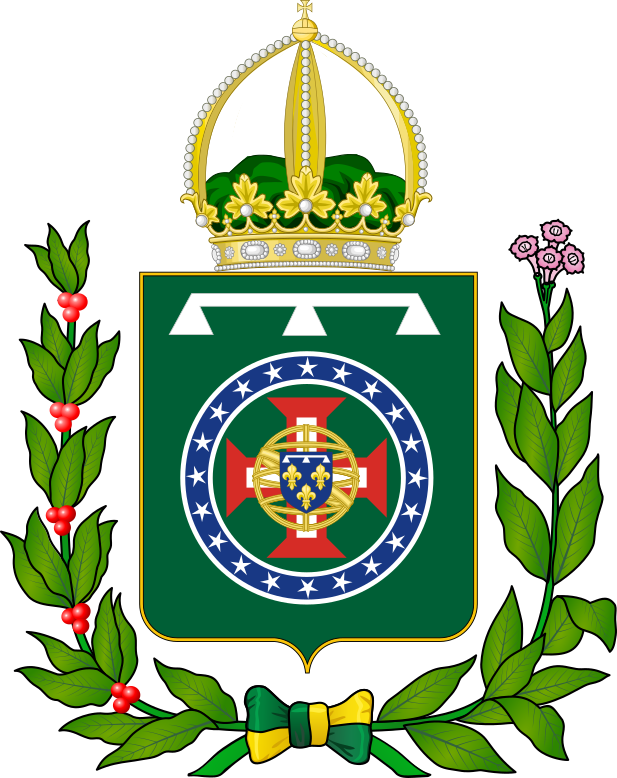
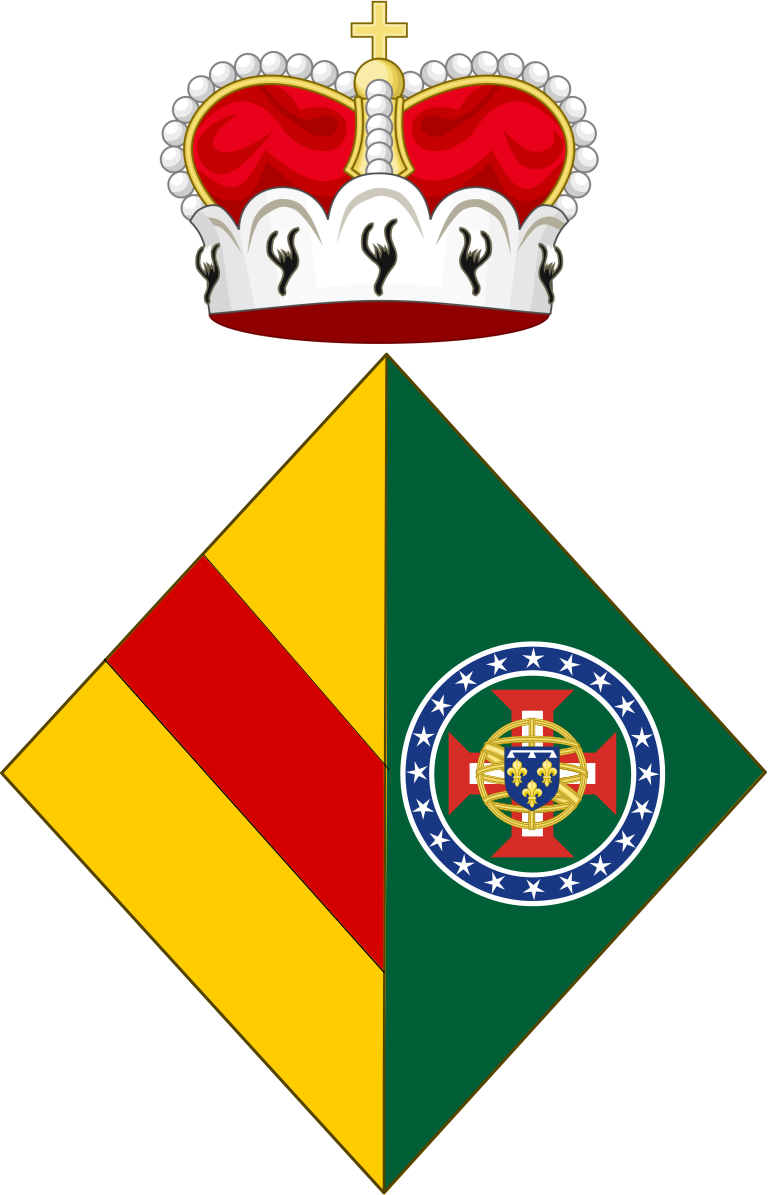
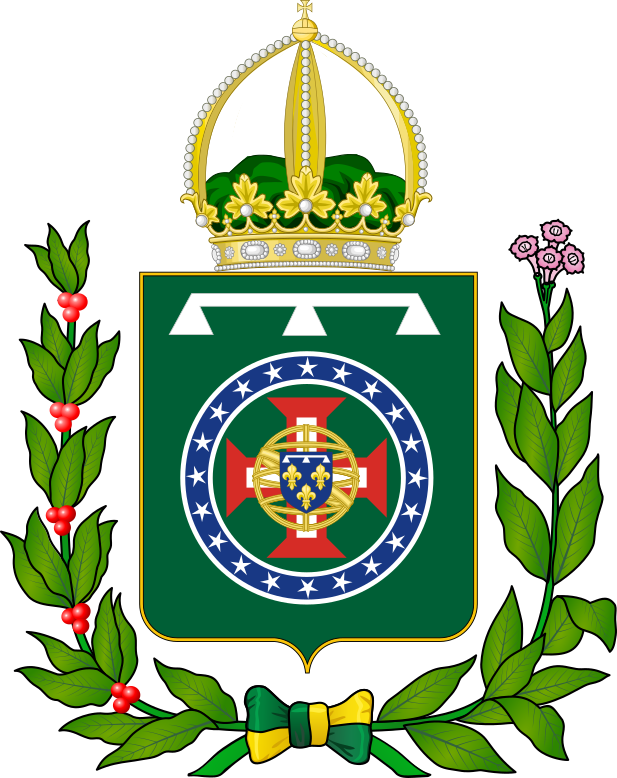
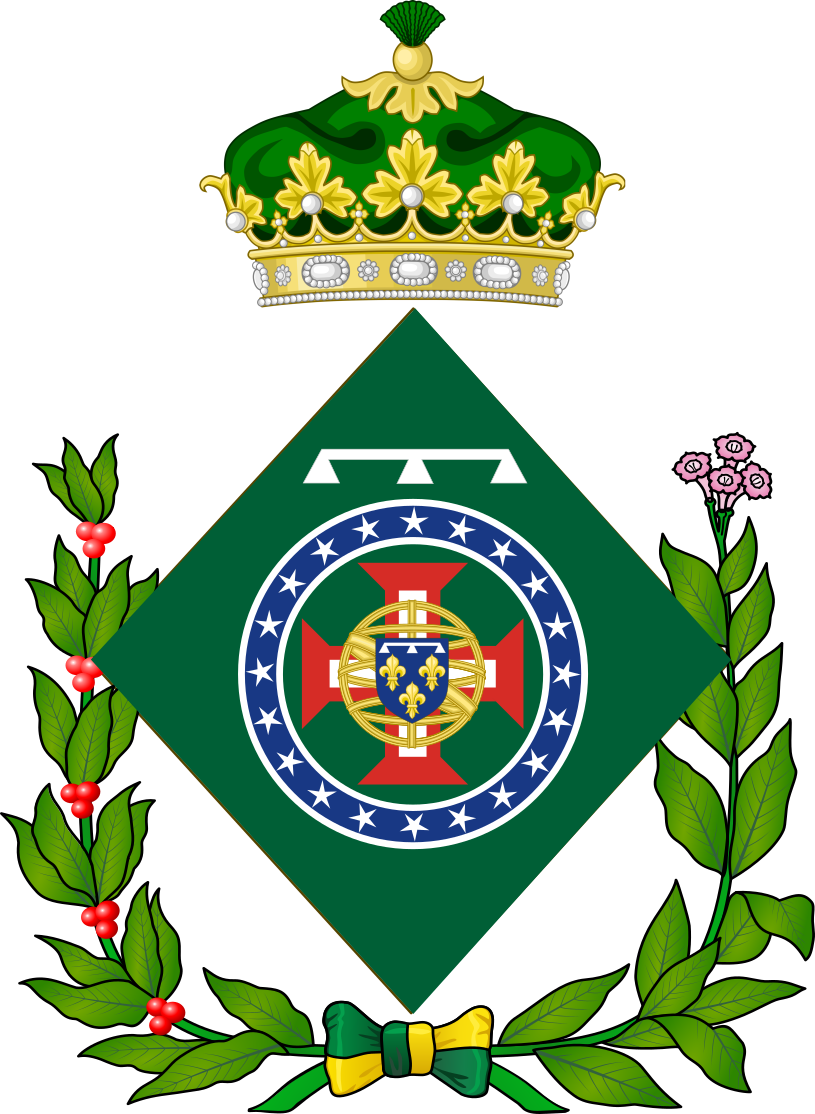
Princess Isabel; Princess Imperial of Brazil; Countess of Eu (1846-1921)
Prince Pedro de Alcântara; Prince Imperial of Brazil; Prince of Orléans-Braganza (1875-1940) | Prince Luís; Prince Imperial of Brazil; Prince of Orléans-Braganza (1878-1920) | Prince Antônio Gastão; Prince of Brazil; Prince of Orléans-Braganza (1881-1918)
Prince Pedro Henrique; Prince and Head of the House of Orléans-Braganza (1909-1981) | Prince Luiz Gastão; Prince Imperial of Brazil; Prince of Orléans-Braganza (1911-1931) | Princess Pia Maria; Princess Imperial of Brazil; Princess of Orléans-Braganza; Countess Nicolay (1913-2000)
Prince Luiz; Prince and Head of the House of Orléans-Braganza (1938–2022) | Prince Bertrand; Prince and Head of the House of Orléans-Braganza (b. 1941) | Princess Isabel; Princess of Brazil; Princess of Orléans-Braganza (1944–2017) | Prince Antônio; Prince Imperial of Brazil; Prince of Orléans-Braganza (1950–2024) | Princess Eleanora; Princess of Brazil; Princess of Orléans-Braganza; Princess of Ligne (b. 1953) | Seven more Princes of Orléans-Braganza who renounced their dynastic rights
Prince Rafael Antônio; Prince Imperial of Brazil; Prince of Orléans-Braganza (b. 1986) | Princess Maria Gabriela; Princess of Brazil; Princess of Orléans-Braganza (b. 1989)

=== Petrópolis line ===
The descendants of Pedro de Alcântara, Prince of Grão-Pará

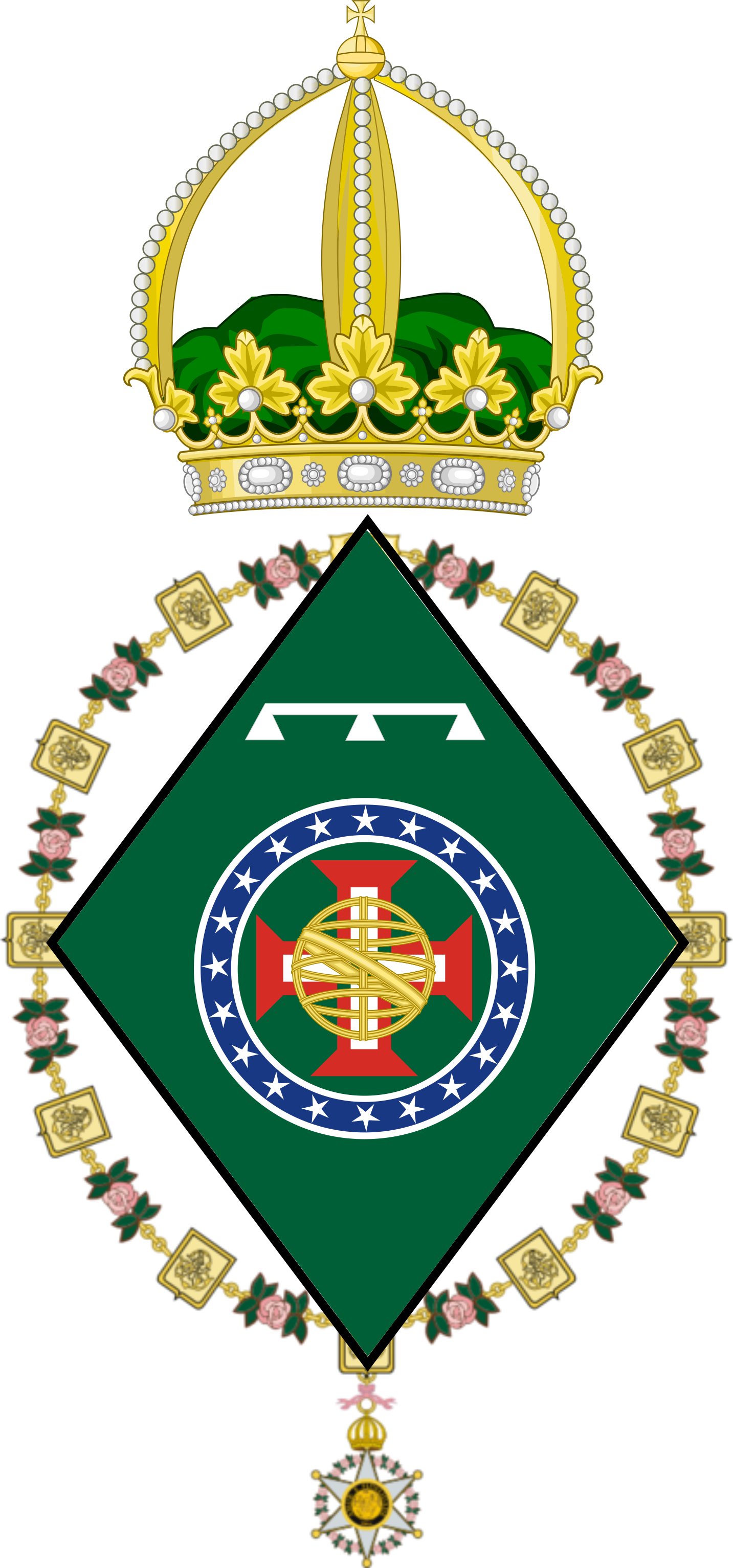
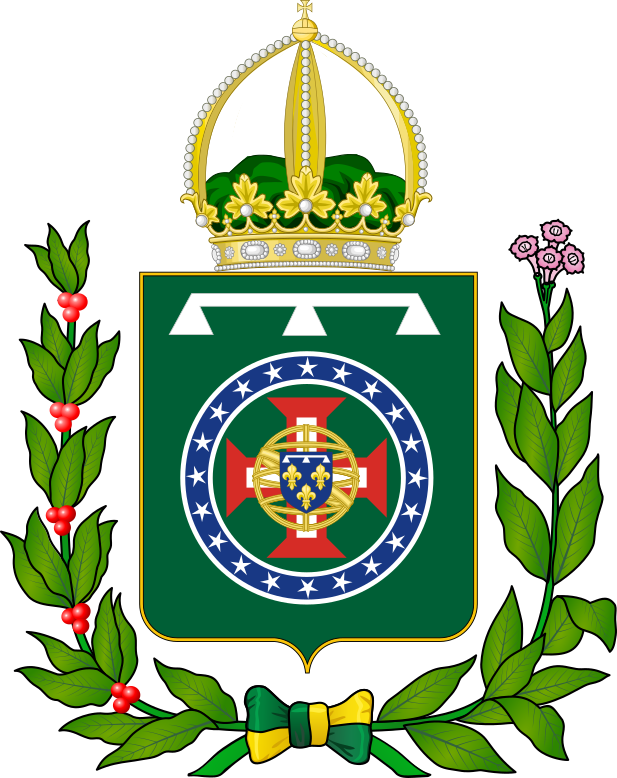
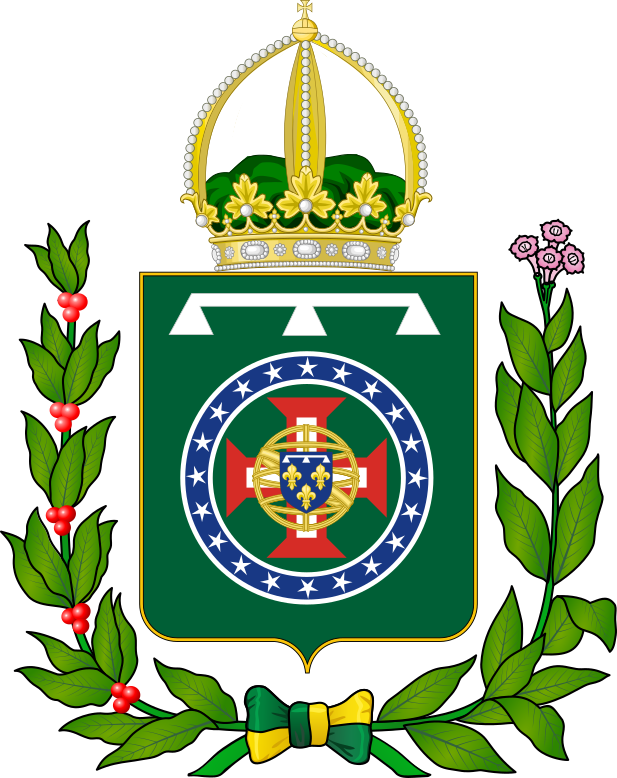
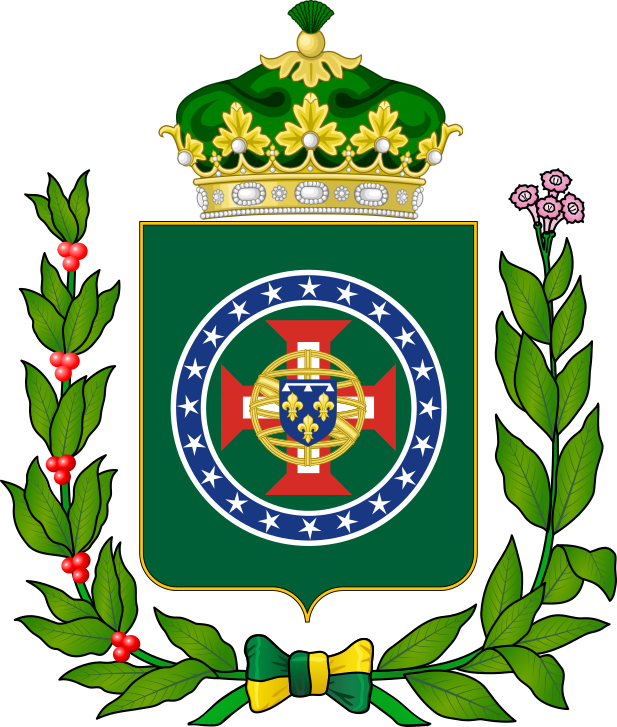
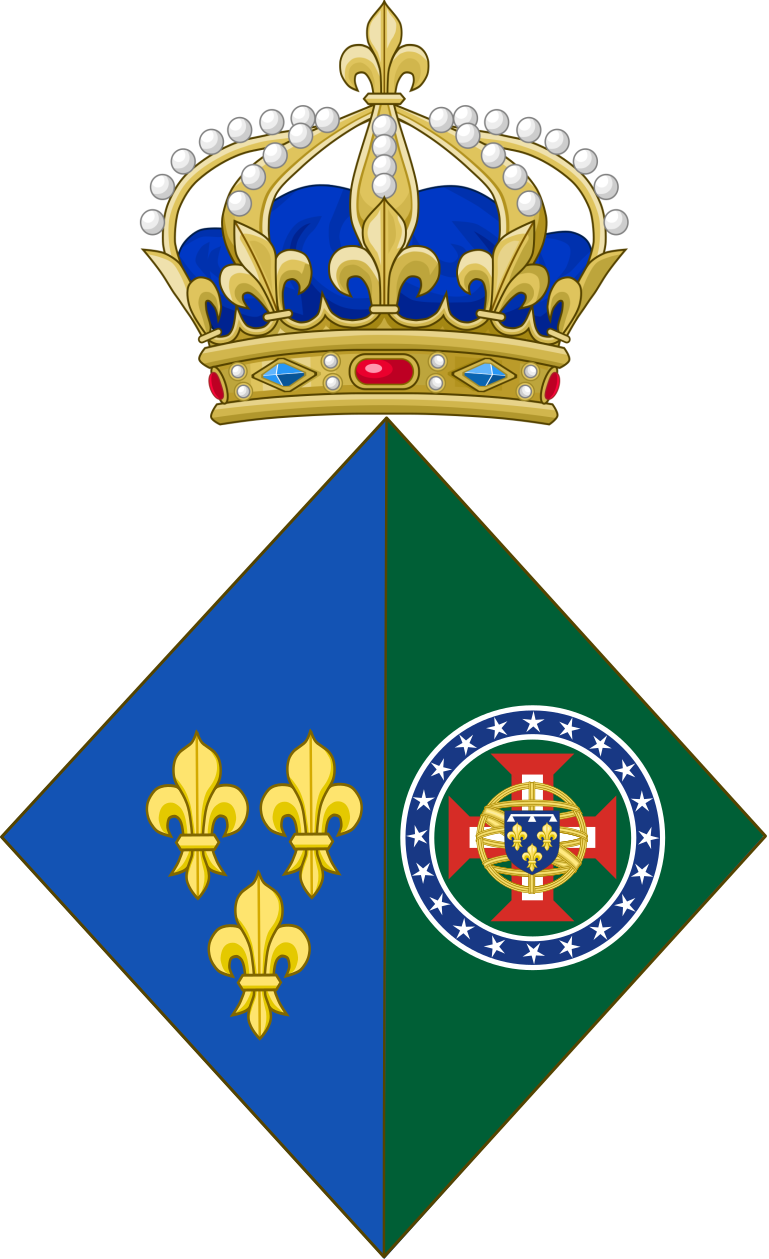
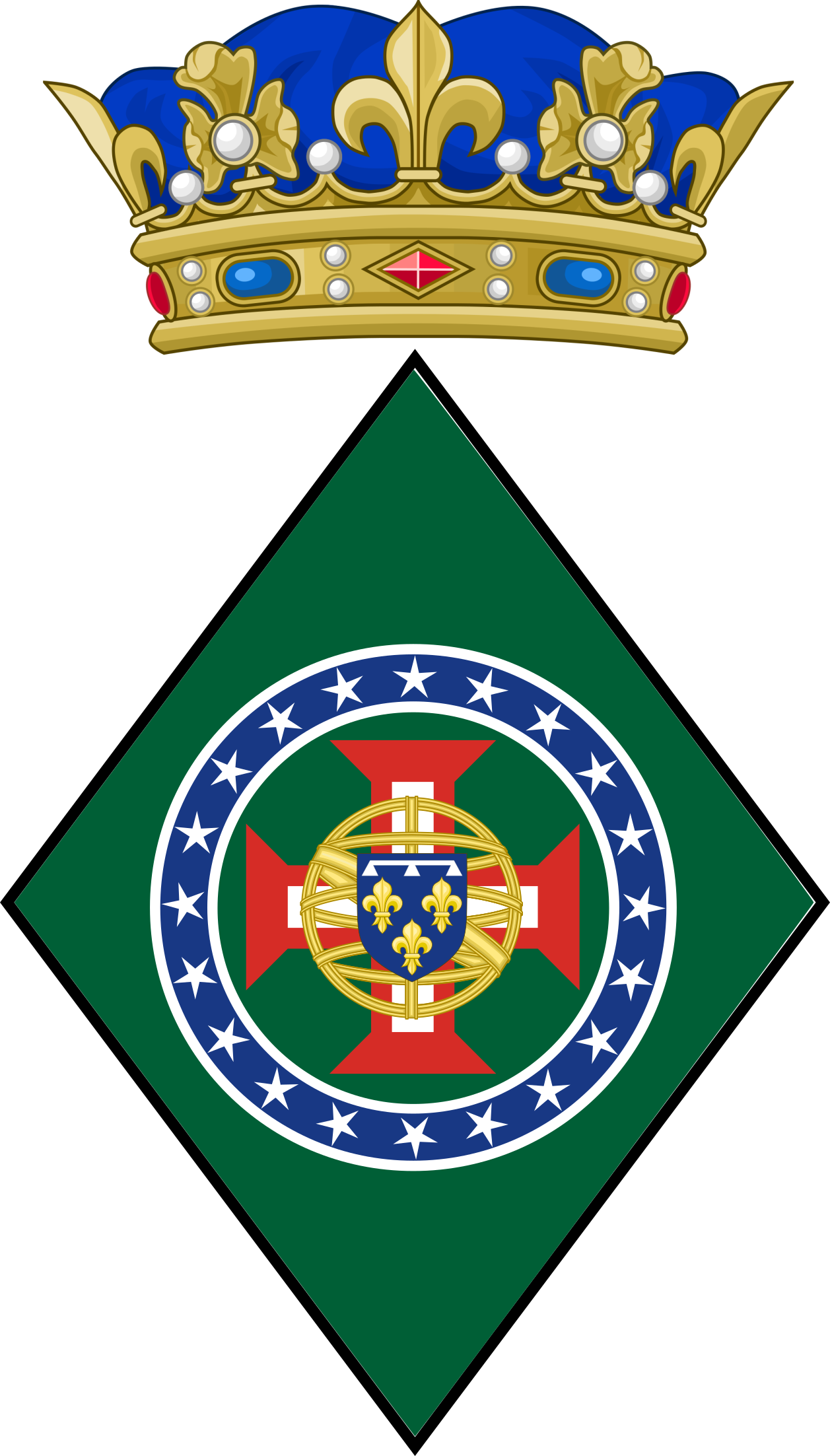
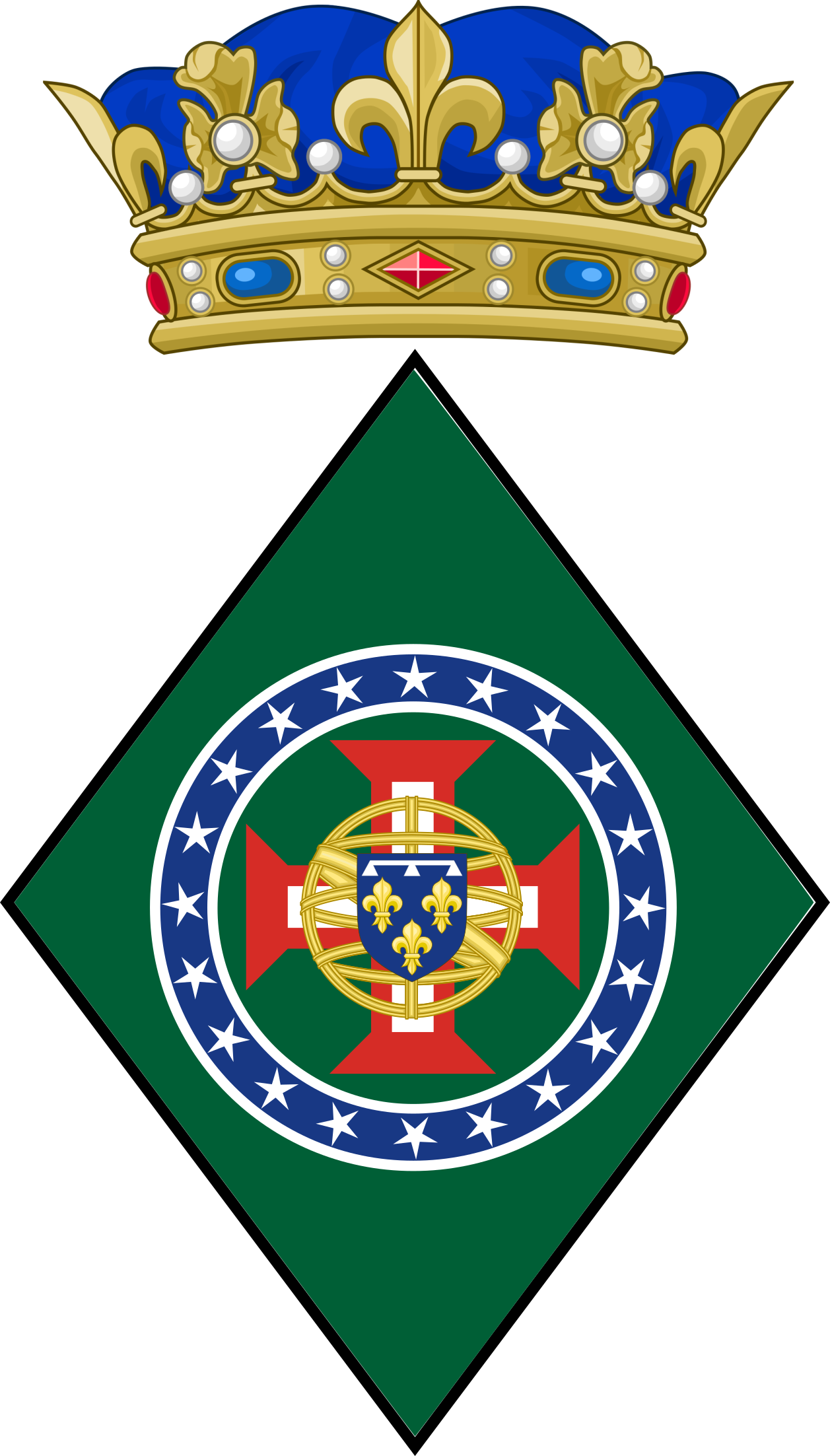
Princess Isabel; Princess Imperial of Brazil; Countess of Eu (1846-1921)
Prince Pedro de Alcântara; Prince Imperial of Brazil; Prince of Orléans-Braganza (1875-1940) | Prince Luís; Prince Imperial of Brazil; Prince of Orléans-Braganza (1878-1920) | Prince Antônio Gastão; Prince of Brazil; Prince of Orléans-Braganza (1881-1918)
Princess Isabelle; Princess of Orléans-Braganza; Countess of Paris (1911-2003) | Prince Pedro Gastão; Prince of Orléans-Braganza (1913-2007) | Princess Maria Francisca; Princess of Orléans-Braganza; Duchess of Braganza (1914-1968) | Prince João Maria; Prince of Orléans-Braganza (1916-2005) | Princess Teresa Teodora; Princess of Orléans-Braganza (1919-2011)
Prince Pedro Carlos; Prince of Orléans-Braganza (b. 1945) | Princess Maria da Glória; Princess of Orléans-Braganza former Crown Princess of Yugoslavia (b. 1946)

== Armorial ==
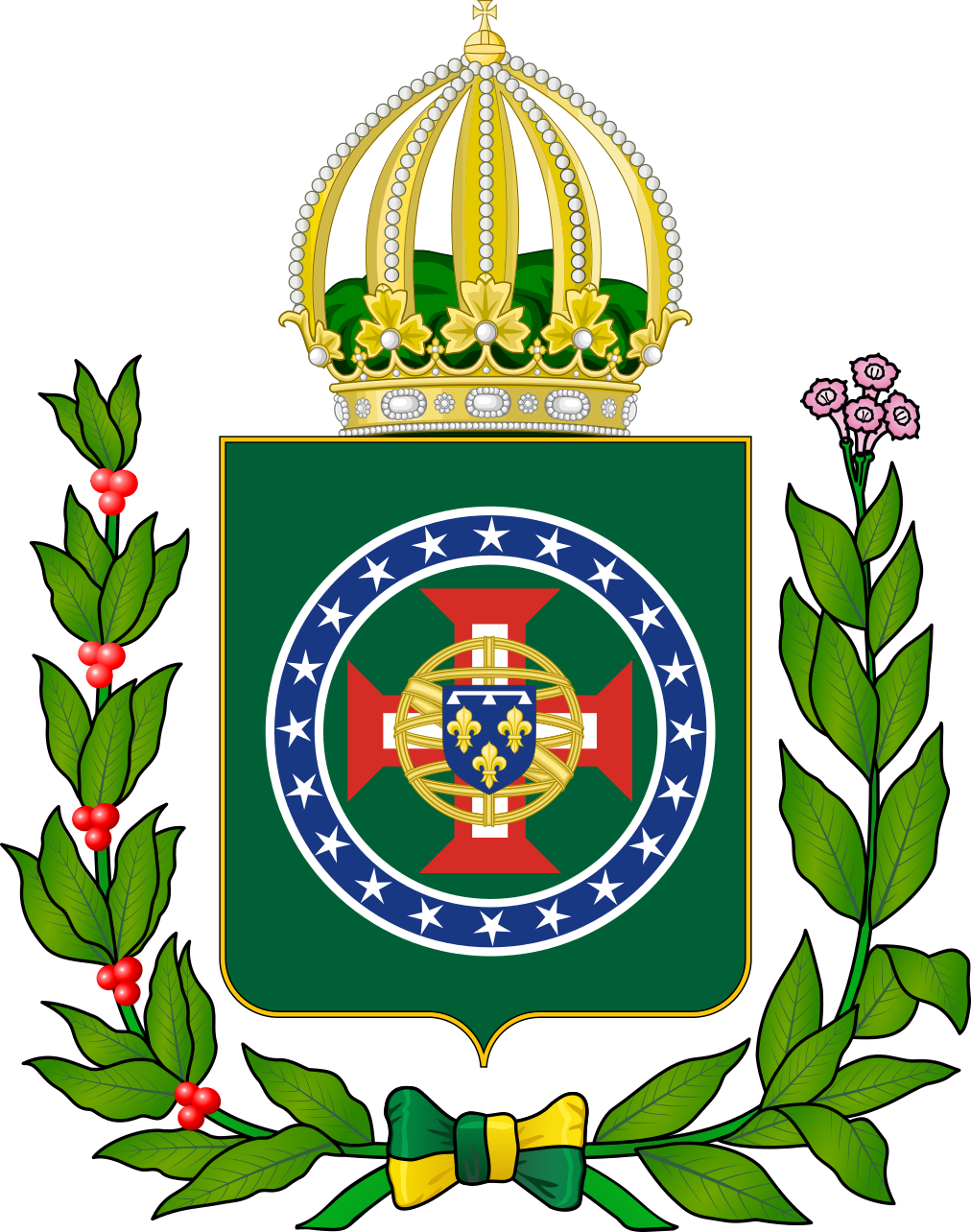
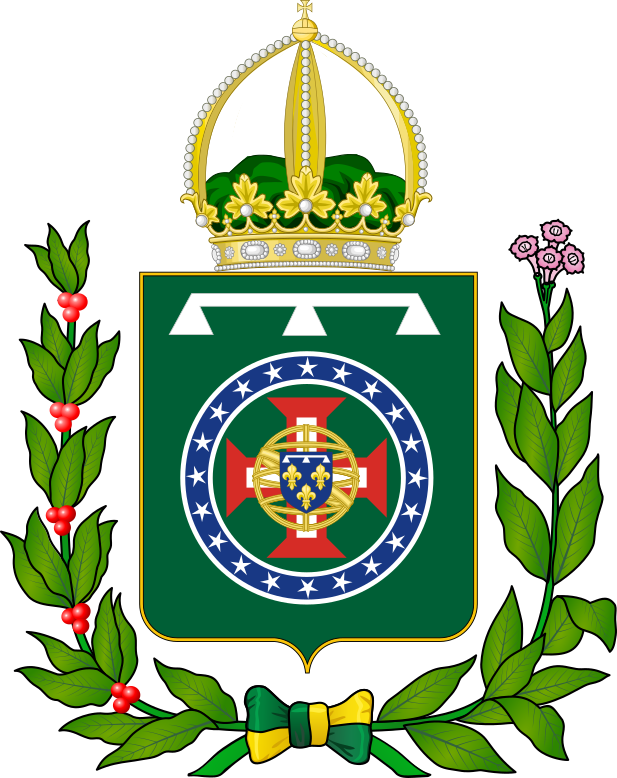
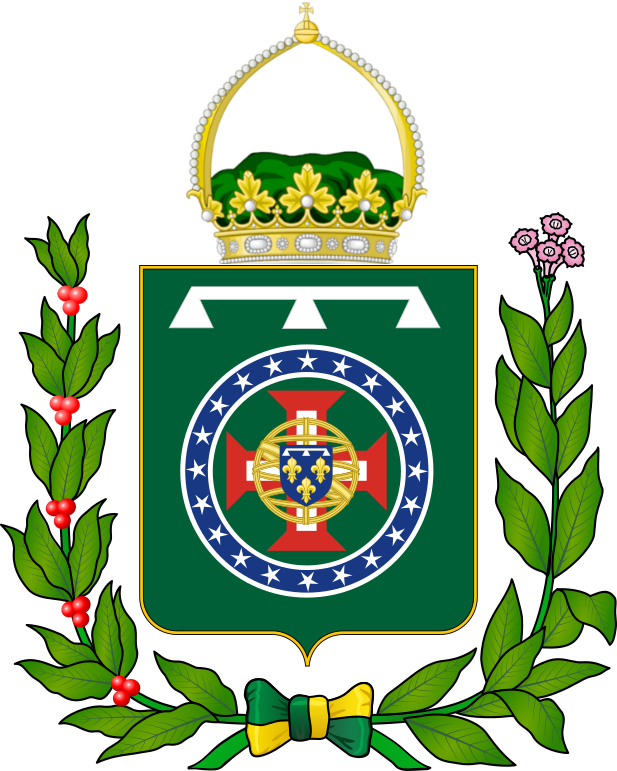
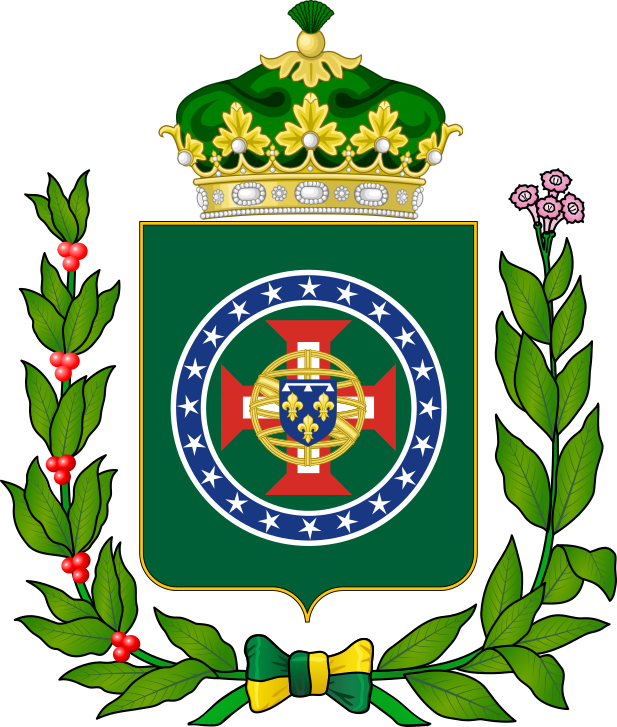
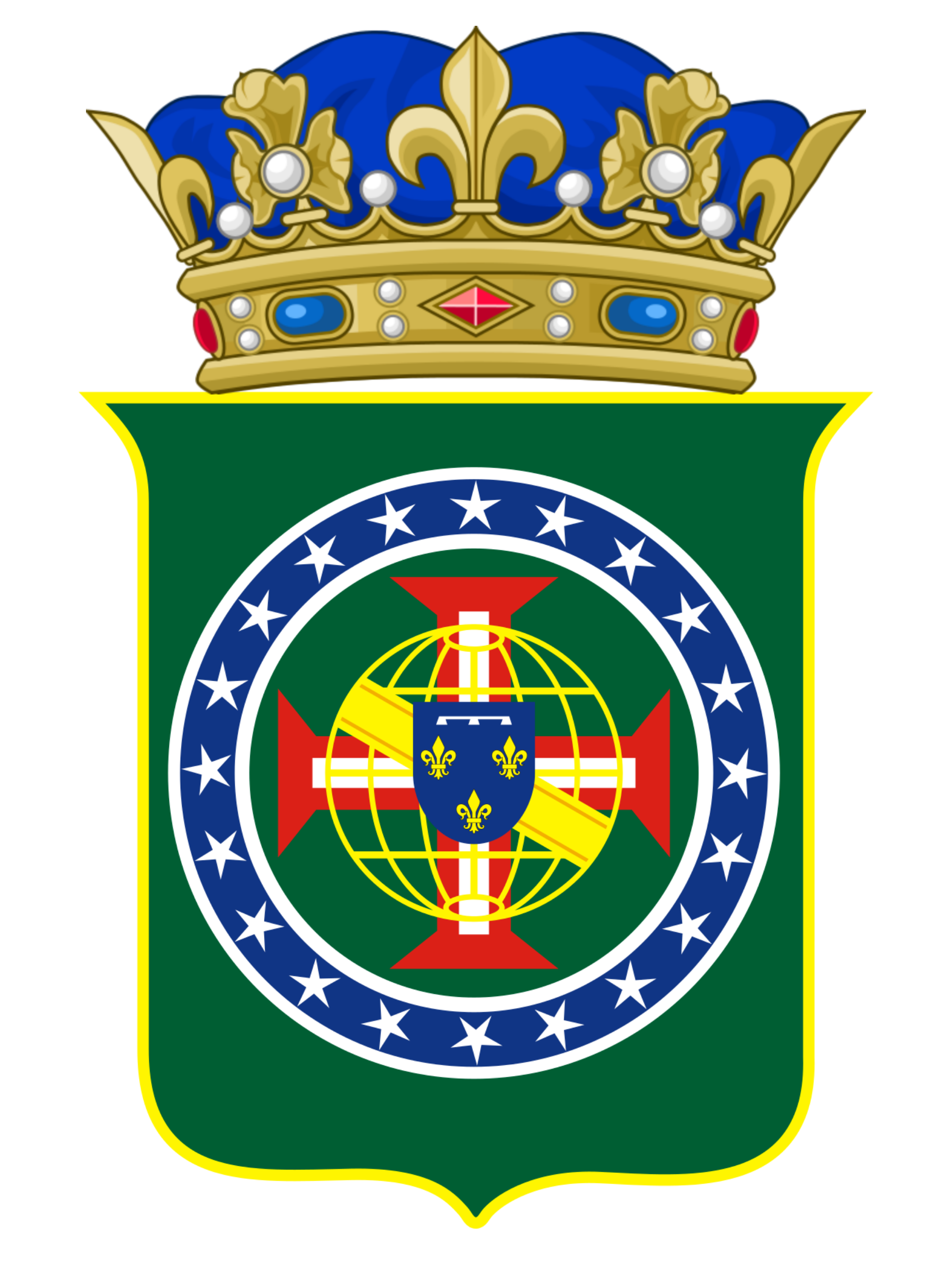
| Coat of arms | Title | Tenure |
|---|---|---|
| | Head of the Imperial Family | 1889–present |
| | Prince Imperial of Brazil | 1822–present |
| | Prince of Grão-Pará | 1822–present |
| | Prince of Brazil | 1822–present |
| | Prince of Orléans-Braganza | 1909–present |

== Estates and properties ==
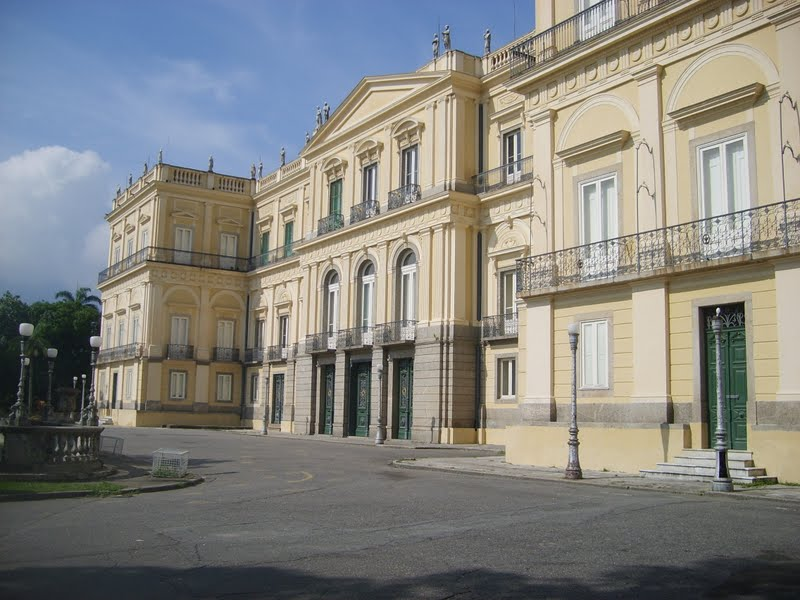
Imperial Palace of São Cristóvão, Rio de Janeiro

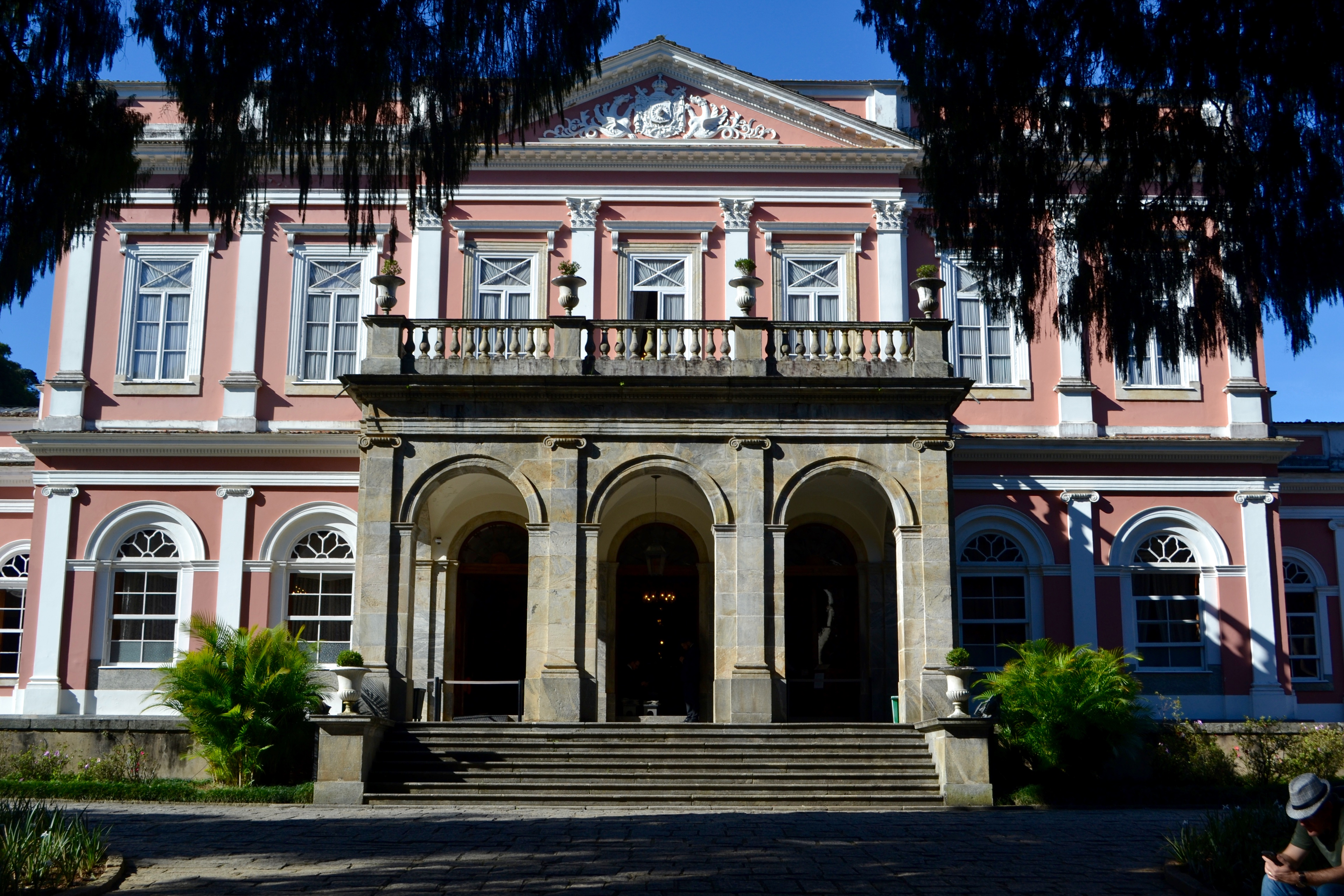
Imperial Palace of Petrópolis, Petrópolis

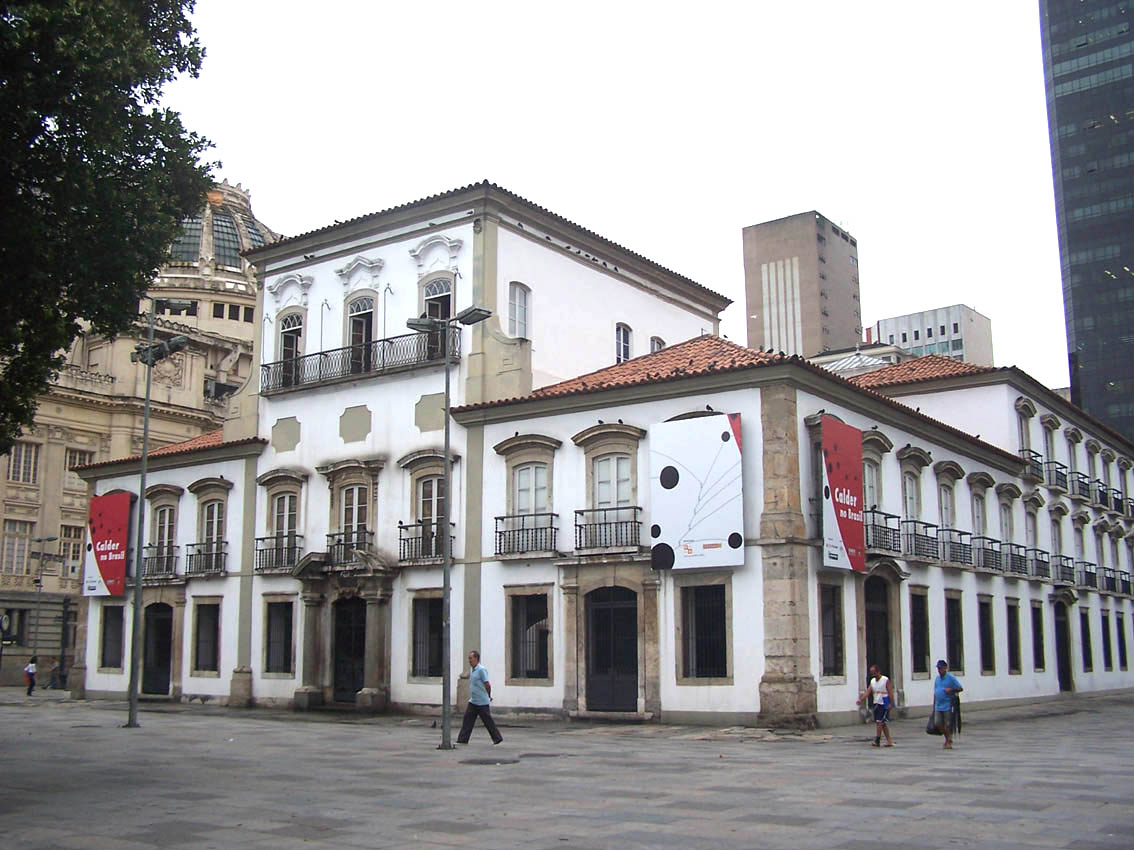
Imperial Palace of Rio de Janeiro, Rio de Janeiro

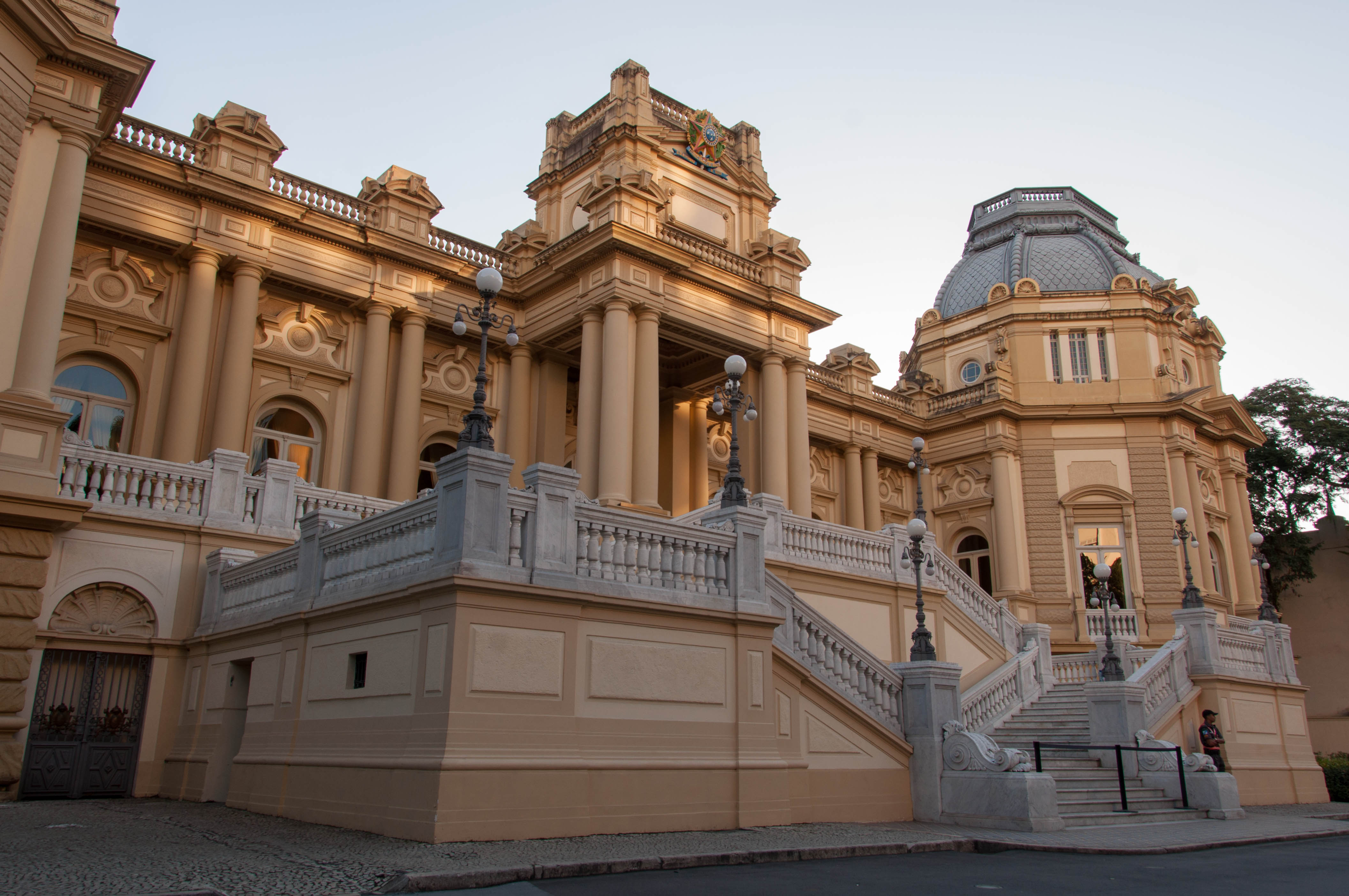
Guanabara Palace, Rio de Janeiro

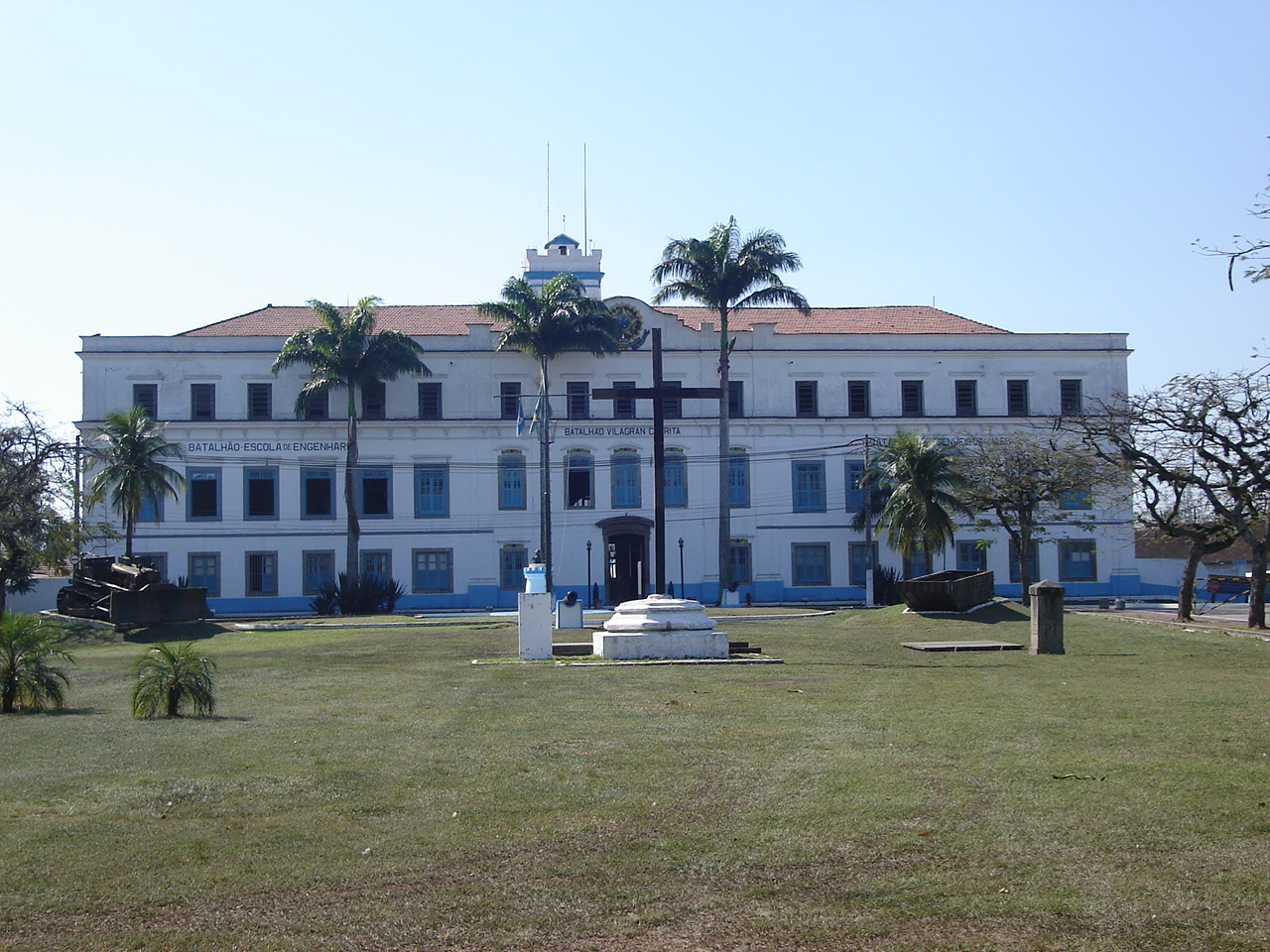
Imperial Santa Cruz Estate, Santa Cruz

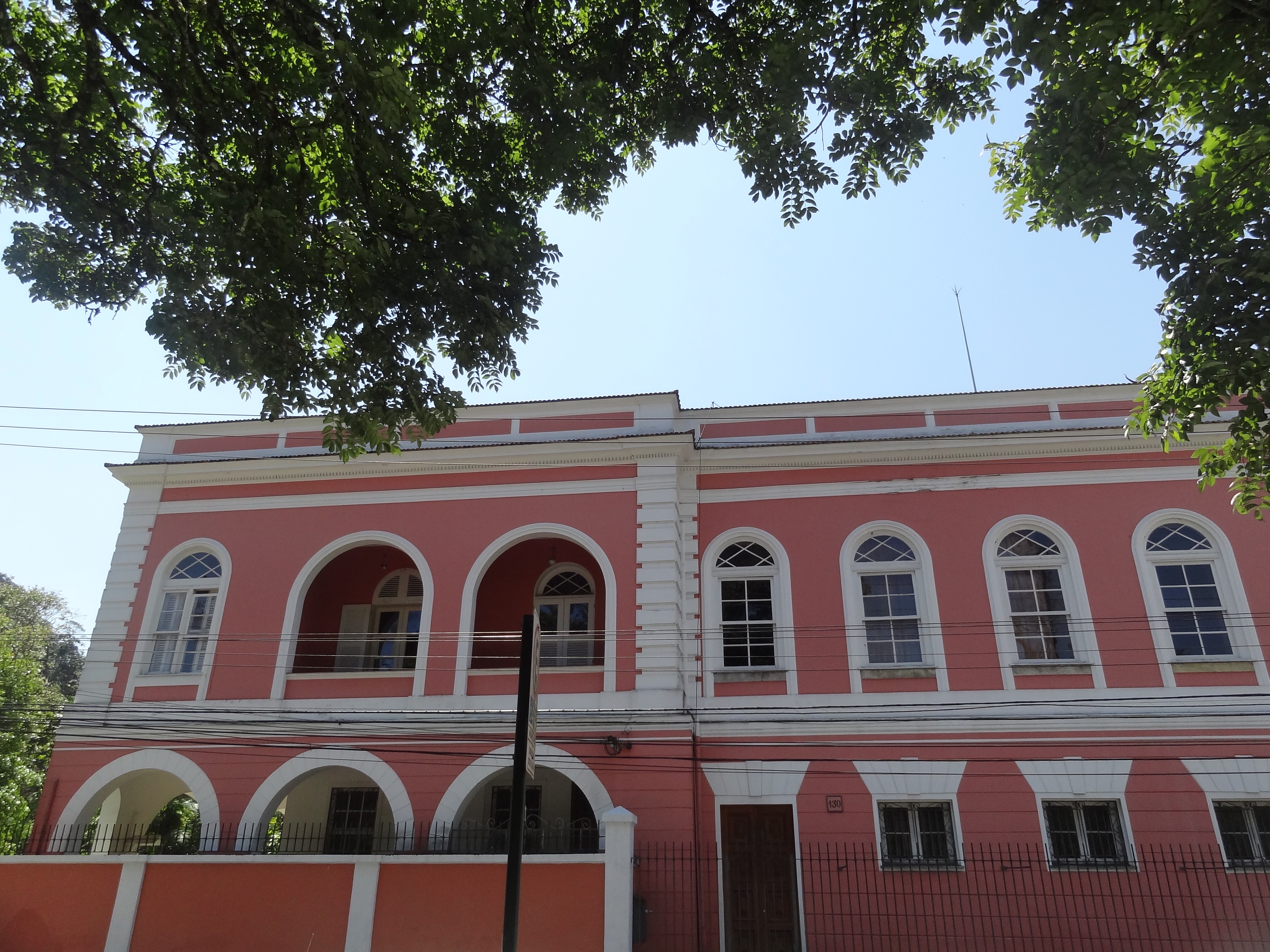
Palace of Grão-Pará, Petrópolis

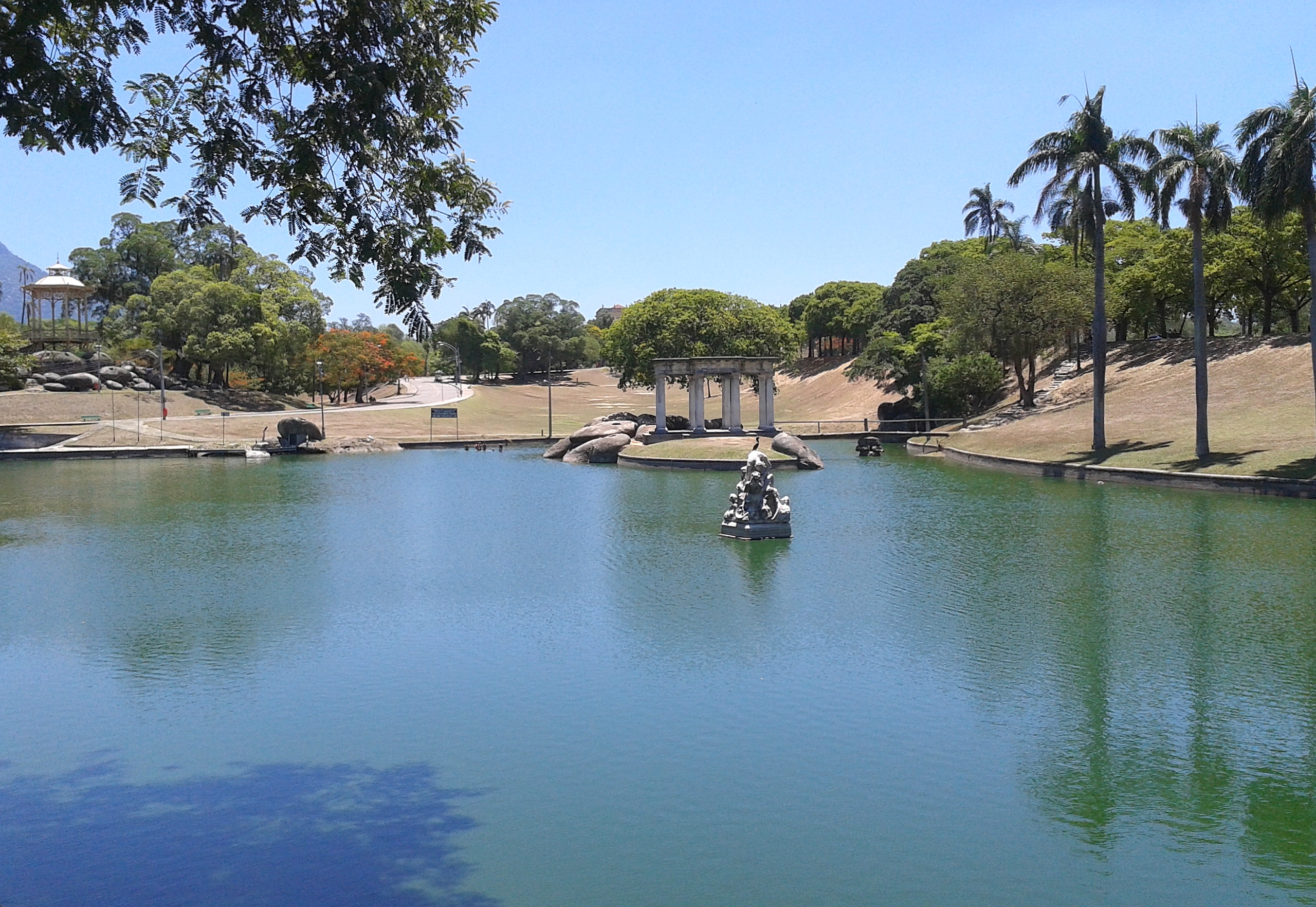
Boa Vista Estate, Rio de Janeiro

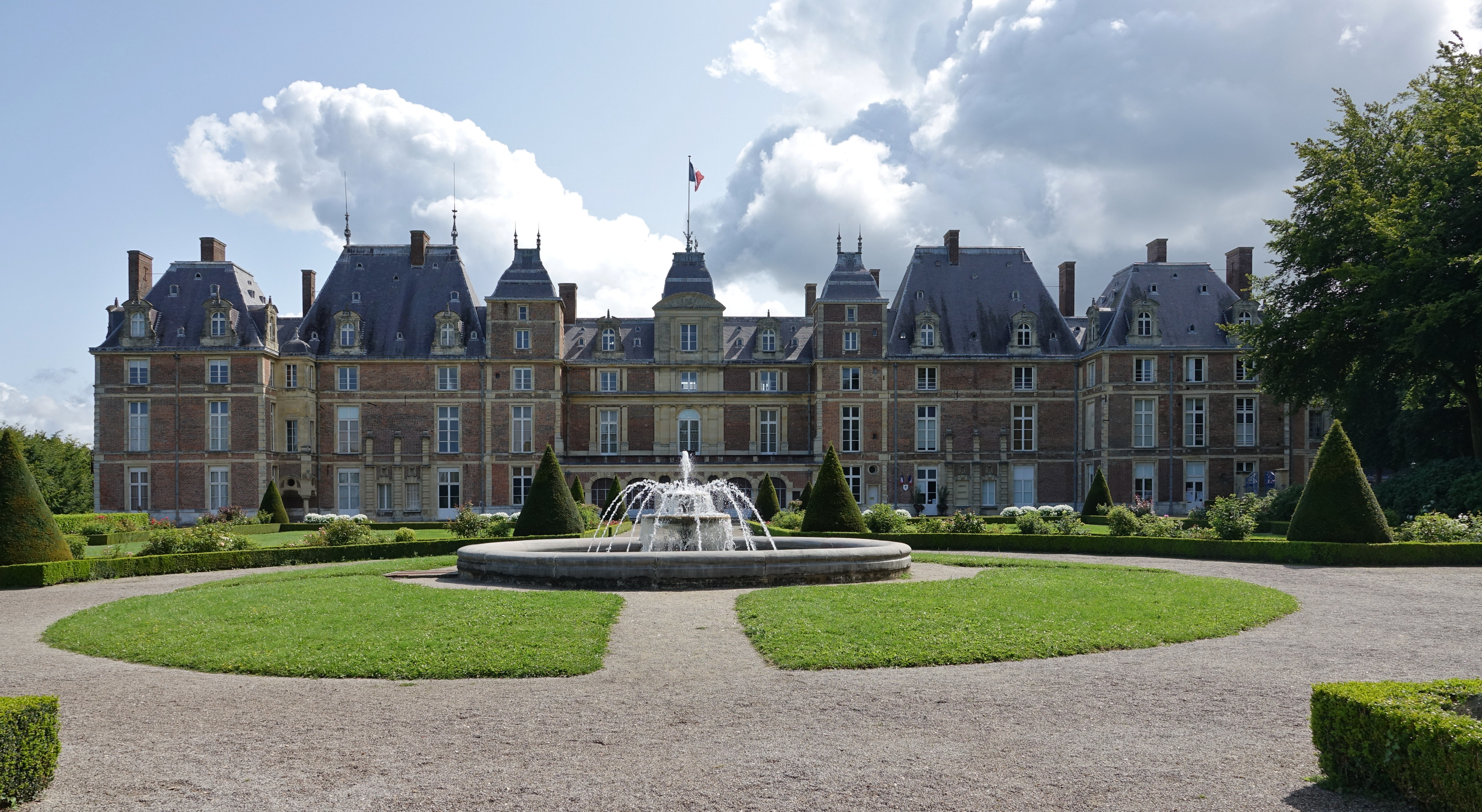
Château d'Eu, Eu (France)

Most members of the Imperial House live in rented apartments in wealthy neighbourhoods, private mansions, or in Europe. Some of them, like Eleanora, Princess of Ligne, live in the royal houses of their spouses.

== See also ==
- Brazilian Imperial Family
- List of Brazilian monarchs

== Bibliography ==
- Janoti, Maria de Lourdes Mônaco (1986). Os Subversivos da República [The Republic's Subversives] (in Brazilian Portuguese). São Paulo: Brasiliense.

Royal House House of Orléans-Braganza Cadet branch of the House of Orléans
| Preceded by House of Braganza as the reigning house | — TITULAR — Claimant House of the Brazilian monarchy 1921–present Reason for succession failure: Brazilian monarchy abolished in 1889 | Incumbent |
