= Prince of Brazil (Brazil) =

Imperial title in the Empire of Brazil

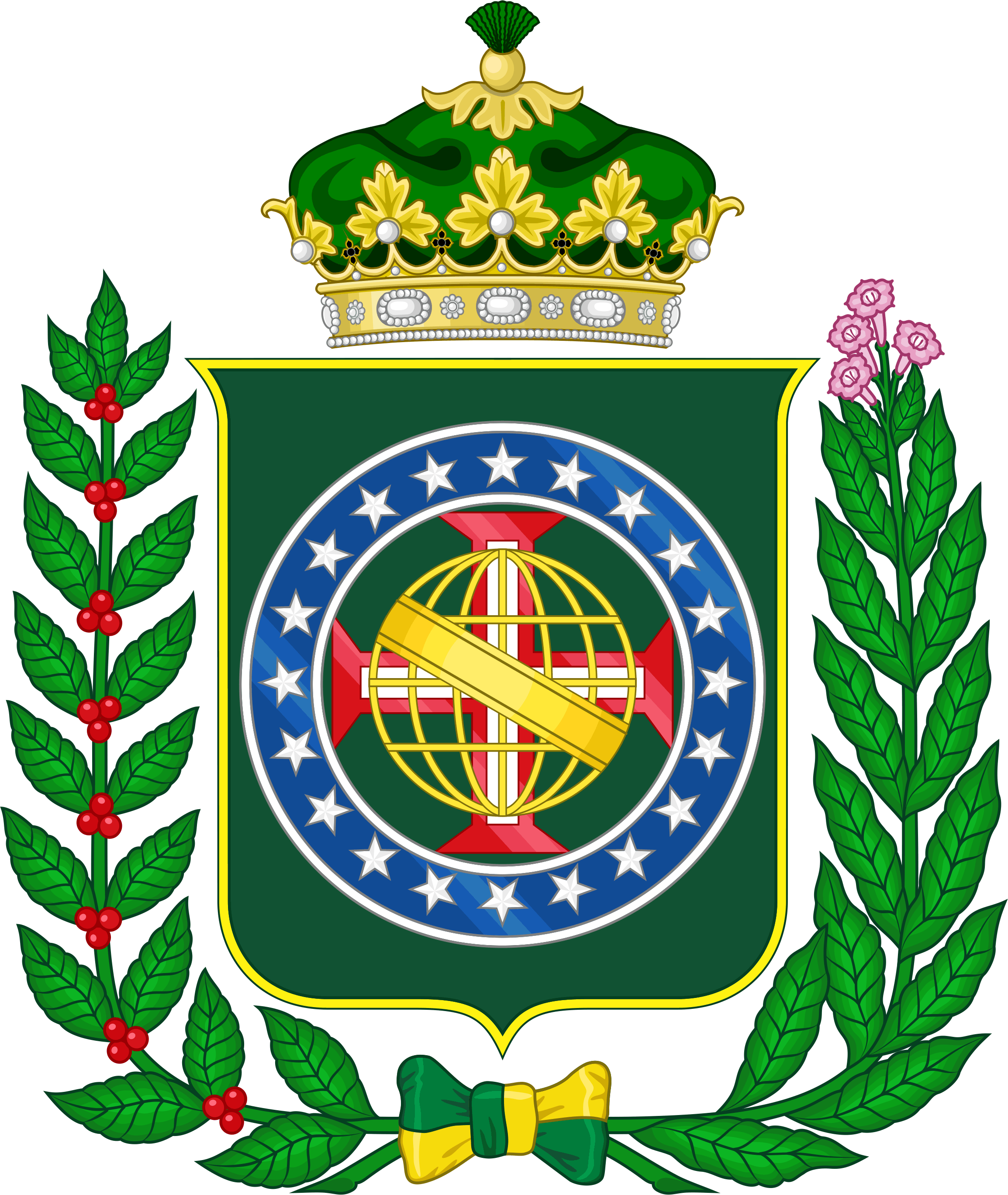
Coat of Arms of the Princes of Brazil

Prince of Brazil (feminine: Princess of Brazil; Portuguese: Príncipe do Brasil; feminine: Princesa do Brasil) was an imperial title of the Empire of Brazil bestowed upon the members of the Brazilian imperial family who were not the heir apparent or heir presumptive to the throne, by the 1824 Brazilian Constitution. After the overthrow of the Brazilian monarchy in 1889, the title was officially abolished by the First Brazilian Republic's 1891 constitution. Nevertheless, the title continues to be used as title of pretense by members of the House of Orléans-Braganza, the cadet branch and successor of the deposed Imperial House.

== Style of Address ==
The titles of members of the Imperial House of Brazil were established by article 105 of the Brazilian constitution of 1824 and regulated, when necessary, by parliament. The article established for princes, other than the heir apparent and heir presumptive, the title of prince, concealing territorial designation, and granted them the style of address of Highness An exception occurred when a Prince of Brazil ascended to the position of heir apparent with the title Prince Imperial, enjoying the style of address of Imperial Highness, but was subsequently deprived of that position and demoted back to Prince of Brazil, in which case it maintained the treatment of Imperial Highness.

After the fall of the monarchy, in 1909, the members of the former Imperial House of Brazil and the former Royal House of France made a pact creating Brazilian dynasts in the Orléanist line of succession to the French throne the title Prince of Orléans-Braganza with the style of Royal Highness which, ranking above Highness, started to be used by members of the House of Orléans-Braganza.

== Princes of Brazil ==
The Emperor Pedro II had no adult sons, only two daughters. The eldest and his heiress, Isabel, Princess Imperial of Brazil, therefore, transmitted the princely titles to her children, while the youngest, Princess Leopoldina of Brazil, transmitted them only to the two eldest of her four sons, due to an agreement made between their father and Ernst II, Duke of Saxe-Coburg and Gotha, so that the children, born Princes of Saxe-Coburg and Gotha (due to Leopoldina's marriage to Prince Ludwig August of Saxe-Coburg and Gotha) were raised as Princes of Brazil and potential heirs to the Brazilian throne by their grandfather.

== See also ==
- Prince of Brazil (the title used from 1645 to 1816 to designate the heir to the Portuguese throne)
- Prince Imperial of Brazil
- Prince of Grão-Pará

== Bibliography ==
- Bragança, Dom Carlos Tasso de Saxe-Coburgo e. A Princesa Leopoldina, in Revista do Instituto Histórico e Geográfico Brasileiro, vol. 243, 1959, p. 70-93 (ISSN 0101-4366)
