= Pedro II of Brazil =

Emperor of Brazil from 1831 to 1889

Pedro II
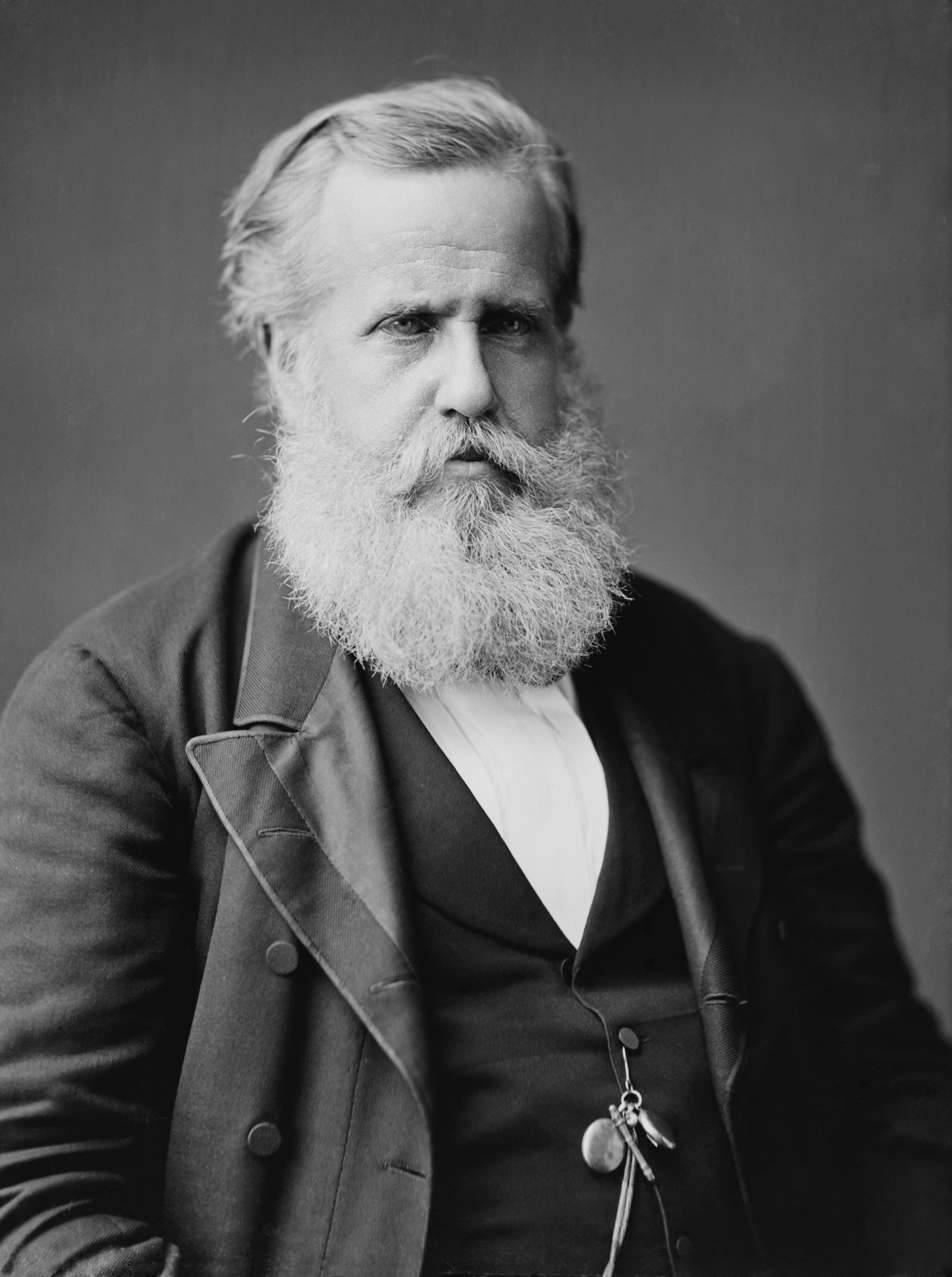
- Photograph c. 1876

Emperor of Brazil
- Reign: 7 April 1831 – 15 November 1889
- Coronation: 18 July 1841; Imperial Chapel
- Predecessor: Pedro I
- Successor: Monarchy abolished (Deodoro da Fonseca as President of the Republic)
- Regents: See list (1831–1840)
- Prime ministers: See list

Head of the Imperial House of Brazil
- Tenure: 7 April 1831 – 5 December 1891
- Predecessor: Pedro I, Emperor of Brazil
- Successor: Isabel, Princess Imperial
- Born: 2 December 1825; Palace of São Cristóvão, Rio de Janeiro, Empire of Brazil
- Died: 5 December 1891 (aged 66); Paris, France
- Burial: 5 December 1939; Cathedral of São Pedro de Alcântara, Petrópolis, Brazil
- Spouse: Teresa Cristina of the Two Sicilies (m. 1843; died 1889)
- Issue Detail: Afonso, Prince Imperial; Isabel, Princess Imperial; Princess Leopoldina; Pedro Afonso, Prince Imperial
Names
- Pedro de Alcântara João Carlos Leopoldo Salvador Bibiano Francisco Xavier de Paula Leocádio Miguel Gabriel Rafael Gonzaga
- House: Braganza
- Father: Pedro I of Brazil
- Mother: Maria Leopoldina of Austria
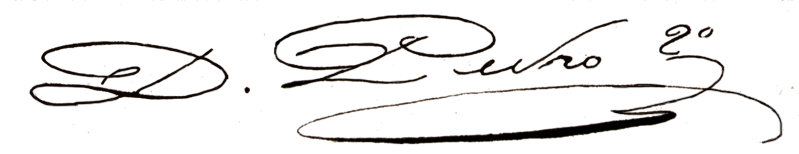
- Signature

Dom Pedro II (Pedro de Alcântara João Carlos Leopoldo Salvador Bibiano Francisco Xavier de Paula Leocádio Miguel Gabriel Rafael Gonzaga; 2 December 1825 – 5 December 1891), known as "the Magnanimous" (Portuguese: O Magnânimo), was the second and final emperor of the Empire of Brazil. He reigned from 1831 until his deposition in the military coup of 1889, presiding over the longest and most stable reign in Brazilian history. (Note: "The Second Reign, that is, the period in which our Emperor was D. Pedro II, lasted fifty-eight years, from the abdication of his father, D. Pedro I, in 1831, until the proclamation of the republic in 1889." —Hélio Viana in Viana 1994, p. 467)

Born in Rio de Janeiro, Pedro II was the seventh child of Emperor Pedro I and Empress Maria Leopoldina. His father's abdication and departure for Europe in 1831 left the five-year-old prince as emperor, ushering in a regency period marked by political instability and shaping a childhood dominated by rigorous education and preparation for rule. These formative years profoundly influenced his character, instilling a strong sense of duty, intellectual curiosity, and devotion to public service, alongside a growing personal ambivalence toward monarchy.

During his long reign, Pedro II transformed Brazil from a fragile post-colonial state into a consolidated and internationally respected power. His government was characterized by political stability, freedom of speech, respect for civil rights, economic growth, and the functioning of a constitutional parliamentary system. Brazil achieved military success in conflicts such as the Platine War, the Uruguayan War, and the Paraguayan War, while also resolving numerous internal revolts and diplomatic disputes. Despite resistance from powerful interests, Pedro II ultimately supported and enabled the abolition of slavery in Brazil, a defining achievement of his reign.

A patron of education, culture, and science, Pedro II gained international recognition as a learned and enlightened ruler. Nevertheless, in 1889 he was overthrown in a coup d'état with limited popular backing, led primarily by military elites favoring a republican regime. Disillusioned and unwilling to provoke civil conflict, he accepted exile without resistance. Pedro II spent his final years in Europe, living modestly and largely alone.

Though deposed at the height of his personal popularity, the monarchy itself was actively delegitimized by the succeeding republican government. In the decades that followed, as Brazil's republics proved turbulent and often authoritarian, historians reassessed the imperial era more favorably – repatriating his remains to Brazil with national honors and consistently ranking him among the greatest statesmen in Brazilian history, with many considering him the greatest Brazilian ruler.

== Early life ==
=== Birth ===
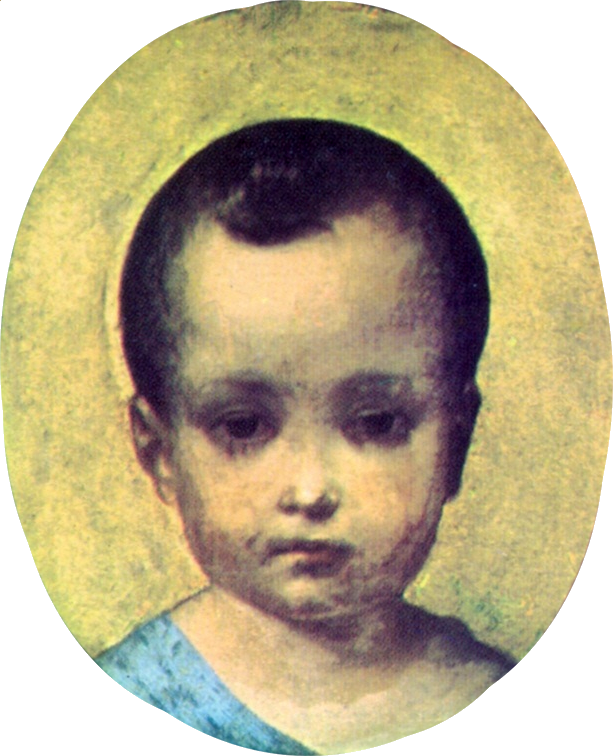
Pedro at 10 months old, 1826

Pedro was born at 02:30 on 2 December 1825 in the Palace of São Cristóvão, in Rio de Janeiro, Brazil. Named after St. Peter of Alcantara, his name in full was Pedro de Alcântara João Carlos Leopoldo Salvador Bibiano Francisco Xavier de Paula Leocádio Miguel Gabriel Rafael Gonzaga. Through his father, Emperor Dom Pedro I, he was a member of the Brazilian branch of the House of Braganza (Portuguese: Bragança) and was referred to using the honorific Dom (Lord) from birth. He was the grandson of King Dom John VI of Portugal and nephew of Dom Miguel I. His mother was the Archduchess Maria Leopoldina of Austria, daughter of Francis II, the last Holy Roman Emperor. Through his mother, Pedro was a nephew of Napoleon Bonaparte and first cousin of Emperors Napoleon II of France, Franz Joseph I of Austria-Hungary and Maximilian I of Mexico.

The only legitimate male child of Pedro I to survive infancy, he was officially recognized as heir apparent to the Brazilian throne with the title Prince Imperial on 6 August 1826. Empress Maria Leopoldina died on 11 December 1826, a few days after a stillbirth, when Pedro was a year old. Two and a half years later, his father married Princess Amélie of Leuchtenberg. Prince Pedro developed an affectionate relationship with her, whom he came to regard as his mother. Pedro I's desire to restore his daughter Maria II to her Portuguese throne, which had been usurped by his brother Miguel I, as well as his declining political position at home led to his abrupt abdication on 7 April 1831. He and Amélie immediately departed for Europe, leaving behind the Prince Imperial, who became Emperor Dom Pedro II.

=== Early coronation ===
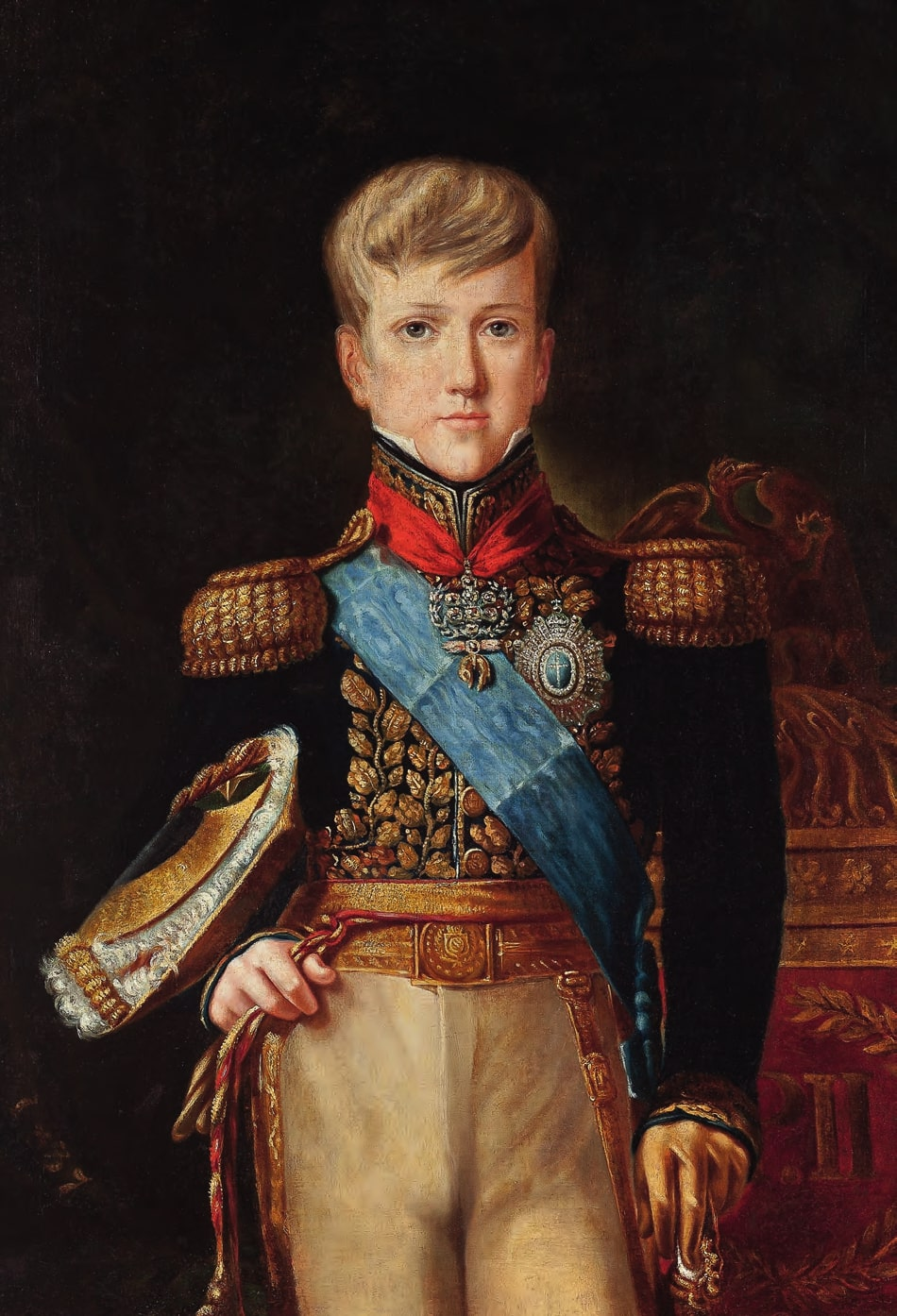
Pedro II at age 12 wearing court dress and the Order of the Golden Fleece, 1838

Upon leaving the country, Emperor Pedro I selected three people to take charge of his son and remaining daughters. The first was José Bonifácio de Andrada, his friend and an influential leader during Brazilian independence, who was appointed guardian. The second was Mariana de Verna, who had held the post of aia (governess) since the birth of Pedro II. As a child, the then-Prince Imperial called her "Dadama", as he could not pronounce the word dama (Lady) correctly. He regarded her as his surrogate mother and would continue to call her by her nickname well into adulthood out of affection. The third person was Rafael, an Afro-Brazilian veteran of the Cisplatine War. He was an employee in the Palace of São Cristóvão whom Pedro I deeply trusted and asked to look after his son—a charge that he carried out for the rest of his life.

Bonifácio was dismissed from his position in December 1832 and replaced by another guardian. Pedro II spent his days studying, with only two hours set aside for amusements. Though Pedro II was intelligent, the hours of study were strenuous and the preparation for his role as monarch was demanding. He had few friends of his age and limited contact with his sisters. All that coupled with the sudden loss of his parents gave Pedro II an unhappy and lonely upbringing. The environment in which he was raised turned him into a shy and needy person who saw books as a refuge and retreat from the real world.

The possibility of lowering the young Emperor's age of majority, instead of waiting until he turned 18, had been floated since 1835. His elevation to the throne had led to a troublesome period of endless crises. The regency created to rule on his behalf was plagued from the start by disputes between political factions and rebellions across the nation. Those politicians who had risen to power during the 1830s had by now also become familiar with the pitfalls of rule. Historian Roderick J. Barman stated that by 1840, "they had lost all faith in their ability to rule the country on their own. They accepted Pedro II as an authority figure whose presence was indispensable for the country's survival". When asked by politicians if he would like to assume full powers, Pedro II accepted. On the following day, 23 July 1840, the General Assembly (the Brazilian Parliament) formally declared the 14-year-old Pedro II of age. He was later acclaimed, crowned, and consecrated on 18 July 1841.

== Consolidation ==
=== Imperial authority established ===
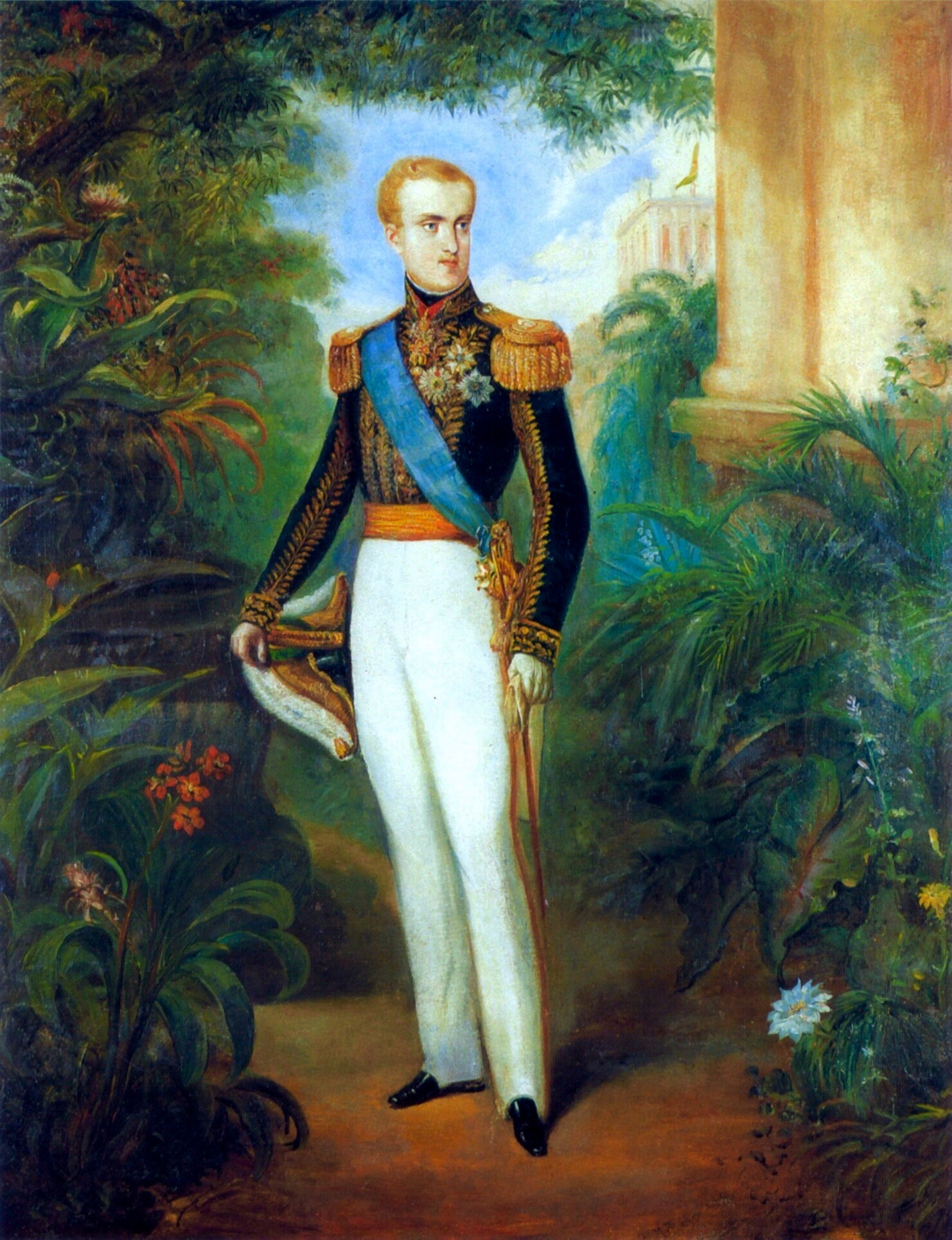
Pedro II at age 20 wearing court dress, 1846

Removal of the factious regency brought stability to the government. Pedro II was seen nationwide as a legitimate source of authority, whose position placed him above partisanship and petty disputes. He was, however, still young as well as shy and insecure. Behind the scenes, a group of high-ranking palace servants and notable politicians led by Aureliano Coutinho (later Viscount of Sepetiba) became known as the "Courtier Faction" as they established influence over the young Emperor. Some were very close to him, such as Mariana de Verna and Steward Paulo Barbosa da Silva. Pedro II was deftly used by the Courtiers against their actual or suspected foes.

The Brazilian government secured the hand of Princess Teresa Cristina of the Kingdom of the Two Sicilies. She and Pedro II were married by proxy in Naples on 30 May 1843. Upon seeing her in person, the Emperor was noticeably disappointed. Teresa Cristina was short, a bit overweight, and not considered conventionally pretty. He did little to hide his disillusionment. One observer stated that he turned his back to Teresa Cristina, another depicted him as being so shocked that he needed to sit. That evening, Pedro II wept and complained to Mariana de Verna, "They have deceived me, Dadama!" It took several hours to convince him that duty demanded that he proceed. The Nuptial Mass, with the ratification of the vows previously taken by proxy and the conferral of the nuptial blessing, occurred on the following day, 4 September.

In late 1845 and early 1846, the Emperor made a tour of Brazil's southern provinces, traveling through São Paulo (of which Paraná was a part at this time), Santa Catarina and Rio Grande do Sul. He was buoyed by the warm and enthusiastic responses he received. By then Pedro II had matured physically and mentally. He grew into a man who, at 1.90 meters (6 ft 3 in) tall with blue eyes and blond hair, was seen as handsome. Over time, he developed greater confidence and became known for his diligence, impartiality, and courteous conduct. Barman said that he kept "his emotions under iron discipline. He was never rude and never lost his temper. He was exceptionally discreet in words and cautious in action." Most importantly, this period saw the end of the Courtier Faction. Pedro II began to fully exercise authority and successfully engineered the end of the courtiers' influence by removing them from his inner circle while avoiding any public disruption.

=== Abolition of the slave trade and war ===
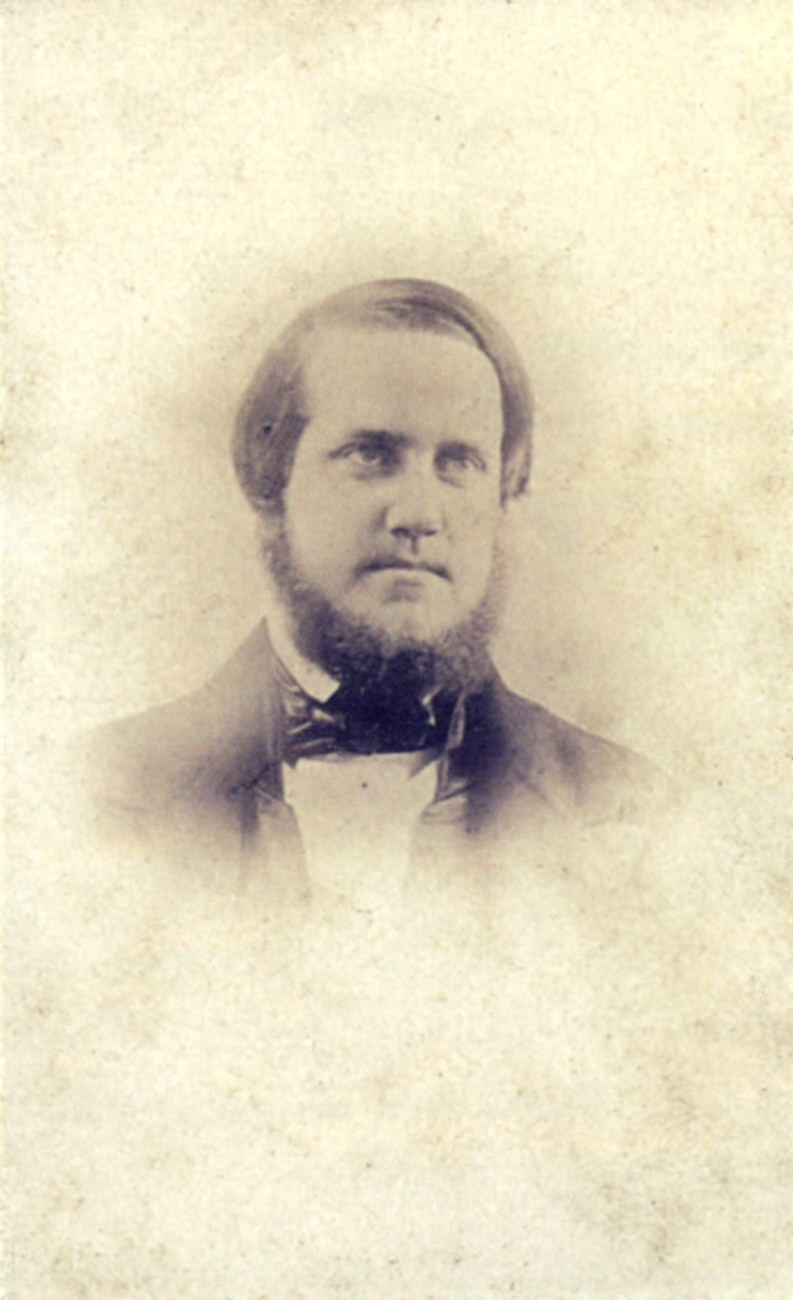
Pedro II around age 22, c. 1848. This is the earliest surviving photograph of the Emperor

Pedro II was faced by three crises between 1848 and 1852. The first test came in confronting the trade in illegally imported slaves. This had been banned in 1826 as part of a treaty with the United Kingdom. Trafficking continued unabated, however, and the British government's passage of the Slave Trade (Brazil) Act 1845 (8 & 9 Vict. c. 122) authorized British warships to board Brazilian shipping and seize any found involved in the slave trade. While Brazil grappled with this problem, the Praieira revolt erupted on 6 November 1848. This was a conflict between local political factions within Pernambuco province; it was suppressed by March 1849. The Eusébio de Queirós Law was promulgated on 4 September 1850, which gave the Brazilian government broad authority to combat the illegal slave trade. With this new tool, Brazil moved to eliminate importation of slaves. By 1852, this first crisis was over, and Britain accepted that the trade had been suppressed.

The third crisis entailed a conflict with the Argentine Confederation regarding ascendancy over territories adjacent to the Río de la Plata and free navigation of that waterway. Since the 1830s, Argentine dictator Juan Manuel de Rosas had supported rebellions within Uruguay and Brazil. It was only in 1850 that Brazil was able to address the threat posed by Rosas. An alliance was forged between Brazil, Uruguay and disaffected Argentines, leading to the Platine War and the subsequent overthrow of the Argentine ruler in February 1852. Barman said that a "considerable portion of the credit must be ... assigned to the Emperor, whose cool head, tenacity of purpose, and sense of what was feasible proved indispensable."

The Empire's successful navigation of these crises considerably enhanced the nation's stability and prestige, and Brazil emerged as a hemispheric power. Internationally, Europeans began to regard the country as embodying familiar liberal ideals, such as freedom of the press and constitutional respect for civil liberties. Its representative parliamentary monarchy also stood in stark contrast to the mix of dictatorships and instability endemic in the other nations of South America during this period.

== Growth ==
=== Pedro II and politics ===
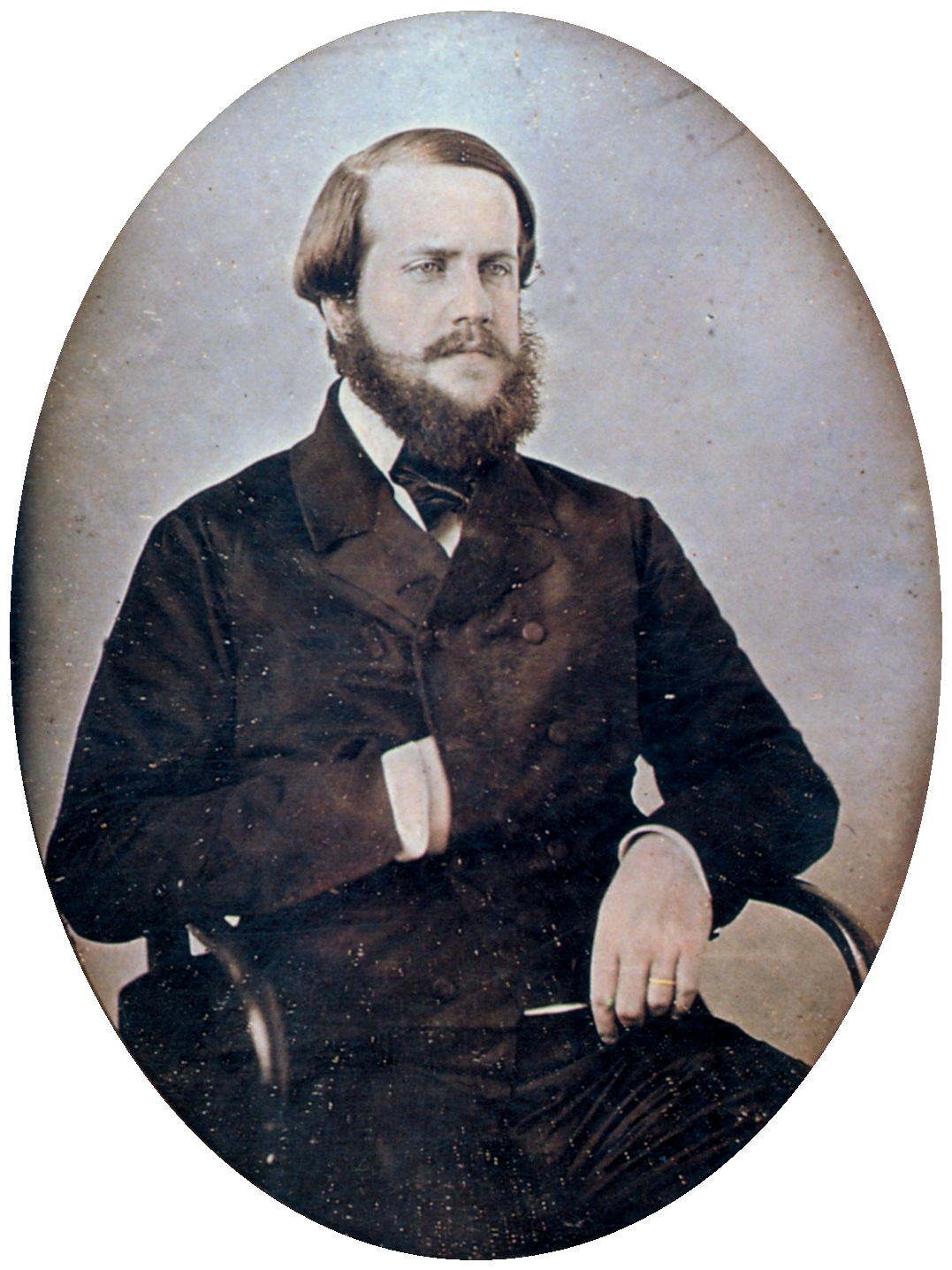
Pedro II around age 25, c.1851

At the beginning of the 1850s, Brazil enjoyed internal stability and economic prosperity. Under the prime ministry of Honório Hermeto Carneiro Leão (then-Viscount and later Marquis of Paraná) the Emperor advanced his own ambitious program: the conciliação (conciliation) and melhoramentos (material developments). Pedro II's reforms aimed to promote less political partisanship, and forward infrastructure and economic development. The nation was being interconnected through railroad, electrical telegraph, and steamship lines, uniting it into a single entity. The general opinion, both at home and abroad, was that these accomplishments had been possible due to Brazil's "governance as a monarchy and the character of Pedro II".

Pedro II was neither a British-style figurehead nor an autocrat in the manner of Russian czars. The Emperor exercised power through cooperation with elected politicians, economic interests, and popular support. The active presence of Pedro II on the political scene was an important part of the government's structure, which also included the cabinet, the Chamber of Deputies and the Senate (the latter two formed the General Assembly). He used his participation in directing the course of government as a means of influence. His direction became indispensable, although it never devolved into "one-man rule." In his handling of the political parties, he "needed to maintain a reputation for impartiality, work in accord with the popular mood, and avoid any flagrant imposition of his will on the political scene."

The Emperor's more notable political successes were achieved primarily because of the non-confrontational and cooperative manner with which he approached both issues and the partisan figures with whom he had to deal. He was remarkably tolerant, seldom taking offense at criticism, opposition or even incompetence. He did not have the constitutional authority to force acceptance of his initiatives without support, and his collaborative approach towards governing kept the nation progressing and enabled the political system to successfully function. The Emperor respected the prerogatives of the legislature, even when they resisted, delayed, or thwarted his goals and appointments. Most politicians appreciated and supported his role. Many had lived through the regency period, when the lack of an emperor who could stand above petty and special interests led to years of strife between political factions. Their experiences in public life had created a conviction that Pedro II was "indispensable to Brazil's continued peace and prosperity."

=== Domestic life ===
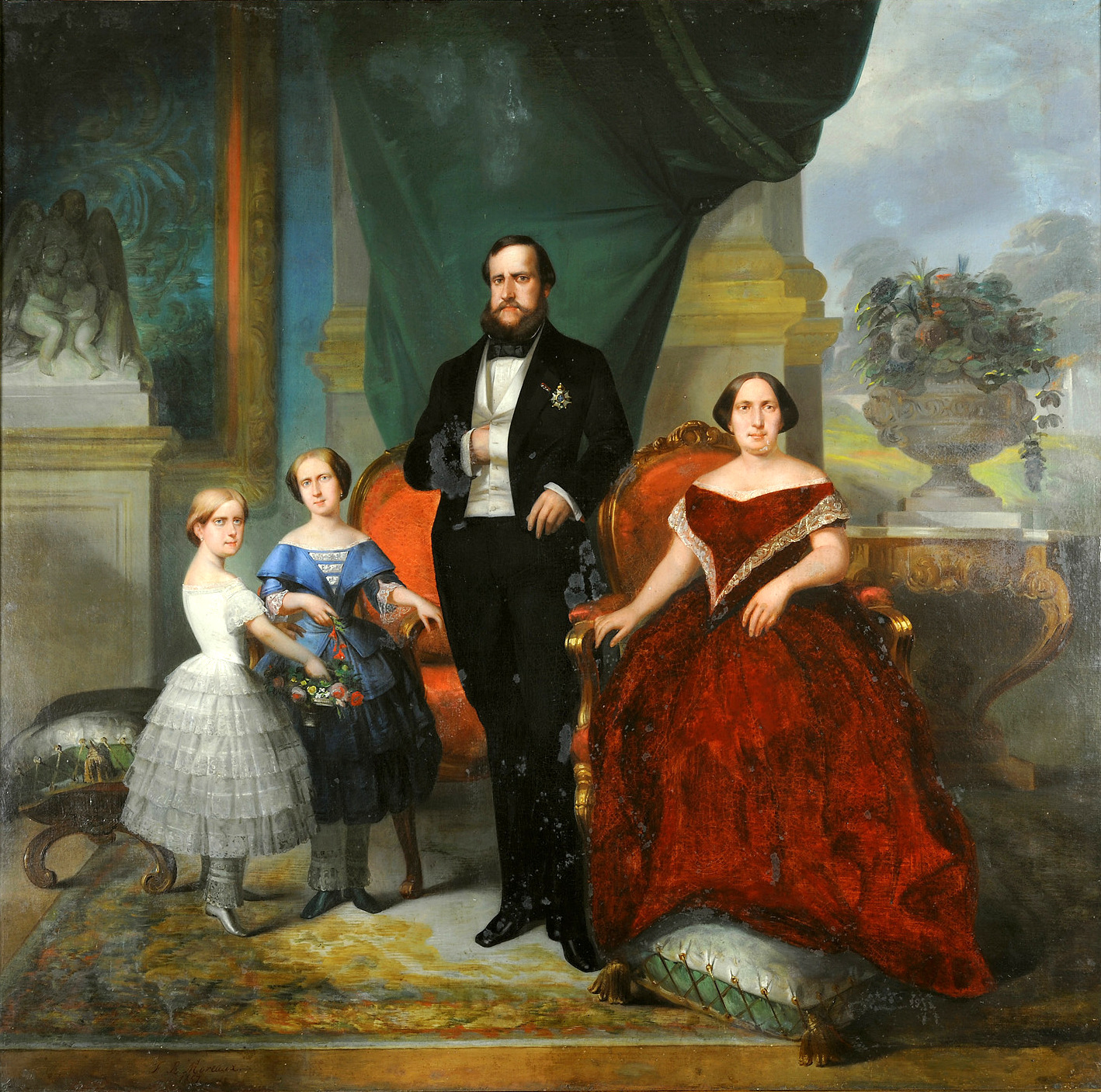
Pedro II and Teresa Cristina with their surviving children Princesses Leopoldina and Isabel, 1857

The marriage between Pedro II and Teresa Cristina started off badly. With maturity, patience and their first child, Afonso, their relationship improved. Later Teresa Cristina gave birth to more children: Isabel, in 1846; Leopoldina, in 1847; and lastly, Pedro Afonso, in 1848. Both boys died when very young, which devastated the Emperor and completely changed his view of the Empire's future. Despite his affection for his daughters, he did not believe that Princess Isabel, although his heir, would have any chance of prospering on the throne. He felt his successor needed to be male for the monarchy to be viable. He increasingly saw the imperial system as being tied so inextricably to himself, that it would not survive him. Isabel and her sister received a remarkable education, although they were given no preparation for governing the nation. Pedro II excluded Isabel from participation in government business and decisions.

Sometime around 1850, Pedro II began having discreet affairs with other women. The most famous and enduring of these relationships involved Luísa Margarida Portugal de Barros, Countess of Barral, with whom he formed a romantic and intimate, though not adulterous, friendship after she was appointed governess to the emperor's daughters in November 1856. Throughout his life, the Emperor held onto a hope of finding a soulmate, something he felt cheated of due to the necessity of a marriage of state to a woman for whom he never felt passion. This is but one instance illustrating his dual identity: one who assiduously carried out his duty as emperor and another who considered the imperial office an unrewarding burden and who was happier in the worlds of literature and science.

Pedro II maintained a demanding daily schedule. He typically woke at 7:00 and did not retire before 2:00 in the morning. Most of his day was spent on affairs of state, while his limited leisure time was devoted to reading and study. The Emperor went about his daily routine dressed in a simple black tail coat, trousers, and cravat. For special occasions he would wear court dress, and he only appeared in full regalia with crown, mantle, and scepter twice each year at the opening and closing of the General Assembly. Pedro II held politicians and government officials to the strict standards which he exemplified. The Emperor adopted a strict policy for the selection of civil servants based on morality and merit. To set the standard, he lived simply, once having said: "I also understand that useless expenditure is the same as stealing from the Nation". Balls and assemblies of the Court ceased after 1852. He also refused to request or allow his civil list amount of R$800,000 per year (US$405,000 or £90,000 in 1840) to be raised from the declaration of his majority until his dethronement almost fifty years later.

=== Patron of arts and sciences ===
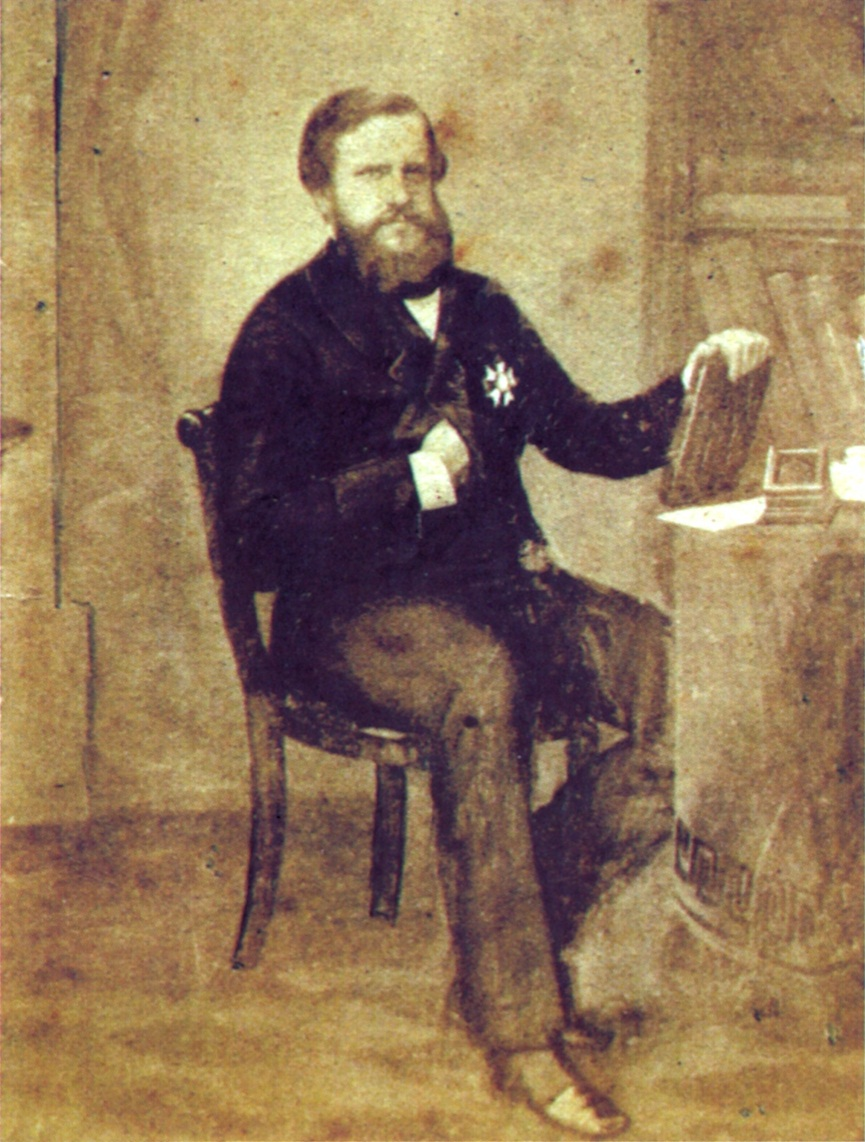
Pedro II around age 32, c.1858. In the 1850s, books begin to feature prominently in his portraits, a reference to his role as advocate for education.

"I was born to devote myself to culture and sciences," the Emperor remarked in his private journal during 1862. Subjects which interested Pedro II were wide-ranging, including anthropology, history, geography, geology, medicine, law, religious studies, philosophy, painting, sculpture, theater, music, chemistry, physics, astronomy, poetry, and technology among others. By the end of his reign, there were three libraries in São Cristóvão palace containing more than 60,000 books. A passion for linguistics prompted him throughout his life to study new languages, and he was able to speak and write not only Portuguese but also Latin, French, German, English, Italian, Spanish, Greek, Arabic, Hebrew, Sanskrit, Chinese, Occitan, and Tupi. He became the first Brazilian photographer when he acquired a daguerreotype camera in March 1840. He set up one laboratory in São Cristóvão devoted to photography and another to chemistry and physics. He also had an astronomical observatory constructed.

The Emperor considered education to be of national importance and was himself a concrete example of the value of learning. He remarked: "Were I not an Emperor, I would like to be a teacher. I do not know of a task more noble than to direct young minds and prepare the men of tomorrow." His reign saw the creation of the Brazilian Historic and Geographic Institute to promote research and preservation in the historical, geographical, cultural, and social sciences. The Imperial Academy of Music and National Opera and the Pedro II School were also founded, the latter serving as a model for schools throughout Brazil. The Imperial Academy of the Fine Arts, established by his father, received further strengthening and support. Using his civil list income, Pedro II provided scholarships for Brazilian students to study at universities, art schools, and conservatories of music in Europe. He also financed the creation of the Institute Pasteur, helped underwrite the construction of Wagner's Bayreuth Festspielhaus, as well as subscribing to similar projects. His efforts were recognized both at home and abroad. Charles Darwin said of him: "The Emperor does so much for science, that every scientific man is bound to show him the utmost respect".

Pedro II became a member of the Royal Society, the Russian Academy of Sciences, The Royal Academies for Science and the Arts of Belgium and the American Geographical Society. In 1875, he was elected to the French Academy of Sciences, an honor previously granted to only two other heads of state: Peter the Great and Napoleon Bonaparte. He exchanged letters with scientists, philosophers, musicians and other intellectuals. Many of his correspondents became his friends, including Richard Wagner, Louis Pasteur, Louis Agassiz, John Greenleaf Whittier, Michel Eugène Chevreul, Alexander Graham Bell, Henry Wadsworth Longfellow, Arthur de Gobineau, Frédéric Mistral, Alessandro Manzoni, Alexandre Herculano, Camilo Castelo Branco, and James Cooley Fletcher. His erudition amazed Friedrich Nietzsche when the two met. Victor Hugo told the Emperor: "Sire, you are a great citizen, you are the grandson of Marcus Aurelius," and Alexandre Herculano called him a "Prince whom the general opinion holds as the foremost of his era because of his gifted mind, and due to the constant application of that gift to the sciences and culture."

=== Clash with the British Empire ===
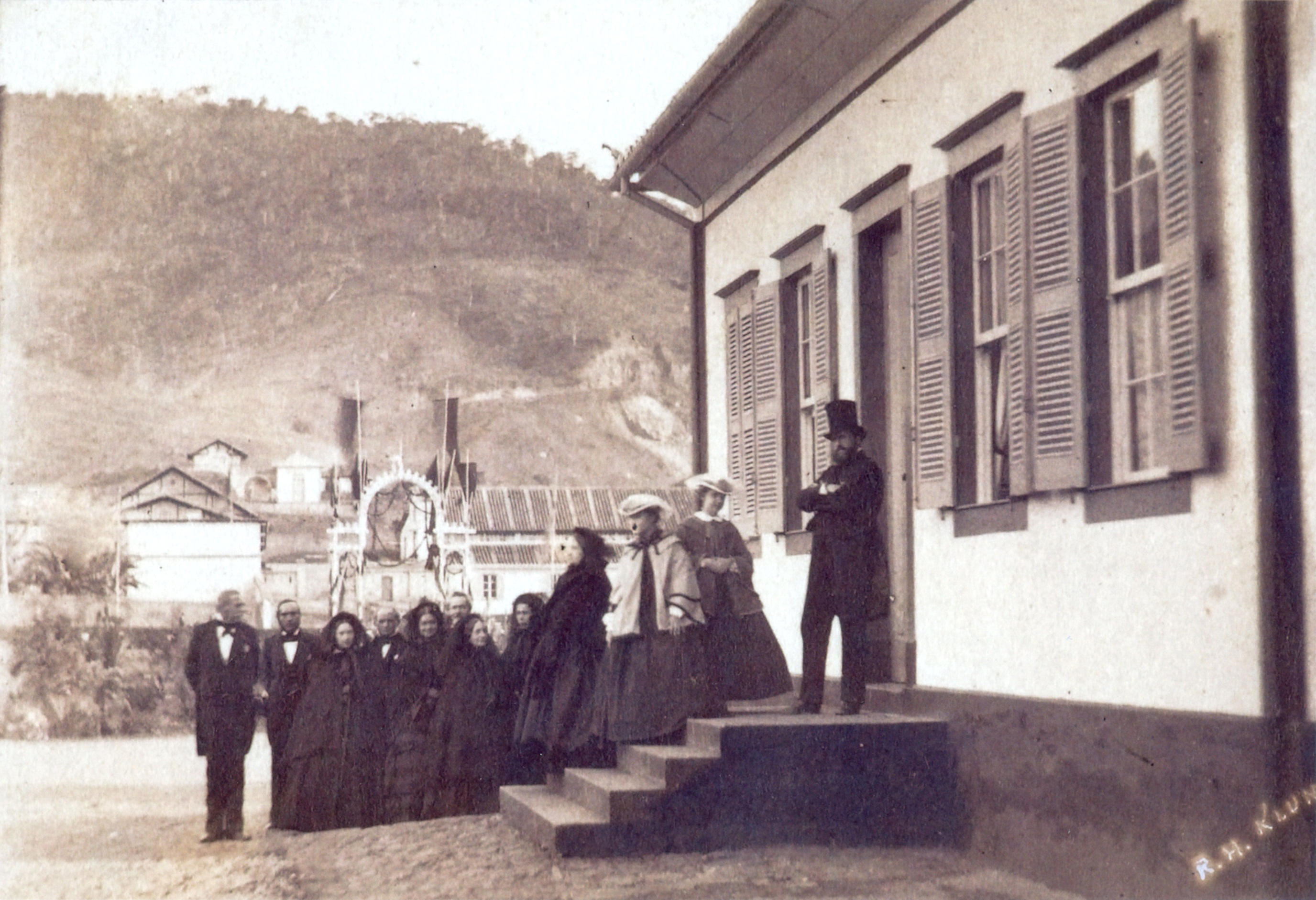
Pedro II at age 35 along with his wife and daughters visiting a farm in southern Minas Gerais province, 1861

At the end of 1859, Pedro II departed on a trip to provinces north of the capital, visiting Espírito Santo, Bahia, Sergipe, Alagoas, Pernambuco, and Paraíba. He returned in February 1860 after four months. The trip was a huge success, with the Emperor welcomed everywhere with warmth and joy. The first half of the 1860s saw peace and prosperity in Brazil. Civil liberties were maintained. Freedom of speech had existed since Brazil's independence and was strongly defended by Pedro II. He found newspapers from the capital and from the provinces an ideal way to keep track of public opinion and the nation's overall situation. Another means of monitoring the Empire was through direct contacts with his subjects. One opportunity for this was during regular Tuesday and Saturday public audiences, where anyone of any social class, including slaves, could gain admittance and present their petitions and stories. Visits to schools, colleges, prisons, exhibitions, factories, barracks, and other public appearances presented further opportunities to gather first-hand information.

This tranquility temporarily disappeared when the British consul in Rio de Janeiro, William Dougal Christie, nearly sparked a war between his nation and Brazil. Christie sent an ultimatum containing bullying demands arising out of two minor incidents at the end of 1861 and beginning of 1862. The first was the sinking of a British merchant barque on the coast of Rio Grande do Sul after which its goods were pillaged by local inhabitants. The second was the arrest of a group of drunken British sailors who were causing a disturbance in the streets of Rio.

The Brazilian government refused to yield, and Christie issued orders for British warships to capture Brazilian merchant vessels as indemnity. Brazil prepared for what was seen as an imminent conflict. Pedro II was the main reason for Brazil's resistance; he rejected any suggestion of yielding. This response came as a surprise to Christie, who changed his tenor and proposed a peaceful settlement through international arbitration. The Brazilian government presented its demands and, upon seeing the British government's position weaken, severed diplomatic ties with Britain in June 1863.

== Paraguayan War ==
=== First Fatherland Volunteer ===
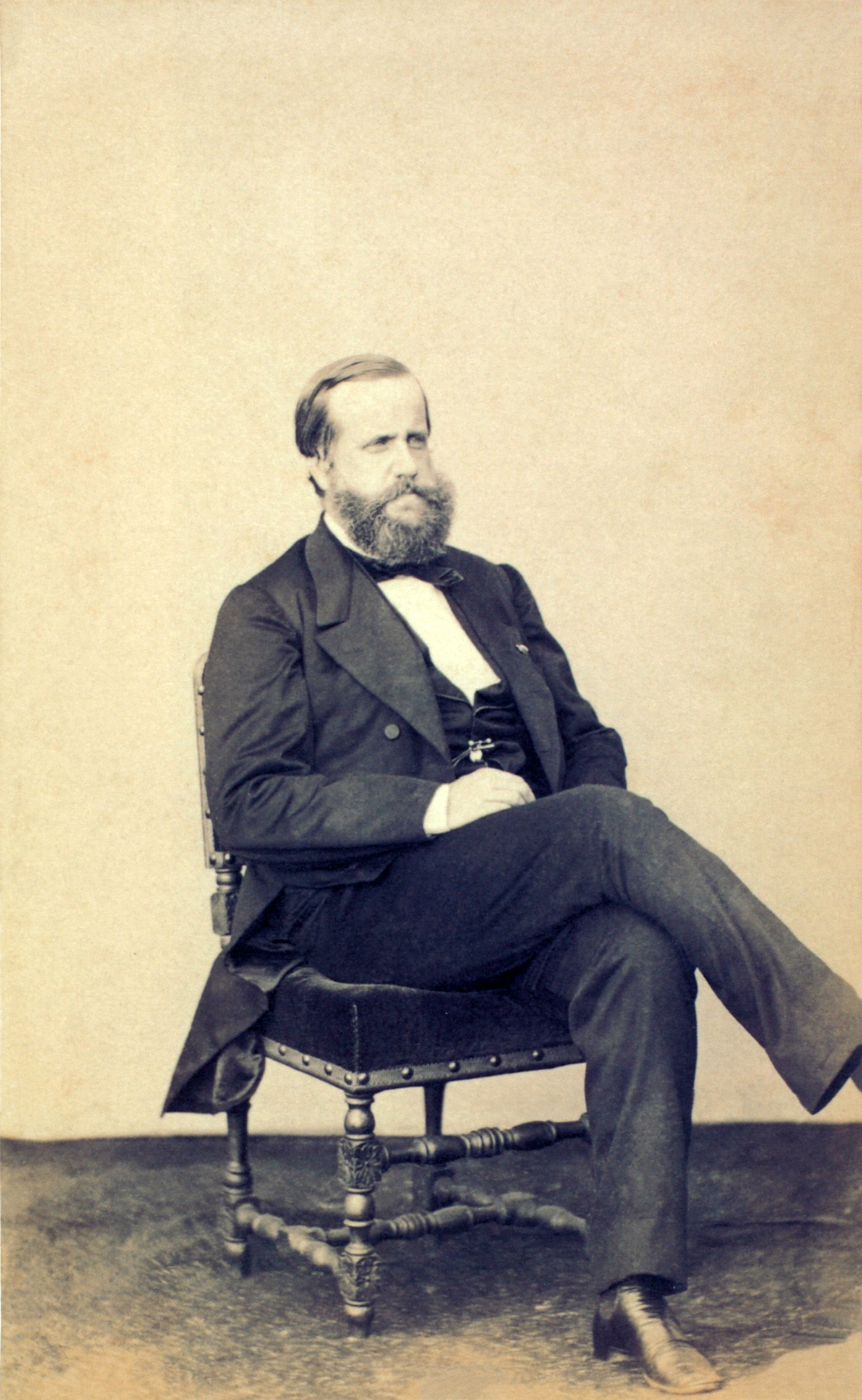
Pedro II at age 39, 1865

As war with the British Empire threatened, Brazil had to turn its attention to its southern frontiers. Another civil war had begun in Uruguay as its political parties turned against each other. The internal conflict led to the murder of Brazilians and looting of their property in Uruguay. Brazil's government decided to intervene, fearful of giving any impression of weakness in the face of conflict with the British. A Brazilian army invaded Uruguay in December 1864, beginning the brief Uruguayan War, which ended in February 1865. Meanwhile, the president of Paraguay, Francisco Solano López, took advantage of the situation to establish his country as a regional power. The Paraguayan Army invaded the Brazilian province of Mato Grosso (the area known after 1977 as the state of Mato Grosso do Sul), triggering the Paraguayan War. Four months later, Paraguayan troops invaded Argentine territory as a prelude to an attack on Rio Grande do Sul.

Aware of the anarchy in Rio Grande do Sul and the incapacity and incompetence of its military chiefs to resist the Paraguayan army, Pedro II decided to go to the front in person. Upon receiving objections from the cabinet, the General Assembly and the Council of State, Pedro II pronounced: "If they can prevent me from going as an Emperor, they cannot prevent me from abdicating and going as a Fatherland Volunteer"—an allusion to those Brazilians who volunteered to go to war and became known throughout the nation as the "Fatherland Volunteers". The monarch himself was popularly called the "number-one volunteer". Given permission to leave, Pedro II disembarked in Rio Grande do Sul in July and proceeded from there by land. He travelled overland by horse and wagon, sleeping at night in a campaign tent. In September, Pedro II arrived in Uruguaiana, a Brazilian town occupied by a besieged Paraguayan army.

The Emperor rode within rifle-shot of Uruguaiana, but the Paraguayans did not attack him. To avoid further bloodshed, he offered terms of surrender to the Paraguayan commander, who accepted. Pedro II's coordination of the military operations and his personal example played a decisive role in successfully repulsing the Paraguayan invasion of Brazilian territory. Before returning to Rio de Janeiro, he received the British diplomatic envoy Edward Thornton, who apologized on behalf of Queen Victoria and the British Government for the crisis between the empires. The Emperor regarded this diplomatic victory over the most powerful nation of the world as sufficient and renewed friendly relations.

=== Total victory and its heavy costs ===
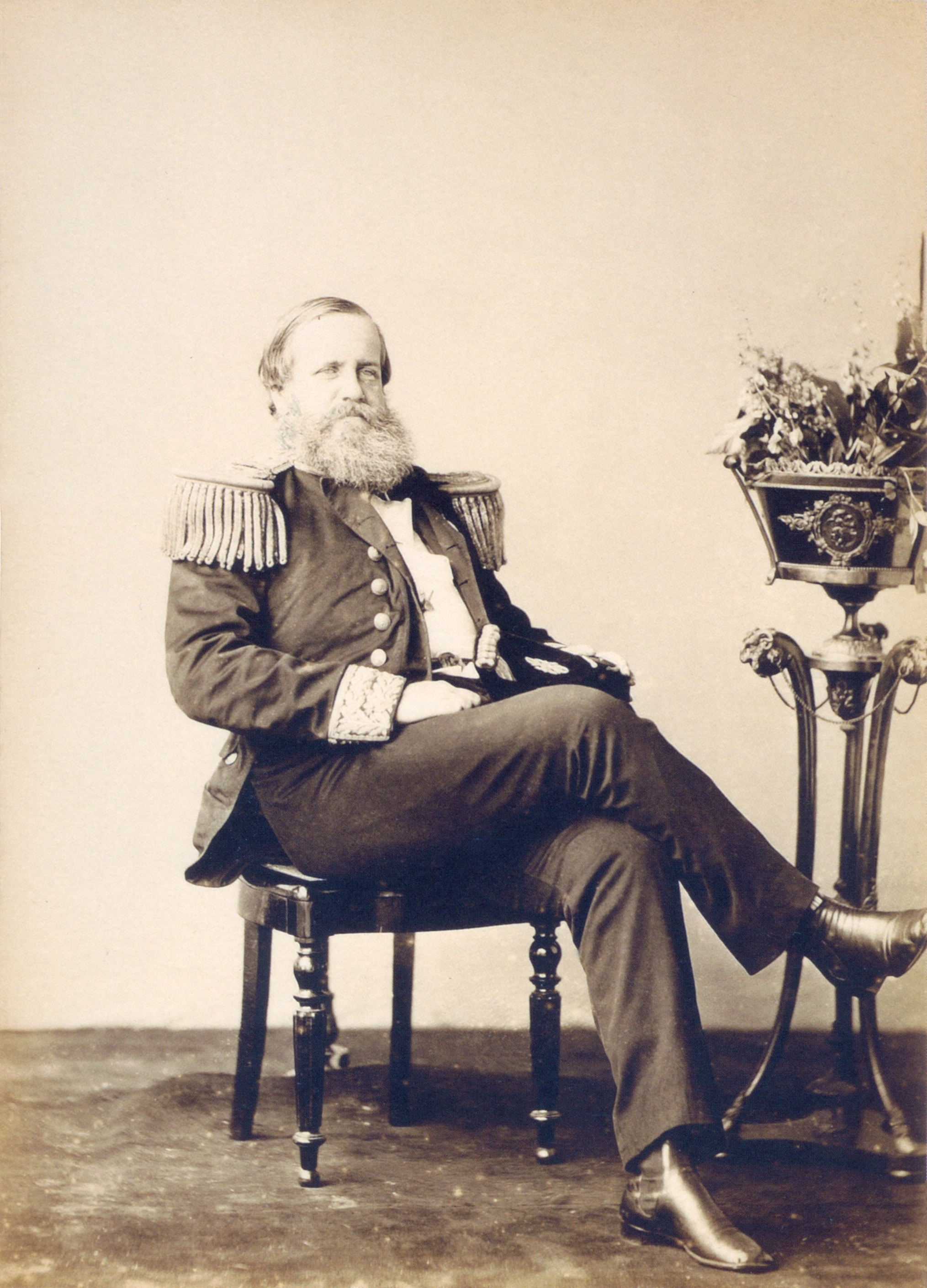
Dressed in an admiral's uniform at age 44, 1870—the war years had prematurely aged the Emperor

Against all expectations, the war continued for five years. During this period, Pedro II's time and energy were devoted to the war effort. He tirelessly worked to raise and equip troops to reinforce the front lines and to push forward the fitting of new warships for the navy. The rape of women, widespread violence against civilians, ransacking and destruction of properties that had occurred during Paraguay's invasion of Brazilian territory had made a deep impression on him. He warned the Countess of Barral in November 1866 that "the war should be concluded as honor demands, cost what it cost." "Difficulties, setbacks, and war-weariness had no effect on his quiet resolve", said Barman. Mounting casualties did not distract him from advancing what he saw as Brazil's righteous cause, and he stood prepared to personally sacrifice his own throne to gain an honorable outcome. Writing in his journal a few years previously Pedro II remarked: "What sort of fear could I have? That they take the government from me? Many better kings than I have lost it, and to me it is no more than the weight of a cross which it is my duty to carry."

At the same time, Pedro II worked to prevent quarrels between the national political parties from impairing the military response. The Emperor prevailed over a serious political crisis in July 1868 resulting from a quarrel between the cabinet and Luís Alves de Lima e Silva (then-Marques and later Duke of Caxias), the commander-in-chief of the Brazilian forces in Paraguay. Caxias was also a politician and was a member of the opposing party to the ministry. The Emperor sided with him, leading to the cabinet's resignation. As Pedro II maneuvered to bring about a victorious outcome in the conflict with Paraguay, he threw his support behind the political parties and factions that seemed to be most useful in the effort. The reputation of the monarchy was harmed and its trusted position as an impartial mediator was severely impacted in the long term. He was unconcerned for his personal position, and regardless of the impact upon the imperial system, he determined to put the national interest ahead of any potential harm caused by such expediencies.

His refusal to accept anything short of total victory was pivotal in the outcome. His tenacity was repaid with the news that López had died in battle on 1 March 1870, bringing the war to a close. Pedro II turned down the General Assembly's suggestion to erect an equestrian statue of him to commemorate the victory and chose instead to use the money to build elementary schools.

== Apogee ==
=== Abolitionism ===
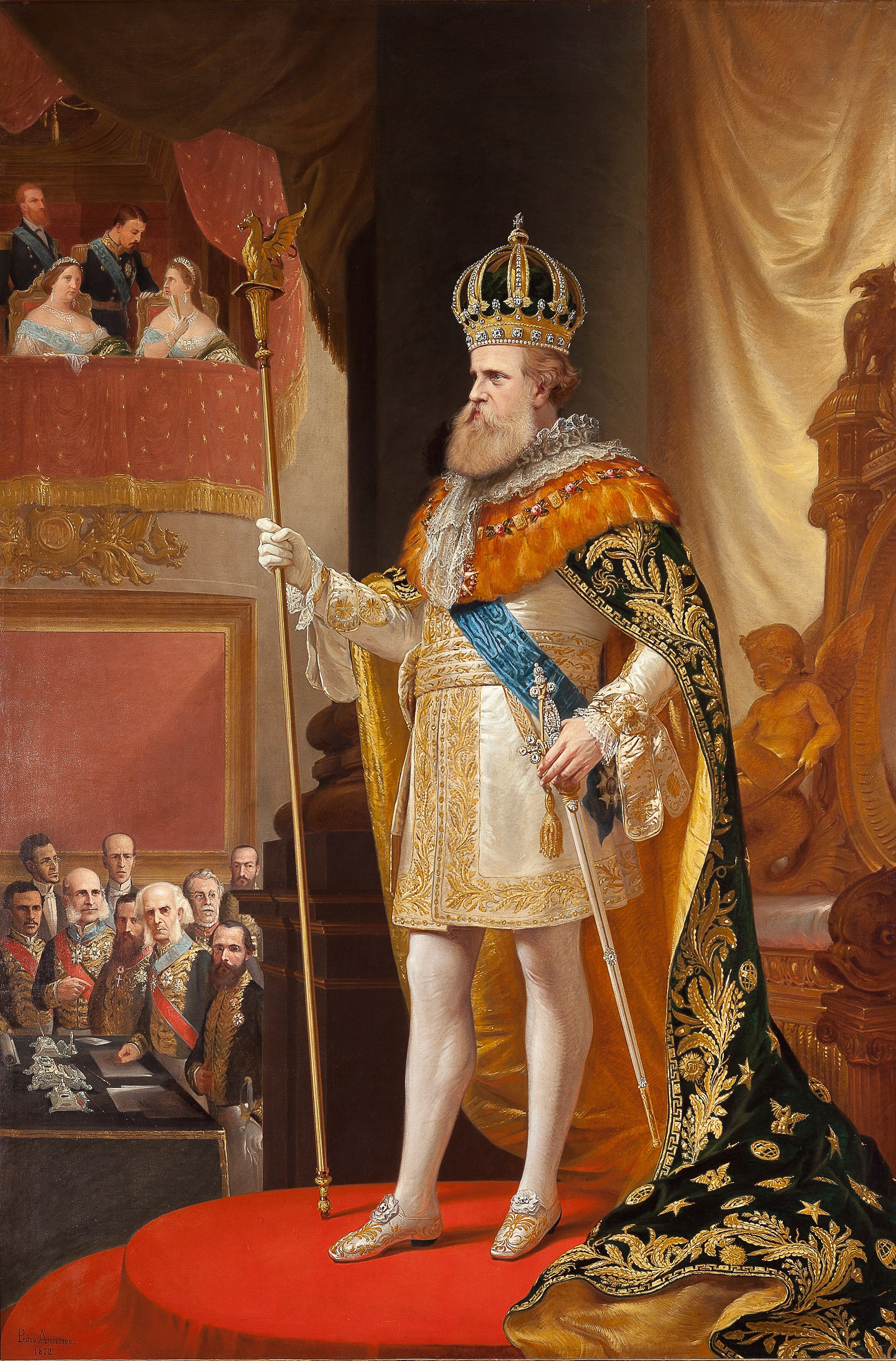
Pedro II at age 46 delivering the speech from the throne wearing the Imperial Regalia, 1872

In the 1870s, progress was made in both social and political spheres as segments of society benefited from the reforms and shared in the increasing prosperity. Brazil's international reputation for political stability and investment potential greatly improved. The Empire was seen as a modern and progressive nation unequaled, with the exception of the United States, in the Americas. The economy began growing rapidly and immigration flourished. Railroad, shipping and other modernization projects were adopted. With "slavery destined for extinction and other reforms projected, the prospects for 'moral and material advances' seemed vast."

In 1870, few Brazilians opposed slavery and even fewer openly condemned it. Pedro II, who did not own slaves, was one of the few who did oppose slavery. Its abolition was a delicate subject. Slaves were used by all classes, from the richest to the poorest. Pedro II wanted to end the practice gradually to soften the impact to the national economy. With no constitutional authority to directly intervene to abolish slavery, the Emperor would need to use all his skills to convince, influence, and gather support among politicians to achieve his goal. His first open move occurred back in 1850, when he threatened to abdicate unless the General Assembly declared the Atlantic slave trade illegal.

Having dealt with the overseas supply of new slaves, Pedro II turned his attention in the early 1860s to removing the remaining source: enslavement of children born to slaves. Legislation was drafted at his initiative, but the conflict with Paraguay delayed discussion of the proposal in the General Assembly. Pedro II openly asked for the gradual eradication of slavery in the speech from the throne of 1867. He was heavily criticized, and his move was condemned as "national suicide." Critics argued "that abolition was his personal desire and not that of the nation." He consciously ignored the growing political damage to his image and to the monarchy in consequence of his support for abolition. Eventually, a bill pushed through by Prime Minister José Paranhos, was enacted as the Law of Free Birth on 28 September 1871, under which all children born to slave women after that date were considered free born.

=== To Europe and North Africa ===
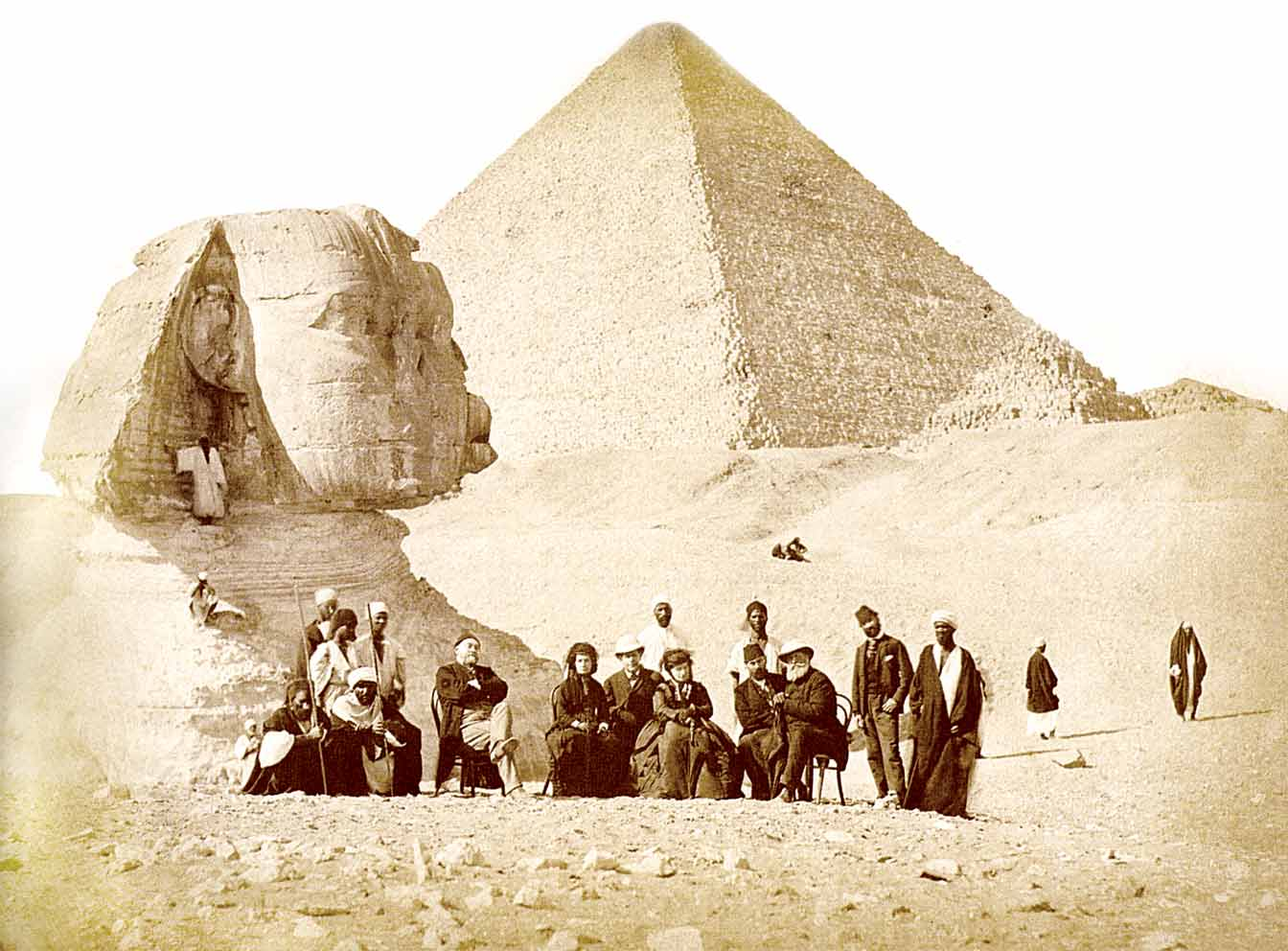
French archaeologist Auguste Mariette (seated, far left) and Pedro II (seated, far right) during the Emperor's visit to the Giza Necropolis at the end of 1871

On 25 May 1871, Pedro II and his wife traveled to Europe. He had long desired to vacation abroad. When news arrived that his younger daughter, the 23-year-old Leopoldina, had died in Vienna of typhoid fever on 7 February, he finally had a pressing reason to venture outside the Empire. Upon arriving in Lisbon, Portugal, he immediately went to the Janelas Verdes palace, where he met with his stepmother, Amélie of Leuchtenberg. The two had not seen each other in forty years, and the meeting was emotional. Pedro II remarked in his journal: "I cried from happiness and also from sorrow seeing my Mother so affectionate toward me but so aged and so sick."

The Emperor proceeded to visit Spain, Great Britain, Belgium, Germany, Austria, Italy, Egypt, Greece, Switzerland, and France. In Coburg, he visited his daughter's tomb. He found this to be "a time of release and freedom". He traveled under the assumed name "Dom Pedro de Alcântara", insisting upon being treated informally and staying only in hotels. He spent his days sightseeing and conversing with scientists and other intellectuals with whom he shared interests. The European sojourn proved to be a success, and his demeanor and curiosity won respectful notices in the nations which he visited. The prestige of both Brazil and Pedro II were further enhanced during the tour when news came from Brazil that the Law of Free Birth, abolishing the last source of enslavement, had been ratified. The imperial party returned to Brazil in triumph on 31 March 1872.

=== Religious Issue ===
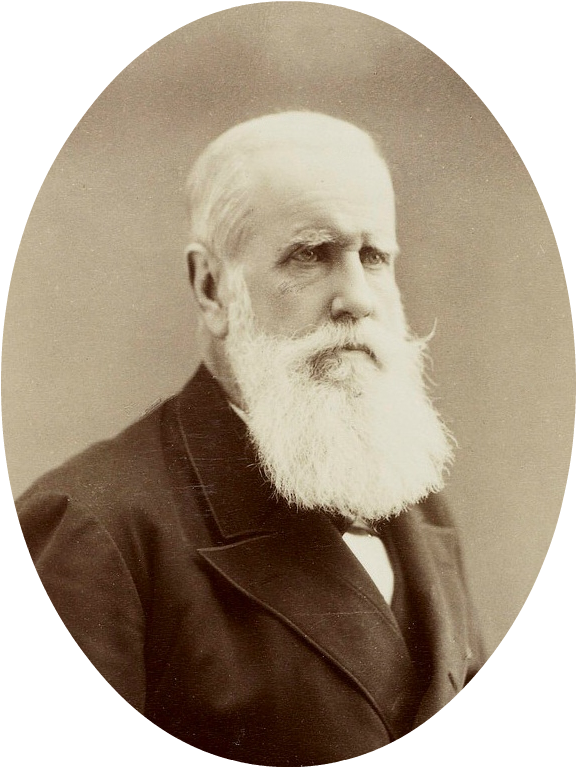
Pedro, c. 1887

Soon after returning to Brazil, Pedro II was faced with an unexpected crisis. The Brazilian clergy had long been understaffed, undisciplined and poorly educated, leading to a great loss of respect for the Catholic Church. The imperial government had embarked upon a program of reform to address these deficiencies. As Catholicism was the state religion, the government exercised a great deal of control over Church affairs, paying clerical salaries, appointing parish priests, nominating bishops, ratifying papal bulls and overseeing seminaries. In pursuing reform, the government selected bishops who satisfied its criteria for education, support for reform and moral fitness. However, as more capable men began to fill the clerical ranks, resentment of government control over the Church increased.

The bishops of Olinda and Belém (in the provinces of Pernambuco and Pará, respectively) were two of the new generation of educated and zealous Brazilian clerics. They had been influenced by the ultramontanism, which spread among Catholics in this period. In 1872, they ordered Freemasons expelled from lay brotherhoods. While European Freemasonry often tended towards anti-clericalism, things were much different in Brazil where membership in Masonic orders was common—although Pedro II himself was not a Freemason. The government headed by the Viscount of Rio Branco tried on two separate occasions to persuade the bishops to repeal, but they refused. This led to their trial and conviction by the Superior Court of Justice. In 1874, they were sentenced four years at hard labor, although the Emperor commuted this to imprisonment only.

Pedro II played a decisive role by unequivocally backing the government's actions. He was a conscientious adherent of Catholicism, which he viewed as advancing important civilizing and civic values. While he avoided anything that could be considered unorthodox, he felt free to think and behave independently. The Emperor accepted new ideas, such as Charles Darwin's theory of evolution, of which he remarked that "the laws that he [Darwin] has discovered glorify the Creator". He was moderate in his religious beliefs but could not accept disrespect to civil law and government authority. As he told his son-in-law: "[The government] has to ensure that the constitution is obeyed. In these proceedings there is no desire to protect masonry; but rather the goal of upholding the rights of the civilian power." The crisis was resolved in September 1875 after the Emperor grudgingly agreed to grant full amnesty to the bishops and the Holy See annulled the interdicts.

=== To the United States, Europe, and Middle East ===
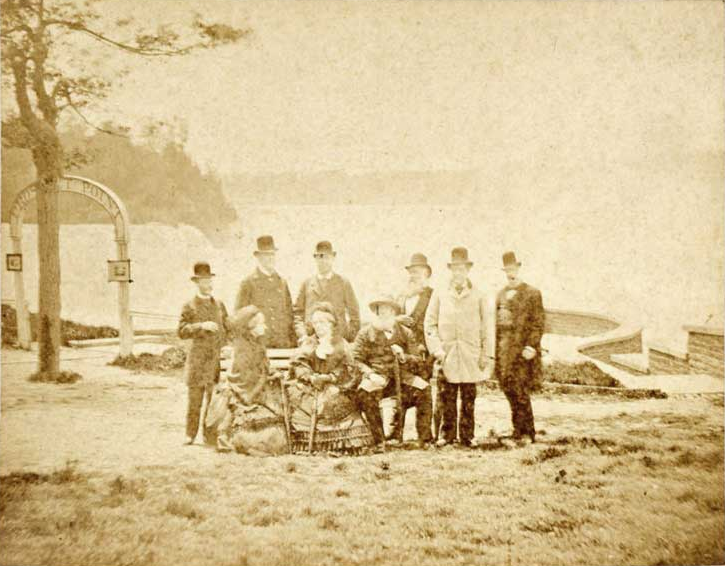
Pedro II (seated, right) at Niagara Falls, 1876

Once again, the Emperor traveled abroad, this time going to the United States for the Centennial Exposition of the Declaration of Independence. He was accompanied by his faithful servant Rafael, who had raised him from childhood. Pedro II arrived in New York City on 15 April 1876, and set out from there to travel throughout the country; going as far as San Francisco in the west, New Orleans in the south, Washington, D.C., and north to Toronto, Ontario, Canada. The trip was "an unalloyed triumph", Pedro II making a deep impression on the American people with his simplicity and kindness and making him a favorite with the US press who dubbed him "the Yankee Emperor." He then crossed the Atlantic, where he visited Denmark, Sweden, Finland, Russia, the Ottoman Empire, Greece, the Holy Land, Egypt, Italy, Austria, Germany, France, Britain, Ireland, the Netherlands, Switzerland, and Portugal. He returned to Brazil on 22 September 1877.

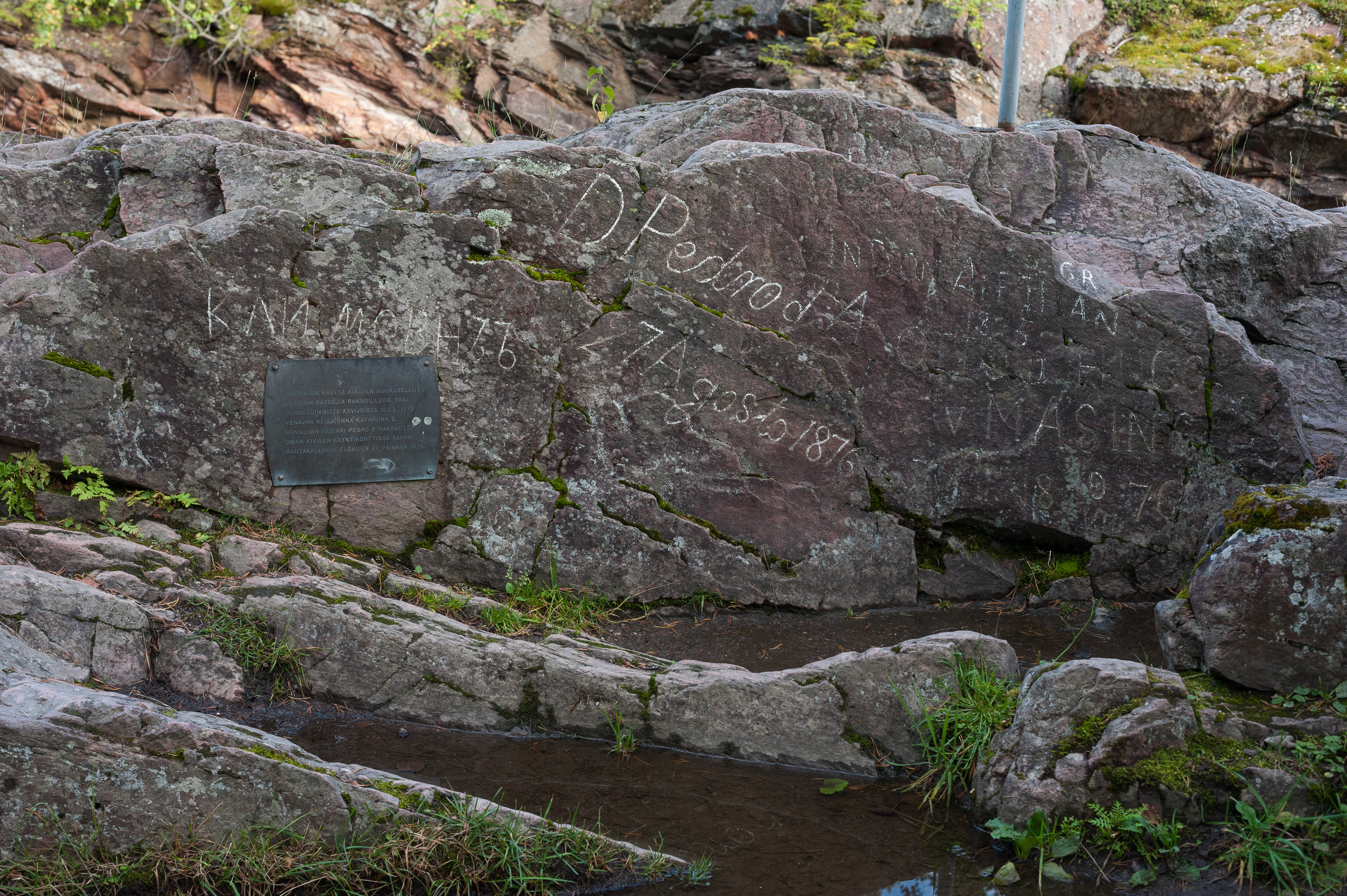
Engraved signature by Pedro II while visiting the Imatrankoski rapids in Imatra, Finland; 1876.

Pedro II's trips abroad made a deep psychological impact. While traveling, he was largely freed of the restrictions imposed by his office. Under the pseudonym "Pedro de Alcântara", he enjoyed moving about as an ordinary person, even taking a train journey solely with his wife. Only while touring abroad could the Emperor shake off the formal existence and demands of the life he knew in Brazil. It became more difficult to reacclimate to his routine as head of state upon returning. Upon his sons' early deaths, the Emperor's faith in the monarchy's future had evaporated. His trips abroad now made him resentful of the emperorship assigned to him at the age of five. If he previously had no interest in securing the throne for the next generation, he now had no desire to keep it going during his own lifetime.

== Decline and fall ==
=== Decline ===
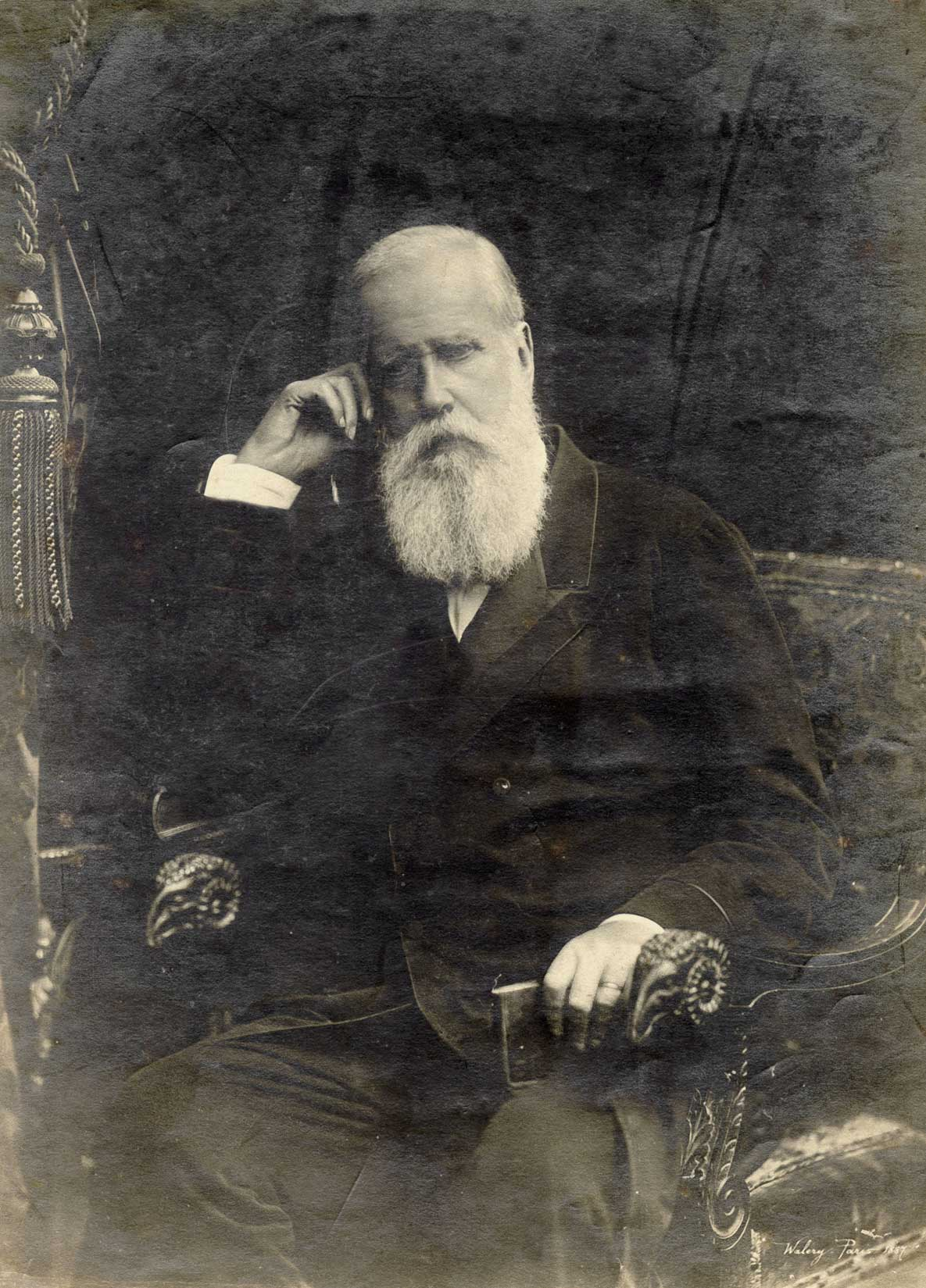
Pedro II at age 61, in 1887. He became tired of the monarchy and resigned to its demise

During the 1880s, Brazil continued to prosper, and social diversity increased markedly, including the first organized push for women's rights. On the other hand, letters written by Pedro II reveal a man grown world-weary with age and having an increasingly alienated and pessimistic outlook. He remained respectful of his duty and was meticulous in performing the tasks demanded of the imperial office, albeit often without enthusiasm. Because of his increasing "indifference towards the fate of the regime" and his lack of action in support of the imperial system once it was challenged, historians have attributed the "prime, perhaps sole, responsibility" for the dissolution of the monarchy to the Emperor himself.

After their experience of the perils and obstacles of government, the political figures who had arisen during the 1830s saw the Emperor as providing a fundamental source of authority essential for governing and for national survival. These elder statesmen began to die off or retire from government until, by the 1880s, they had almost entirely been replaced by a newer generation of politicians who had no experience of the early years of Pedro II's reign. They had only known a stable administration and prosperity and saw no reason to uphold and defend the imperial office as a unifying force beneficial to the nation. To them, Pedro II was merely an old and increasingly sick man who had steadily eroded his position by taking an active role in politics for decades. Before he had been above criticism, but now his every action and inaction prompted meticulous scrutiny and open criticism. Many young politicians had become apathetic toward the monarchic regime and, when the time came, they would do nothing to defend it. Pedro II's achievements went unremembered and unconsidered by the ruling elites. By his very success, the Emperor had made his position seem unnecessary.

The lack of an heir who could feasibly provide a new direction for the nation also diminished the long-term prospects of the Brazilian monarchy. The Emperor loved his daughter Isabel, but he considered the idea of a female successor as antithetical to the role required of Brazil's ruler. He viewed the death of his two sons as being a sign that the Empire was destined to be supplanted. Resistance to accepting a female ruler was also shared by the political establishment. Even though the Constitution allowed female succession to the throne, Brazil was still very traditional, and only a male successor was thought capable as head of state.

=== Abolition of slavery and coup d'état ===
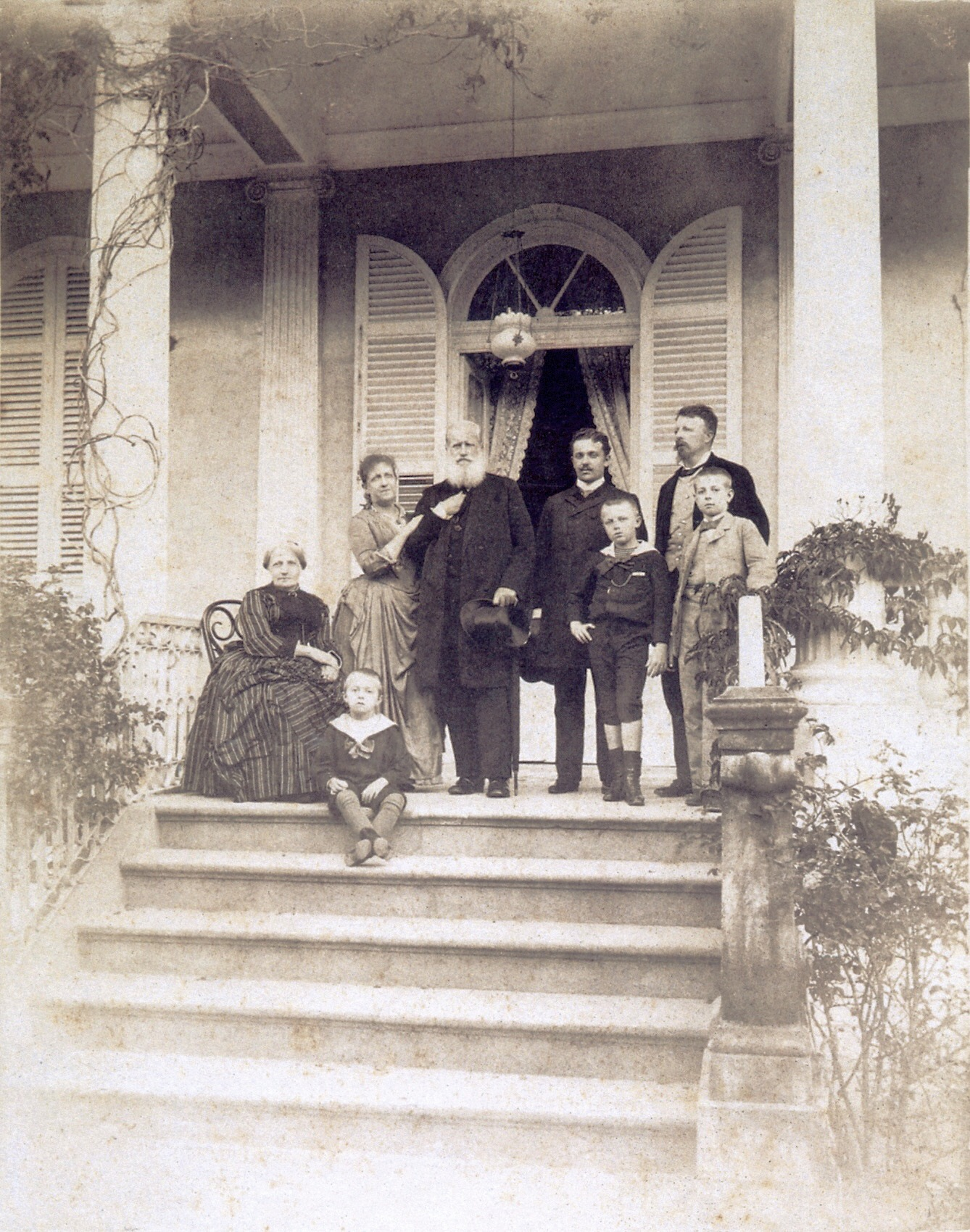
The last picture of the imperial family in Brazil, 1889

By June 1887, the Emperor's health had considerably worsened, and his personal doctors suggested going to Europe for medical treatment. While in Milan he passed two weeks between life and death, even being anointed. While on a bed recovering, on 22 May 1888 he received news that slavery had been abolished in Brazil. With a weak voice and tears in his eyes, he said, "Great people! Great people!" Pedro II returned to Brazil and disembarked in Rio de Janeiro in August 1888. The "whole country welcomed him with an enthusiasm never seen before. From the capital, from the provinces, from everywhere, arrived proofs of affection and veneration." With the devotion expressed by Brazilians upon the return of the Emperor and the Empress from Europe, the monarchy seemed to enjoy unshakable support and to be at the height of its popularity.

The nation enjoyed great international prestige during the final years of the Empire, and it had become an emerging power within the international arena. Predictions of economic and labor disruption caused by the abolition of slavery failed to materialize and the 1888 coffee harvest was successful. The end of slavery had resulted in an explicit shift of support to republicanism by rich and powerful coffee farmers who held great political, economic, and social power in the country. Republicanism was an elitist creed which never flourished in Brazil, with little support in the provinces. The combination of republican ideas and the dissemination of positivism among the army's lower and medium officer ranks led to indiscipline among the corps and became a serious threat to the monarchy. They dreamed of a dictatorial republic, which they believed would be superior to the monarchy.

Although there was no desire in Brazil among the majority of the population to change the form of government, the civilian republicans began pressuring army officers to overthrow the monarchy. They launched a coup d'état, arrested Prime Minister Afonso Celso, Viscount of Ouro Preto and instituted the republic on 15 November 1889. The few people who witnessed what occurred did not realize that it was a rebellion. Historian Lídia Besouchet noted that "[r]arely has a revolution been so minor." During the ordeal, Pedro II showed no emotion as if unconcerned about the outcome. He dismissed all suggestions for quelling the rebellion that politicians and military leaders put forward. When he heard the news of his deposition he simply commented: "If it is so, it will be my retirement. I have worked too hard and I am tired. I will go rest then." He and his family were sent into exile in Europe on 17 November.

== Exile and legacy ==
=== Last years ===
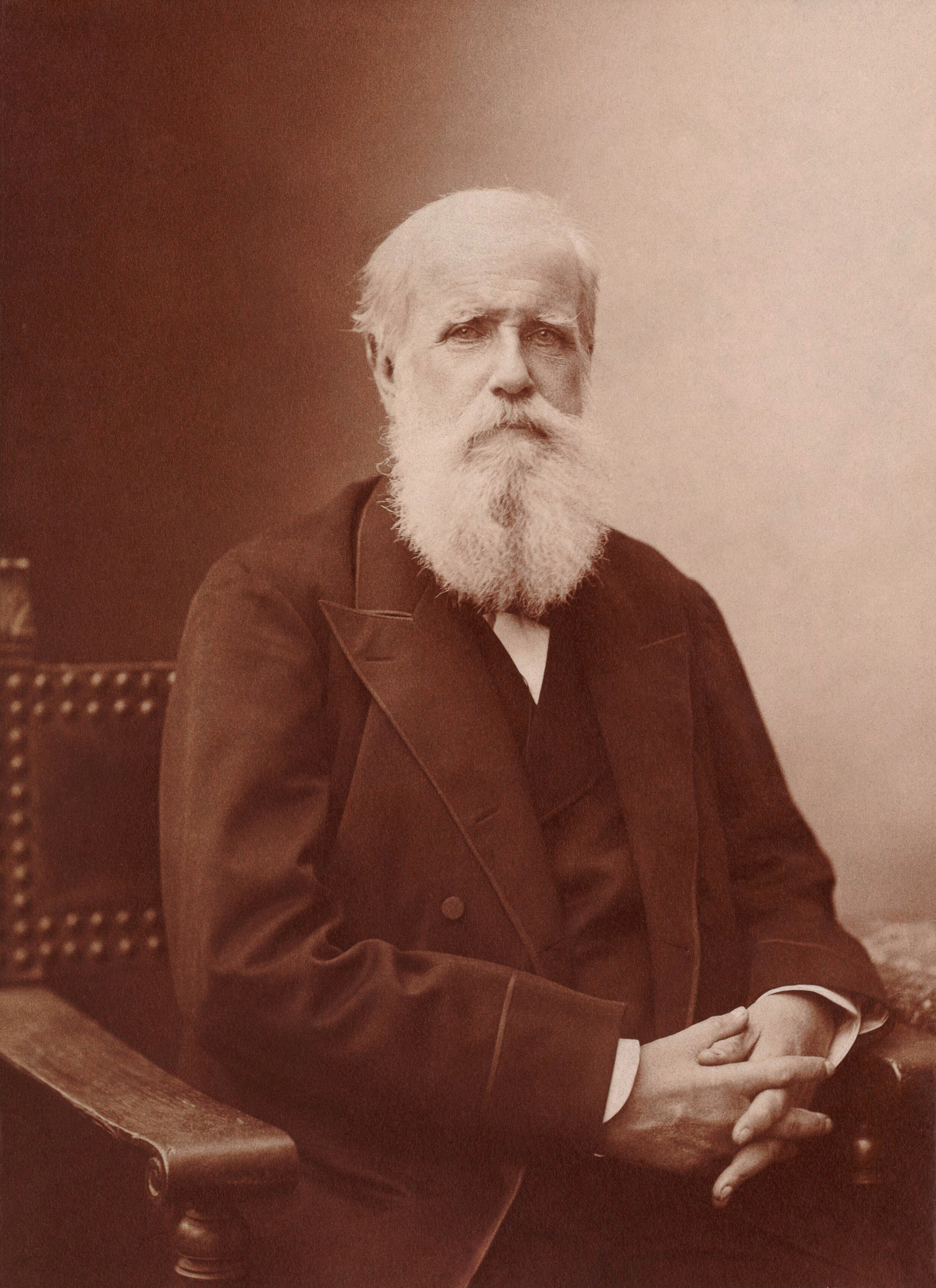
Photograph by Nadar, 1891

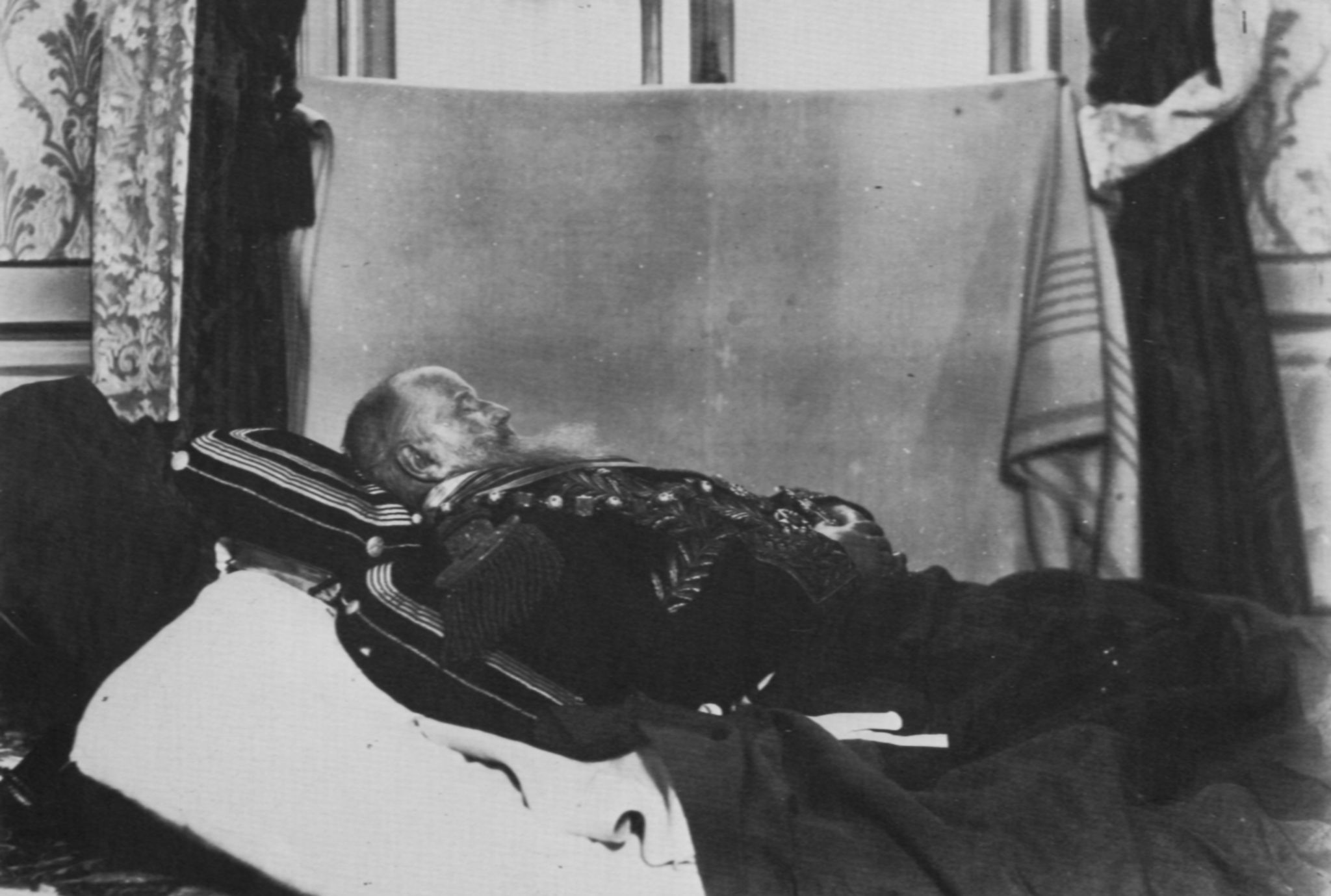
Pedro, clad in court dress uniform, on his bier, 6 December 1891: the book beneath the pillow under his head symbolized that his mind rests upon knowledge even in death

Teresa Cristina died three weeks after their arrival in Europe, and Isabel and her family moved to another place while Pedro settled first in Cannes and later in Paris. Pedro's last couple of years were lonely and melancholic, as he lived in modest hotels without money and writing in his journal of dreams in which he was allowed to return to Brazil. He never supported a restoration of the monarchy, once stating that he had no desire "to return to the position which I occupied, especially not by means of conspiracy of any sort." One day he caught an infection that progressed quickly into pneumonia. Pedro rapidly declined and died at 00:35 on 5 December 1891 surrounded by his family. His last words were "May God grant me these last wishes—peace and prosperity for Brazil". While the body was being prepared, a sealed package in the room was found, and next to it a message written by the Emperor himself: "It is soil from my country, I wish it to be placed in my coffin in case I die away from my fatherland."

Isabel wished to hold a discreet and private burial ceremony, but she eventually agreed to the French government's request for a state funeral. On 9 December, thousands of mourners attended the ceremony at La Madeleine. Aside from Pedro's family, these included: Francesco II, former king of the Two Sicilies; Isabel II, former queen of Spain; Philippe, comte de Paris; and other members of European royalty. Also present were General Joseph Brugère, representing President Sadi Carnot; the presidents of the Senate and the Chamber of Deputies as well as their members; diplomats; and other representatives of the French government. Nearly all members of the Institut de France were in attendance. Other governments from the Americas and Europe sent representatives, as did the Ottoman Empire, Persia, China, and Japan. Following the services, the coffin was taken in procession to the railway station to begin its trip to Portugal. Around 300,000 people lined the route under incessant rain and cold. The journey continued on to the Church of São Vicente de Fora near Lisbon, where the body of Pedro was interred in the Royal Pantheon of the House of Braganza on 12 December.

The Brazilian republican government, "fearful of a backlash resulting from the death of the Emperor", banned any official reaction. Nevertheless, Brazilians were not indifferent to Pedro's death, and "repercussions in Brazil were also immense, despite the government's effort to suppress. There were demonstrations of sorrow throughout the country: shuttered business activity, flags displayed at half-staff, black armbands on clothes, death knells, religious ceremonies." Masses were held in memory of Pedro throughout Brazil, and he and the monarchy were praised in the eulogies that followed.

=== Legacy ===
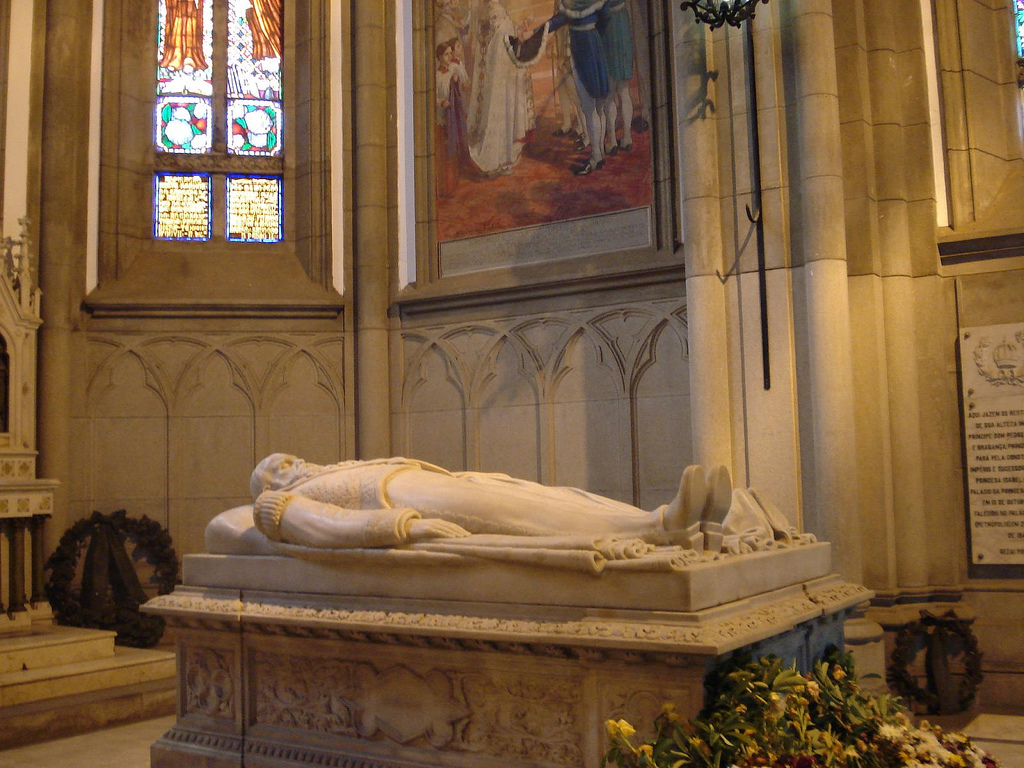
Tomb of Pedro II and Teresa Cristina in the Cathedral of Petrópolis, Brazil

After his fall, Brazilians remained attached to the Emperor, who was still a popular and highly praised figure. This view was even stronger among those of African descent, who equated the monarchy with freedom because of his and his daughter Isabel's part in the abolition of slavery. The continued support for the deposed monarch is largely credited to a generally held and unextinguished belief that he was a truly "wise, benevolent, austere and honest ruler", said historian Ricardo Salles. The positive view of Pedro II, and nostalgia for his reign, only grew as the nation quickly fell into a series of economic and political crises which Brazilians attributed to the Emperor's overthrow.

Strong feelings of guilt manifested among republicans, and these became increasingly evident upon the Emperor's death in exile. They praised Pedro II, who was seen as a model of republican ideals, and the imperial era, which they believed should be regarded as an example to be followed by the young republic. In Brazil, the news of the Emperor's death "aroused a genuine sense of regret among those who, without sympathy for a restoration, acknowledged both the merits and the achievements of their deceased ruler." His remains, as well as those of his wife, were returned to Brazil in 1921 in time for the centenary of the Brazilian independence. The government granted Pedro II dignities befitting a head of state. A national holiday was declared and the return of the Emperor as a national hero was celebrated throughout the country. Thousands attended the main ceremony in Rio de Janeiro where, according to historian Pedro Calmon, the "elderly people cried. Many knelt down. All clapped hands. There was no distinction between republicans and monarchists. They were all Brazilians." This homage marked the reconciliation of Republican Brazil with its monarchical past.

Historians have expressed high regard for Pedro II and his reign. The scholarly literature dealing with him is vast and, with the exception of the period immediately after his ousting, overwhelmingly positive, and even laudatory. He has been regarded by several historians in Brazil as the greatest Brazilian. In a manner similar to methods which were used by republicans, historians point to the Emperor's virtues as an example to be followed, although none go so far as to advocate a restoration of the monarchy. Historian Richard Graham noted that "[m]ost twentieth-century historians, moreover, have looked back on the period [of Pedro II's reign] nostalgically, using their descriptions of the Empire to criticize—sometimes subtly, sometimes not—Brazil's subsequent republican or dictatorial regimes."

== Titles and honors ==
Styles of Pedro II, Emperor of Brazil
- Reference style: His Imperial Majesty
- Spoken style: Your Imperial Majesty
- Alternative style: Sire

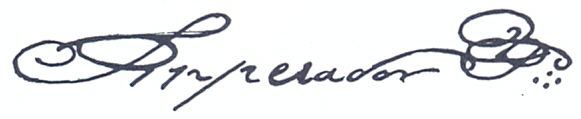
Pedro II's signature in official documents

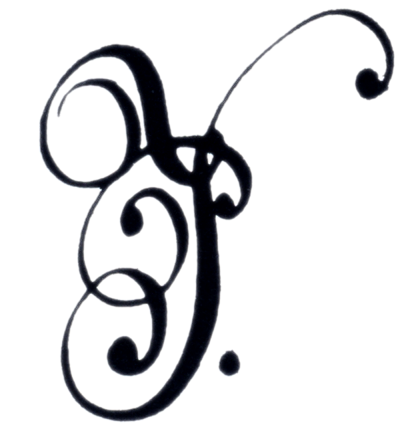
His signed initials in official documents

=== Titles and styles ===
The Emperor's full style and title were "His Imperial Majesty Dom Pedro II, by the Grace of God, and Unanimous Acclamation of the People, Constitutional Emperor and Perpetual Defender of Brazil" (Sua Majestade Imperial, Dom Pedro II, Pela Graça de Deus, e Unânime Aclamação dos Povos, Imperador Constitucional e Defensor Perpétuo do Brasil).

=== Honors ===
National Honors

Emperor Pedro II was Grand Master of the following Brazilian Imperial Orders:

- Imperial Order of Our Lord Jesus Christ
- Imperial Order of Saint Benedict of Aviz
- Imperial Order of Saint James of the Sword
- Imperial Order of the Cross
- Imperial Order of Dom Pedro I
- Imperial Order of the Rose

Foreign Honors

- Grand Cross of the Austro-Hungarian Order of Saint Stephen
- Grand Cordon of the Belgian Order of Leopold
- Grand Cross of the Romanian Order of the Star
- Knight of the Danish Order of the Elephant
- Knight of the Order of Saint Januarius of the Two Sicilies
- Grand Cross of the Order of Saint Ferdinand and of Merit of the Two Sicilies
- Grand Cross of the French Légion d'honneur
- Grand Cross of the Greek Order of the Redeemer
- Grand Cross of the Dutch Order of the Netherlands Lion
- Knight of the Spanish Order of the Golden Fleece
- Stranger Knight Companion of the British Order of the Garter
- Grand Cross of the Order of Malta
- Grand Cross of the Order of the Holy Sepulchre
- Senator Grand Cross with Collar of the Sacred Military Constantinian Order of Saint George of Parma
- Grand Cross of the Portuguese Order of the Immaculate Conception of Vila Viçosa
- Grand Cross of the Portuguese Order of the Tower and Sword
- Knight of the Prussian Order of the Black Eagle
- Knight 1st Class of all Russian orders of chivalry
- Knight of the Sardinian Order of the Most Holy Annunciation
- Knight of the Swedish Royal Order of the Seraphim
- Commander Grand Cross of the Swedish Order of the Polar Star
- Member 1st Class of the Ottoman Order of the Medjidie
- Knight of the House Order of Fidelity of Baden
- Knight of the Order of Berthold the First of Baden
- Knight of the Bavarian Order of Saint Hubert
- Grand Cross of the Order of Ernest the Pious
- Grand Cross of the Order of the White Falcon of Saxe-Weimar
- Knight of the Saxon Order of the Rue Crown
- Grand Cross with Collar of the Imperial Order of the Mexican Eagle
- Grand Cross of the Order of Saint Charles of Monaco

== Genealogy ==
=== Ancestry ===
The ancestry of Emperor Pedro II:

Ancestors of Pedro II of Brazil

8. Peter III of Portugal
4. John VI of Portugal and Brazil
9. Maria I of Portugal and Brazil
2. Pedro I of Brazil
10. Charles IV of Spain
5. Carlota Joaquina of Spain
11. Maria Luisa of Parma
1. Pedro II of Brazil
12. Leopold II, Holy Roman Emperor
6. Francis II, Holy Roman Emperor
13. Maria Luisa of Spain
3. Maria Leopoldina of Austria
14. Ferdinand I of the Two Sicilies
7. Maria Theresa of Naples and Sicily
15. Maria Carolina of Austria

=== Issue ===
Name	Portrait	Lifespan	Notes
By Teresa Cristina of the Two Sicilies (14 March 1822 – 28 December 1889; married by proxy on 30 May 1843)
Afonso, Prince Imperial of Brazil	Oil portrait of the Prince Imperial as a blond-haired child in a white frock with lace at the neck and official blue sash	23 February 1845 – 11 June 1847	Prince Imperial of Brazil from birth to his death.
Isabel, Princess Imperial of Brazil	Half-length photographic portrait of a young lady in profile with light-colored hair held back by a dark velvet ribbon and wearing a Victorian-style dress of lace with a cameo on a dark ribbon around her neck	29 July 1846 – 14 November 1921	Princess Imperial of Brazil and Countess of Eu through marriage to Gaston d'Orléans. She had four children from this marriage. She also acted as Regent of the Empire while her father was traveling abroad.
Princess Leopoldina of Brazil	Half-length photographic portrait of a young lady with light-colored hair swept back and wearing a high-necked, dark Victorian era satin dress with dark buttons	13 July 1847 – 7 February 1871	Married Prince Ludwig August of Saxe-Coburg and Gotha with four sons resulting from this marriage.
Pedro Afonso, Prince Imperial of Brazil	A painting of a blond toddler in a white dress being supported by another child wearing a blue dress.	19 July 1848 – 9 January 1850	Prince Imperial of Brazil from birth to his death.

== See also ==
- Dom Pedro aquamarine, named after Pedro II and his father, is the world's largest cut aquamarine gem.

== References and further reading ==
- Barman, Roderick J. (1999). Citizen Emperor: Pedro II and the making of Brazil, 1825–1891. Stanford: Stanford University Press. ISBN 978-0-8047-3510-0.
- Barman, Roderick J. (2002). Princess Isabel of Brazil: gender and power in the nineteenth century. Rowman & Littlefield Publishers. ISBN 978-0842028462.
- Bethell, Leslie (1993). Brazil: Empire and Republic, 1822–1930. Cambridge, United Kingdom: Cambridge University Press. ISBN 978-0-521-36293-1.
- Graham, Richard (1994). Patronage and Politics in Nineteenth-Century Brazil. Stanford: Stanford University Press. ISBN 978-0-8047-2336-7.
- Kurizky, Patricia Shu, et al. "The physician, the Emperor and the fibromyalgia: Charles-Édouard Brown-Séquard (1817–1894) and Dom Pedro II (1825–1891) of Brazil." Journal of medical biography 24.1 (2016): 45–50. online
- Levine, Robert M. (1999). The History of Brazil. Westport, Connecticut: Greenwood Press. ISBN 978-0-313-30390-6.
- Montgomery-Massingberd, Hugh, ed. (1977). Burke's Royal Families of the World (1st ed.). London: Burke's Peerage. ISBN 0-85011-023-8.
- Munro, Dana Gardner (1942). The Latin American Republics: A History. New York: D. Appleton.
- Skidmore, Thomas E. (1986). "Brazil's American Illusion: From Dom Pedro II to the Coup of 1964". Luso-Brazilian Review. 23 (2). Madison, Wisconsin: University of Wisconsin Press: 73. JSTOR 3513241.
- Skidmore, Thomas E. (1999). Brazil: five centuries of change. New York: Oxford University Press. ISBN 978-0-19-505809-3.
- Topik, Steven C. (2000). Trade and Gunboats: The United States and Brazil in the Age of Empire. Stanford: Stanford University Press. ISBN 978-0-8047-4018-0.
- Williams, Mary Wilhelmine (1937). Dom Pedro, the Magnanimous, second Emperor of Brazil. Chapel Hill: U. of North Carolina Press.

=== In Portuguese ===
- Benevides, José Marijeso de Alencar; Azevedo, Rubens de; Alcântara, José Denizard Macedo de (1979). D. Pedro II, patrono da astronomia brasileira (in Portuguese). Fortaleza: Imprensa oficial do Ceará.
- Besouchet, Lídia (1993). Pedro II e o Século XIX (in Portuguese) (2nd ed.). Rio de Janeiro: Nova Fronteira. ISBN 978-85-209-0494-7.
- Calmon, Pedro (1975). História de D. Pedro II (in Portuguese). Vol. 1–5. Rio de Janeiro: José Olímpio.
- Carvalho, José Murilo de (2007). D. Pedro II: ser ou não ser (in Portuguese). São Paulo: Companhia das Letras. ISBN 978-85-359-0969-2.
- Doratioto, Francisco (2002). Maldita Guerra: Nova história da Guerra do Paraguai (in Portuguese). São Paulo: Companhia das Letras. ISBN 978-85-359-0224-2.
- Ermakoff, George (2006). Rio de Janeiro – 1840–1900 – Uma crônica fotográfica (in Portuguese). Rio de Janeiro: G. Ermakoff Casa Editorial. ISBN 978-85-98815-05-3.
- Lira, Heitor (1977). História de Dom Pedro II (1825–1891): Ascenção (1825–1870) (in Portuguese). Vol. 1. Belo Horizonte: Itatiaia.
- Lira, Heitor (1977). História de Dom Pedro II (1825–1891): Fastígio (1870–1880) (in Portuguese). Vol. 2. Belo Horizonte: Itatiaia.
- Lira, Heitor (1977). História de Dom Pedro II (1825–1891): Declínio (1880–1891) (in Portuguese). Vol. 3. Belo Horizonte: Itatiaia.
- Martins, Luís (2008). O patriarca e o bacharel (in Portuguese) (2nd ed.). São Paulo: Alameda. ISBN 978-85-98325-68-2.
- Mônaco Janotti, Maria de Lourdes (1986). Os Subversivos da República (in Portuguese). São Paulo: Brasiliense.
- Olivieri, Antonio Carlos (1999). Dom Pedro II, Imperador do Brasil (in Portuguese). São Paulo: Callis. ISBN 978-85-86797-19-4.
- Rodrigues, José Carlos (1863). Constituição política do Império do Brasil (in Portuguese). Rio de Janeiro: Typographia Universal de Laemmert.
- Salles, Ricardo (1996). Nostalgia Imperial (in Portuguese). Rio de Janeiro: Topbooks. OCLC 36598004.
- Sauer, Arthur (1889). Almanak Administrativo, Mercantil e Industrial (in Portuguese). Rio de Janeiro: Laemmert & C. OCLC 36598004.
- Schwarcz, Lilia Moritz (1998). As barbas do Imperador: D. Pedro II, um monarca nos trópicos (in Portuguese) (2nd ed.). São Paulo: Companhia das Letras. ISBN 978-85-7164-837-1.
- Vainfas, Ronaldo (2002). Dicionário do Brasil Imperial (in Portuguese). Rio de Janeiro: Objetiva. ISBN 978-85-7302-441-8.
- Vasquez, Pedro Karp (2003). O Brasil na fotografia oitocentista (in Portuguese). São Paulo: Metalivros. ISBN 978-85-85371-49-4.
- Viana, Hélio (1994). História do Brasil: período colonial, monarquia e república (in Portuguese) (15th ed.). São Paulo: Melhoramentos. ISBN 978-85-06-01999-3.

Pedro II of Brazil House of Braganza Cadet branch of the House of Aviz Born: 2 December 1825 Died: 5 December 1891
Regnal titles
Preceded by Pedro I	Emperor of Brazil; 7 April 1831 – 15 November 1889	Monarchy abolished Republic established under President Deodoro da Fonseca
Brazilian royalty
Preceded by Princess Maria; Later Queen Maria II of Portugal	Prince Imperial of Brazil; 2 December 1825 – 7 April 1831	Succeeded by Maria II of Portugal
Titles in pretence
Republic declared	— TITULAR — Emperor of Brazil; 15 November 1889 – 5 December 1891	Succeeded by Princess Isabel
