= Order of Saint James of the Sword (Brazil) =

Former honorific order of the Empire of Brazil

Imperial Order of Saint James of the Sword
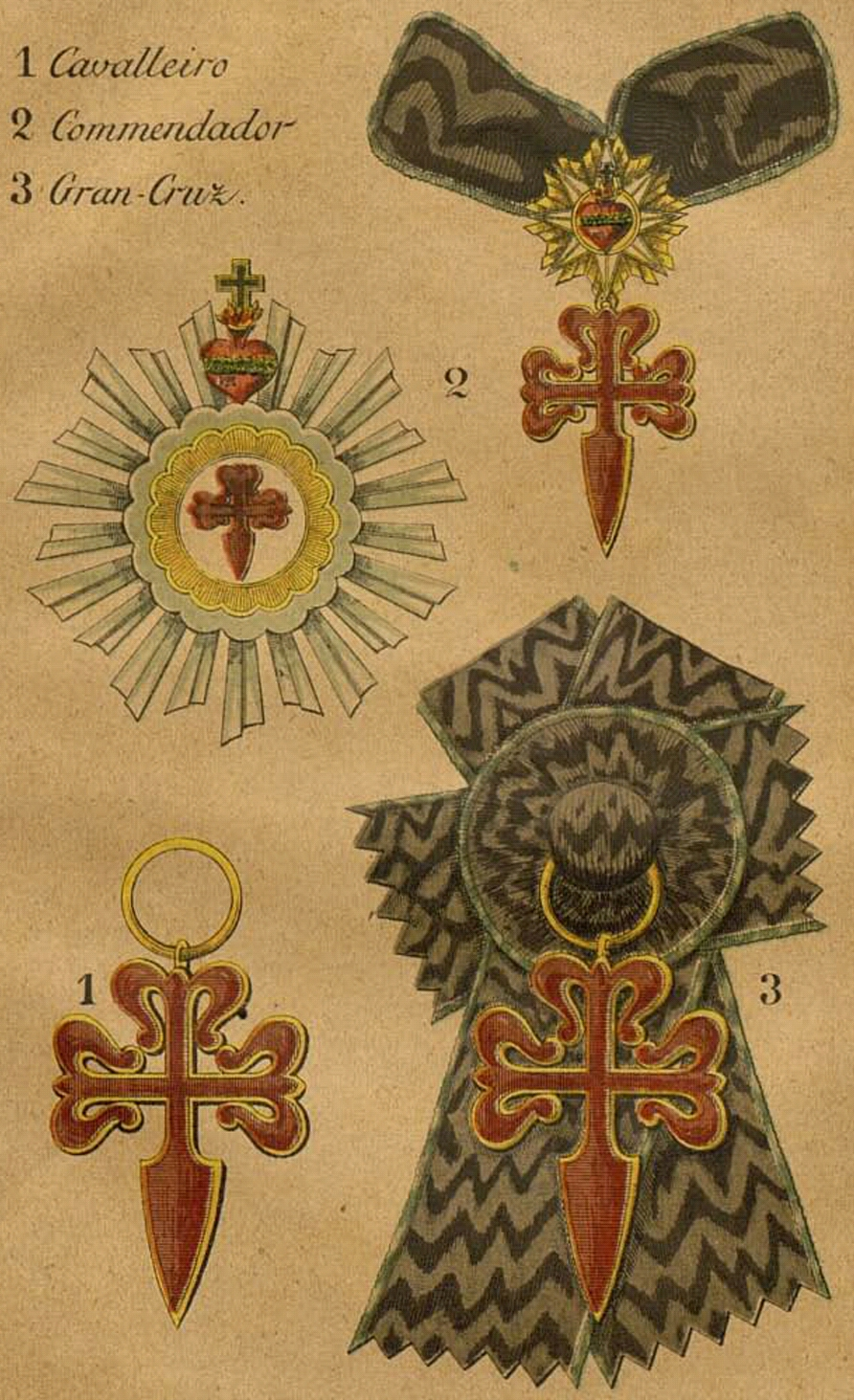
- Imperial Order of the Saint James of the Sword, Grand Dignitary

Awarded by the Head of the Brazilian Imperial Family
- Type: Dynastic order
- Established: 9 September 1843 (as a Brazilian Order); 1843 – 1890 (National Order); 1890 – present (House Order)
- Royal house: House of Orleans-Braganza
- Status: Abolished as a state order
- Grand Master: Disputed: Prince Bertrand of Orléans-Braganza; Prince Pedro Carlos of Orléans-Braganza
- Grades: Grand Cross (Grã-cruz); Commander (Comendador); Knight (Cavaleiro)

Precedence
- Next (higher): Imperial Order of Aviz
- Next (lower): Imperial Order of the Cross
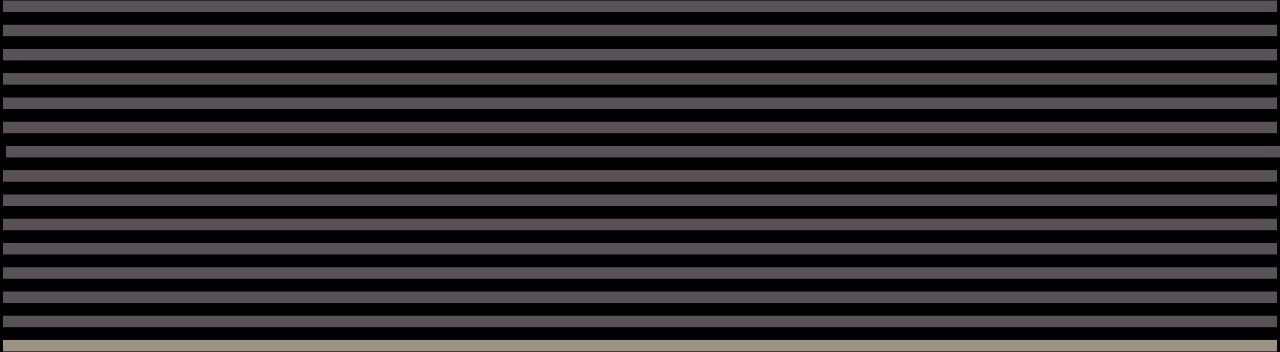
- Ribbon bar of the order

The Imperial Order of St. James of the Sword (Portuguese: Imperial Ordem de São Tiago da Espada) was an honorific order of the Empire of Brazil, originating from the Portuguese Order of Saint James of the Sword. "Nationalized" by Dom Pedro I of Brazil, this order has followed the reform proposed by Dona Maria II of Portugal, which had recommended to the judiciary. The Portuguese order was offered to those who made advancements in literature, science and art, while the Brazilian order was almost exclusively for military personnel, both by Pedro I and his son Dom Pedro II. The order was awarded under the Order of Pedro I.

The order was stripped to its religious characteristics by a decree on September 9, 1843.

On 22 March 1890, the order was cancelled as national order by the interim government of United States of Brazil. Since the deposition in 1889 of the last Brazilian monarch, Emperor Pedro II, the order continues as a house order being awarded by the Heads of the House of Orleans-Braganza, pretenders to the defunct throne of Brazil. The current Brazilian Imperial Family is split into two branches Petrópolis and Vassouras, and as a consequence the Grand Mastership of the Order is disputed between those two branches.

- The historical ribbon of the Order was violet with small light blue stripes at each edge.
- The modern ribbon of the Order is violet.

The Order of Saint James of the Sword was issued in three grades:

- Grand Cross, who wore the badge on a sash on the right shoulder, plus the star on the left side of the chest;
- Commander, who wore the badge on a necklet, plus the star on the left side of the chest;
- Knight, who wore the badge on a ribbon on the left side of the chest.

== See also ==
- Order of Aviz (Brazil)
- Order of the Southern Cross
- Order of the Rose
- Order of Pedro I
- Order of Christ (Brazil)
