= Order of Aviz (Brazil) =

Imperial Order of St. Benedict of Avis
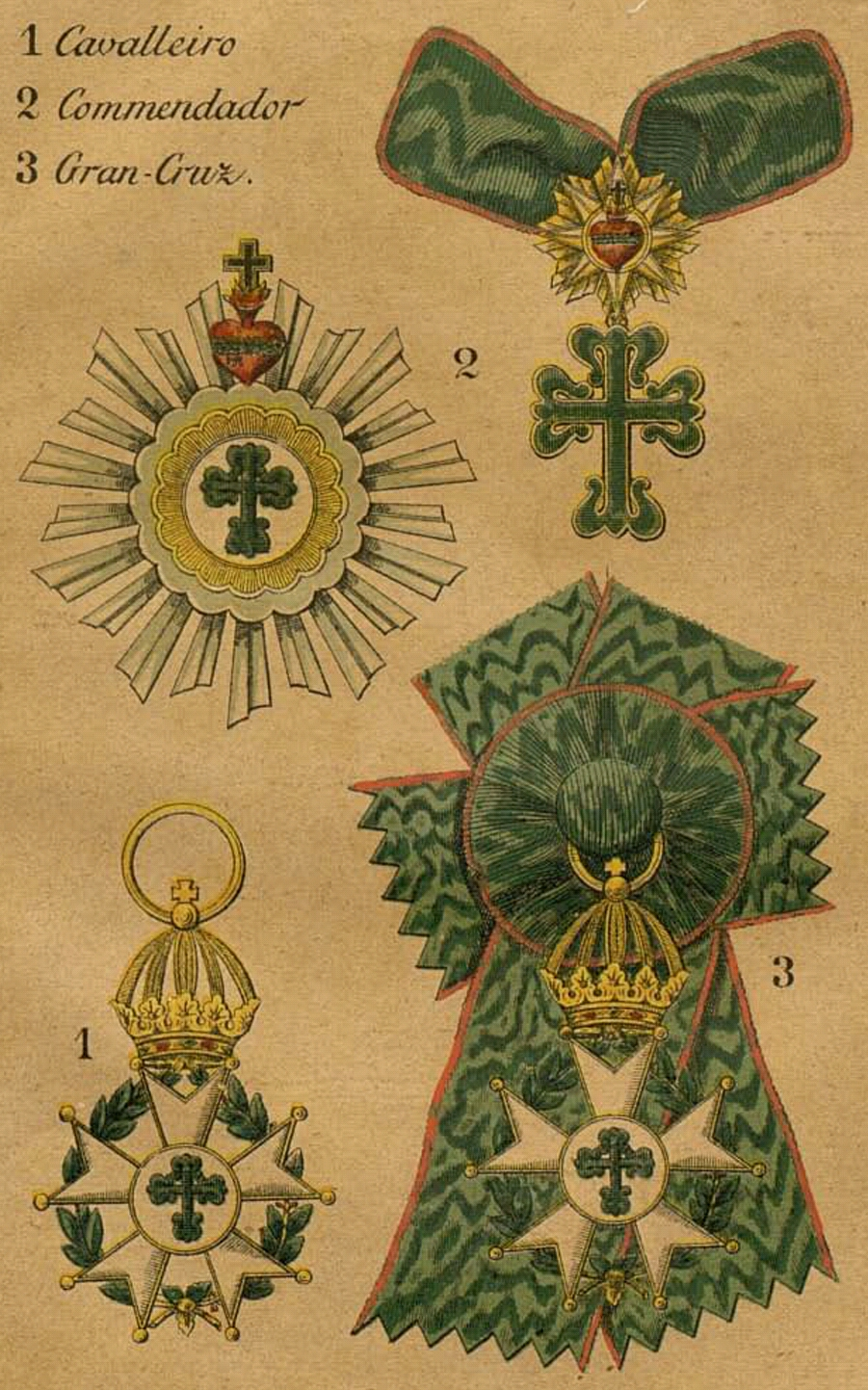
- Order of Aviz

Awarded by the Head of the Brazilian Imperial Family
- Type: Dynastic Order
- Established: 9 September 1843 (as a Brazilian Order); 1843 – 1891 (National Order); 1891 – present (House Order)
- Grand Master: Disputed: Prince Bertrand of Orléans-Braganza; Prince Pedro Carlos of Orléans-Braganza
- Grades: Grand Cross; Commander; Knight

Precedence
- Next (higher): Imperial Order of Christ
- Next (lower): Imperial Order of Saint James of the Sword
- Ribbon bar of the Order

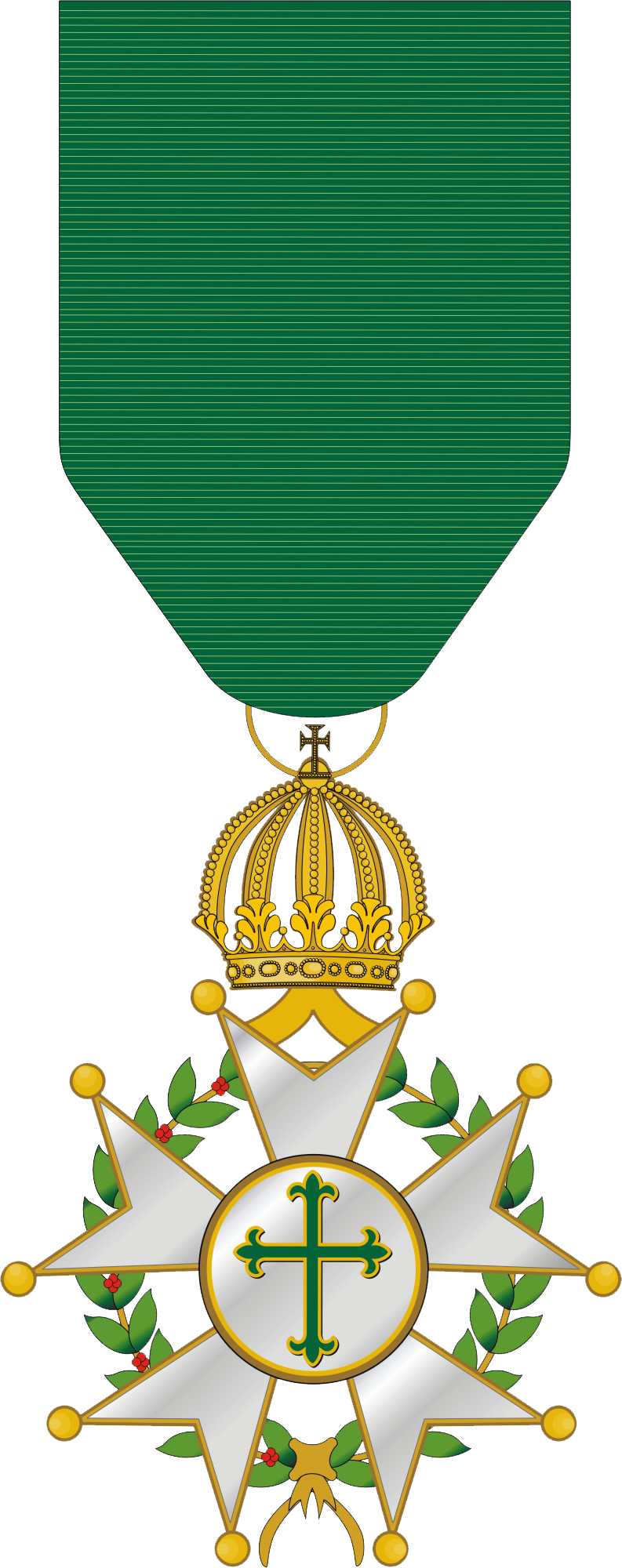
Condecoration of the Imperial Order of Aviz; Knight degree

The Imperial Order of St. Benedict of Avis (Portuguese: Imperial Ordem de São Bento de Avis) is an old Brazilian military order, originated from the Portuguese Military Order of Aviz, which in turn dates back to the medieval Order of Saint Benedict of Avis. This medieval order apparently originated in Spain from the Order of Calatrava; another theory reports that it originated in Portugal in the twelfth century under King Afonso Henriques.

The chancellery that took care of the records of the Brazilian order belonged to the Ministry of the Empire. Its religious character was deprived by means of Decree of 9 September 1843. It was maintained after the proclamation of the Republic, together with the Imperial Order of the Southern Cross, by determination of Marshal Deodoro da Fonseca, by decree no. 227F of 22 of March 1890. Until its definitive extinction, by means of Constitution of 1891, arrived from the Fonseca to distribute the orders of Avis and the Cruise to 724 people.

By decree no. 4238 of 15 November 1901, an honorary medal was created that bears his name, reserved to decorate Brazilian soldiers of the three arms. Also, the Order of Military Merit, created by Decree No. 24660 of June 11, 1934, presents the cross flowering in reference to the Imperial Order of Avis.

Although, since the deposition in 1889 of the last Brazilian monarch, Emperor Pedro II, the order continues as a house order being awarded by the Heads of the House of Orleans-Braganza, pretenders to the defunct throne of Brazil. The current Brazilian Imperial Family is split into two branches Petrópolis and Vassouras, and as a consequence the Grand Mastership of the Order is disputed between those two branches.

== History ==
The Imperial Order of St. Benedict of Avis was founded by Emperor Pedro I of Brazil upon the independence of the country in 1822. It was regularized only in 1842 by Emperor Pedro II. Unlike the other orders that were abolished by the Provisional Government of the Republic, the Order of St. Benedict of Avis and the Order of the Southern Cross were initially preserved from extinction but were kept restricted to military personnel only, under the Decree of the Provisional Government number 227-F of 22 March 1890.

However, all remaining Orders of Knighthood, including the Order of St. Benedict of Avis, and even the newly created Order of Columbus (that had been created by the Provisional Government of the Republic on 6 June 1890), with exception of the Order of the Southern Cross, were declared abolished upon the adoption of the new Republic's first Constitution, on 24 February 1891 (due to a clause in the Constitution that extinguished all titles of nobility and orders of knighthood).

However, this constitutional provision was interpreted as prohibiting the granting of new titles and the awarding of new knighthoods, and as abolishing the Orders themselves (as organized entities), but not as prohibiting the use of titles and honours receiving in the past, and therefore people who had been granted noble titles or positions in the Orders of Knighthood before their extinction were allowed the said titles and the insignia of the Order. Accordingly, the Order of St. Benedict of Aviz only effectively died out once all those who had been admitted to it prior to 1981 had died.

In spite of the abolition of the Order, Decree No. 4328 of 15 November 1901 created a military medal named after the extinct Order: the Medal of the Military Order of Avis.

== Characteristics ==
=== Insignia ===
Great cross

- Obverse: white star with five forked tips and doorknobs, seated on garland of coffee and tobacco branches, pendant of imperial crown. To the center, white round medallion with florid cross, of green, embroidered of gold.

Tape and band

- Historical: Green in color with two small red (or rose) borders.
- Modern: Green in color

=== Degrees ===
- Grand Cross (Grã-Cruz)
- Commander (Comendador)
- Knight (Cavaleiro)

== Recipients ==
Some notable recipients include:

- (Empire of Brazil) Luís Alves de Lima e Silva, Duke of Caxias
- (Empire of Brazil) Felipe Joaquim da Cunha e Castro
- (Empire of Brazil) Giacomo Raja Gabaglia
- (France) Émile Mallet, Baron of Itapevi
- (Empire of Brazil) Carlos Frederico Lecor, Viscount of Laguna.
- (France) Augusto Leverger, Baron of Melgaço
- (Empire of Brazil) Joaquim Xavier Curado, Count of São João das Duas Barras

== See also ==
- Portuguese Order of Aviz
- Imperial Order of Saint James of the Sword
- Order of the Southern Cross
- Order of the Rose
- Order of Pedro I
- Imperial Order of Christ
- Dynastic Order
