= João Maria of Orléans-Braganza =

João Maria of Orléans-Bragança
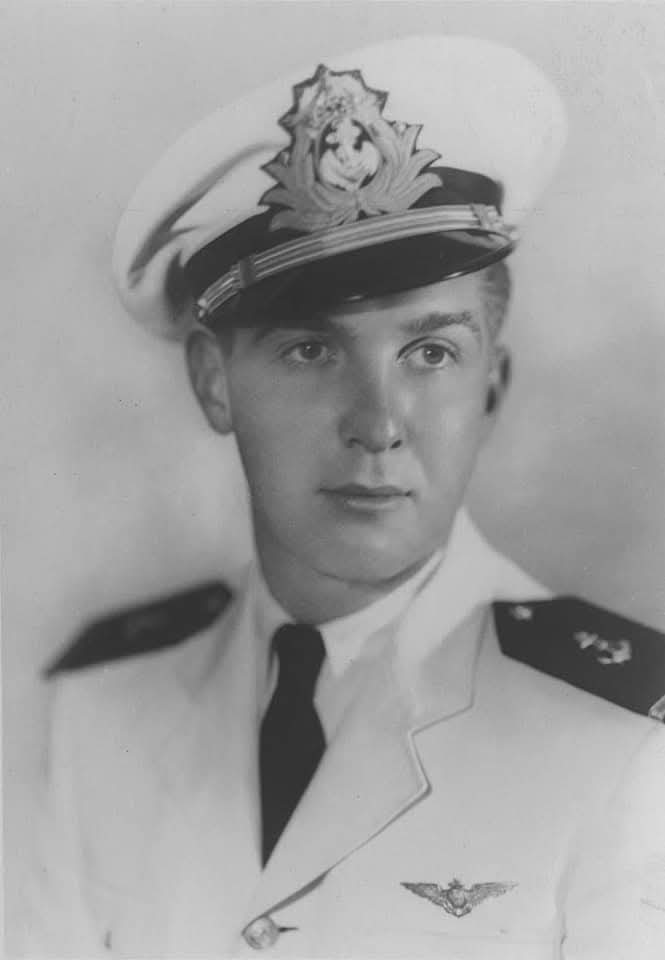
- Born: 15 October 1916; Boulogne-Billancourt, France
- Died: 26 June 2005 (aged 88); Rio de Janeiro, Brazil
- Spouse: Fatima Sherifa Chirine (m. 1949; div. 1971) Tereza de Souza Campos (m. 1990)
- Issue: João Henrique of Orléans-Braganza
Names
- João Maria Felipe Miguel Gabriel Rafael Gonzaga de Orléans e Bragança e Dobrzensky de Dobrzenicz
- House: Orléans-Bragança
- Father: Pedro de Alcântara, Prince of Grão-Pará
- Mother: Countess Elisabeth Dobrzensky of Dobrzenicz
- Religion: Roman Catholic

João Maria of Orléans-Bragança (15 October 1916 – 26 June 2005) was a French-born Brazilian soldier, pilot and airline executive. He was also a member of the Brazilian Imperial Family.

== Early life ==
João was born in Boulogne-Billancourt, France to Pedro de Alcântara, Prince of Grão-Pará and Countess Elisabeth Dobrzensky of Dobrzenicz. His father, eldest son of the elder daughter of Pedro II of Brazil, had been expected to eventually inherit the throne of Brazil until the Imperial Family was exiled upon abolition of the monarchy in 1889.

He lived with his parents and paternal grandparents at the Chateau d'Eu in Normandy, a property inherited from his paternal ancestors, the House of Orléans, who ruled France until 1848. João first travelled to Brazil in 1925, aged 9, and emigrated to the country, living in the Grão-Pará Palace in Petrópolis.

As a young man he was a member of Ação Integralista Brasileira (AIB), a fascist group led by writer Plínio Salgado. In 1938 he was injured in the Integralist Uprising, an attempt to storm the Guanabara Palace, residence of President Getúlio Vargas.

== Marriage and family ==
In 1946 João was stationed in Cairo as a member of the Brazilian air force when he was invited by King Farouk of Egypt to attend a reception, at which he met an Egyptian aristocrat, née Fátima Scherifa Chirine (born 19 April 1923 in Cairo and died 14 March 1990 in Rio de Janeiro), daughter of Ismail Hussein Chirine Bey and Aysha Musallam. Married since 1940, she had become the widow that year of the king's cousin, Prince Hassan Omar Toussoun of Egypt (1901-1946), killed in an auto accident in France, and was a first cousin of Colonel Ismail Chirine, second husband of Queen Fawzia of Iran. The couple soon fell in love, but they expected to encounter much opposition to a marriage between a Christian prince and a Muslim princess. Although the couple's engagement was accepted by João's elder brother, Prince Pedro Gastão, as head of the House of Orléans-Braganza, and by his brother-in-law Henri, Count of Paris, who was head of the French branch of the dynasty, the fiancée's family withheld approval, as she was the mother of young Princess Melekper of Egypt by her first husband. On 29 April 1949 in Sintra, Portugal the couple finally married, at the home of the Count and Countess of Paris and in the presence of João's mother.

The couple's only child, the future photo-journalist, royalist and agricultural environmentalist Prince João d'Orléans-Bragance, was born in Rio de Janeiro on 25 April 1954, where they took up residence, imposing a substantial lifestyle change on Fatima, who had been accustomed to a luxurious and cosmopolitan existence at the court of Cairo. She was initially deprived of custody of her daughter, but after years of negotiations the princess joined her mother's family in Rio de Janeiro. Joazinho's descent from Louis XIII was confirmed by DNA in 2013.

João's first marriage ended by divorce in 1971, and was later annulled. He was married again, in 1990, to Tereza de Souza Campos (born 11 January 1929 in Ubá, died 26 June 2020). Fatima, who had converted to Roman Catholicism in 1958, was remarried in Rio de Janeiro to Eduardo Bahout (died 1980).

== War and work ==
João returned to Brazil with the intent of doing military service, did not pass an admission test to join the Brazilian navy, but began a career in naval aviation with the aid of Admiral Castro e Silva, and inspired by his uncle, Prince António of Orléans-Braganza (1881-1918). The latter had been an army lieutenant in the Austrian Hussars when World War I began, but to avoid fighting against France he had become a pilot in the British Royal Navy, and died in an air crash near London at the end of the war. Prince João joined the Brazilian Air Force in 1941, during World War II, which sent him for training as a pilot to the United States, where he attended the academies at West Point (and met Antoine de Saint-Exupéry), Annapolis and Pensacola, graduating as a second lieutenant.

The prince served in the first Brazilian fighter planes, the North American T-6, which were subsequently used to execute Brazil's famous aerial acrobatic exercises, "La Fumaça" (Smoke). His great passion was piloting hydroplanes, especially the Catalina flying boats which patrolled Brazil's coasts. After the war they were redeployed for the postal service, in which, having graduated as a second lieutenant, he took up employment. João also worked as a commercial pilot. At that time, Brazilian airlines, like Panair, lacked the resources to compete, so the government detailed air force pilots to supplement their international service. That was how, in 1946, João found himself in Egypt, setting up the first regular Rio-to-Cairo air route, at which time he met his future wife.

After the War, he became vice president of Pan-Air do Brasil.

== Later life and legacy ==
João retired to Paraty on the west coast of the state of Rio de Janeiro. When he settled there in the 1960s, it was a 400 year-old town, surrounded by forest in a national park, wedged on the bay of Ilha Grande between Rio de Janeiro and São Paulo. It lacked even an access road, and its isolation between two giant cities preserved its culture, history and pristine nature. He built a fazenda there of 500 hectares, which remains the family seat and a domain integral to the Paraty community. He died in 2005 at the age of 88 in Rio de Janeiro.

In October 2018, João's son Prince Dom Joaozinho, grandson Dom João Filipe de Orléans e Bragança, and great-grandson João António attended the grand opening of the "Aeroporto Municipal Principe D. João de Orleans e Bragança" in Paraty, the family having donated much of the land for the hangars and runway.

== Ancestors ==
Ancestors of João Maria of Orléans-Braganza

8. Prince Louis, Duke of Nemours
4. Prince Gaston, Count of Eu
9. Princess Victoria of Saxe-Coburg and Gotha
2. Pedro de Alcântara, Prince of Grão-Pará
10. Pedro II of Brazil
5. Isabel, Princess Imperial of Brazil
11. Princess Teresa Cristina of the Two Sicilies
1. Prince João Maria de Orléans e Bragança
12. Baron Johann Nepomuk Dobrženský von Dobrženitz
6. Count Johann Wenzel Dobrženský von Dobrženitz
13. Baroness Marie Friederike Wanczura von Rzehnicz
3. Countess Elisabeth Dobrženský von Dobrženitz
14. Count Josef Kottulinsky von Kottulin und Krzizkowitz
7. Countess Elisabeth Kottulinsky von Kottulin und Krzizkowitz
15. Countess Adelheid von Attems-Heiligenkreuz
