= Thereza de Orleans e Bragança =

Brazilian socialite (1929–2020)

- Born: Thereza de Jesus Cezar Leite; 27 January 1929; Ubá, Minas Gerais, Brazil
- Died: June 27, 2020 (aged 91); Rio de Janeiro, Brazil
- Occupation: socialite

Thereza de Jesus Cezar Leite Souza Campos e Orleans e Bragança (January 17, 1929 – June 27, 2020), formerly known as Thereza de Souza Campos and later as Thereza de Orleans e Bragança, was a Brazilian socialite. She was married to Prince João Maria of Orléans-Braganza for more than twenty years.

== Biography ==
Thereza was born in Ubá, a city located in interior of Minas Gerais. Daughter of a merchant father, leave to Petrópolis, at Rio de Janeiro interior, for study a traditional colegial in the city. Further, leave from Petrópolis for Rio de Janeiro, then federal capital of the country. In Rio, he became one of the main names of Rio's high society, being present in several bars, nightclubs and restaurants frequented by the Rio elite. According to the writer and journalist, Ruy Castro, she was one of the main characters of Rio's nightlife, being admired by the women who frequented those environments. Along with names like Lourdes Catão, Dolores Guinle and Therezinha Muniz Freire, they were among the main names in bohemian life in the 1940s and 1950s.

At the age of seventeen, she married Carlos Eduardo de Souza Campos, popularly known as Didu. A Banco do Brasil (BB) executive and polo player, Didu supplemented his income from the economic reserves left by his father, Vilobaldo de Sousa Campos, former director of the state bank. The couple had only one son, Diduzinho Souza Campos, who later became one of the main nightlife playboys in Rio in the 1970s. The couple lived in a twenty-room house built by Vilobaldo located in Copacabana and received personalities such as Aly Khan and Rita Hayworth.

Her influence on Rio's nightlife was such that Thereza was featured on the cover of Manchete magazine - the main national magazine in her context - on two occasions. In 1956, she was chosen by the magazine's jury as the best dressed woman of the previous year. In 1968, she returned to the cover of the magazine, stamping the first edition of the magazine of the year.

In 1990, she married for the second time, this time with João Maria de Orléans e Bragança, member of the royal family of Brazil and grandson of Princess Isabel. The civil wedding was held in Petrópolis, on April 29, 1990, and, 16 days later, in Rio de Janeiro, the religious wedding took place.

She became the widow of João Maria in 2005, the victim of a stroke.

== Death ==
Thereza died in 2020, at the age of 91, in the city of Rio de Janeiro. She went through the last year of her life, very depressed by the death of her only son, Diduzinho, who died in 2019.
