= Prince of Grão-Pará =

Brazilian noble title

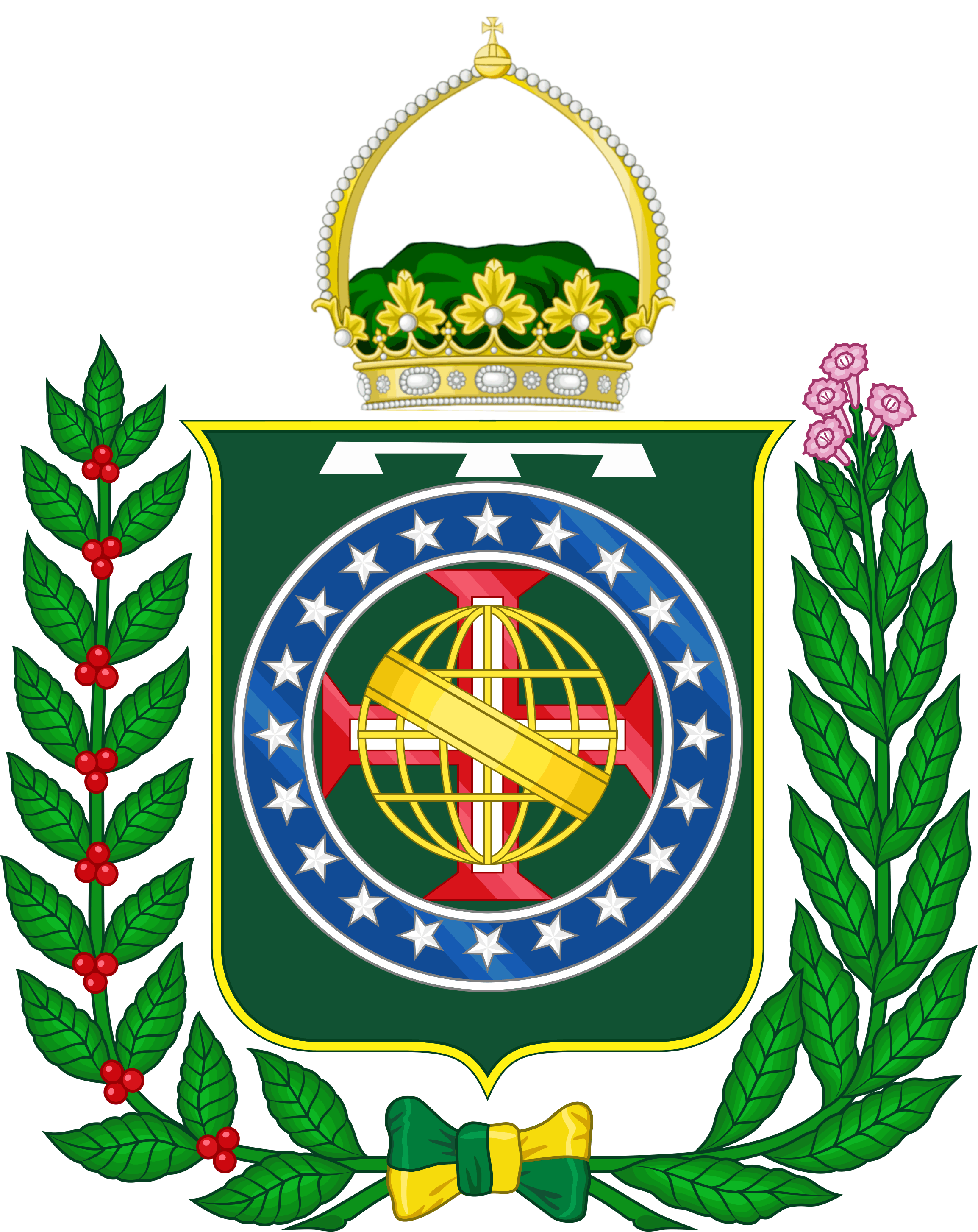
Coat of Arms of the Prince of Grão-Pará

The Prince of Grão-Pará was the title bestowed on the eldest son of the Prince Imperial of Brazil. It was inspired and was analogous to the title of Prince of Beira, bestowed on the eldest son of the Prince Royal of Portugal. The title holder was the second in the line of succession to the throne of the Empire of Brazil, after the Prince Imperial. The title was established by article 105 of the 1824 Brazilian Constitution, which read:

O Herdeiro presumptivo do Imperio terá o Titulo de "Principe Imperial" e o seu Primogenito o de "Principe do Grão Pará" todos os mais terão o de "Principes". O tratamento do Herdeiro presumptivo será o de "Alteza Imperial" e o mesmo será o do Principe do Grão Pará: os outros Principes terão o Tratamento de Alteza.
(The heir presumptive of the Empire will have the title of "Prince Imperial" and his first born son the title of "Prince of Grão-Pará", all the others shall have that of "Prince". The style of the heir presumptive and the Prince of Grão-Pará will be "Imperial Highness": the other princes will have the style of "Highness".)

The only holder of the title under the constitution was Prince Pedro de Alcântara of Orléans-Braganza, who was the eldest son of Isabel, Princess Imperial of Brazil, and grandson of Emperor Pedro II. He held the title from his birth in 1875 until after the Brazilian monarchy was abolished in 1889.

The only known documented and official exception was Princess Maria da Glória, who was created Princess of Grão-Pará in her own right by her father, Emperor Pedro I, after the birth of his heir apparent, Prince Imperial Pedro (later Pedro II). She used the title in her capacity as second in the line of succession to the Brazilian throne from December 1825 to April 1826, until her father abdicated the Portuguese throne in her favor, and she became Queen Maria II of Portugal.

However, after the fall of the Brazilian monarchy, the family maintained the use of their titles of right. In 1909 Prince Pedro Henrique of Orléans-Braganza was born, son of Prince Luís, styled Prince Imperial of Brazil, and therefore was titled Prince of Grão-Pará until the death of his father in 1920, becoming Prince Imperial.

== List of princes of Grão-Pará ==
Image	Name	Lifespan	Tenure	Parents
	Princess Maria da Glória (Maria II of Portugal)	4 April 1819 — 15 November 1853	2 December 1825 — 2 May 1826	Pedro I of Brazil; Maria Leopoldina of Austria
	Prince Pedro de Alcântara	15 October 1875 — 29 January 1940	15 October 1875 — 5 December 1891	Isabel, Princess Imperial of Brazil; Prince Gaston of Orléans, Count of Eu

== See also ==
- Prince of Brazil (Brazil)
- Prince Imperial of Brazil
- Brazilian imperial family
- House of Orléans-Braganza
