= Augusto Stahl =

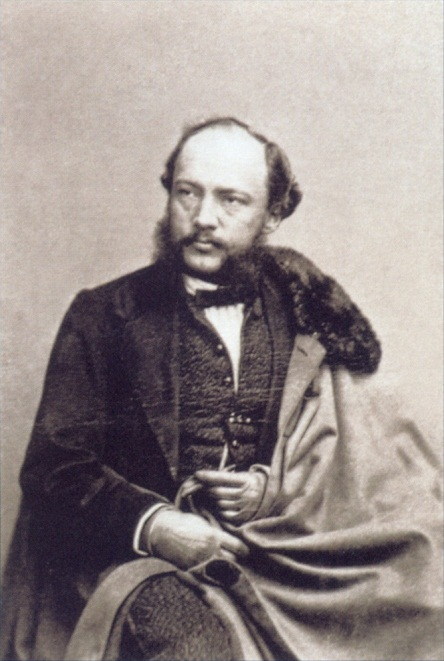
Auguste Stahl, c.1863

Theóphile Auguste Stahl (Bergamo, May 23, 1828 – Brumath, Alsace, October 30, 1877) or simply Augusto Stahl, as he was known in Brazil, was a French photographer who lived during the 19th century. Born in Bergamo, in Italy, son of a Lutheran priest, Stahl disembarked in Recife on December 31, 1853, on board the ship Thames, of the Royal Mail. He operated in Pernambuco until 1861, moving to Rio de Janeiro and receiving from the emperor D. Pedro II the title of Photographo da Casa Imperial (Photographer of the Imperial House), on April 21, 1862. A landscape photographer, Stahl demonstrated an interest in tropical nature. He also documented the construction of the second Brazilian railway and Emperor Pedro II's visit to Recife, in 1858. He participated in various photographic expositions in the 1860s. Stahl is also known for portraying the everyday life of enslaved Black people.

Augusto Stahl Photographic Collection

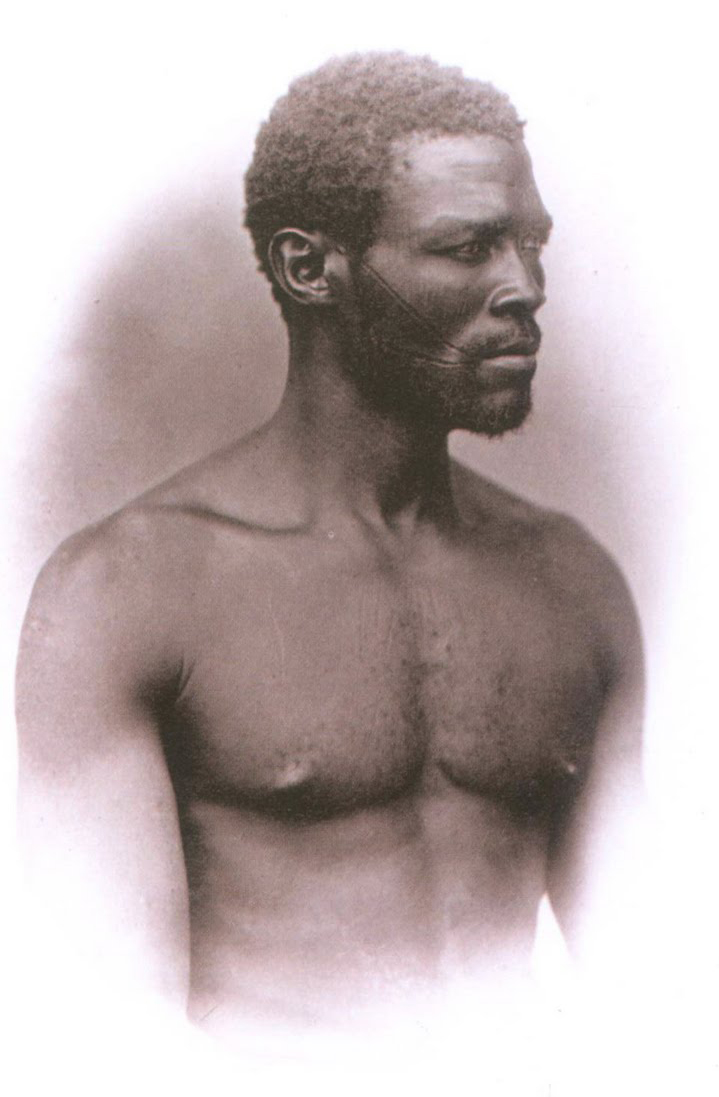
Slave in Brazil, 1865

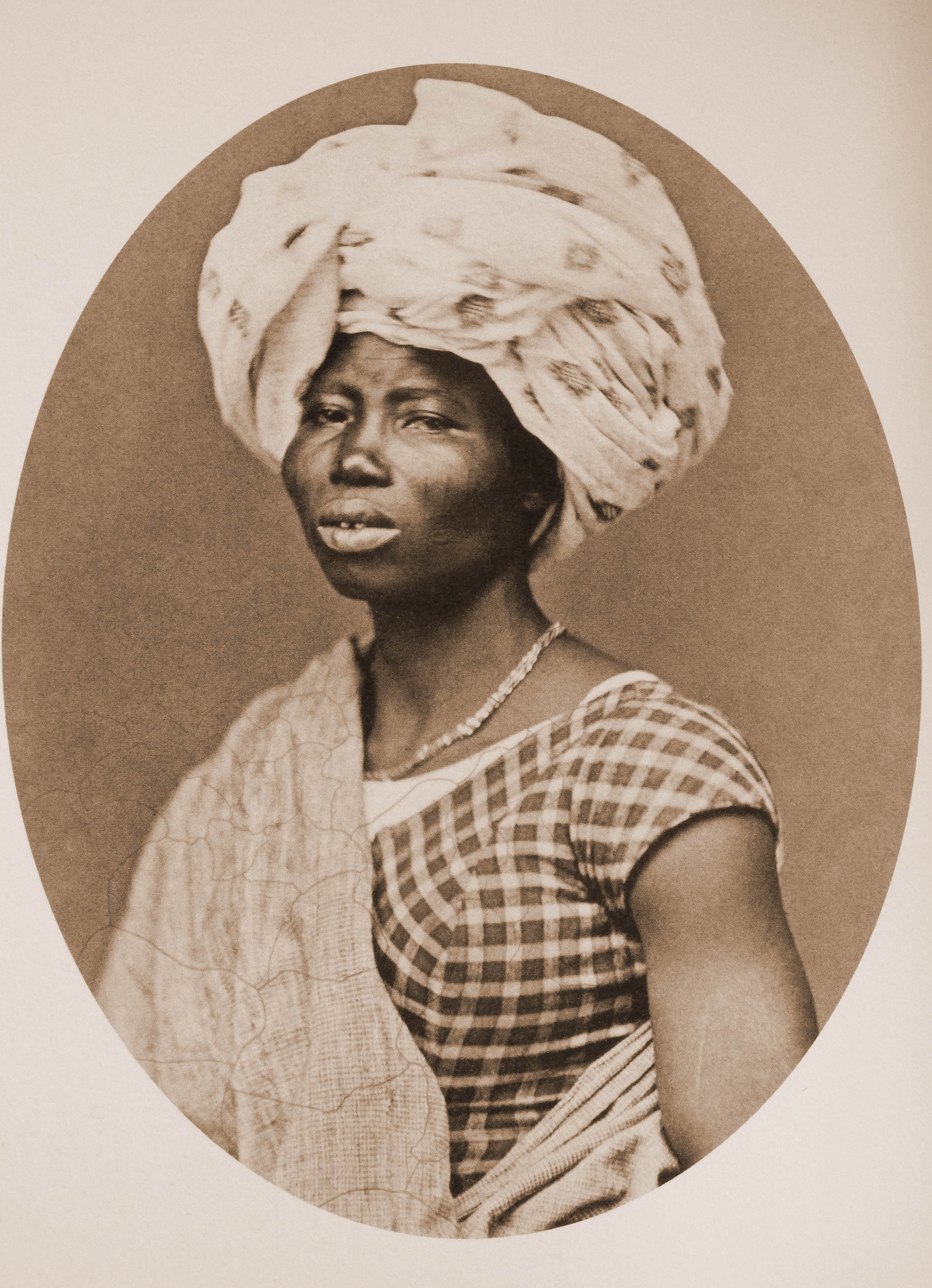
Racial type portrait, identified as Mina Igeichà, Rio de Janeiro, 1865

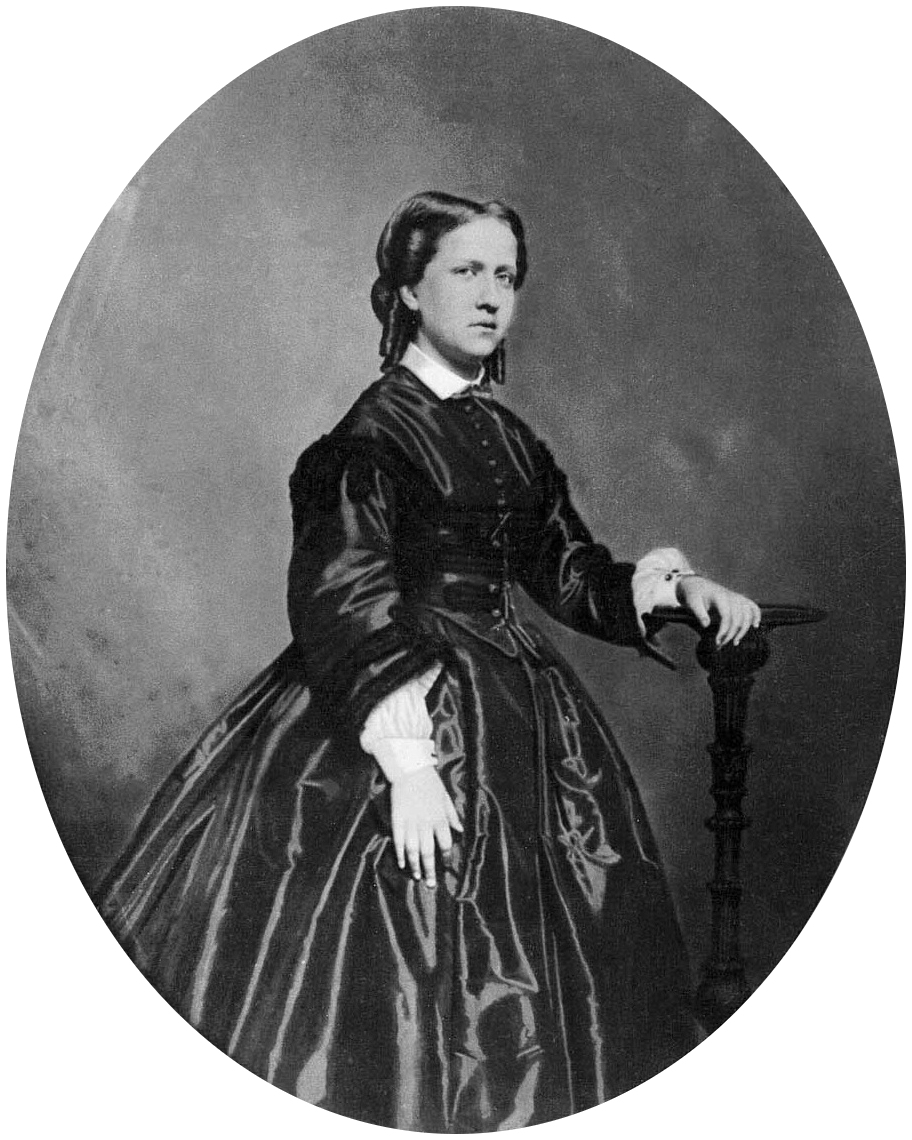
Isabel, Princess Imperial of Brazil, 19, c. 1865
