= Palácio do Grão-Pará =

Palace in Petrópolis, Brazil

Palace of the Grand Pará
- Palácio do Grão-Pará
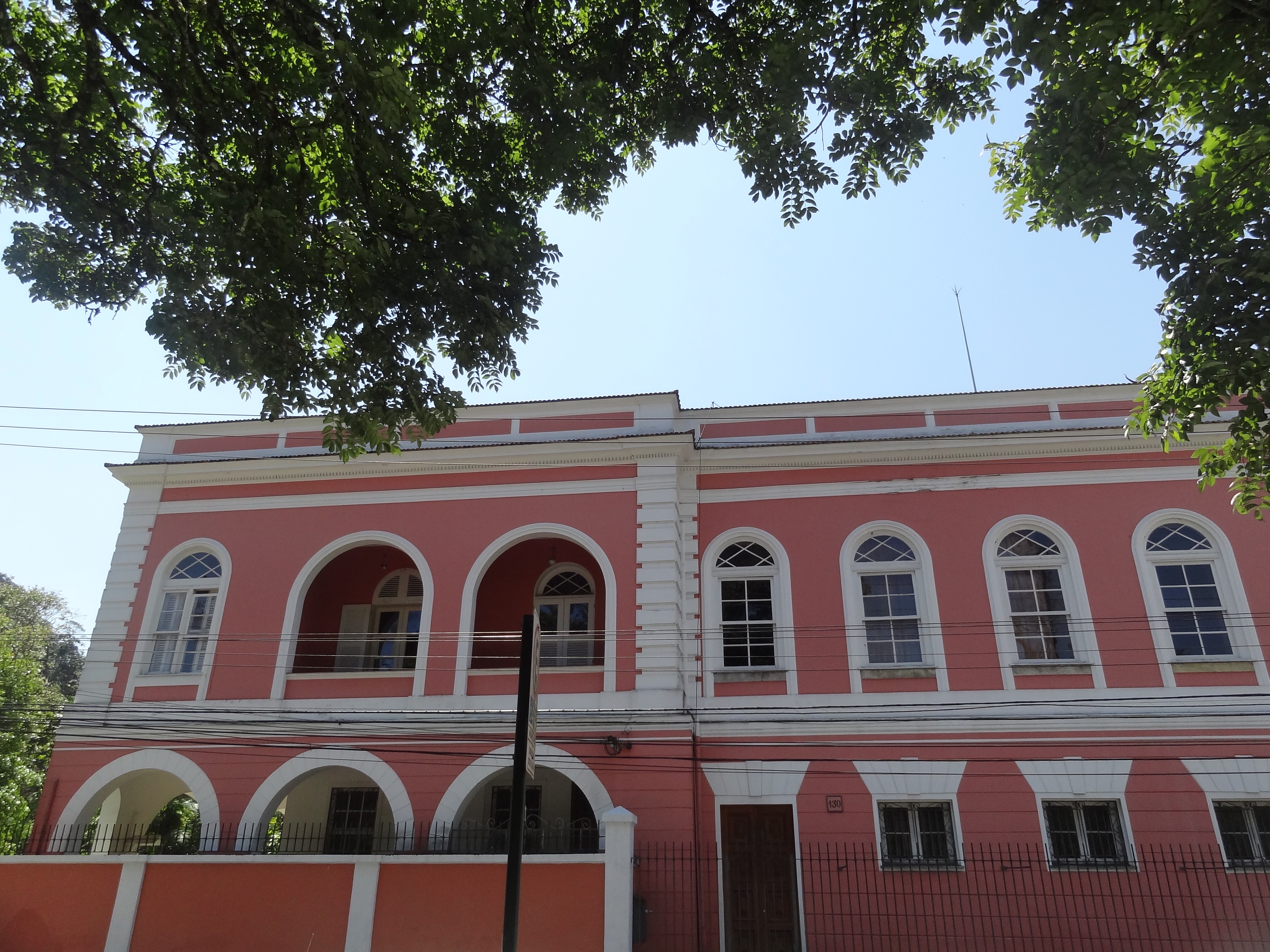
- Interactive map of the Palace of the Grand Pará area

General information
- Architectural style: Neoclassical
- Location: Petrópolis, Rio de Janeiro, Brazil
- Coordinates: 22°30′28″S 43°10′26″W
- Construction started: 1859
- Completed: 1861
- Owner: Prince Pedro of Orléans-Braganza
- Affiliation: House of Orléans-Braganza

Design and construction
- Architect: Theodore Marx

The Palace of the Grand Pará (Portuguese: Palácio do Grão-Pará) is a royal palace located in the city of Petrópolis, in the state of Rio de Janeiro, Brazil. It is currently the only palace still belonging to the Brazilian Imperial Family, being the only royal palace in the Americas occupied by a royal family.

== History ==
=== Imperial period ===
Originally built as a guesthouse for the seminarians and priests to the Imperial Court, it became a residence of the Imperial Family. It is located behind the former summer Imperial Palace of Pedro II of Brazil (1840–1889).

The palace was designed by the architect of the Emperor Theodore Marx, with the contribution of de Araújo Porto Alegre. The building has a neoclassical architectural style. Its construction began in 1859 and was completed in 1861.

During the Empire (1822–1889), the palace was intended for the accommodation of councilors and members of representative families, who took turns at the service of Emperor Pedro II of Brazil and his family.

It housed the Court of Justice during the Old Republic. Subsequent to that period, it became, in sequence, the College of Luso-Brazilian (the United Kingdom of Portugal, Brazil and the Algarves) and the residence of former U.S. ambassador to Brazil Edwin V. Morgan (1865–1934), who served as ambassador from 1912 to 1933.

=== Republican period ===
With the repeal of the ban on Brazilian imperial family in 1921, ownership of the Palace of the Grand Para passed back to the Imperial family, and was used as the residence of the eldest son of Isabel, Princess Imperial of Brazil, who in turn was the daughter of Emperor Pedro II of Brazil. Isabel's eldest son, Pedro de Alcântara, Prince of Grão Para, renounced his position as heir in order to contract a marriage to a non-royal; the Palace then passed to his next brother Prince Luiz of Orléans-Braganza in his capacity as Isabel's recognised heir. After his death, the Palace became the residence of the eldest son of Pedro de Alcântara, Prince of Grão Para, D. Prince Pedro Gastão of Orléans-Braganza.

Since 27 December 2007, it has been the residence of Prince Pedro Carlos of Orléans-Braganza, eldest son of Prince Pedro Gastão of Orléans-Braganza; his second son was born in the palace, and his second wife died in residence.

It was registered in 1959 by the Brazilian National Historical and Artistical Heritage Institute.
