= Countess Elizabeth Dobrženský von Dobrženitz =

Bohemian noblewoman (1875–1951)

Elizabeth Dobrženský von Dobrženitz
- Princess Pedro de Alcântara of Orléans-Braganza
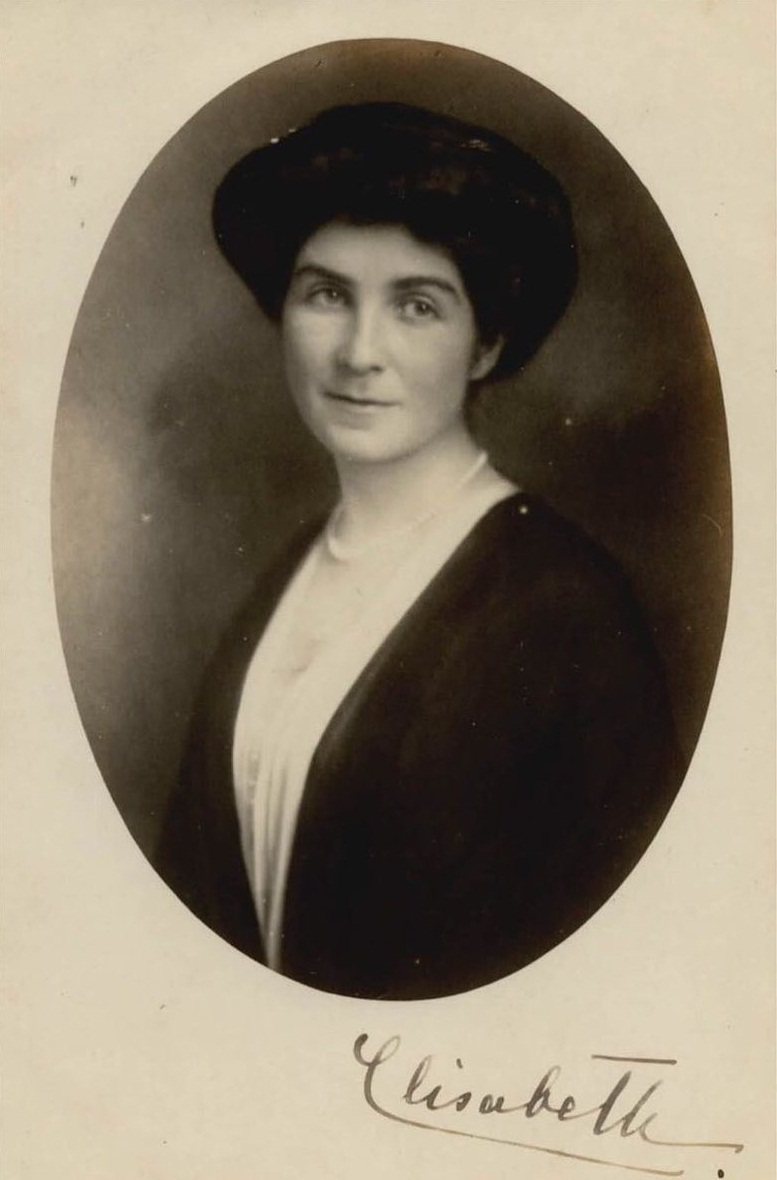
- Photo of Elisabeth Dobrzensky of Dobrzenicz
- Born: Alžběta Maria Adelheid Dobřenská z Dobřenic; 7 December 1875; Chotěboř, Bohemia, Austria-Hungary
- Died: 11 July 1951 (aged 75); Sintra, Portugal
- Buried: Cathedral of Saint Peter of Alcantara, Petrópolis, Brazil
- Noble family: Dobrženský von Dobrženitz
- Spouse: Pedro de Alcântara, Prince of Grão-Pará (m. 1908; died 1940)
- Issue: Princess Isabelle, Countess of Paris; Prince Pedro Gastão; Princess Maria Francisca, Duchess of Braganza; Prince João Maria; Princess Teresa
- Father: Count Johann Wenzel Dobrženský von Dobrženicz
- Mother: Countess Elisabeth Kottulinsky von Kottulin und Krzizkowitz

Elisabeth Maria Adelheid Dobrženský von Dobrženitz (also Dobrzensky de Dobrzenicz; Czech: Alžběta Maria Adelheid Dobřenská z Dobřenic; 7 December 1875 – 11 June 1951) was a Bohemian noblewoman whose marriage to the son of the former heiress to the throne of Brazil prompted renunciation of his claim to the abolished monarchy's throne.

== Early life ==
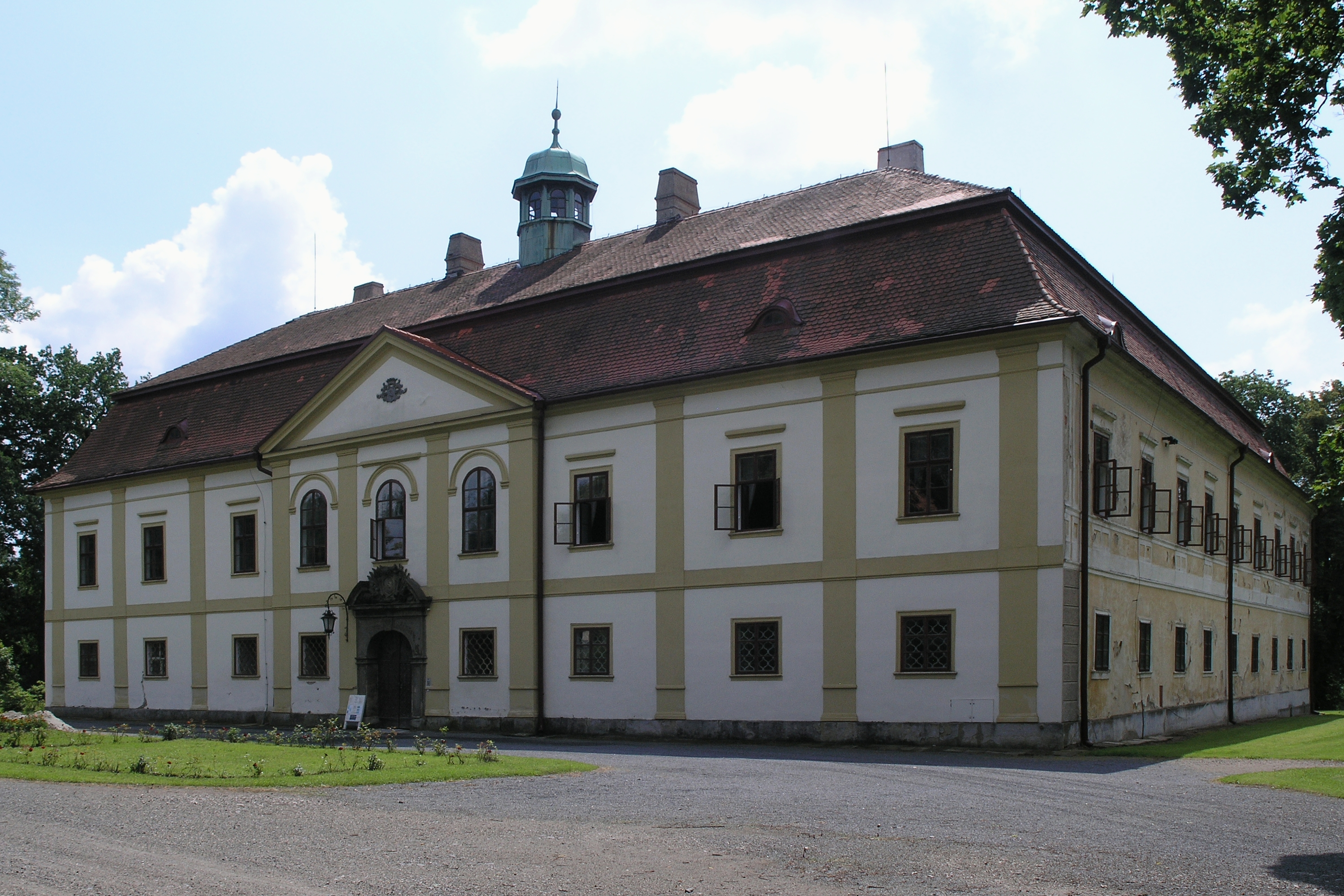
Chotěboř castle, country estate of the Dobrženský family, members of an old Bohemian nobility

Born in the Chotěboř castle, family estate of an old Bohemian noble family, Elisabeth Maria Adelheid was the fourth child and only daughter of Johann Wenzel, Count Dobrženský of Dobrženicz (1841–1919) and his wife, Countess Elisabeth Kottulinsky, Baroness of Kottulin and Krzizkowitz (1850–1929).

She had three elder brothers Jan, Otokar and Jaroslav and a younger brother named Karl Kunata. Karl Kunata renamed himself to Count Kottulinský, like his maternal family, in Austria in 1905; late in 1912, he married Countess Maria Theresia von Meran (1893-1981), member of a morganatic branch of the House of Habsburg-Lorraine.

== Marriage and issue ==
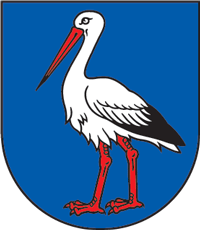
Coat of arms of the Dobrženský family

Elisabeth married Pedro de Alcântara, Prince of Grão-Pará on 14 November 1908 at Versailles. He had previously renounced his hereditary claim to the crown of Brazil because she was not of royal birth. They had five children:

- Princess Isabelle of Orléans-Braganza (1911–2003) married Henri, Count of Paris (parents of Henri, Orléanist pretender to the throne of France).
- Prince Pedro Gastão of Orléans-Braganza (1913–2007) married Princess Maria de la Esperanza of Bourbon-Two Sicilies (parents of Princess Maria da Glória, Duchess of Segorbe, former Crown Princess of Yugoslavia).
- Princess Maria Francisca of Orléans-Braganza (1914–1968) married Duarte Nuno, Duke of Braganza (parents of Duarte Pio, Duke of Braganza, the current pretender to the throne of Portugal).
- Prince João Maria of Orléans-Braganza (1916–2005) married Fatima Sherifa Chirine (1923-1990), widow of Prince Hassan Toussoun, Prince of Egypt.
- Princess Teresa Teodora of Orléans-Braganza (1919–2011) married Ernesto António Maria Martorell y Calderó (1921-1985); Before her marriage, she was the fiancée of Prince Carlos of Bourbon-Two Sicilies.

== Death ==
Elisabeth died on 11 June 1951, in Sintra, Portugal, aged 75. She was buried alongside her husband, Pedro de Alcântara in the Cathedral of Petrópolis.

== Honors ==
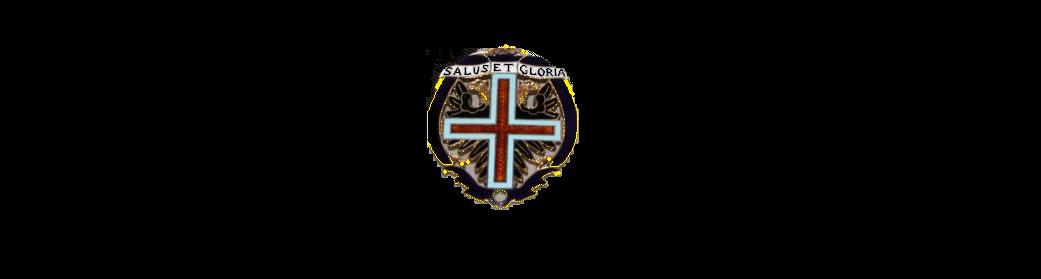
- Austria-Hungary : Dame of the Order of the Starry Cross.

== Ancestry ==
Ancestors of Countess Elizabeth Dobrženský von Dobrženitz

8. Baron Johann Wenzel Dobrženský von Dobrženicz
4. Baron Johann Nepomuk Dobrženský von Dobrženicz
9. Baroness Maria Anna Pergler von Perglas
2. Count Johann Wenzel Dobrženský von Dobrženicz
10. Baron Josef Joachim Wanczura von Rzenicz
5. Baroness Marie Friederike Wanczura von Rzenicz
11. Baroness Friederike Lamotte von Frintropp
1. Countess Elisabeth Dobrženský von Dobrženicz
12. Count Josef Johann Kottulinsky von Kottulin und Krzizkowitz
6. Count Josef Kottulinsky von Kottulin und Krzizkowitz
13. Countess Maria Josefa Katzianer zu Katzenstein
3. Countess Elisabeth Kottulinsky von Kottulin und Krzizkowitz
14. Count Franz Anton von Attems-Heiligenkreuz
7. Countess Adelheid von Attems-Heiligenkreuz
15. Countess Ernestine Khuen von Belasi
