= Panair =

Italian air taxi operator

Panair - Compagnia Aerea Mediterranea
IATA	ICAO	Call sign
P2	PIT	Panairfly
- Founded: 1979
- Ceased operations: 2003
- Fleet size: 3

Panair International was an air taxi operator, founded in 1979 and based in Palermo. Starting from 1987 it operated Cessna Citation executive twin jetliners. In 2001, given the undeniable attractiveness of Sicily, the management decided to enter the charter sector itself and changed corporate name to Panair - Compagnia Aerea Mediterranea. A Boeing 737-300 was leased from summer, flanked by a Boeing 737-400 in the following month of December. In March 2003, both were withdrawn from use marking the end of Panair's flight operations.

== Fleet ==
Aircraft	Image	Total	Introduced	Retired	Remark
Boeing 737-300		1	2001	2003	EI-PAR
Boeing 737-400		1	2001	2003	EI-PAM
Cessna Citation II		1	1992	2009	I-FLYD
