= Isabel, Princess Imperial of Brazil =

Heir to the Brazilian throne (1846–1921)

Isabel
- Princess Imperial of Brazil; Countess of Eu
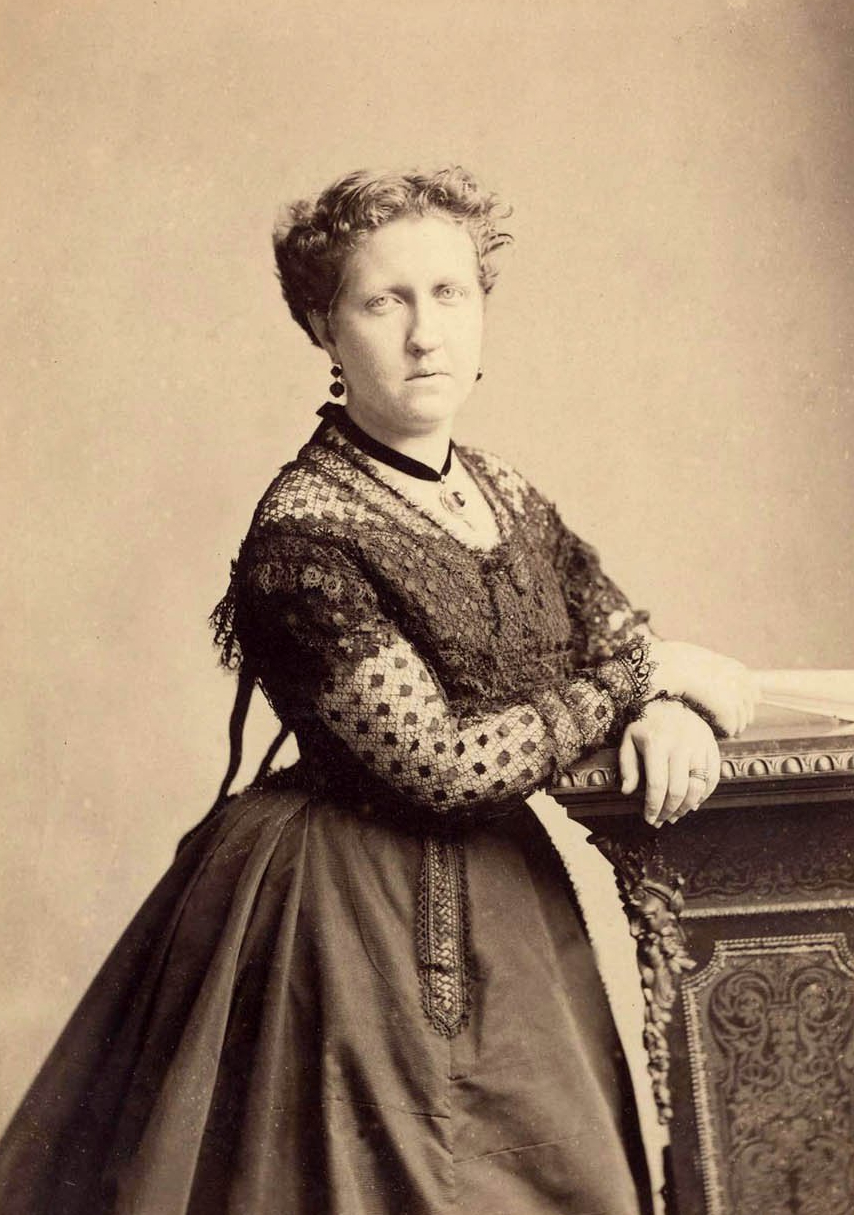
- Photo by Joaquim Insley Pacheco, c. 1870

Head of the Imperial House of Brazil
- Tenure: 5 December 1891 – 14 November 1921
- Predecessor: Emperor Pedro II
- Successor: Disputed: Pedro de Alcântara(Petrópolis); Pedro Henrique (Vassouras)
- Born: 29 July 1846; Palace of São Cristóvão, Rio de Janeiro, Empire of Brazil
- Died: 14 November 1921 (aged 75); Château d'Eu, Eu, France
- Burial: Cathedral of Saint Peter of Alcantara, Petrópolis, Brazil
- Spouse: Prince Gaston, Count of Eu (m. 1864)
- Issue: Pedro de Alcântara, Prince of Grão-Pará; Prince Luís; Prince Antônio
Names
- Portuguese: Isabel Cristina Leopoldina Augusta Miguela Gabriela Rafaela Gonzaga
- House: Braganza
- Father: Pedro II of Brazil
- Mother: Teresa Cristina of the Two Sicilies
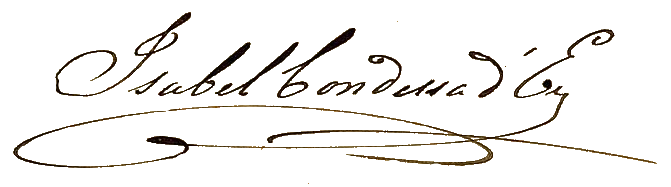
- Signature

Dona Isabel (Note: Princess Isabel's name is almost always rendered in its Portuguese version by English-speaking historians; however, her name has been translated into English—albeit rarely—as both Elizabeth (Monk 1971, p. 22) and Isabella (Edwards 2008, p. 267).) (29 July 1846 – 14 November 1921), known as "the Redemptress" (A Redentora), was the Princess Imperial of Brazil and heir presumptive to the throne of the Empire of Brazil. She served as regent of the empire on three occasions and was a central figure in Brazilian history during the final decades of the monarchy.

Born in Rio de Janeiro, Isabel was the eldest daughter of Emperor Pedro II and Empress Teresa Cristina, and a member of the Brazilian branch of the House of Braganza (Portuguese: Bragança). Following the deaths of her two younger brothers in infancy, she was formally recognized as her father's heir presumptive. In 1864, she entered into an arranged marriage with the French prince Gaston, Count of Eu, with whom she had three sons.

During Emperor Pedro II's absences abroad, Isabel exercised the powers of the crown as regent. In her third and final regency, she sponsored and signed the Lei Áurea ("Golden Law") in 1888, which abolished slavery in Brazil. Although emancipation was widely celebrated by the population, it intensified opposition among influential landowners and political elites. Her prospective accession was further contested due to prevailing gender prejudices, her strong Catholic faith, and her marriage to a foreign prince.

In 1889, the Brazilian imperial family was overthrown in the military coup that ended the monarchy. Isabel subsequently lived in exile in France, where she spent the final three decades of her life.

== Early life ==
=== Birth ===
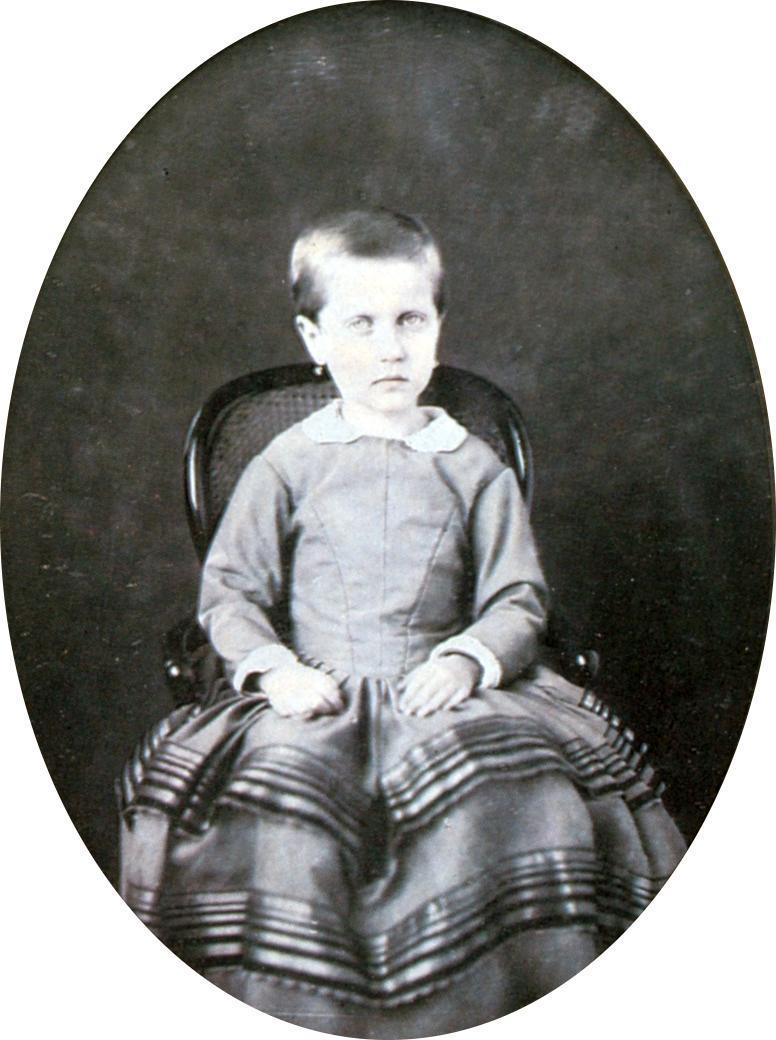
Isabel around age 5, c. 1851. This is likely the first photograph ever taken of the princess.

Isabel was born at 6:30 p.m. on 29 July 1846 in Rio de Janeiro's Paço de São Cristóvão (Palace of Saint Christopher). She was the daughter of Brazil's Emperor Pedro II and his wife Teresa Cristina. On 15 November the infant princess was baptized in an elaborate ceremony in Igreja da Glória (Church of Glory). Her godparents, both represented by proxy, were her uncle, King Ferdinand II of Portugal, and her maternal grandmother María Isabella of Spain. She was christened Isabel Cristina Leopoldina Augusta Miguela Gabriela Rafaela Gonzaga. Her last four names were always bestowed upon the members of her family, and Isabel and Cristina honored Isabel's maternal grandmother and mother, respectively.

She was a member of the Brazilian branch of the House of Braganza through her father, and from birth was referred to using the honorific Dona (English: Dame or Lady). She was the granddaughter of Brazil's Emperor Pedro I (who also briefly reigned as Portugal's King Pedro IV), and the niece of Queen Maria II of Portugal (wife of Ferdinand II). Through her mother, she was a granddaughter of Francis I and niece to Ferdinand II, both kings of the Two Sicilies in turn. (Note: Francis I and Ferdinand II were Teresa Cristina's father and brother (Calmon 1975, p. 210).)

At the time of her birth, she had an elder brother named Afonso who was heir apparent to the Brazilian throne. Two other siblings followed: Leopoldina in 1847 and Pedro in 1848. Afonso's death in 1847, at the age of 2 1/2, propelled Isabel to the position of Pedro II's heir presumptive. She briefly lost the position with the birth of Prince Imperial Pedro. After his death in 1850, Isabel became the definitive heir presumptive as Princess Imperial, the title given to the first in the line of succession. Isabel's early years were a time of peace and prosperity in Brazil. Her parents provided a happy and healthy upbringing. She and her sister "grew up in a stable, secure environment dramatically different from the one her father and aunts had known, and light years away from the childhood chaos of Pedro I."

=== Heir to the throne ===
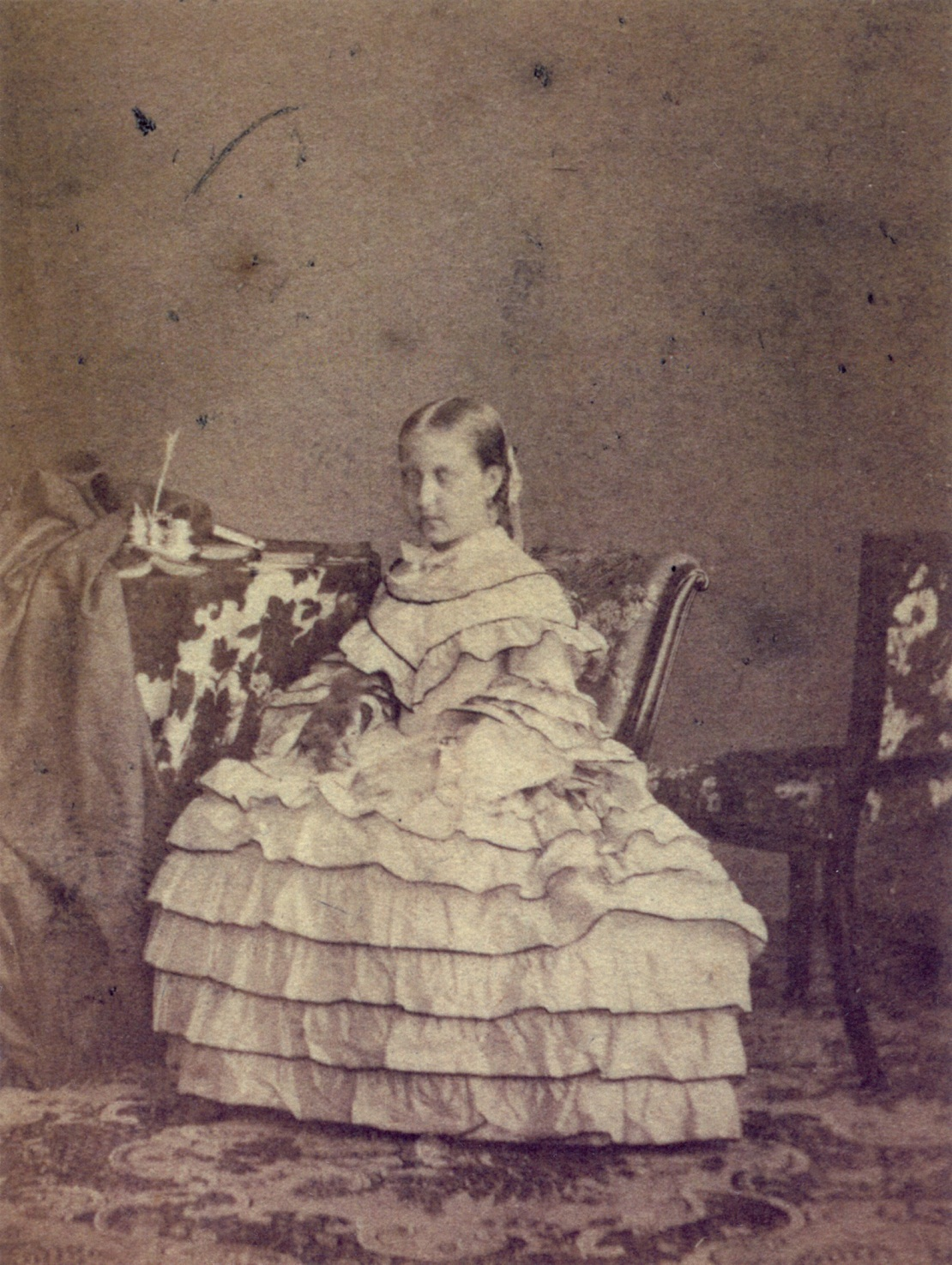
Isabel at age 12, 1858

The early death of both of his sons had an enormous impact on Pedro II. Aside from his personal grief, the loss of his sons affected his future conduct as monarch and would determine the fate of the Empire. In the Emperor's eyes, the deaths of his children seemed to portend an eventual end of the Imperial system. The future of the monarchy as an institution no longer concerned him, as he increasingly saw his position as being nothing more than that of Head of State for his lifetime.

The Emperor's words revealed his inner conviction. After learning of the death of his son Pedro in 1850, he wrote: "This has been the most fatal blow that I could receive, and certainly I would not have survived were it not that I still have a wife and two children whom I must educate so that they can assure the happiness of the country in which they were born." Seven years later, in 1857, when it was more than clear that no more children would be born, the Emperor wrote: "As to their education, I will only say that the character of both the princesses ought to be shaped as suits Ladies who, it may be, will have to direct the constitutional government of an Empire such as Brazil".

Although the Emperor still had a legal successor in his beloved daughter Isabel, the male-dominated society of the time left him little hope that a woman could rule Brazil. He was fond and respectful of the women in his life, but he did not consider it feasible that Isabel could survive as monarch, given the political realities and climate. To historian Roderick J. Barman, the Emperor "could not conceive of women, his daughters included, playing any part in governance. [...] In consequence, although he valued D. Isabel as his daughter, he simply could not accept or perceive her in cold reality as his successor or regard her as a viable ruler." The main reason for this behavior was his attitude toward the female gender. "Pedro II believed, as did most men of his day", says Barman, "that a single woman could not manage life's problem on her own, even if she possessed the powers and authority of an empress."

== Upbringing ==
=== Education ===
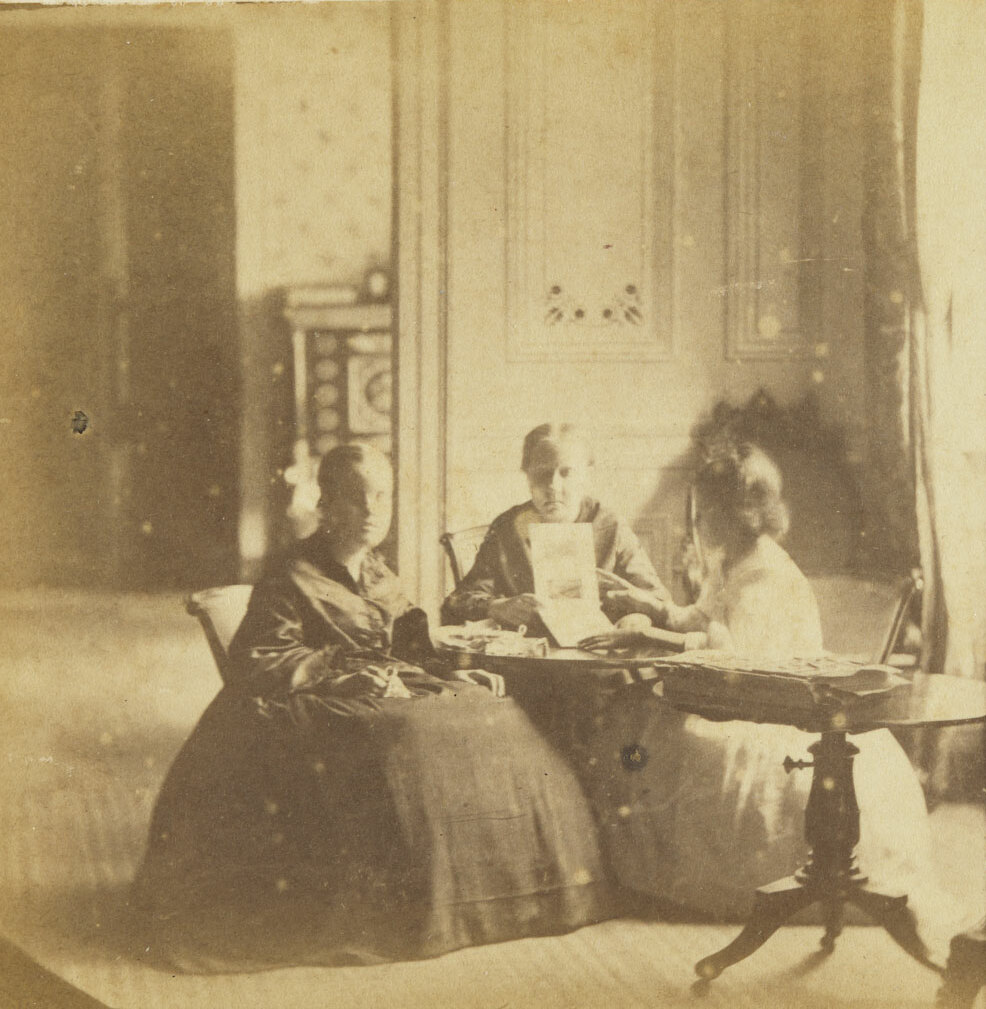
Princesses Leopoldina (left) and Isabel (center) with an unidentified friend, c. 1860

Isabel began her education on 1 May 1854, when she was taught how to read and write by a male instructor, who was openly republican. As the Portuguese (and later Brazilian) court tradition demanded, the heir of the throne was supposed to have an aio (supervisor, tutor or governess) in charge of his education once he achieved the age of seven. After a long search, Pedro II chose the Brazilian-born Luísa Margarida Portugal de Barros, the Countess of Barral, daughter of a Brazilian noble and wife of a French noble. Barral assumed her position on 9 September 1856, when Isabel was ten years old. The 40-year-old Countess was a charming and vivacious woman who soon captured the heart of Isabel and became a kind of role model to the young princess.

In Pedro II's own words, his daughters' education "should not differ from that given to men, combined with that suited the other sex, but in a manner that does not distract from the first." He "provided his daughters with a broad, democratic and rigorous education, through both its curriculum and the teachers who taught it." For over nine and a half hours per day and six days per week, Isabel and her sister were in class. Subjects were broad and included Portuguese and French literature, astronomy, chemistry, the history of Portugal, England and France, drawing, piano, dancing, political economy, geography, geology, and the history of philosophy. As an adult, beyond her native Portuguese, Isabel became fluent in French, English and German.

Among her teachers were Barral, others who had taught her father as a child, and even Pedro II, who gave lessons in Latin, geometry, and astronomy. The education provided to Isabel was lacking, however. All she assimilated were abstract ideas which did not teach her "how to integrate" them "with practical application". Her tutors and parents did not prepare her to rule Brazil, nor to understand its political and social issues. A way of preparing her for a role as future empress "would have been to give her from an early age personal experience of the tasks she would face and to relate it to what she learned in the classroom." That did not happen. Pedro II "showed her no state papers. He did not discuss politics with her. He did not take her with him on his constant visits to government offices. He did not include her in the despacho, the weekly meetings with the cabinet members, nor did he allow her to attend the public audiences that took place twice a week." She might have been officially heir presumptive to the throne, "but by his treatment of her Pedro II deprived the honor of any meaning."

=== Domestic life ===
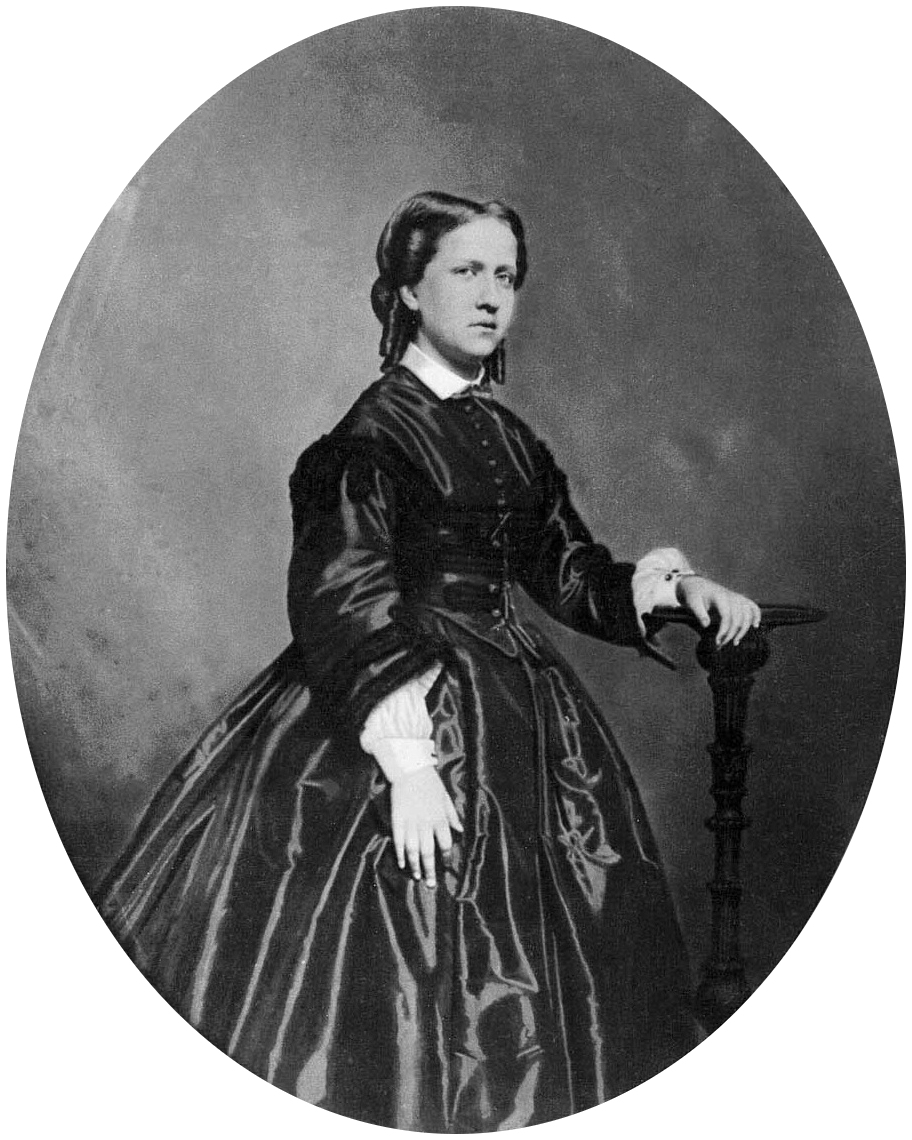
Isabel around age 19, c. 1865 (photograph by Augusto Stahl)

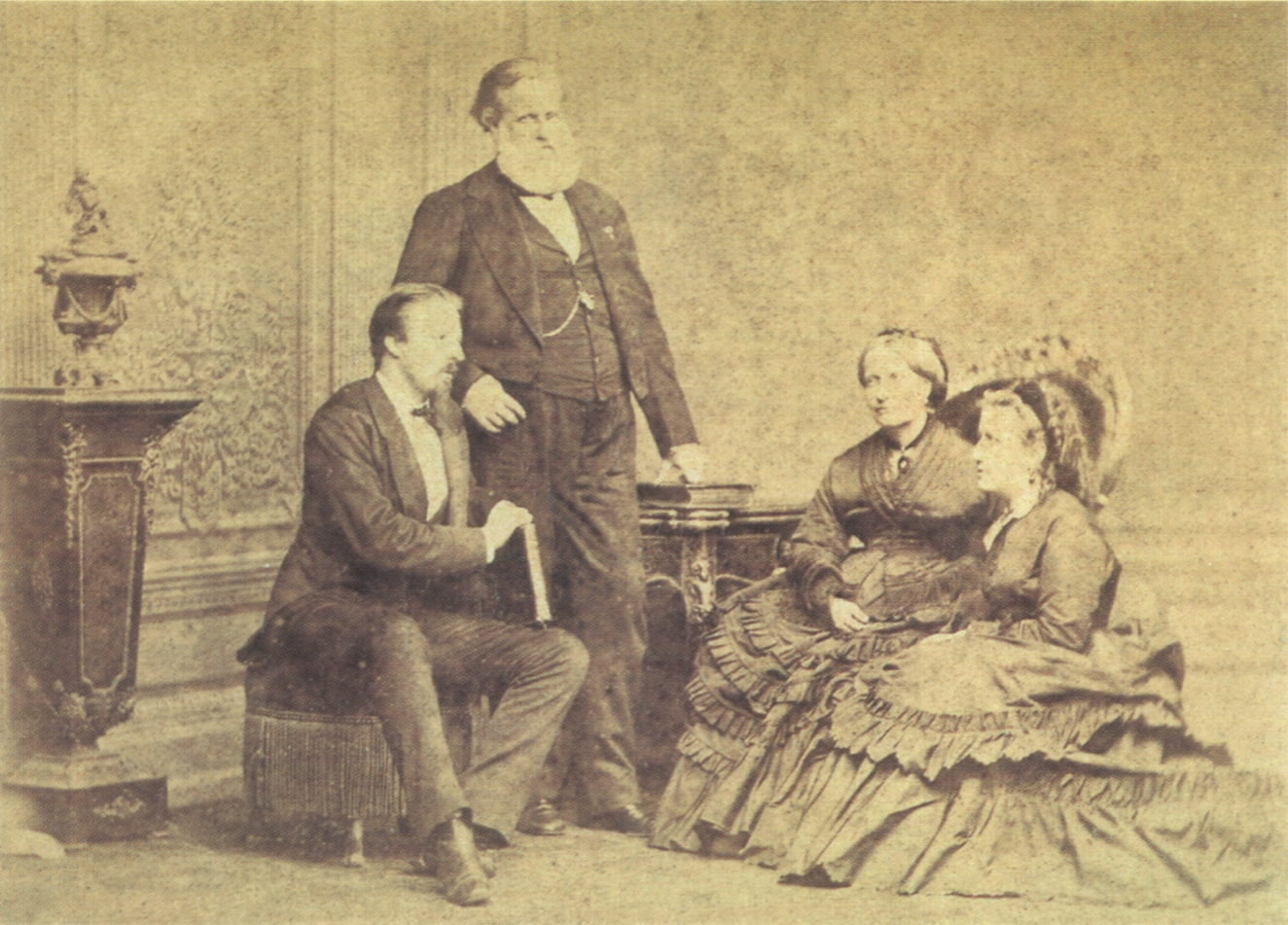
Isabel (right) around age 29 with her parents and husband, c. 1875

Pedro II's behavior as a father was completely different as an emperor. A "man remarkable for his self-control, was at his most affectionate and most outgoing with children, above all his daughters." His daughters, "whom I love deeply", as Pedro II wrote in his diary in 1861, "both loved and admired him." He "was a strict father who demanded obedience", but who, at the same time, was very kind and concerned with his children. However, Pedro II "found difficult if not impossible" to grant intimacy to not only Isabel, but "to any member of his family."

During her upbringing Isabel "absorbed from her instructors conformity to traditional gender roles. She accepted women as dependent and obedient, and indeed her mother's and her governess's behavior did not justify anything else." She "did not lack powers of observation and a certain shrewdness, but she was very accepting of existence as it was and certainly not given to pondering the justification of existence for the established order." All this meant that Isabel would not attempt "a position in life autonomous of her father", even less rival him.

That happened because the Princess Imperial was "at an essential disadvantage with her father. She had a strong personality but she could not turn it to account. As a child she did not share Pedro II's seriousness, his single mindedness, or his interest in the larger world. The coming of adolescence did not improve matters." In fact, she lacked introspection and had a "tendency to take a cheerful view of life". Also, Isabel "did not naturally possess much patience or notable powers of endurance. She moved from one interest to another as each in turn caught her fancy. She was not afraid to speak her mind, and she held strong views. However, when she encountered something she did not like, she found it difficult to focus and organize her resistance so as to make her view prevail. She tended to flare up and then to submit or to lose interest." Isabel's mother, Teresa Cristina, "lived for her family and found fulfillment in making her spouse and her daughters happy." She "created for her family a home life that was secure, safe and predictable." Isabel and her sister "loved their gentle mother and worshipped their demanding but emotionally distant father." From both parents, Isabel inherited a lack of racism. Pedro II surrounded himself with men "regardless of their race." Historian James McMurtry Longo said that as "her father's student, daughter, and heir Princess Isabel followed his example. Race never played a role in her social life, political relationships, alliances or disagreements." And concludes: "It may have been the most important lesson learned from him."

The Imperial family lived in São Cristóvão palace but during the summer (from December to April) went to Pedro II's palace in Petrópolis (nowadays the Imperial Museum of Brazil). Isabel lived an almost completely secluded life from the outside world, far away from the eyes of the Brazilians. She and her sisters had a few friends. Three of them would remain lifelong friends of Isabel: Maria Ribeiro de Avelar (whose mother was a childhood friend of Pedro II's sisters), Maria Amanda de Paranaguá (daughter of João Lustosa da Cunha Paranaguá, the 2nd Marquis of Paranaguá, a member of the Liberal Party and later Prime Minister) and Adelaide Taunay (daughter of Pedro II's former teacher Félix Émile Taunay and sister of Alfredo d'Escragnolle Taunay, Viscount of Taunay). The sole male child who was part of Isabel's all female group was Dominique, the only son of the Countess of Barral, who was regarded by the Princess Imperial and her sister as "the younger brother they never had".

=== Marriage ===
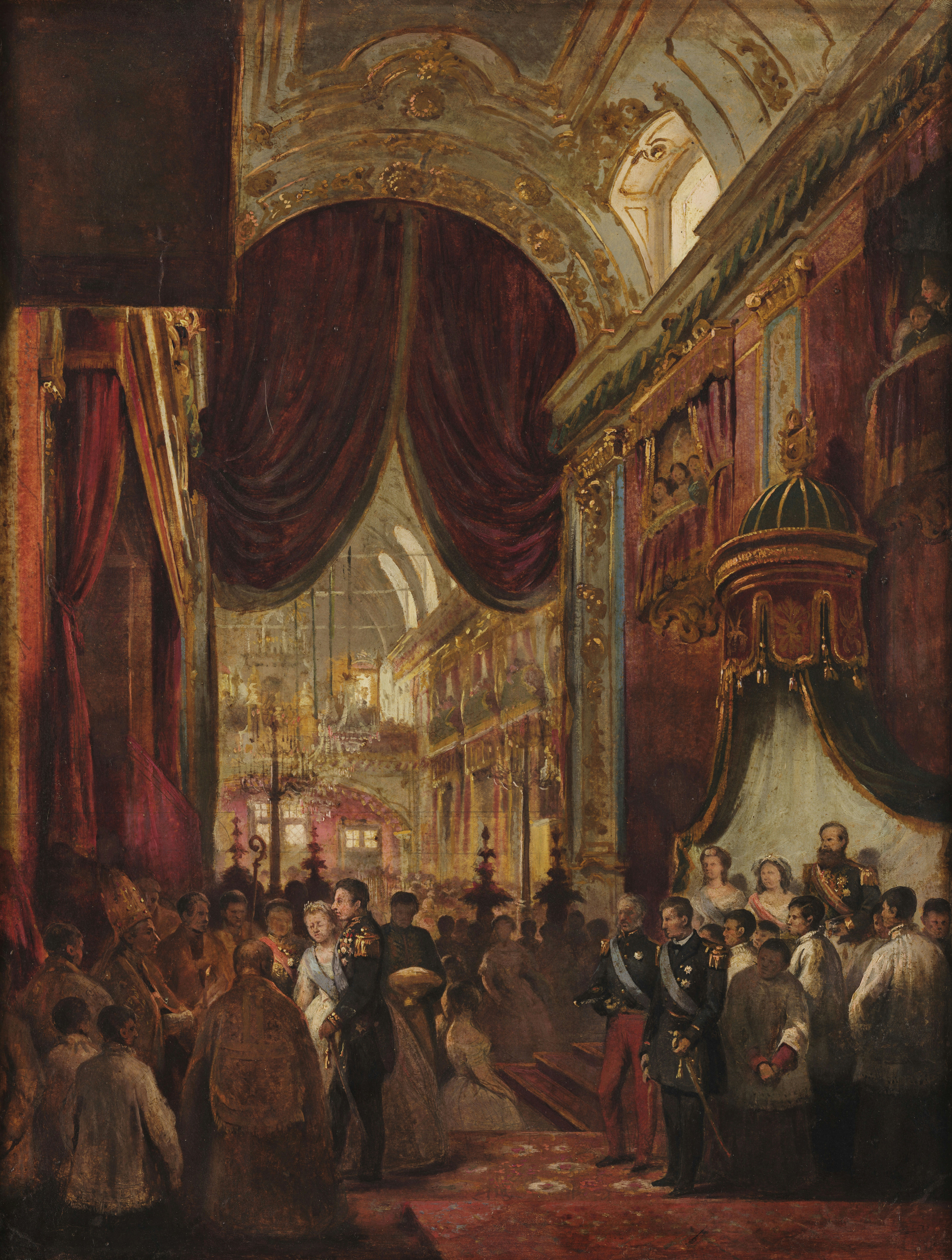
The wedding of Gaston of Orleans and Dona Isabel of Braganza at the Imperial Chapel

Isabel was short, had blue eyes, blond hair, was a little overweight and lacked eyebrows. Her father sought a match among the royal house of France, and initially Pierre, Duke of Penthièvre, the son of the Prince of Joinville, was considered. His mother was Isabel's aunt Princess Francisca of Brazil. Pierre, however, was not interested and declined. Instead, Joinville suggested his nephews, Gaston, Count of Eu, and Prince Ludwig August of Saxe-Coburg and Gotha as suitable choices for the imperial princesses. The two young men travelled to Brazil in August 1864 so that the prospective brides and grooms could meet before a final agreement to the marriage. Isabel and Leopoldina were not informed until Gaston and August were mid-Atlantic. Arriving in early September, Gaston described the princesses as "ugly", but thought Isabel less so than her sister. For her part, Isabel in her own words "began to feel a great and tender love" for Gaston. Gaston and Isabel, and August and Leopoldina, were engaged on 18 September.

On 15 October, Gaston and Isabel were married at the Imperial Chapel in Rio by the archbishop of Bahia. Although Gaston encouraged his wife to read broadly, and the Emperor took her on tours of government offices, her outlook remained one of narrow domesticity. She led a life typical of aristocratic women of her generation. For the first six months of 1865, she and her husband toured Europe. As Brazil had broken off diplomatic relations with Britain, and her French relations had been deposed in France, they travelled as private citizens and met Queen Victoria as relatives not as official state guests. On their return to Brazil, Gaston was called to the battle front of the Paraguayan War by the Emperor, leaving Isabel lonely at Rio. After the conclusion of the war in 1870, Gaston and Isabel again toured Europe. In early 1871, they were in Vienna, where her sister Leopoldina fell fatally ill and died, leaving Isabel the sole surviving child of her parents.

== Regent ==
=== First regency ===
The oath of the Princess Imperial as regent of the Empire of Brazil, c. 1870

Gaston and Isabel returned to Brazil on 1 May 1871, just three weeks before the Emperor and Empress embarked on their own tour of Europe. Isabel was appointed regent with full powers to govern Brazil in the Emperor's absence, though prime minister José Paranhos, Viscount of Rio Branco, and Gaston were expected to hold the reins of power in reality. Following the abolition of slavery in the United States, Pedro II was committed to a gradual program of liberation. On 27 September 1871, with the Emperor still abroad, Isabel signed a new anti-slavery act, passed by the Chamber of Deputies. The Law of Free Birth, as it was called, freed all children born of slaves after that date. On Pedro II's return to Brazil in March 1872, Isabel was once again excluded from government, and resumed private life.

Throughout the first years of her marriage, Isabel was eager to have children, but her first pregnancy ended in miscarriage in October 1872. Worried about her apparent inability to conceive, during a visit to Europe in 1873 she consulted a specialist doctor, and visited the shrine at Lourdes. By December 1873, she was pregnant. Despite Isabel's pleas to remain in Europe until after the birth, the Emperor insisted she returned to Brazil so that the child, who might inherit the throne, would not be born abroad. They arrived at Rio in June 1874. After a labor of 50 hours in late July, the baby died in the womb. Her Catholic faith provided some solace, but her association with ultramontanism, which emphasized the authority of the Church over the government, drew criticism from those who thought the Church should defer to temporal authorities.

Isabel remained concerned throughout her third pregnancy, in 1875, fearful that it would again end in failure. A doctor and midwife from France were brought over for the birth, to the dismay of local physicians whose pride was wounded by Isabel's use of foreign practitioners. After a labor of 13 hours, a boy, baptized Pedro de Alcântara after his grandfather, was delivered with the aid of forceps. Possibly as the result of the difficult delivery, Pedro was born with a disabled left arm.

=== Second regency ===
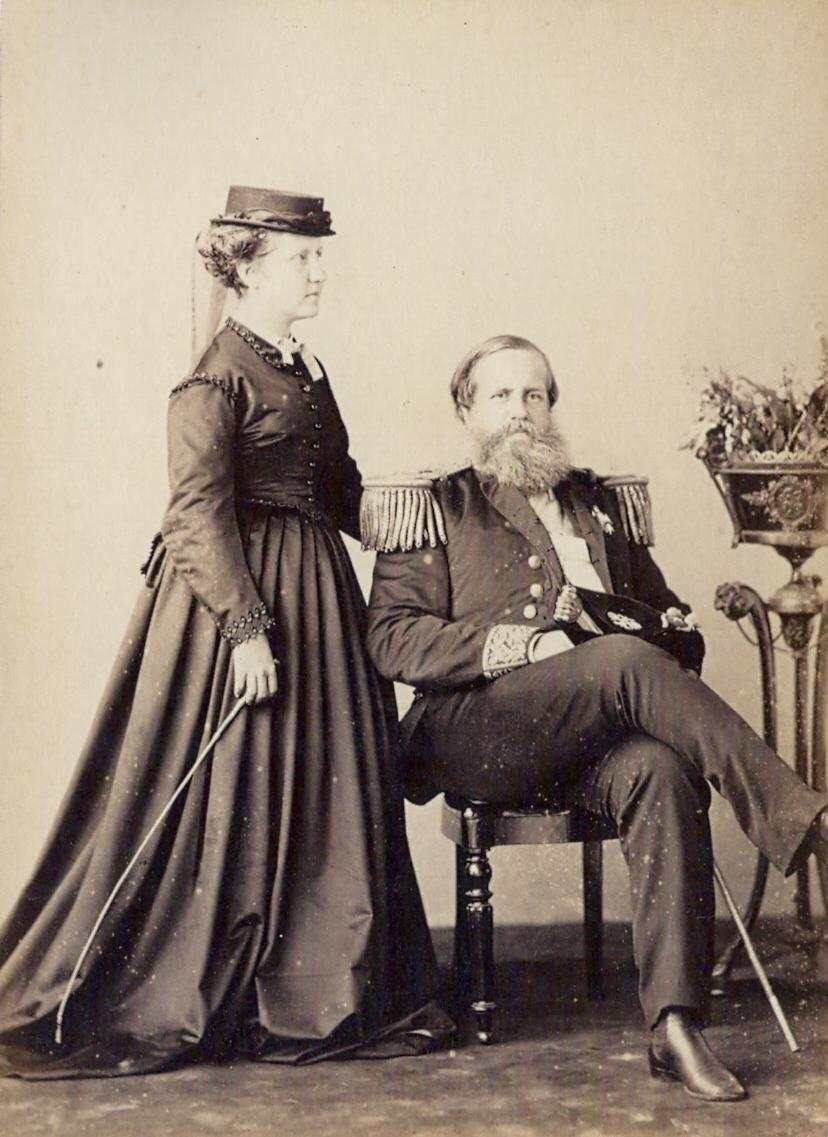
Princess Isabel with her father Emperor Pedro II, c. 1870

The Emperor embarked on a major tour of North America, Europe and the Middle East in March 1876, and Isabel was again made regent. Elections later in the year returned the incumbent government (led by the Duke of Caxias) but fraud and violence during the campaign damaged both its and Isabel's reputations. Her popularity also suffered as a result of continued tension between the Church and State. Adding to her stress, she miscarried on 11 September 1876, and was weakened by loss of blood. At the same time, her husband was also ill with bronchitis, as a result of which he was virtually bed-ridden for three weeks. The couple decided to withdraw from public life, as Gaston explained, "When the princess is no longer seen every day in the streets of Rio, she is forgotten for a while and there is less temptation to denounce each of her acts and decisions to a discontented public." Their seclusion, however, left them isolated and unable to influence public opinion. Throughout the middle of 1877, during a serious drought in northeastern Brazil that threatened public order, Isabel largely remained at home resting because she was again going through a difficult pregnancy.

On Pedro II's return to Brazil in late September 1877, he avoided speaking to Isabel, and distanced himself from the government's actions during the regency by declaring that throughout his entire journey he had not sent "a single telegram on the country's affairs" to any minister or Isabel. Isabel retired to her estate at Petrópolis where she gave birth to a second son, Luiz, in late January 1878. Three months later, Gaston, Isabel and their two sons left Brazil for an extended stay in Europe, where Pedro was to receive medical treatment for his arm. Throughout their stay of three and a half years, Isabel avoided politics and showed no interest in current affairs. Pedro's treatment proved futile, and the couple made plans to return after the birth (with the assistance of forceps) of their final child and third son, Antônio, in August 1881. Isabel and her family returned to Brazil in December 1881.

== Abolitionism and Golden Law ==
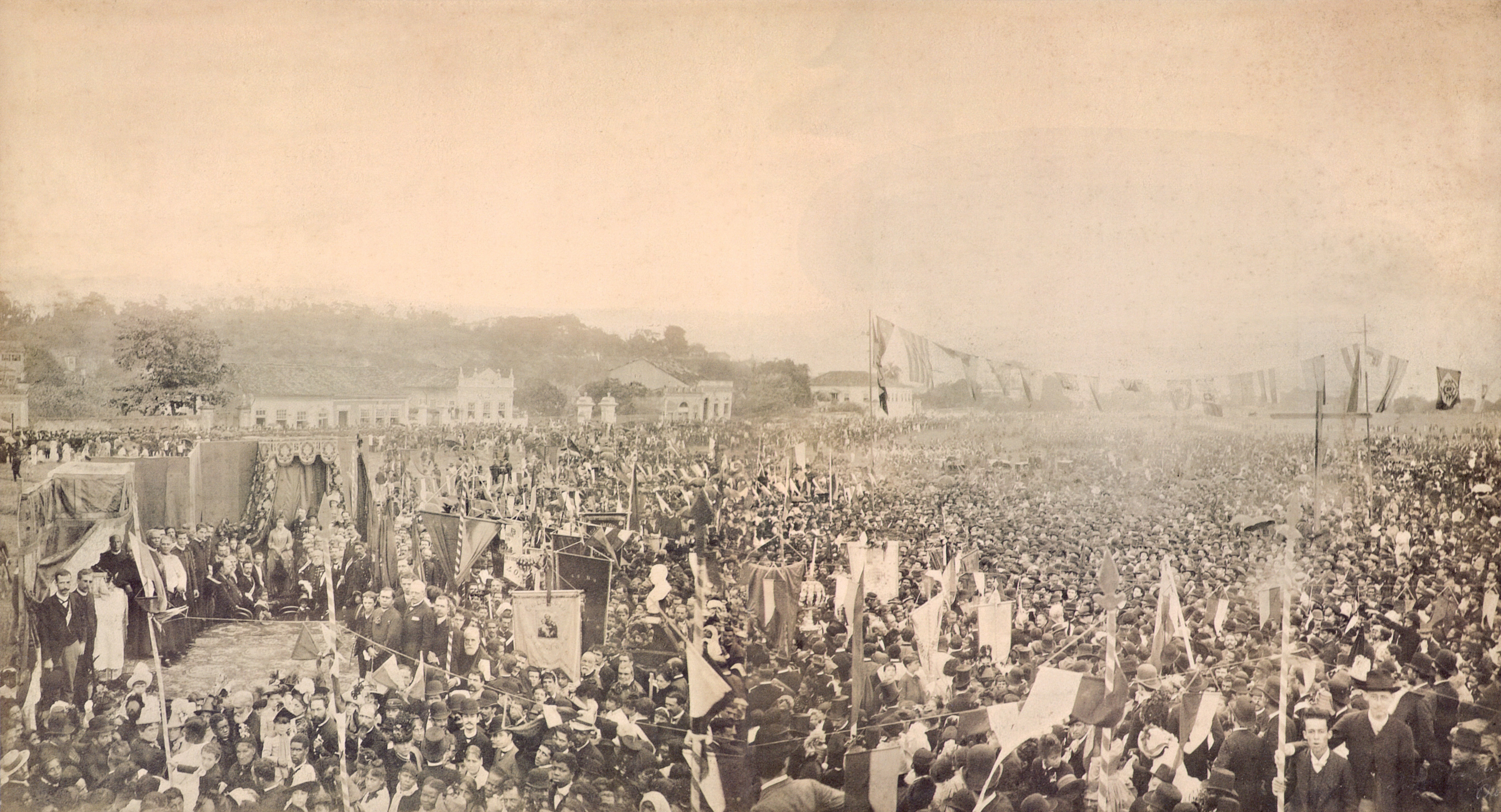
Open mass on 17 May 1888 commemorating the abolition of slavery. Isabel and her husband can be seen under a canopy to the left. The monarchy was never so popular, but at the same time never so frail.

From November 1884 to March 1885, Isabel toured southern Brazil with her husband, and in January 1887, they left Brazil for a six-month visit to Europe. Their trip was cut short, however, as Pedro II fell ill in March, and they returned in early June. The Emperor was advised to seek medical help in Europe, as a result of which he left Brazil on 30 June, leaving Isabel as regent.

Abolitionism in Brazil was growing in strength, but the government of Conservative João Maurício Wanderley, Baron of Cotegipe, attempted to slow the pace of reform. Isabel, in her own words, "became ever more convinced that some action had to be taken" to expand the emancipation program and pressured Cotegipe unsuccessfully to free more slaves. After the Rio Police's mishandling of a pro-abolition demonstration in early 1888, Isabel acted and appointed Conservative João Alfredo Correia de Oliveira in Cotegipe's place.

Oliveira's government supported unconditional abolition and swiftly introduced legislation. On 13 May 1888, Isabel signed the Golden Law (A Lei Áurea), as it was known, which enabled the complete cessation of slavery. Isabel was popularly acclaimed as "the Redemptress" (A Redentora), and was given a Golden Rose by Pope Leo XIII for her actions.

== Exile ==
=== Republican coup d'état ===
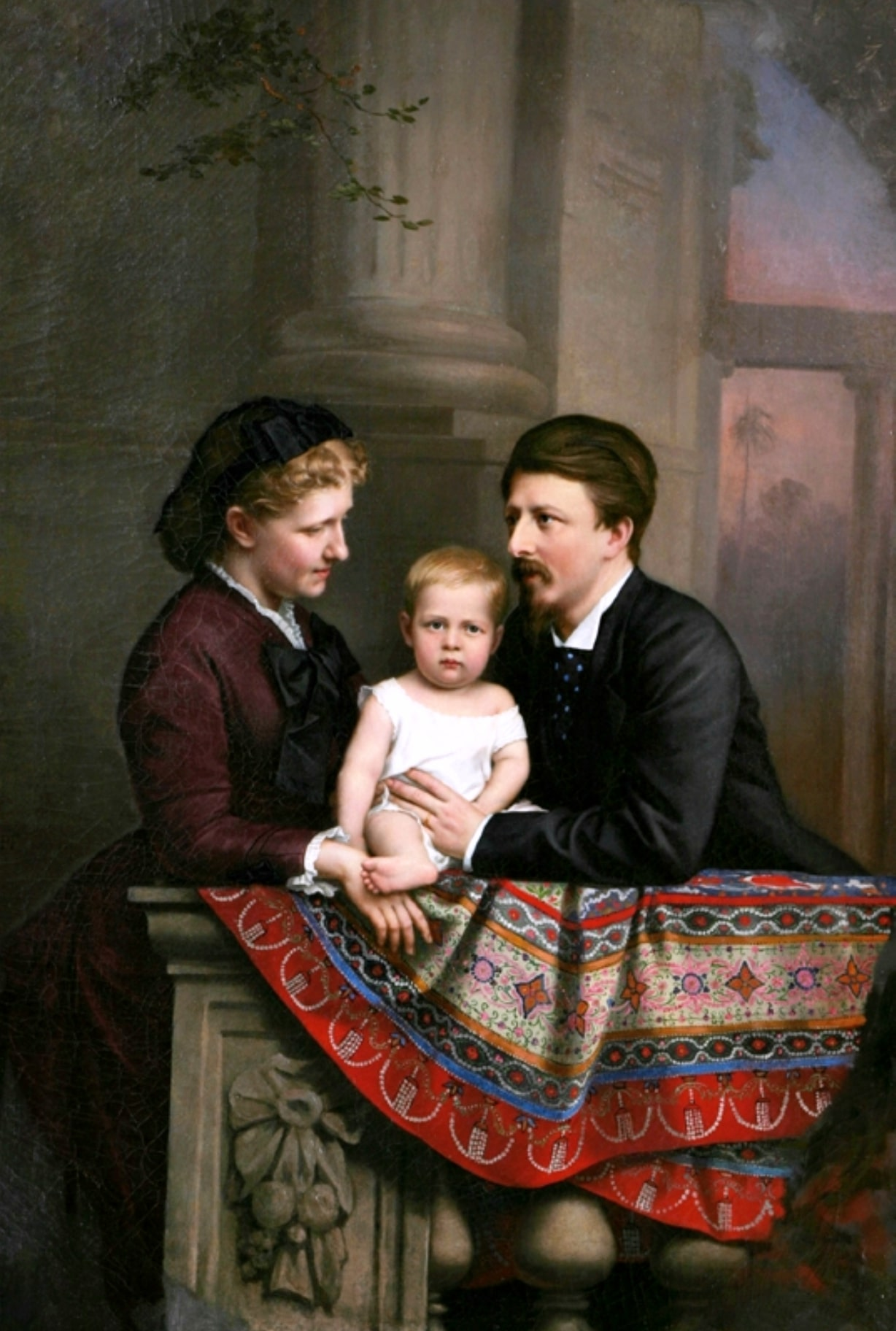
1877 portrait of the Princess Imperial and the Count of Eu with their son Pedro, Prince of Grão-Pará, by Karl Ernst Papf

In August 1888, to Isabel's relief, Pedro II returned from Europe and her regency ended. Gaston wrote:

The avidity and the enthusiasm of the public for the Emperor have been very great, more even more marked, it appears to me, than on previous arrivals. But it is a totally personal homage; because, as I think I have already written, the republican creed has made since his departure last year enormous advances that impress everybody; and, notwithstanding the economic prosperity during the present year, never, for the past 40 years, has the situation of the Brazilian monarchy appeared more shaky than today.

With the Emperor ill and Isabel withdrawn from public life, no effort was made to capitalize on the public popularity engendered by the end of slavery. They had lost the support of slave-owning plantation owners, who held great political, economic and social power. Isabel was uninterested in politics and did not cultivate politicians or public support. Her religious zeal was distrusted, and it was widely assumed that if she became Empress, Gaston would hold power, but Gaston was isolated because of his increasing deafness, and was unpopular because of his foreign birth. Her position was further weakened by the intrigues of her nephew Prince Pedro Augusto of Saxe-Coburg, who was maneuvering to be recognized as Pedro II's heir. Pedro Augusto was told bluntly by his younger brother, "the succession does not belong to her [Isabel], nor to the maimed [Isabel's eldest son Pedro], nor to the deaf [Gaston], nor to you either."

On 15 November 1889, Pedro II was deposed in a military coup. He dismissed all suggestions for quelling the rebellion that politicians and military leaders put forward, and simply commented: "If it is so, it will be my retirement. I have worked too hard and I am tired. I will go rest then." Within two days, he and his family were on their way to exile in Europe.

Isabel released a public statement that read:

It is with my heart riven with sorrow that I take leave of my friends, of all Brazilians, and of the country that I have loved and love so much, and to the happiness of which I have striven to contribute and for which I will continue to hold the most ardent hopes.

=== Later years ===
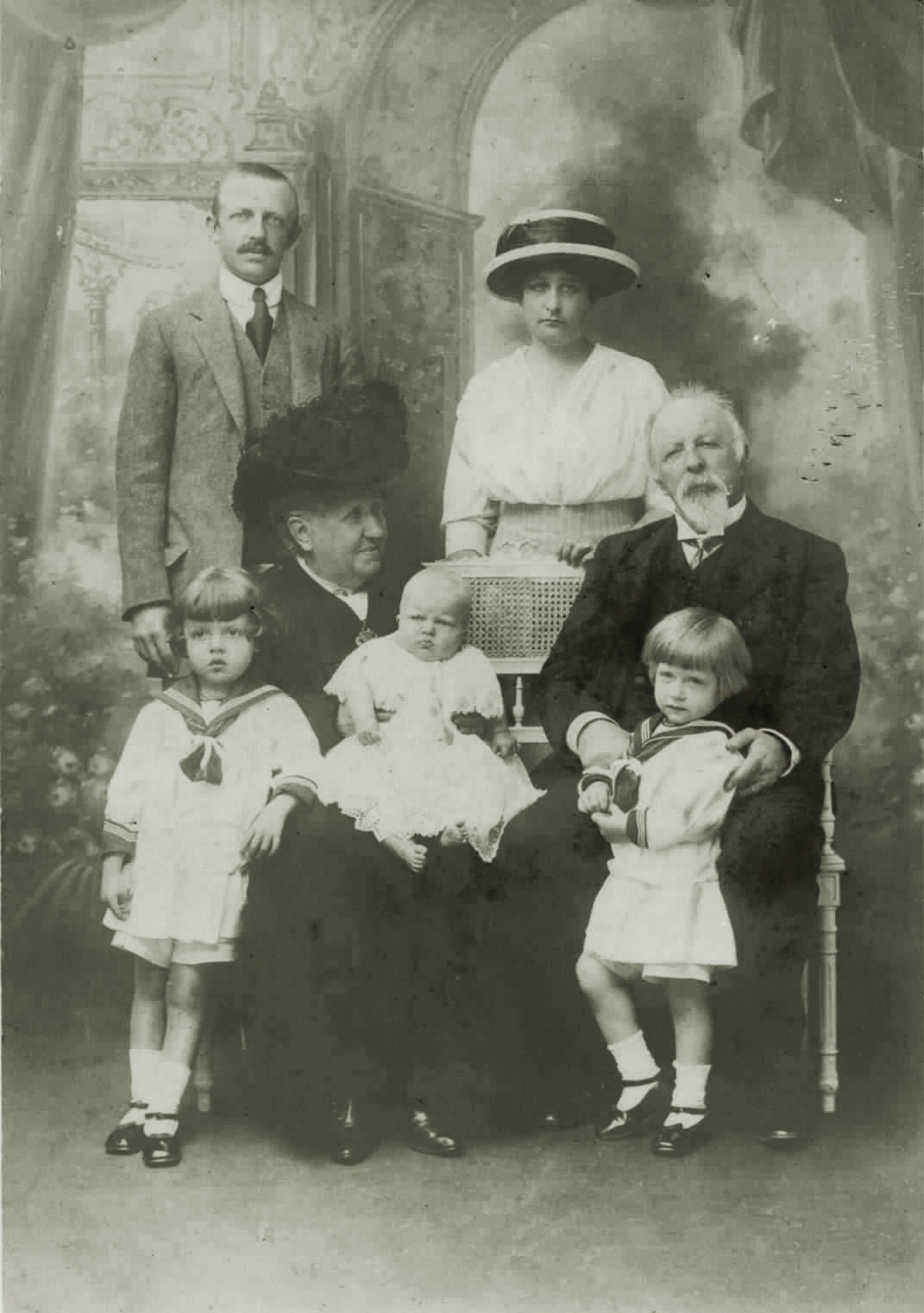
Isabel and the Count of Eu with their son Prince Luís, his wife and children, 1913

The imperial family arrived at Lisbon on 7 December 1889. Three weeks later, Isabel's mother died at Porto, while Isabel and her family were in southern Spain. Back in Portugal, Isabel fainted at her mother's lying in state. Further bad news came from Brazil, as the new government abolished the imperial family's allowances, their only substantial source of income, and declared the family banished. On the back of a large loan from a Portuguese businessman, the imperial family moved into the Hotel Beau Séjour at Cannes.

In early 1890, Isabel and Gaston moved into a private villa, which was far cheaper than the hotel, but their father refused to accompany them and remained at the Beau Séjour. Gaston's father provided them with a monthly allowance. By September, they had taken a villa near Versailles and their sons were enrolled in Parisian schools. Isabel's father died in December 1891, and his property in Brazil was sold with much of the proceeds used to pay off his debts in Europe. Isabel and Gaston purchased a villa in Boulogne-sur-Seine, where they lived an essentially quiet life. Attempts by Brazilian monarchists to restore the crown were unsuccessful, and Isabel lent them only half-hearted support. She thought military action unwise and unwelcome, and correctly assumed that it was unlikely to succeed.

Gaston's father died in 1896, and Gaston's inheritance gave him and Isabel financial security. Their three sons enrolled at a military school in Vienna, and Isabel continued her charitable work associated with the Catholic Church. In 1905, Gaston purchased the château d'Eu in Normandy, the former home of King Louis Philippe I, and the couple furnished it with items received from Brazil in the early 1890s.

By 1908, Isabel's eldest son Pedro wanted to marry an Austro-Hungarian aristocrat Countess Elisabeth Dobrženský of Dobrženitz, but Gaston and Isabel withheld consent because Elisabeth was not a princess. Their consent was only forthcoming when their second son, Luiz, who had travelled to Brazil but had been forbidden to land by the authorities, married Princess Maria di Grazia of Bourbon-Two Sicilies and Pedro renounced his claim to the Brazilian throne in favor of his brother. Luiz and his youngest brother Antônio both served in the British army during World War I (as members of the French royal family they were forbidden to serve in the French military). Luiz was invalided from active service in 1915, and Antônio died from wounds sustained in an air crash shortly after the armistice. Isabel wrote to Gaston that she "went out of [her] mind" with grief "but the Good Lord restored it." Just three months later, Luiz died after a long illness.

=== Death ===
Isabel's own health was deteriorating, and by 1921 she was barely able to walk. She was too ill to travel to Brazil when the republican government lifted the family's banishment in 1920. Gaston and Pedro revisited Brazil in early 1921, for the reburial of Isabel's parents in Petrópolis Cathedral. Isabel died before the end of the year, and was buried in her husband's family tomb at Dreux's chapel royal. Gaston died the following year. In 1953, the remains of Gaston and Isabel were repatriated to Brazil, and in 1971 they were interred in the Cathedral of Petrópolis.

== Legacy ==
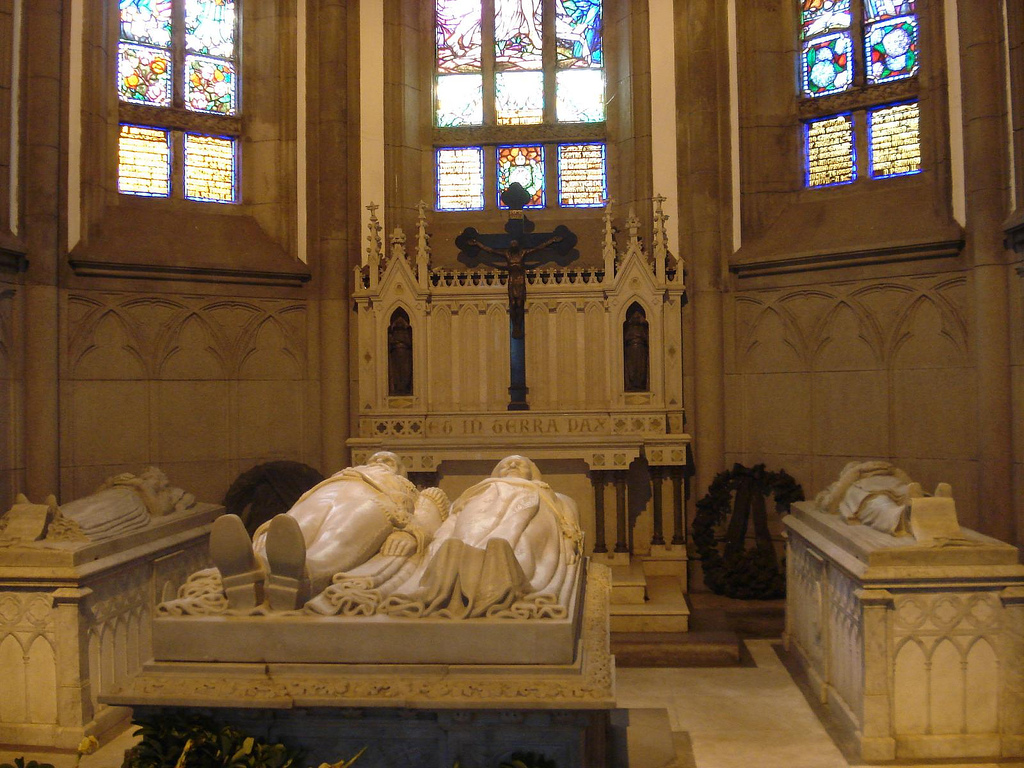
Tomb of Princess Isabel (far left) in the Imperial Mausoleum, inside the Cathedral of Petrópolis, Brazil

Historian Roderick J. Barman wrote that "in the view of posterity, [Isabel] acted decisively only once on a single issue: the immediate abolition of slavery". It is for this achievement that she is remembered. As explained by Barman, paradoxically this "principal exercise of power by which posterity alone remembers her ... contributed to her exclusion from public life". Isabel herself wrote, on the day after the republican coup d'état that deposed her father, "If abolition is the cause for this, I don't regret it; I consider it worth losing the throne for."

== Titles and honors ==
Styles of Isabel, Princess Imperial of Brazil
- Reference style: Her Imperial Highness
- Spoken style: Your Imperial Highness

=== Titles and styles ===
- 29 July 1846 – 11 June 1847: Her Highness The Princess Dona Isabel of Brazil
- 11 June 1847 – 19 July 1848: Her Imperial Highness The Princess Imperial
- 19 July 1848 – 9 January 1850: Her Highness The Princess Dona Isabel of Brazil
- 9 January 1850 – 14 November 1921: Her Imperial Highness The Princess Imperial
  - 15 October 1864 – 14 November 1921: signed her private letters as "Isabel, Condessa d'Eu"
  - 1871–72, 1876–77, 1887–88: Her Imperial Highness The Princess Imperial Regent

The Princess's full style and title was "Her Imperial Highness Senhora Dona Isabel, Princess Imperial of Brazil."

=== Honors ===
Princess Isabel was a recipient of the following Brazilian orders:

- Grand Cross of the Order of Christ
- Grand Cross of the Order of Saint Benedict of Aviz
- Grand Cross of the Order of Saint James of the Sword
- Grand Cross of the Order of the Southern Cross
- Grand Cross of the Order of Pedro I
- Grand Cross of the Order of the Rose

She was a recipient of the following foreign honors:

- Band of the Spanish Order of Queen Maria Luisa, 2 January 1855
- Band of the Portuguese Order of Saint Isabel
- Insignia of the Austrian Order of the Starry Cross
- Grand Cross of the Mexican Imperial Order of Saint Charles, 10 April 1865

== Genealogy ==
=== Ancestry ===
Ancestors of Isabel, Princess Imperial of Brazil

8. John VI of Portugal and Brazil
4. Pedro I of Brazil and IV of Portugal
9. Carlota Joaquina of Spain
2. Pedro II of Brazil
10. Francis II, Holy Roman Emperor
5. Maria Leopoldina of Austria
11. Maria Theresa of Naples and Sicily
1. Isabel, Princess Imperial of Brazil
12. Ferdinand I of the Two Sicilies
6. Francis I of the Two Sicilies
13. Maria Carolina of Austria
3. Teresa Cristina of the Two Sicilies
14. Charles IV of Spain
7. Maria Isabella of Spain
15. Maria Luisa of Parma

=== Issue ===
Isabel's marriage with Gaston produced three sons and one daughter. The eldest son, who was named after her father, as the firstborn son of the heir presumptive, was given the title of Prince of Grão Pará. Isabel's children were:

- Dona Luísa Vitória of Orléans-Braganza (1874–1874, stillborn)
- Dom Pedro de Alcântara of Orléans-Braganza (1875–1940)
- Dom Luíz of Orléans-Braganza (1878–1920)
- Dom Antônio of Orléans-Braganza (1881–1918)

== Footnotes ==
Isabel, Princess Imperial of Brazil House of Braganza Cadet branch of the House of Aviz Born: 29 July 1846 Died: 14 November 1921
Brazilian royalty
Preceded by Prince Afonso	Princess Imperial of Brazil; 11 June 1847 – 19 July 1848	Succeeded by Prince Pedro
Preceded by Prince Pedro	Princess Imperial of Brazil; 9 January 1850 – 15 November 1889	Monarchy abolished
Titles in pretence
Republic declared	Princess Imperial of Brazil; 15 November 1889 – 5 December 1891	Succeeded by Prince Pedro de Alcântara
Preceded by Pedro II	— TITULAR — Empress of Brazil; 5 December 1891 – 14 November 1921; Reason for succession failure: Empire abolished in 1889	Succeeded by Prince Pedro Henrique
