= Pedro Afonso, Prince Imperial of Brazil =

Heir apparent to the Brazilian throne (1848–1850)

Pedro Afonso
- Prince Imperial of Brazil
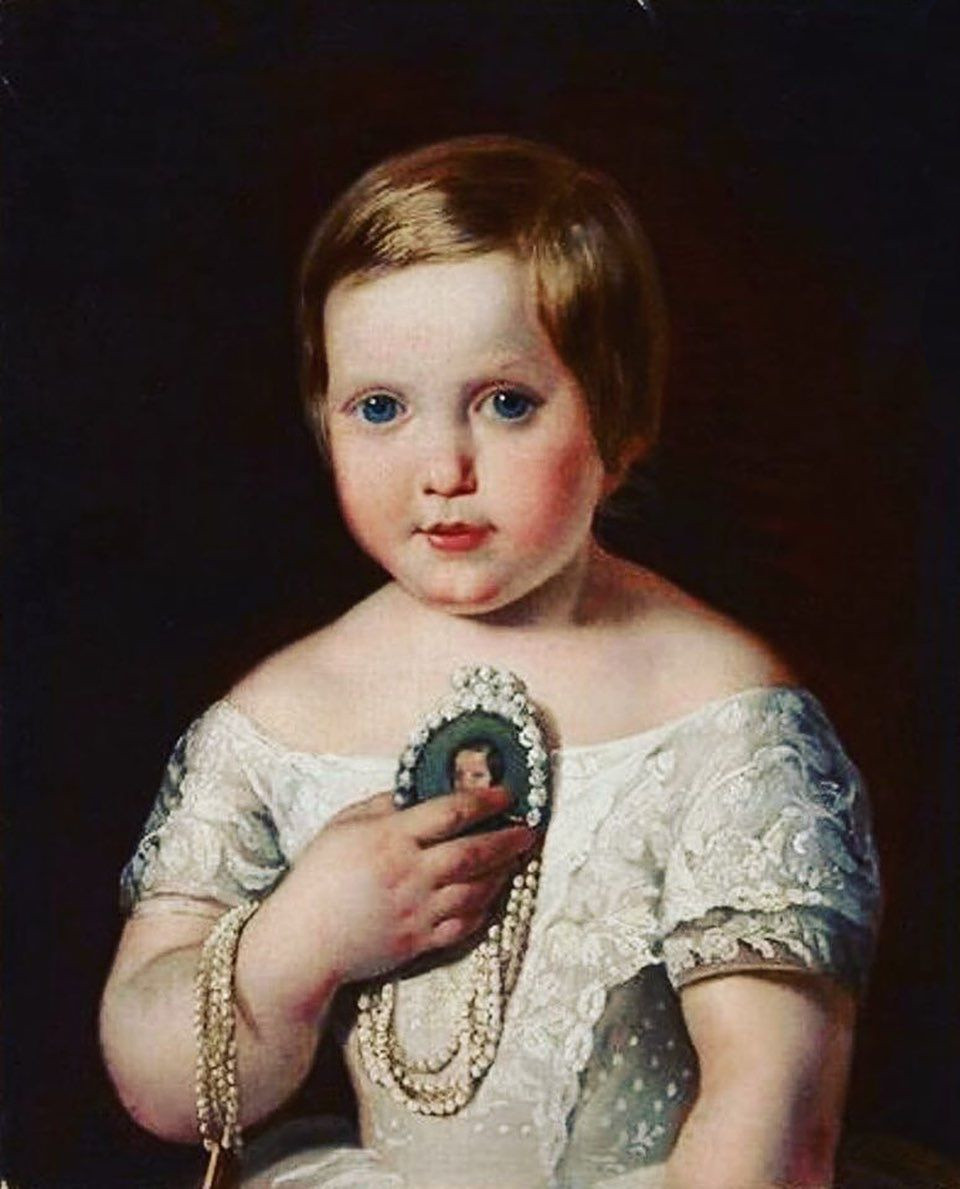
- 1850 portrait
- Born: 19 July 1848; Palace of São Cristóvão, Rio de Janeiro, Empire of Brazil
- Died: 10 January 1850 (aged 1); Imperial Palace of Santa Cruz, Rio de Janeiro, Empire of Brazil
- Burial: Convent of Saint Anthony, Rio de Janeiro, Brazil
Names
- Pedro Afonso Cristiano Leopoldo Eugênio Fernando Vicente Miguel Gabriel Rafael Gonzaga
- House: Braganza
- Father: Pedro II of Brazil
- Mother: Teresa Cristina of the Two Sicilies

Dom Pedro Afonso (19 July 1848 – 10 January 1850) was the Prince Imperial and heir apparent to the throne of the Empire of Brazil. Born at the Palace of São Cristóvão in Rio de Janeiro, he was the second son and youngest child of Emperor Dom Pedro II and Dona Teresa Cristina of the Two Sicilies, and thus a member of the Brazilian branch of the House of Braganza. Pedro Afonso was seen as vital to the future viability of the monarchy, which had been put in jeopardy by the death of his older brother Dom Afonso almost three years earlier.

Pedro Afonso's death from fever at the age of one devastated the Emperor, and the imperial couple had no further children. Pedro Afonso's older sister Dona Isabel became heiress, but Pedro II was unconvinced that a woman could ever be accepted as monarch by the ruling elite. He excluded Isabel from matters of state and failed to provide training for her possible role as empress. With no surviving male children, the Emperor came to understand that the imperial line was destined to end with his own death.

== Infancy and early death ==
=== Birth ===
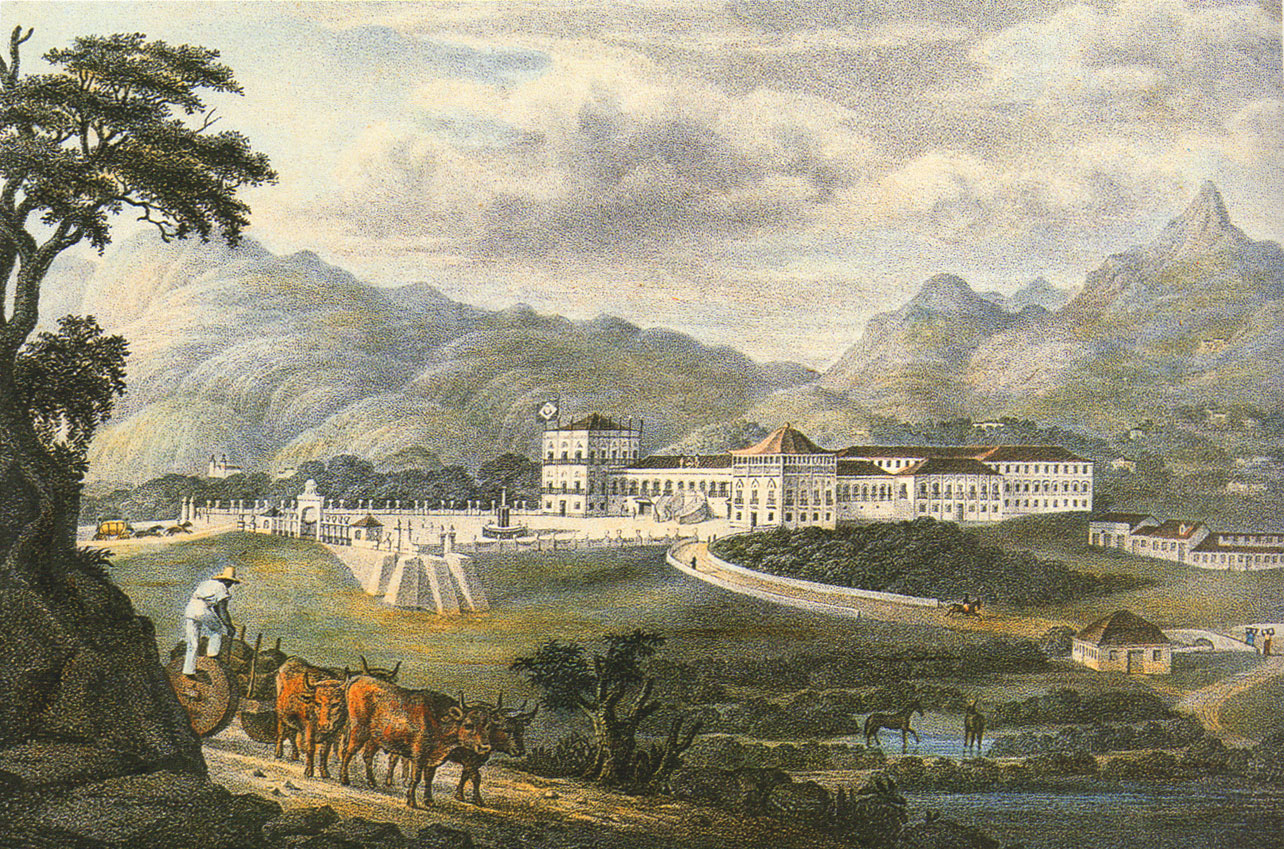
The Palace of São Cristóvão about a decade before the birth of Pedro Afonso

Pedro Afonso was born at 08:00 on 19 July 1848 in the Palace of São Cristóvão in Rio de Janeiro, Brazil. His full name was Pedro Afonso Cristiano Leopoldo Eugênio Fernando Vicente Miguel Gabriel Rafael Gonzaga. Through his father, Emperor Pedro II, he was a member of the Brazilian branch of the House of Braganza and was referred to using the honorific Dom (Lord) from birth. He was the grandson of Emperor Dom Pedro I and the nephew of the reigning Queen of Portugal, Dona Maria II. Through his mother, Teresa Cristina, he was a grandson of Don Francesco I (Francis I) and nephew to Don Ferdinando II (Ferdinand II), who ruled as kings of the Two Sicilies in turn.

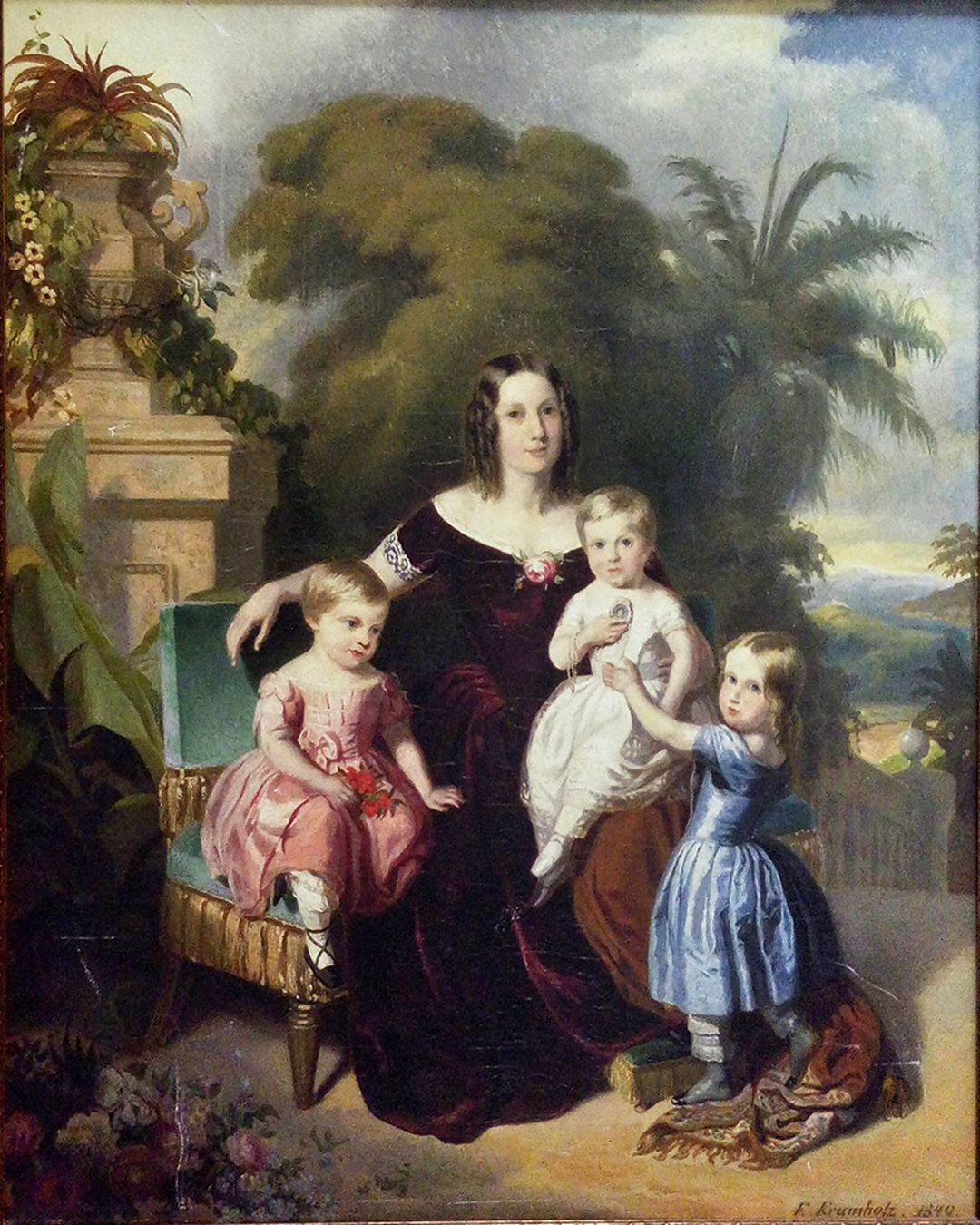
An unbreeched Prince Pedro Afonso seated on his mother's lap while surrounded by his sisters, 1849

Following the birth, Pedro II received official congratulations at a formal reception held later that day, which according to a contemporary was an event "more splendid and better attended" than any since the Emperor was declared of age in 1840. News of the birth of a male heir was received with rejoicing among the Brazilian people. Celebrations included skyrockets and artillery salutes. City streets were illuminated for days after the birth, and an elaborate gala was held at court. The birth of Pedro Afonso was widely welcomed, as a male heir was regarded as imperative for the Empire's continuation, even though the constitution allowed for female succession. Writer Manuel de Araújo Porto Alegre (later Baron of Santo Ângelo) considered the birth of Pedro Afonso a "triumph" that had secured the succession.

Pedro Afonso's baptism took place on 4 October 1848. The ceremony was held privately in the Imperial Chapel, followed by public celebrations. The godparents were his granduncle Emperor Ferdinand I of Austria and his step-grandmother Amélie of Leuchtenberg. Prime Minister and former regent Pedro de Araújo Lima (then-Viscount and later Marquis of Olinda) and Mariana de Verna, Countess of Belmont represented the godparents, who were not present. Fireworks entertained the crowds, and a band shell that could hold more than a hundred musicians was raised for the festivities that followed. According to historian Hendrik Kraay, royal baptisms in imperial Brazil "stressed that the princes and princesses secured the dynasty's future". As the sole surviving male child, Pedro Afonso took precedence in the line of succession over his two older sisters, Dona Isabel and Dona Leopoldina. Pedro Afonso, as heir apparent to the Brazilian throne, was styled "Prince Imperial" from birth.

=== Death ===
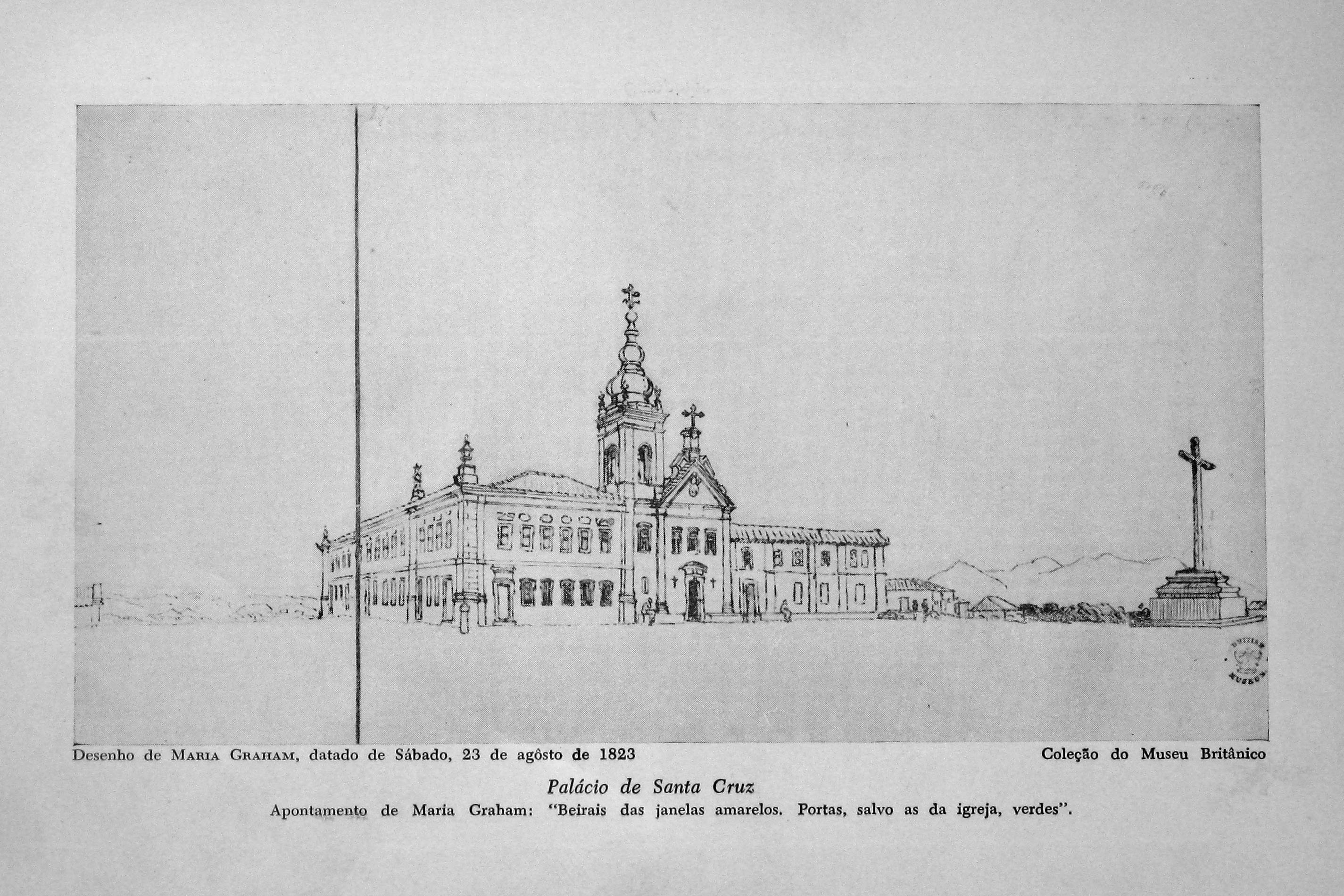
The Santa Cruz Estate a couple of decades before Pedro Afonso's death

In 1847 and the two following years, Pedro II and his family spent the summer at Petrópolis. The traditional summer residence of the imperial family was at Santa Cruz Estate, a rural property that had belonged to the Braganzas for generations. The shift to Petrópolis seemed an unwelcome novelty among members of the court, "who disliked any change that threatened the established ways and interests". Bowing to tradition, the Emperor decided to again summer at Santa Cruz in 1850. During the imperial family's stay at the rural estate, Pedro Afonso and his sister Isabel were struck by fever. The princess eventually recovered, but the Prince Imperial died of convulsions at 04:20 on 10 January. Contemporaries argued that either encephalitis or a congenital disorder may have caused his death.

Pedro II regarded the death of his son as "the most fatal blow that I could ever receive, and certainly I would not have survived were it not that I still have a wife and two children". The Emperor wrote to his brother-in-law Dom Fernando II, King-consort of Portugal: "By the time you receive this, you will certainly have learnt of the grievous loss I have undergone ... God who has made me pass through so hard a testing, will in his mercy give me grounds to console my sorrows." Pedro II had already lost another son, Dom Afonso, almost three years earlier. He revealed his inner turmoil in a sonnet: "Twice already I have suffered death, for the father dies who sees his son is dead." Except for brief inspection visits, the Emperor avoided Santa Cruz thereafter.

A grand funeral was held for the Prince Imperial two days after his death. The streets were crowded with ordinary people who greatly mourned the prince's death. So remarkable was the event that tourists paid for the privilege of watching the funeral procession from a hotel in downtown Rio de Janeiro. Pedro Afonso was buried in the mausoleum of the Convento de Santo Antônio (Convent of Saint Anthony) in Rio de Janeiro.

=== Legacy ===
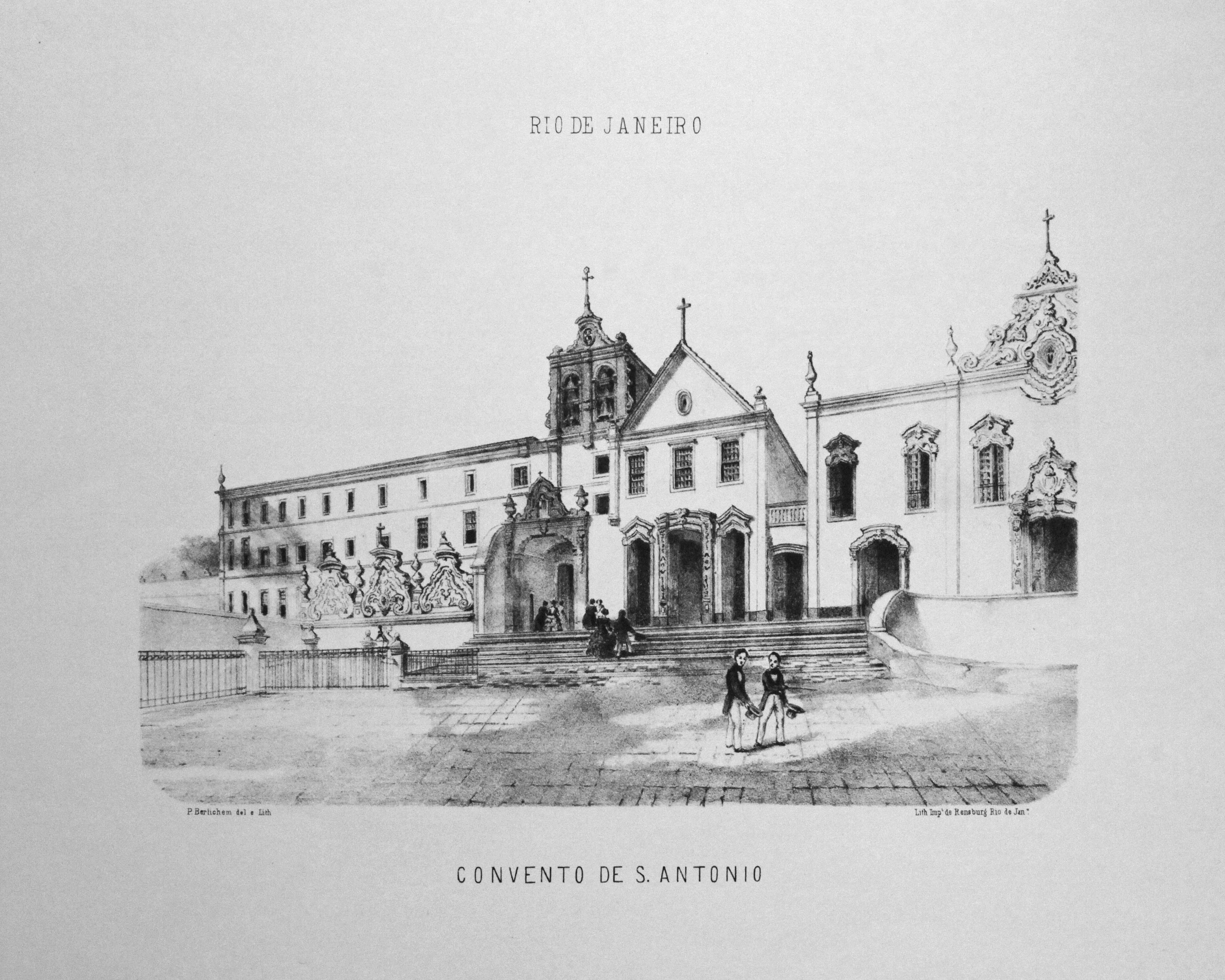
Convent of Saint Anthony, where Prince Pedro Afonso is buried, 1856

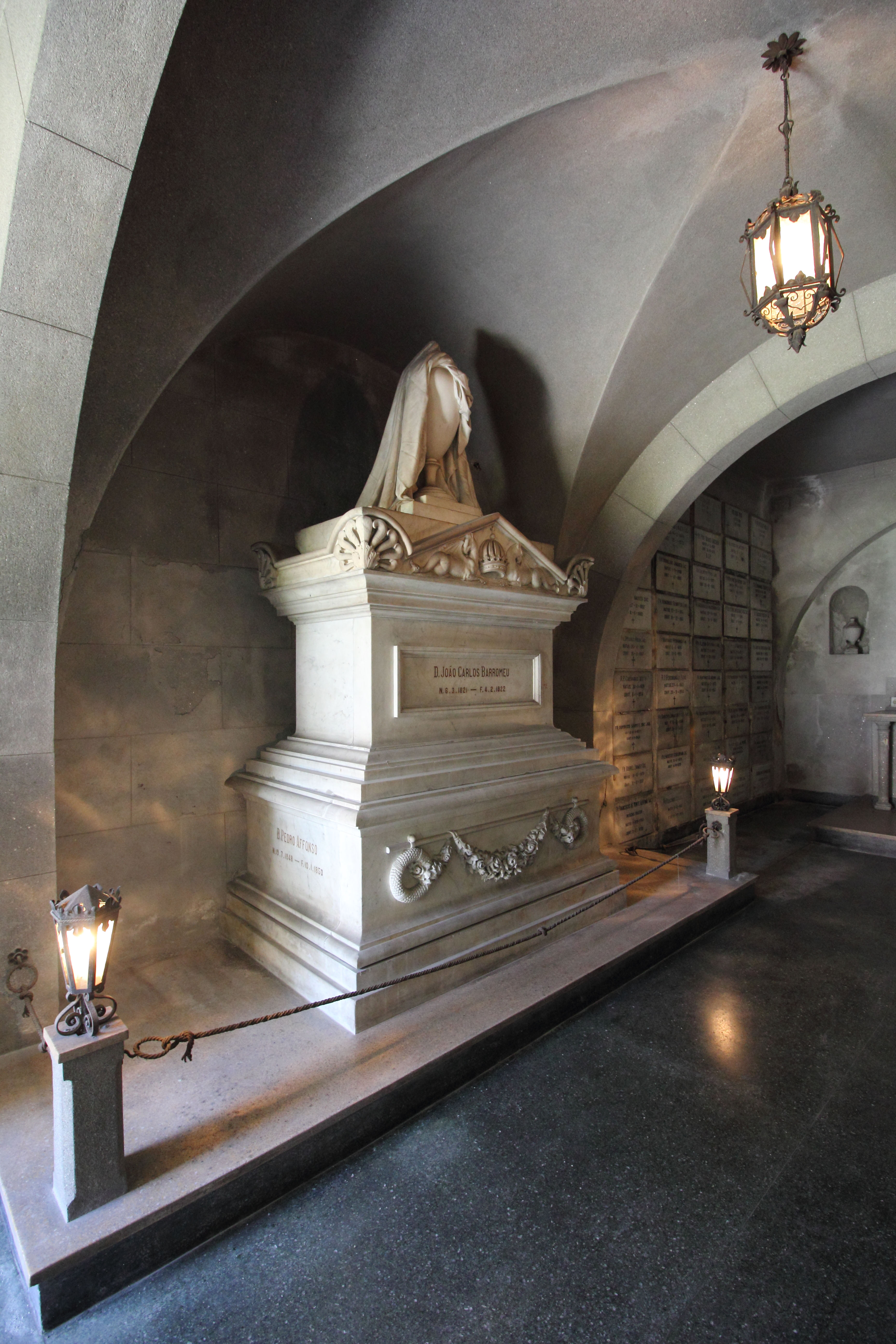
The grave of princes Pedro Afonso, João Carlos, and Afonso.

Honório Hermeto Carneiro Leão (later Marquis of Paraná), one of Brazil's leading politicians and then serving as president (governor) of the province of Pernambuco, summarized the prevalent view among Brazil's ruling elite regarding the succession of the Empire when he addressed the Provincial Assembly: "It is my painful duty to inform you of the death of the Prince Imperial D. Pedro Afonso, which occurred on 10 January of the current year. It is the second time we lose the heir presumptive of the crown." Honório Hermeto continued: "It must serve as a consolation to us, the certainty of [good] health of H[is]. M[ajesty]. the Emperor and his august wife. Both in the prime of their years, and full of life, still promise both numerous fruits from their conjugal bed as well as a male succession to the crown, as required for both the consolidation of our still recent institutions and the restless spirit of the century."

What no one could foresee was that Pedro II and Teresa Cristina would have no more children. The reason is unknown, although scholars think it is probably because they no longer had sexual intercourse. The Emperor was devastated by the death of Pedro Afonso and was never able to cope with it entirely. According to historian Roderick J. Barman, Pedro II was "deeply affected, emotionally and intellectually". The Emperor wrote a sonnet that expressed his feelings:

But who can recount what feels the broken soul
of the father from whom, of God, your sword cuts off
the flower of his future, the beloved child.

In the Emperor's eyes, the deaths of his sons seemed to presage the end of the imperial system. His younger son had represented his future and that of the monarchy. Although the Emperor still had a legal successor in his daughter Isabel, he had little confidence that a woman could rule Brazil in the male-dominated social climate of the time. He did nothing to prepare Isabel for the responsibilities of ascending the throne, nor did he attempt to encourage acceptance of a female ruler among the political class. The lack of a male heir caused him to lose motivation in promoting the imperial office as a position to be carried on by his descendants; he increasingly saw the imperial system as so inextricably linked to himself that it could not survive him.

== Titles and styles ==
Styles of Pedro, Prince Imperial
- Reference style: His Imperial Highness
- Spoken style: Your Imperial Highness

- 19 July 1848 – 9 January 1850: His Imperial Highness The Prince Imperial

The prince's full style and title was "His Imperial Highness Dom Pedro, Prince Imperial of Brazil".

== Honors ==
The Prince Imperial was a recipient of the following Brazilian Orders:

- Major Commander of the Order of Christ
- Major Commander of the Order of Saint Benedict of Aviz
- Major Commander of the Order of Saint James of the Sword
- Grand Cross of the Order of Pedro I
- Grand Cross and Grand Major Dignitary of the Order of the Rose

== Ancestry ==
Ancestors of Pedro, Prince Imperial of Brazil

8. John VI of Portugal and Brazil
4. Pedro I of Brazil and IV of Portugal
9. Carlota Joaquina of Spain
2. Pedro II of Brazil
10. Francis II, Holy Roman Emperor
5. Maria Leopoldina of Austria
11. Maria Theresa of Naples and Sicily
1. Pedro, Prince Imperial of Brazil
12. Ferdinand I of the Two Sicilies
6. Francis I of the Two Sicilies
13. Maria Carolina of Austria
3. Teresa Cristina of the Two Sicilies
14. Charles IV of Spain
7. Maria Isabella of Spain
15. Maria Luisa of Parma

== Footnotes ==
Pedro Afonso, Prince Imperial of Brazil House of Bragança Cadet branch of the House of Aviz Born: 19 July 1848 Died: 9 January 1850
Brazilian royalty
| Preceded by Princess Isabel | Prince Imperial of Brazil; 19 July 1848 – 9 January 1850 | Succeeded by Princess Isabel |
