= Prince Luigi, Count of Aquila =

Count of Aquila (1824–1897)

Prince Louis
- Count of Aquila
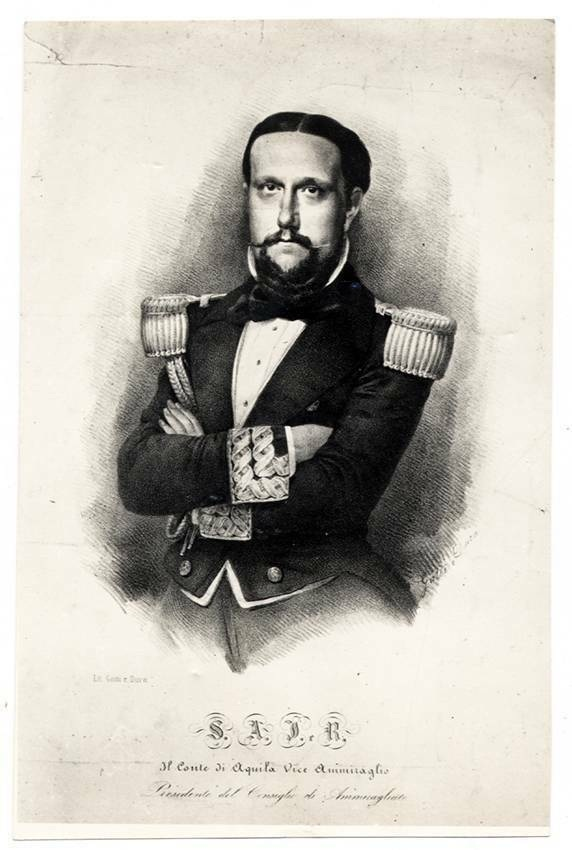
- Born: 19 July 1824; Royal Palace of Naples, Two Sicilies
- Died: 5 March 1897 (aged 72); Paris, France
- Burial: Père Lachaise Cemetery
- Spouse: Januária, Princess Imperial of Brazil (m. 1844)
- Issue: Prince Luigi, Count of Roccaguglielma; Princess Maria Isabella; Prince Filippo, Count of Espina; Princess Germana; Prince Emanuele
Names
- Italian: Luigi Carlo Maria Giuseppe Gaspar Baldassarre Melchiorre Gennaro Rosalino Ferdinando Francesco d'Assisi Francesco di Paola Francesco di Sales Antonio Abate Benedetto Lucio Donato Bonoso Andrea d'Avellino Luitgardo Rite Gertrude Venanzio Taddeo Spiridione Rocco Vincenzo Ferreri Camillo Vincenzo di Paola Domenico
- House: Bourbon-Two Sicilies
- Father: Francis I of the Two Sicilies
- Mother: Maria Isabella of Spain

Prince Luigi, Count of Aquila (19 July 1824 – 5 March 1897) was a prince and military man, a member of the Italian branch of the House of Bourbon, and husband of Princess Januária of Brazil, daughter of Emperor Dom Pedro I. He was the thirteenth child of King Francis I of the Two Sicilies and Queen Consort Maria Isabella of Spain.

Born as Prince of the Two Sicilies, his siblings included the Queen of Spain, the Empress of Brazil, the Duchess of Berry, the Grand Duchess of Tuscany, and the King of the Two Sicilies.

He married Princess Januária of Brazil, daughter of Emperor Pedro I of Brazil, becoming an honorary admiral of the Brazilian Imperial Navy. The couple settled in Naples, where Louis served as vice-admiral of the royal navy, eventually being elected viceroy of Sicily in January 1848, and where their six children were born, residing in the kingdom until the invasion of Garibaldi's troops in 1861.

== Birth and childhood ==
Prince Louis was born at 3:30 a.m. on July 19, 1824, in the Royal Palace of Naples. His birth was registered by the mayor of Naples, who also held the position of extraordinary official of the Civil State of the Kingdom, Giuseppe Pignatelli, Marquis of Casalnuovo. He was the eleventh child of the then Duke of Calabria (heir to the throne) Francis, later King Francis I of the Two Sicilies, and his second wife, Infanta Maria Isabel of Spain, herself the daughter of King Charles IV of Spain and Queen Maria Luisa of Parma. Through his father, the prince therefore belonged to the Italian branch of the House of Bourbon, while through his mother he descended from the Bourbons of Spain and Parma.

He received the title of "Count of Aquila," granted by Royal Decree on September 19, 1824. His father died when he was only 6 years old, and his mother later married an officer of the Royal Guard, paying little attention to her children. The numerous heirs were educated by tutors who were not always of proven competence. The princes, and Louis in particular, were fortunate that their older brother, King Ferdinand II of the Two Sicilies, was a remarkable monarch who not only administered the kingdom very well but also personally oversaw the education of his brothers. His family was absolutely devoted to the Church and in constant contact with the Vatican, particularly with Pope Pius IX.

After primary school, religion, and foreign languages, it was decided that Louis would be destined for the Navy, and at the age of 15, he was given his uniform and the prince began his career at sea. It should be emphasized that at that time the Royal Navy of the Two Sicilies was the third largest in Europe, behind only England and the Kingdom of France. Louis served aboard several frigates, such as the "Zeffiro", the "Valoroso" and the "Amélia", undertaking training voyages and visits to almost all the ports of the Mediterranean Sea. In letters to his brother, the king requested information about naval activities and recommended the observance of the precepts of the "Holy Mother Church". In addition to information from Tommaso's captain, the commanders of the various ships were to keep the king constantly informed about the prince's progress.

In 1843, the prince was not yet twenty years old, but his future greatly interested the chancelleries of the great powers. The question of the marriage of the young Queen Isabella II of Spain and her younger sister divided Europe, the United Kingdom, and France. The proposal of the Count of Aquila to the Spanish government as the sovereign's fiancé was considered. However, the Neapolitan prince had other plans in mind and refused the offer made to him.

== Trip to Brazil ==
In March 1843, one of the sisters of the Count of Aquila, Princess Teresa Cristina of Bourbon-Two Sicilies, left Naples to marry Emperor Pedro II of Brazil in Rio de Janeiro. Since the prince had joined the navy of the Two Sicilies, King Ferdinand II entrusted him with accompanying the young woman to her new country.

The designation of the Count of Aquila is not, however, accidental. Dom Pedro II's older sister, Princess Januária, being his only heir, was prohibited by the Brazilian Constitution of 1824 from leaving her country until her brother had children. However, the Empire of Brazil did not have a sufficiently high party to marry the young woman, and therefore it was imperative that a European prince settle in the country to marry her and ensure dynastic continuity. The Count of Aquila, being placed far down the line of succession to the Neapolitan throne, could easily settle in Rio de Janeiro.

He first met the princess in September 1843, and the two young people quickly fell in love. The emperor agreed to formalize the union, and Louis left for the Kingdom of the Two Sicilies on October 1 to ask the king for permission to settle permanently in Brazil. The prince returned to Rio de Janeiro in early 1844.

== Wedding ==
Louis and Januária were married on April 28, 1844, in a ceremony surrounded by great pomp. The prince left early on Sunday to meet his bride and the emperors at the São Cristóvão Palace. From there, a large procession followed to the Imperial Palace. They passed through streets full of people, colorful with flowers and quilts on balconies. At the Palace, with the court assembled and the arrival of the diplomatic corps and ministers, they proceeded to the Church of Our Lady of Mount Carmel of the Old Sé, where the wedding took place. After the ceremony, there was a reception at the Palace, a military parade, and a dinner.

The emperor made the City Palace available to the newlyweds as a residence, which now became the official residence of the Imperial Princess of Brazil and the Count of Aquila.

== Life in Brazil ==
Already married and in Brazil, the prince did not pay due attention to the content of the conspicuous marriage pact, because, after the wedding, he longed to leave Brazil. Article 11 of the convention bound him to Brazil, and the reaction of the new Imperial Prince, upon learning of the restriction, was utterly childish. Dom Pedro II could not yield until at least his first child saw the light of day, and the Count of Aquila, at 19 years of age, did not seem willing to exchange his European residence for the then monotonous environment of Rio de Janeiro.

The prince was unaware of the customs of the Brazilian court and spent time at the Imperial Farm of Santa Cruz, where he would ride on horseback in the company of the emperor and Dona Januária, even climbing as far as Corcovado. The young officer was made an Honorary Admiral of the Imperial Navy and received all the decorations of the Empire. He wrote to Naples, describing how the people of Rio had received him, acclaiming him with enthusiasm, and that the press had showered him with praise.

== Kingdom of Upper Peru ==
While still residing in Brazil, the prince received several offers to ascend to the throne from some of the unstable Hispanic-American republics, interested in establishing diplomatic ties with the Empire of Brazil and in seeing a Bourbon once again at the head of a State. Louis refused all these offers and later declared: “I am so far from aspiring to supreme power that I have declined it several times while still in Brazil, despite several American republics offering me the position of king. I respect the crown on the heads of others, but I would detest it on myself.”

Lieutenant Colonel Baron of Mascarenhas made him the exciting offer to the Crown of a future "Kingdom of Upper Peru." In reality, it was hoped that Dom Pedro II's brother-in-law would be able to obtain a license for the British-Bolivian to operate freely on the Amazon. The Prince ironically refused the offer.

== Return to Europe ==
Louis and Januária disembarked in Brest, France, where the local mayor awaited them. They soon proceeded to Paris, where they were received by King Louis Philippe, Queen Maria Amélia, and other members of the French royal family, including his sister-in-law, Dona Francisca. After a few days, they continued on to Naples. A ship would take them from Marseille to the capital of the Kingdom. In Naples, the couple was received with great festivities. They stayed for a period at the Royal Palace.

Her brother, Ferdinand II, reserved for her the Palace of Santa Lucia, called Palazzo Campofranco, in the center of Naples. In the first few days, they received many visits from relatives and friends who wished to meet his wife. Shortly after their arrival, on July 18, 1845, the couple's first child, Prince Louis, was born, with King Ferdinand II as his godfather.

The prince receives a pension of 60,000 ducats a year. From the Palazzo Campofranco he carries out his appointed post as commander-in-chief of the Royal Navy of the Kingdom of the Two Sicilies, with the rank of vice-admiral. He was considered the head of the liberal current present among the members of the Neapolitan court, along with his brother, the Count of Trapani.

More than a year after the birth of their first child, on July 22, 1846, Princess Maria Isabella Leopoldine was born, followed a year later by Prince Philip on August 12, 1847. On September 11, 1848, Dona Januária gave birth to twins, the prince dying at birth and the princess, christened Germana Maria Therese, dying the following day. On January 24, 1851, the couple's last child, Prince Emanuele Sebastian Gabriel, was born, with Infante Dom Sebastião as his godfather, but he survived only two days.

In 1857, the Count of Aquila acquired Villa Rosebery from the Serra di Gerace heirs, located in the Gulf of Naples near Possilipo, which boasts one of the most beautiful views in the region. At the villa, the prince continued to expand the park with rare plants and built a small harbor. He named the villa "Brasiliana" in honor of his wife, Dona Januária. Currently, the villa serves as one of the official residences of the President of the Italian Republic.

While Dona Januária was occupied with her children, the Count of Aquila dedicated himself not only to the Navy, but also to the restoration of old churches, charitable works, and painting.

== Viceroy of Sicily ==
In January 1848, a revolution broke out in Palermo, and the independence of Sicily was proclaimed by the rebels. The king then sent the Count of Aquila to restore order on the island, placing him in charge of a fleet of steamships and a troop of 5,000 men, with the mission of bombarding the rebel cities.

The intervention of the consuls of the great powers prevents him from fulfilling the mission entrusted to him, and he ends up returning to Naples to inform the king of the unfolding events. Disconcerted by what has just happened, Ferdinand II decides to change his policy, and on the advice of British diplomacy, he granted Sicily broad autonomy, formally appointing Louis as Viceroy of the island through the decrees of January 18 and 19, 1848.

The Sicilian revolutionaries rejected the sovereign's proposals, and the promotion of the Count of Aquila to viceroy never materialized. After several months of uncertainty, the Sicilian revolution was suppressed by the army.

== Exile ==
In Italy, the 1850s were marked by the Risorgimento, and the Kingdom of the Two Sicilies was severely affected by the development of nationalist ideas.

The year 1859 was very sad for the Counts of Aquila, as on February 14 their daughter, Maria Isabella Leopoldine, died at the age of 13 from typhoid fever. A few months later, on May 22, King Ferdinand II died, then 49 years old. It was another irreparable loss, and from that moment on the kingdom was doomed to end, as was the prestige of the Count of Aquila.

With the death of King Ferdinand II and the launch of the Expedition of the Thousand by Giuseppe Garibaldi, the country threatened to collapse. The new sovereign, Francis II, proved weak in governing the kingdom and refused to listen to the advice of his uncles. Count Aquila, not hiding his disagreement with his nephew's government—which he considers too weak against Garibaldi—has his loyalty questioned by the king, who suspects his uncle of wanting to seize power and proclaim himself regent, as had been the idea in Brazil years before.

Francis II then ordered the departure of the Count of Aquila and his family from the kingdom on August 17, 1860. They had hoped to go into exile in Brazil, but decided to go to London instead. They landed in Marseille and chose to stay in Paris, where they settled on the Avenue de l'Imperatrice. Emperor Napoleon III did not create any difficulty and declared them welcome.

From exile, the Count of Aquila and his family learned of the annexation of southern Italy by the House of Savoy. Despite reconciliation with Emperor Pedro II of Brazil, they never returned to the country of Princess Januária.

== Last years ==
After the exile, the d’Aquila family went to live in France. Their eldest son, Louis, was suggested to marry Dona Isabel, daughter and heiress of Emperor Pedro II of Brazil. He perfectly suited the unique trends and feelings of Brazilians, since his mother, Dona Januária, was Brazilian. But the emperor did not intend to unite the eldest son of the former imperial princess with either of his two daughters.

After the fall of the Spanish monarchy, they ceded their Parisian palace for a few months to their nephew, Prince Gaetan, Count of Girgenti, son-in-law of the former Queen of Spain, Isabella II.

The family decided to move to London, where, in 1872, the meeting with Pedro II, Teresa Cristina and Francisca finally took place. During this meeting, they visited Queen Victoria at Windsor Castle.

Louis enjoyed luxury and superfluity, and never valued money. Even with his family dethroned and exiled, he lived in considerable luxury. He spent what he did not possess; his furniture and belongings were publicly seized when they lived in London, being literally auctioned off. With their family resources exhausted, the family began to live in a state of great penury. They were saved by D. Pedro II and the widowed Empress, D. Amélia, who helped them, giving them money and saving the family's reputation. Faced with these problems, the couple sent their second son, Philip, to Brazil, where he would be educated by D. Pedro II.

The Count of Aquila again got into trouble when he became involved in a debt and asset seizure problem, which was widely publicized and also had a negative impact in Brazil.

The family returned to France, and, after the proclamation of the republic in Brazil, the imperial family joined them in the same country. There, in 1891, Emperor Pedro II died. The Count of Aquila and their children attended the state funeral of the last emperor of Brazil.

Count Aquila died in Paris on March 5, 1897. He is buried in the Bourbon-Aquila Tomb in Père Lachaise Cemetery.

== Legacy ==
Louis was a man of many interests, including naturalists: he sponsored the eminent botanist Guglielmo Gasparrini and was the first to bring two electric eels, or "electric fish", from Brazil to Naples, used at the time for experiments with electricity.

One of his passions, since childhood, was painting, having received, from early childhood, lessons from the famous Neapolitan painter Gabriele Smargiassi, who specialized in painting seascapes, a subject in which Louis also specialized. This talent would be of paramount importance in his future life, as he would win prizes at the Paris Salon, in addition to being mentioned in the famous Benezit encyclopedia.

During his years of exile, he devoted himself assiduously to painting, under the influence of French landscape painters, and exhibited his highly appreciated paintings in many exhibitions, and especially in the great exhibition of 1878. Some of his works are now on display in the homes of his families. One of his paintings, entitled "The Storm", which depicts fishermen helping victims of a storm, is still on display at the Imperial Museum of Petrópolis, in Brazil.

== Descendants ==
Louis and Januária had four children:

- Prince Luigi, Count of Roccaguglielma (18 July 1845 – 27 November 1909). Luigi married morganatically Maria Amelia Bellow-Hamel and had two children: Maria Gennara (born 1870) and Luigi (1873 - 1940).
- Princess Maria Isabella Leopoldine of Bourbon-Two Sicilies (22 July 1846 – 14 February 1859)
- Prince Philip, Count of Espina (12 August 1847 – 9 July 1922). Filippo married morganatically Flora Boonen and had no children.
- Princess Germana Maria Therese of Bourbon-Two Sicilies (11 September 1848 — 12 September 1848)
- Prince Stillbirth of Bourbon-Two Sicilies (11 September 1848 — 11 September 1848)
- Prince Emanuele Sebastian Gabriel of Bourbon-Two Sicilies (24 January 1851 – 26 January 1851).

== Titles and honours ==
=== Titles ===
- 19 June 1824 – 19 September 1824: His Royal Highness Prince Louis of the Two Sicilies
- 19 September 1824 – 28 April 1844: His Royal Highness the Count of Aquila
- 28 April 1844 – 23 February 1845: His Imperial and Royal Highness the Prince Imperial Consort of Brazil
- 23 February 1845 – 5 March 1897: His Imperial and Royal Highness the Count of Aquila

=== Honours ===
- Two Sicilies:
  - Knight of St. Januarius
  - Grand Cross of St. Ferdinand and Merit
  - Grand Cross of the Constantinian Order of Saint George
- Empire of Brazil:
  - Grand Cross of the Imperial Order of Christ
  - Grand Cross of the Imperial Order of Aviz
  - Grand Cross of the Imperial Order of the Sword
  - Grand Cross of the Imperial Order of the Cruzeiro
  - Grand Cross of the Imperial Order of Pedro I
  - Grand Cross of the Imperial Order of the Rosa
- Spain:
  - Grand Cross of the Order of Charles III, 20 March 1830
  - Knight of the Golden Fleece, 30 March 1830
- Duchy of Parma: Grand Cross of St. Louis for Civil Merit, 10 August 1851
- Austrian Empire: Grand Cross of St. Stephen, 1851
- Kingdom of Portugal: Grand Cross of the Tower and Sword

== Ancestry ==
Ancestors of Prince Luigi, Count of Aquila

8. Charles III of Spain (= 12)
4. Ferdinand I of the Two Sicilies
9. Maria Amalia of Saxony (= 13)
2. Francis I of the Two Sicilies
10. Francis I, Holy Roman Emperor
5. Maria Carolina of Austria
11. Maria Theresa of Austria
1. Prince Louis, Count of Aquila
12. Charles III of Spain (= 8)
6. Charles IV of Spain
13. Maria Amalia of Saxony (= 9)
3. Maria Isabella of Spain
14. Philip, Duke of Parma
7. Maria Luisa of Parma
15. Louise Élisabeth of France
