= Afonso, Prince Imperial of Brazil =

Heir apparent to the Brazilian throne (1845–1847)

Afonso
- Prince Imperial of Brazil
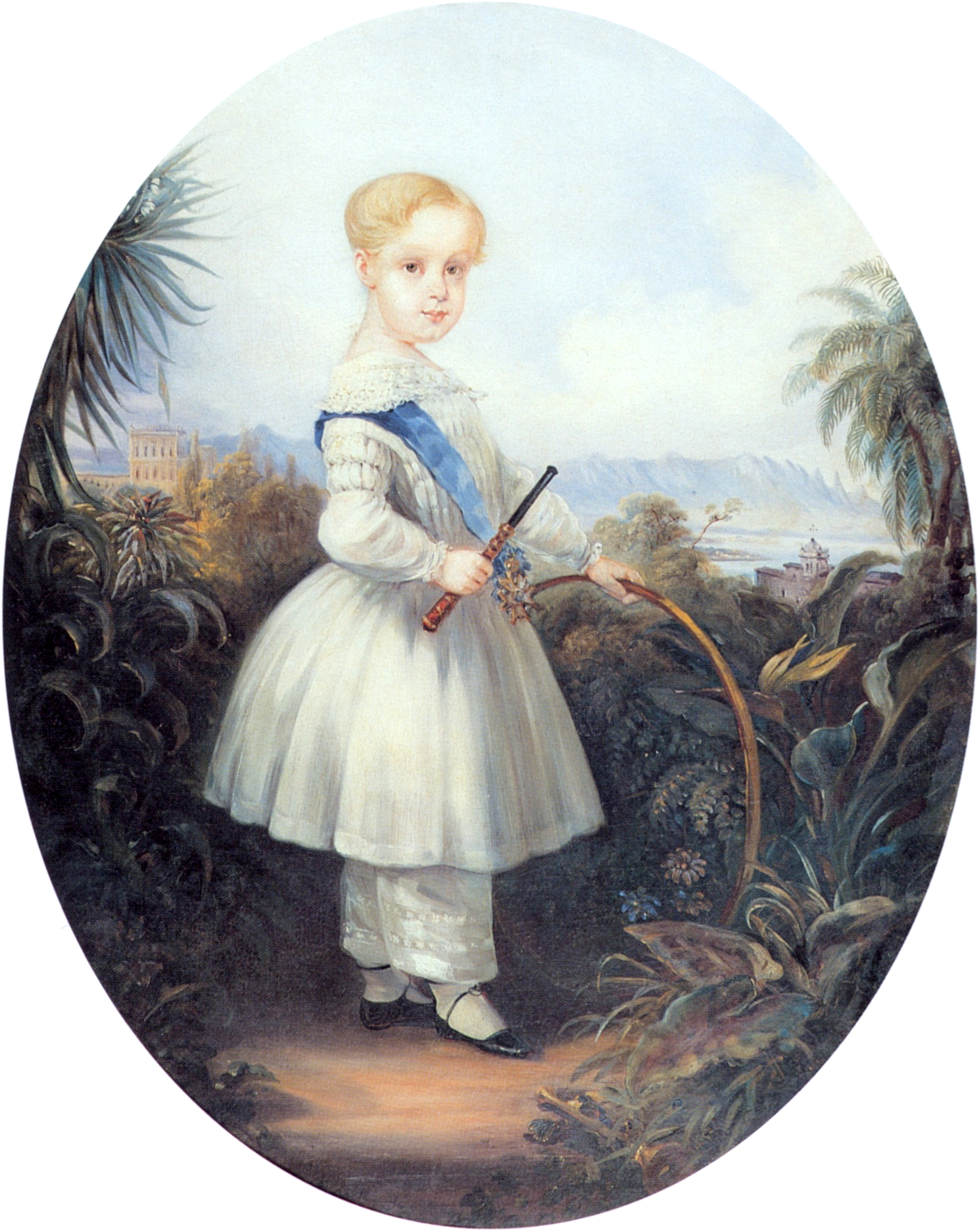
- Afonso at age 2 wearing the blue band of the Order of the Southern Cross, 1846
- Born: 23 February 1845; Palace of São Cristóvão, Rio de Janeiro, Empire of Brazil
- Died: 11 June 1847 (2 years 3 months); Palace of São Cristóvão, Rio de Janeiro, Empire of Brazil
- Burial: Convento de Santo Antônio (Convent of Saint Anthony), Rio de Janeiro
- Afonso Pedro de Alcântara Cristiano Leopoldo Filipe Eugênio Miguel Gabriel Rafael Gonzaga
- House: Braganza
- Father: Pedro II of Brazil
- Mother: Teresa Cristina of the Two Sicilies
- Religion: Roman Catholicism

Dom Afonso (23 February 1845 – 11 June 1847) was the Prince Imperial and heir apparent to the throne of the Empire of Brazil. Born in Rio de Janeiro, he was the eldest child of Emperor Dom Pedro II and Dona Teresa Cristina of the Two Sicilies, and thus a member of the Brazilian branch of the House of Braganza.

Afonso died from epilepsy at the age of two, devastating the emperor. The following year, Pedro and Teresa Cristina had another son, Pedro Afonso, but he too died in infancy. After the loss of his second son, doubts grew in Pedro II's mind that the imperial system could be viable. He still had an heir in his daughter Isabel, but he was unconvinced that a female would prove to be a suitable successor. He showed less concern about the effects his policies had on the monarchy, provided his daughter Isabel with no training for her role as potential empress, and failed to cultivate her acceptance within the country's political class. Pedro II's lack of interest in protecting the imperial system ultimately led to its downfall.

== Birth ==
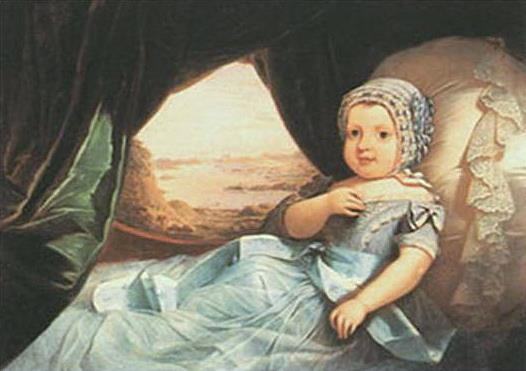
A painting of Prince Afonso, c. 1845

Afonso was born at 13:35 on 23 February 1845 in the Palace of São Cristóvão, in Rio de Janeiro, Brazil. He was named after his ancestor Afonso, Duke of Braganza, son of King João I of Portugal and founder of the House of Braganza (Portuguese: Bragança). His full name was Afonso Pedro de Alcântara Cristiano Leopoldo Filipe Eugênio Miguel Gabriel Rafael Gonzaga. Through his father, Emperor Pedro II, he was a member of the Brazilian branch of the House of Braganza (Portuguese: Bragança) and was referred to using the honorific "Dom" (Lord) from birth. Afonso was the grandson of Emperor Pedro I of Brazil and nephew of Queen Maria II of Portugal. Through his mother, Teresa Cristina, he was a grandson of Francis I and nephew to Ferdinand II, who ruled as kings of the Two Sicilies in turn.

The U.S. minister in Brazil reported that his birth was heralded "by rockets and artillery, and was followed by a grand fête day at court... and by illuminations and displays of various sorts and public rejoicings". As was customary within the House of Braganza, Afonso's birth was a formal event attended by the imperial court. Pedro II immediately presented the newborn baby to the throng gathered in the palace, announcing "Gentlemen, it is a prince whom God ..."—here he was overcome with emotion and was unable to continue. The birth of a much needed male heir—thus regarded by contemporaries—was met with joy throughout the empire. Luís Alves de Lima e Silva (then Baron and later Duke of Caxias) wrote to his father: "No one was happier than I with the news [of the prince's birth]".

== Life and impact ==
The birth of an heir produced changes in Pedro II's character. Previously isolated and shy, he became more outgoing and confident as monarch. His strained relationship with his wife, the product of a disappointing arranged marriage, also improved, and with children came shared domestic interests that developed into an affectionate friendship.

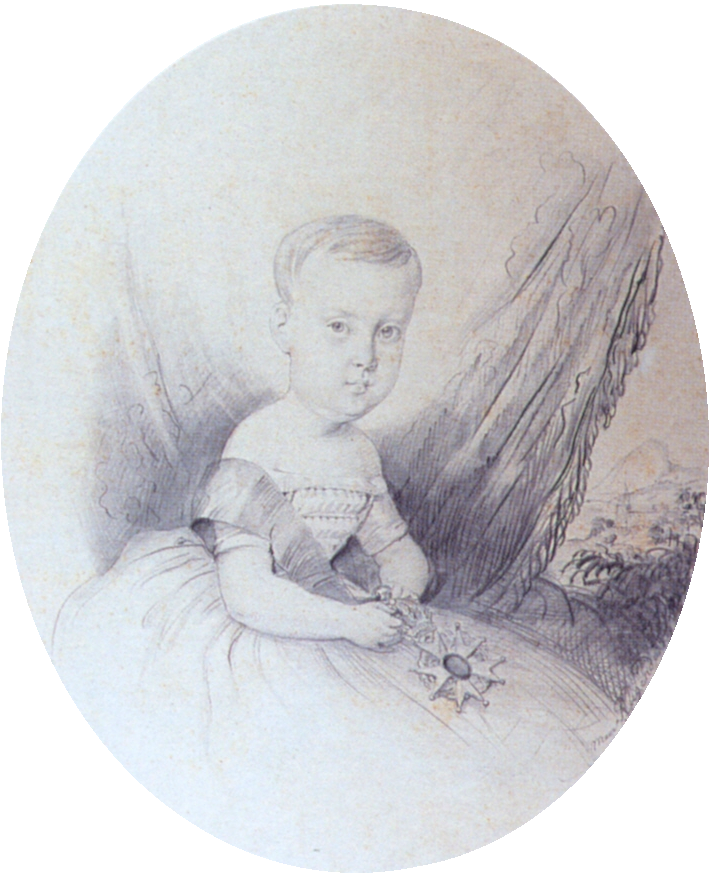
A sketch of an unbreeched Prince Afonso, 1845

Afonso was healthy, and as the eldest son of Pedro II, was heir to the throne and styled "Prince Imperial". The young prince resembled his father, particularly in his face, hair and eyes. Because of his gender and position as heir apparent, he became the center of attention, particularly for Pedro II. A letter written by Pedro II to his elder sister Maria II a few months after the birth of his second child—a daughter named Isabel—displayed his happiness: "No news here save the good state of health of myself, of the empress, and of the little ones, who are becoming increasingly cute, principally little Afonso, who is already walking and who says many words, still half incomprehensible, the which increases their charm."

== Death ==
On 11 June 1847, the young prince was playing in the library of the palace when he experienced a series of strong convulsions; his wet nurse found him and she took him to his bed, where he died, not quite two and a half years old. His death revealed that Afonso had epilepsy, as did his father. The grief of Pedro II and his wife was enormous. It was feared that the shock might affect Teresa Cristina's health, as she was pregnant at the time with her third child. She later gave birth without complications on 13 July to a girl, who was christened Leopoldina. The devastated emperor wrote a letter to his stepmother, the Empress Amélie, dated 11 July 1847, telling her of Afonso's death: "With the most piercing grief I tell you that my little Afonso, your godson, unfortunately died of convulsions, which he suffered during five hours on the 4th of last month; (Note: Pedro II was mistaken about the date of his son's death. It did in fact occur on 11 June (Barman 2002, p. 252).) and a few days ago little Isabel was put at risk by a strong attack of convulsions that greatly frightened me."

A grand state funeral—not seen since the death of Pedro II's sister Paula in 1833—was held for the Prince Imperial at 7 p.m. three days after his death. He was buried in the Convento da Ajuda (Convent of Aid) in Rio de Janeiro. When the convent was demolished in 1911 his remains were moved to the mausoleum of the Convento de Santo Antônio (Convent of Saint Anthony) in Rio de Janeiro, where other members of the Brazilian House of Braganza (including his younger brother Pedro, his uncle João and his aunt Paula) are also located.

== Legacy ==
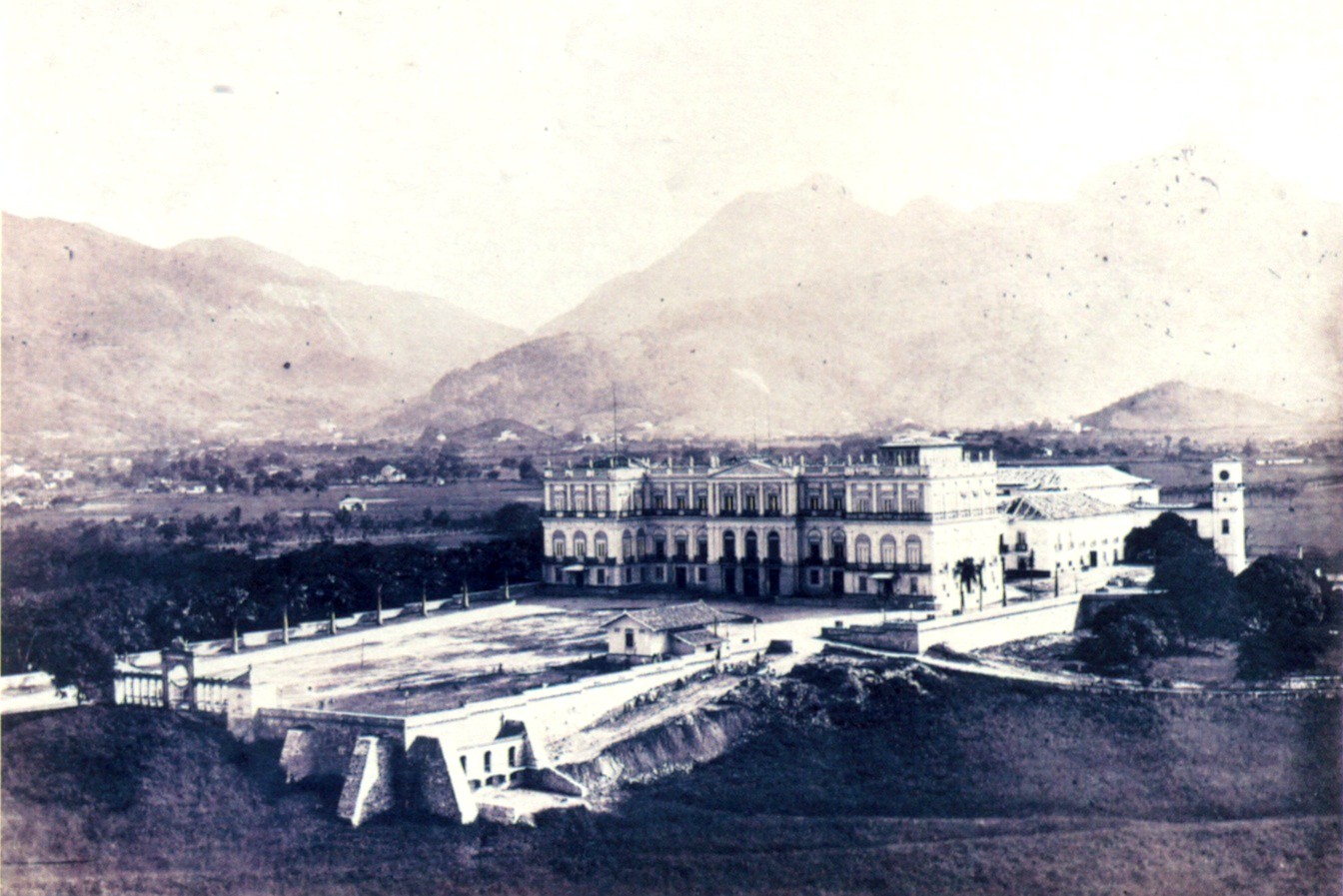
The Palace of São Cristóvão where Afonso lived. Photograph taken about 15 years after his death.

The prince's early death (and the later demise of his younger brother) had an enormous impact on Pedro II: on a personal level, on his future conduct as monarch, and on the empire. In his eyes, the deaths of his only sons seemed to presage the end of the imperial system. Although the emperor still had a legal successor in his daughter Isabel, in the male-dominated society of the time he had little confidence that a woman could rule Brazil. He was fond and respectful of the women in his life, but he did not consider it feasible that Isabel could survive as monarch. He did nothing to prepare Isabel for the responsibilities of ascending the throne, nor did he attempt to encourage acceptance of a female ruler among the political class.

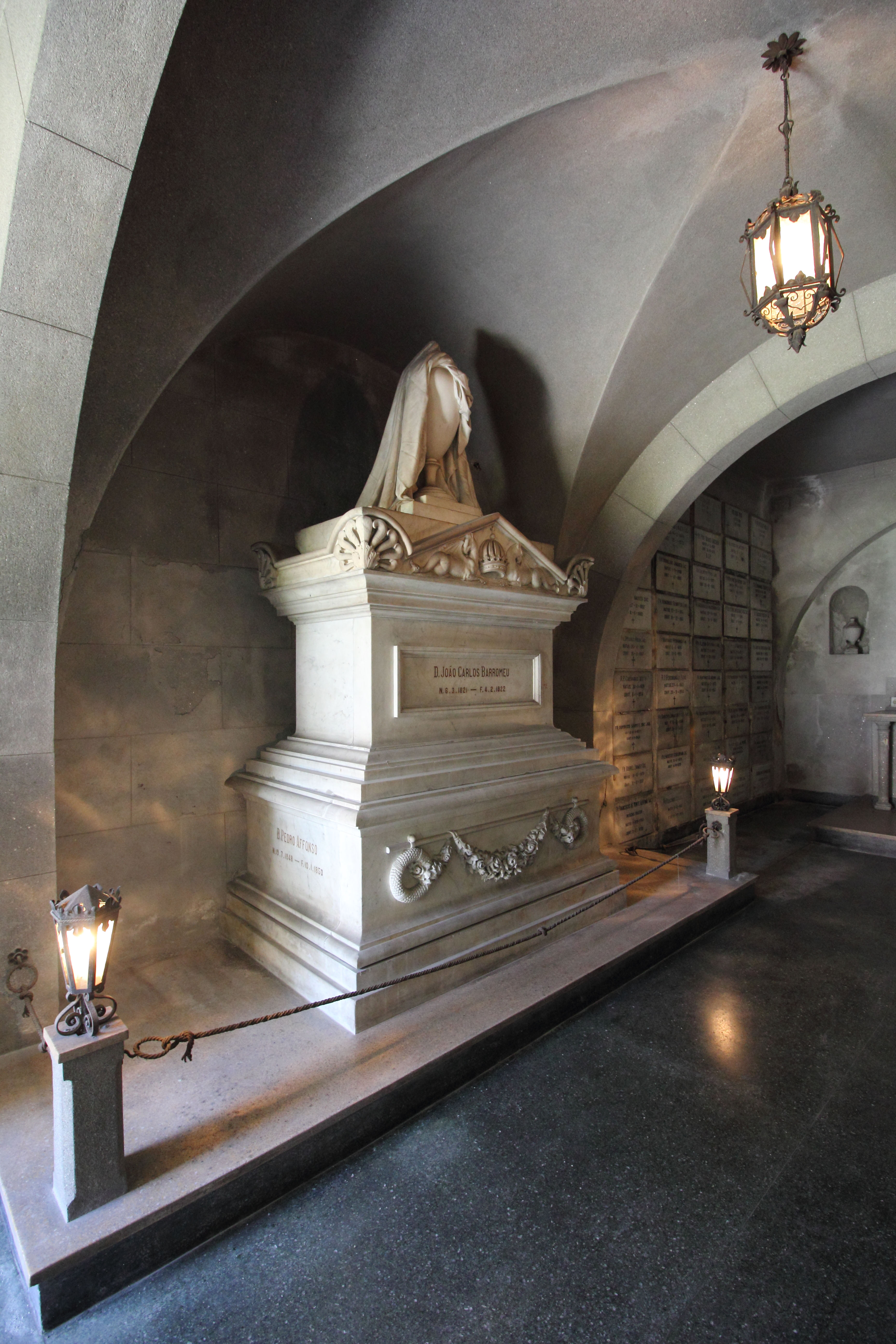
The grave of princes Afonso, João Carlos, and Pedro Afonso in the Convent of Saint Anthony in Rio de Janeiro.

Pedro II began his rule as a figurehead who held together a realm on the verge of disintegration. He quickly matured and successfully navigated the empire through repeated and serious crises. By the time of Afonso's death, the nation was entering an unprecedented era of prosperity, development and tranquility. Even as the emperor's political successes and policies began to bear fruit, the lack of a male heir caused him to lose motivation to promote the imperial office as a position to be carried on by his descendants. The emperor turned away from personal and family ties, and focused on upholding the constitution while directing Brazil toward policies that furthered modernization and social advancement. The future of the monarchy as an institution no longer mattered to him, and in 1889, he was deposed in a coup, marking the end of the Empire of Brazil.

== Titles, styles and honors ==
Styles of Afonso, Prince Imperial
- Reference style: His Imperial Highness
- Spoken style: Your Imperial Highness

=== Titles and styles ===
- 23 February 1845 – 11 June 1847: His Imperial Highness The Prince Imperial

The prince's full style and title was "His Imperial Highness Dom Afonso, Prince Imperial of Brazil".

=== Appointments ===
- Honorary President of the Brazilian Historic and Geographic Institute.

=== Honors ===
Prince Afonso was a recipient of the following Brazilian Orders:

- Major Commander of the Order of Christ
- Major Commander of the Order of Saint Benedict of Aviz
- Major Commander of the Order of Saint James of the Sword
- Grand Cross of the Order of Pedro I
- Grand Cross and Grand Major Dignitary of the Order of the Rose

== Ancestry ==
Ancestors of Afonso, Prince Imperial of Brazil

8. John VI of Portugal and Brazil
4. Pedro I of Brazil and IV of Portugal
9. Carlota Joaquina of Spain
2. Pedro II of Brazil
10. Francis II, Holy Roman Emperor
5. Maria Leopoldina of Austria
11. Maria Theresa of Naples and Sicily
1. Afonso, Prince Imperial of Brazil
12. Ferdinand I of the Two Sicilies
6. Francis I of the Two Sicilies
13. Maria Carolina of Austria
3. Teresa Cristina of the Two Sicilies
14. Charles IV of Spain
7. Maria Isabella of Spain
15. Maria Luisa of Parma

== Footnotes ==
Afonso, Prince Imperial of Brazil House of Bragança Cadet branch of the House of Aviz Born: 23 February 1845 Died: 11 June 1847
Brazilian royalty
Preceded by Princess Januária Maria	Prince Imperial of Brazil; 23 February 1845 – 11 June 1847	Succeeded by Princess Isabel
