= Villa Rosebery =

Coordinates: 40.8006°N 14.205°E

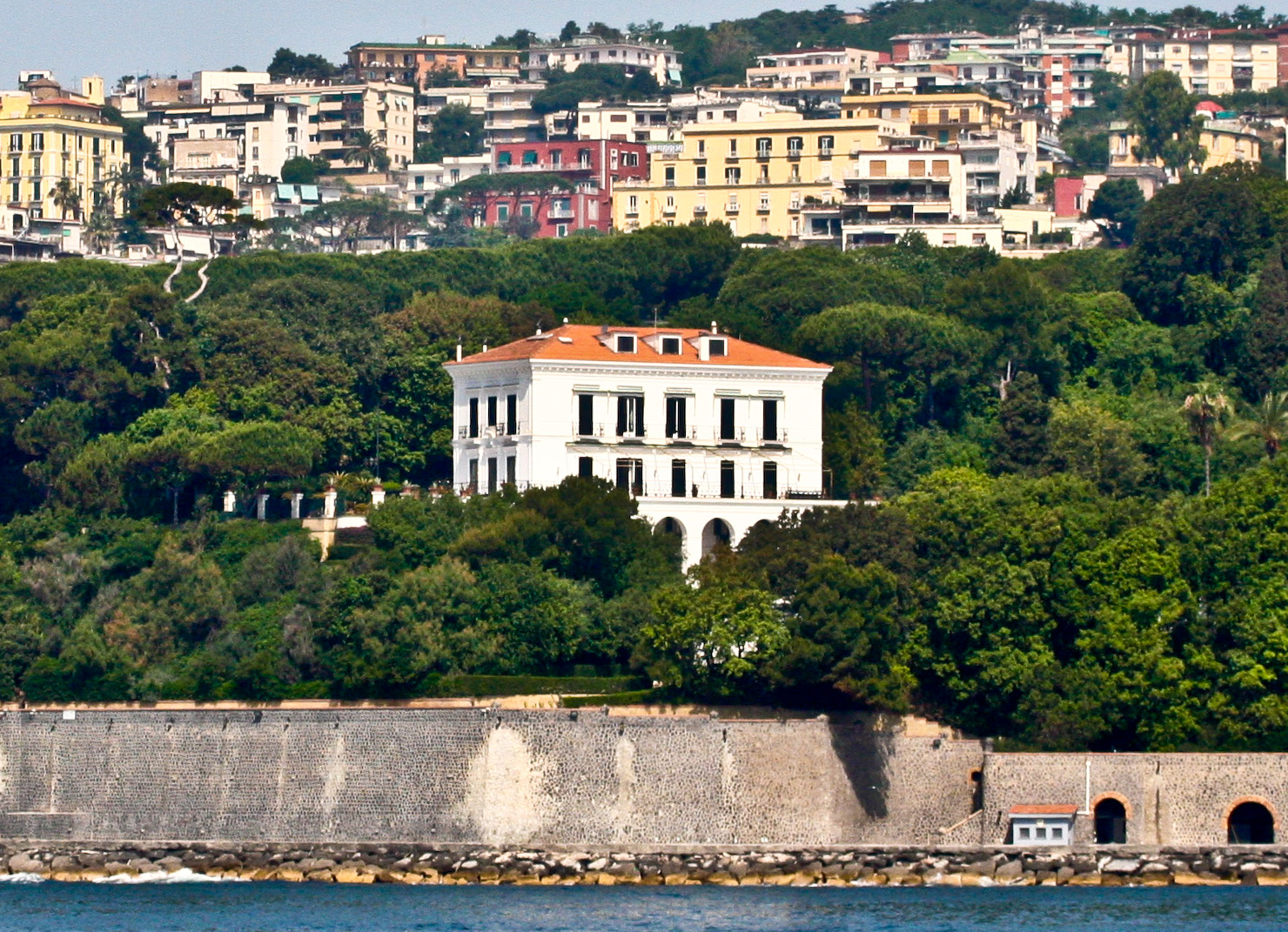
- Interactive map of the Villa Rosebery area

General information
- Status: Completed
- Type: Official residence
- Architectural style: Neo-classical
- Location: Naples, Italy
- Current tenants: President of Italy
- Named for: 5th Earl of Rosebery
- Owner: Italian State

Design and construction
- Architects: Stefano Gasse; Luigi Gasse

The Villa Rosebery is one of the three official residences of the President of Italy (the other two being the Quirinal Palace in Rome and the Castelporziano country retreat outside Rome). It is located in Naples and its area covers 6.6 hectares (16.3 acres).

The villa is named after its former owner, Archibald Primrose, 5th Earl of Rosebery, who served as British prime minister in 1894–1895 for the Liberal Party.

== History ==
The villa was originally built as a cottage in the grounds of the Belvedere (now the Palazzina Borbonica) in 1801 by Count Thurn, an Austrian officer in the service of the King of Naples. The original building was rebuilt under the ownership of Don Agostino Serra Terranova in the mid 19th century as the Casino Gaudiosa, achieving much of its current form. Sold after Don Agostino's death in 1857, the villa came into the ownership of Prince Luigi, Count of Aquila, the commander of the Neapolitan Navy, who renamed the property La Brasiliana in honour of his sister's husband, the emperor Pedro II of Brazil. Following Garibaldi's revolution the villa was sold in 1860 to a businessman, Gustavo Delahente, who in turn sold it to Lord Rosebery, the former Prime Minister of the United Kingdom, in 1897.

In 1909 Lord Rosebery presented the building to the British Government for the use of the British Ambassador to Italy. In 1932 the British Government in turn presented the building to the Italian State and the villa was used as a summer royal residence. In 1934 Princess Maria Pia of Savoy, first child of the Crown Prince (later King Umberto II), was born here and so the villa was renamed "Villa Maria Pia". From June 1944 until his abdication and exile in May 1946, the villa was the residence of King Victor Emmanuel III. From 1946 to 1949 it was used by the Accademia Aeronautica, and after a period of dis-use it became an official residence of the President of the Italian Republic in 1957.
