= Princess Januária of Brazil =

Princess Januária
- Princess Imperial of Brazil; Countess of Aquila
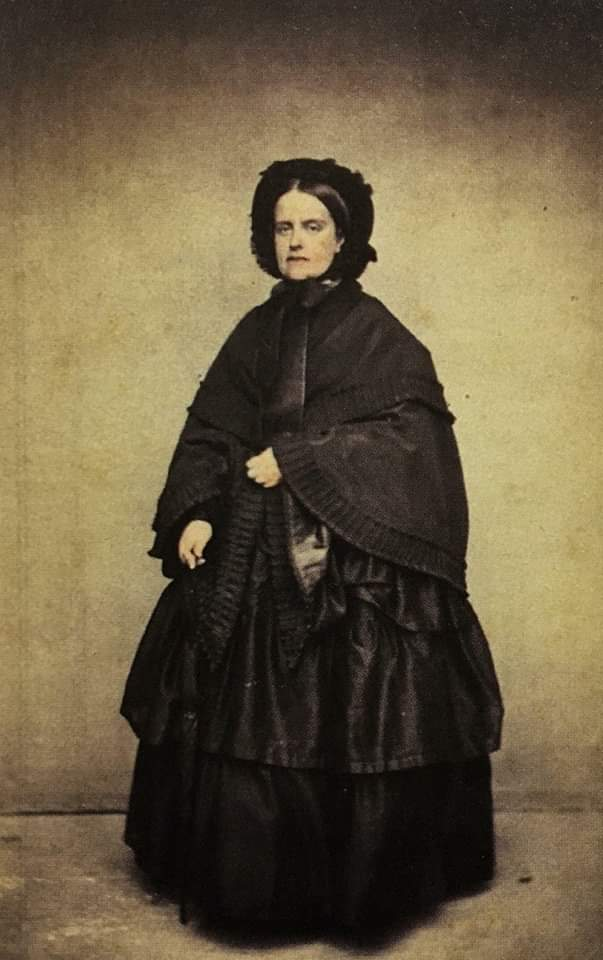
- Princess Januária photographed in 1859
- Born: 11 March 1822; Palace of São Cristóvão, Rio de Janeiro, Kingdom of Brazil
- Died: 13 March 1901 (aged 79); Nice, Provence-Alpes-Côte d'Azur, France
- Spouse: Prince Louis, Count of Aquila (m. 1844; died 1897)
- Issue: Prince Luigi, Count of Roccaguglielma; Princess Maria Isabella; Prince Filippo; Prince Emanuele
Names
- Portuguese: Januária Maria Joana Carlota Leopoldina Cândida Francisca Xavier de Paula Micaela Gabriela Rafaela Gonzaga
- House: Braganza
- Father: Pedro I of Brazil
- Mother: Maria Leopoldina of Austria

Princess Januária of Brazil (Portuguese pronunciation: [ʒɐnuˈaɾiɐ mɐˈɾiɐ]; Januária Maria Joana Carlota Leopoldina Cândida Francisca Xavier de Paula Micaela Gabriela Rafaela Gonzaga; 11 March 1822 – 13 March 1901) was a Brazilian princess and Portuguese infanta (princess). She was the second daughter of Pedro I of Brazil and IV of Portugal and his first wife, Archduchess Maria Leopoldina of Austria.

== Early life ==
Dona Januária was born at the Royal Palace of São Cristóvão in Rio de Janeiro as an Infanta of Portugal during the reign of her grandfather King John VI of Portugal and Brazil. She was the second surviving daughter of Pedro, the Prince Royal of the United Kingdom of Portugal, Brazil and the Algarves and Maria Leopoldina of Austria, Archduchess of Austria after the birth of her older sister, Queen Maria II of Portugal, in 1819.

Princess Januária grew up alongside her siblings Emperor Pedro II, Princess Paula and Princess Francisca. Her name was chosen by her father as a way of honoring the province of Rio de Janeiro. Januária was born only one month after the death of her brother João Carlos, Prince of Beira. She lost her mother at the age of four and saw her father leave for the Kingdom of Portugal with her stepmother and her older sister at nine to fight the Liberal Wars. She grew up under extremely strict education.

In 1833, Princess Paula Mariana died before she was 10 years old. Princess Januaria, through a letter, reported the event to her father:

Beloved, Daddy. Despite our constant supplications to heaven, our dear sister Paula Mariana left. We found no consolation. Our beloved sister is no longer with us. In addition, little Pedro became seriously ill. We came to think that he had caught the same fever as Paula Mariana, but thank heavens he has improved and is already sitting in his study room. To express our gratitude, we, sister Chica and I, your daughter Januária, will not eat sugar until Pedro's birthday, December 2. Dear Dad, we are desperate and in great dismay. You miss us a lot and we also miss our sister Maria da Glória and all those who are with you in Lisbon. With the promise of always being obedient and loving children, Januaria, Francisca and Pedro.

== Princess Imperial of Brazil ==
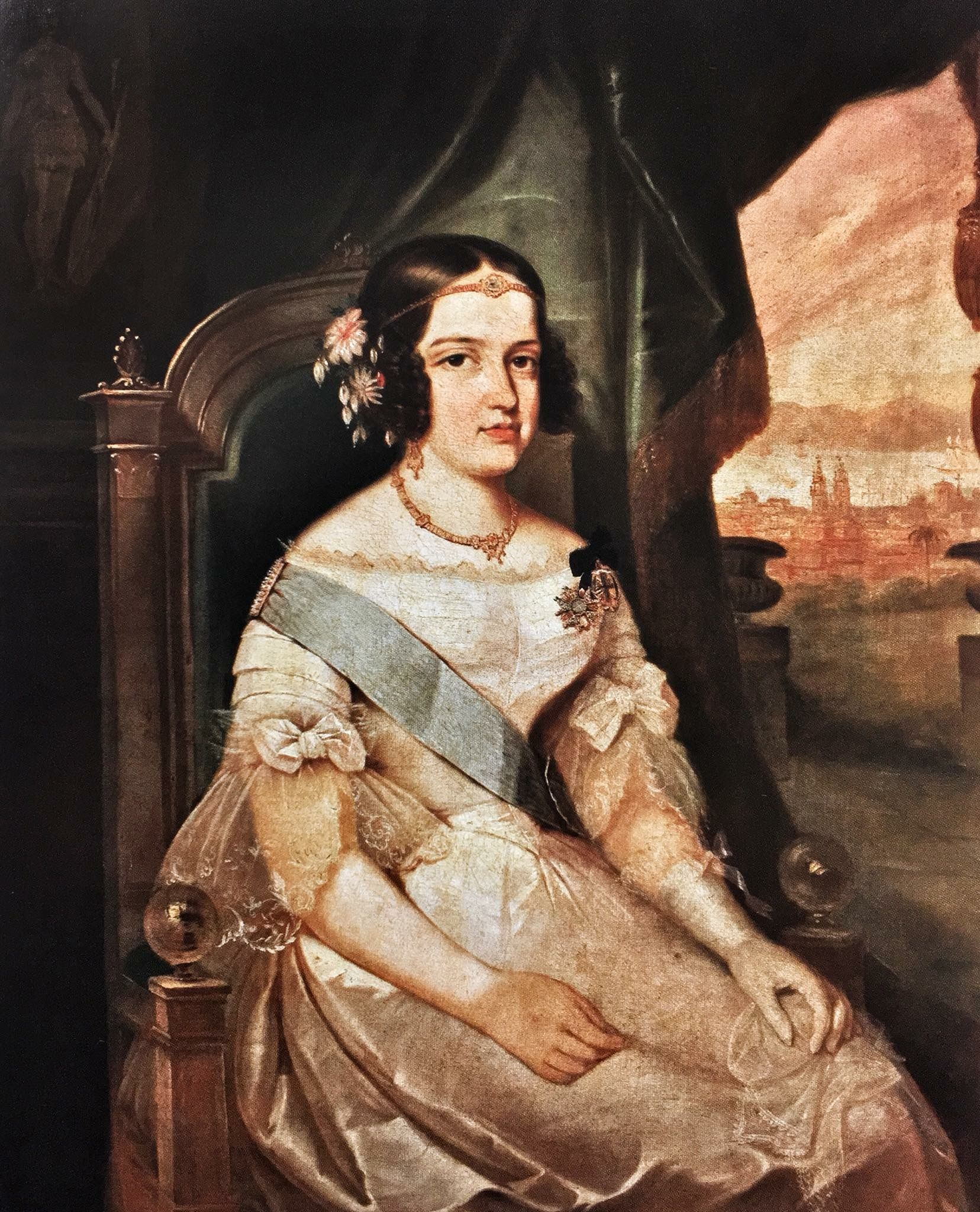
Januária wearing the insignia and sash of the Imperial Order of the Cross, c. 1830–1840

From 1835 until 1845, she held the title Princess Imperial of Brazil, as the heir presumptive of her brother Emperor Pedro II. When her sister Maria was excluded from the Brazilian line of succession by law no. 91 of 30 October 1835, Januária became heir presumptive to the throne of the Empire of Brazil. Her younger brother Pedro II was then a minor, and consideration was given to declaring her regent, though this never materialized.

On August 4, 1836, Januária (then 14 years old) entered the hall of the palace of the Imperial Senate, wearing a rich gold dress on which was distinguished the insignia of the Grand Cross of the Imperial Order of the Cross and, in the presence of the deputies, with her hand on the missal, solemnly declared:

I swear to keep the Catholic, Apostolic, Roman religion; Observe the Political Constitution of the Brazilian Nation and be obedient to the laws and the Emperor.

In this way, she became the Princess Imperial of Brazil (heir to the throne) until the birth of Prince Afonso, son of Pedro II.

== Marriage and issue ==
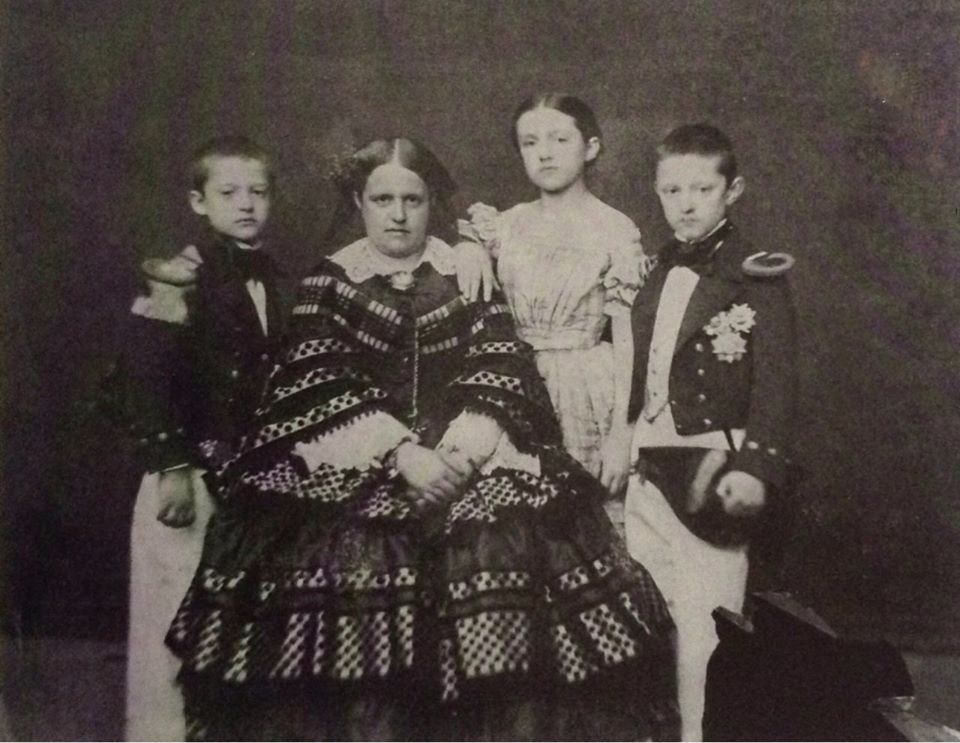
Januária with her children Luigi, Maria Isabella, and Filippo, c. 1850

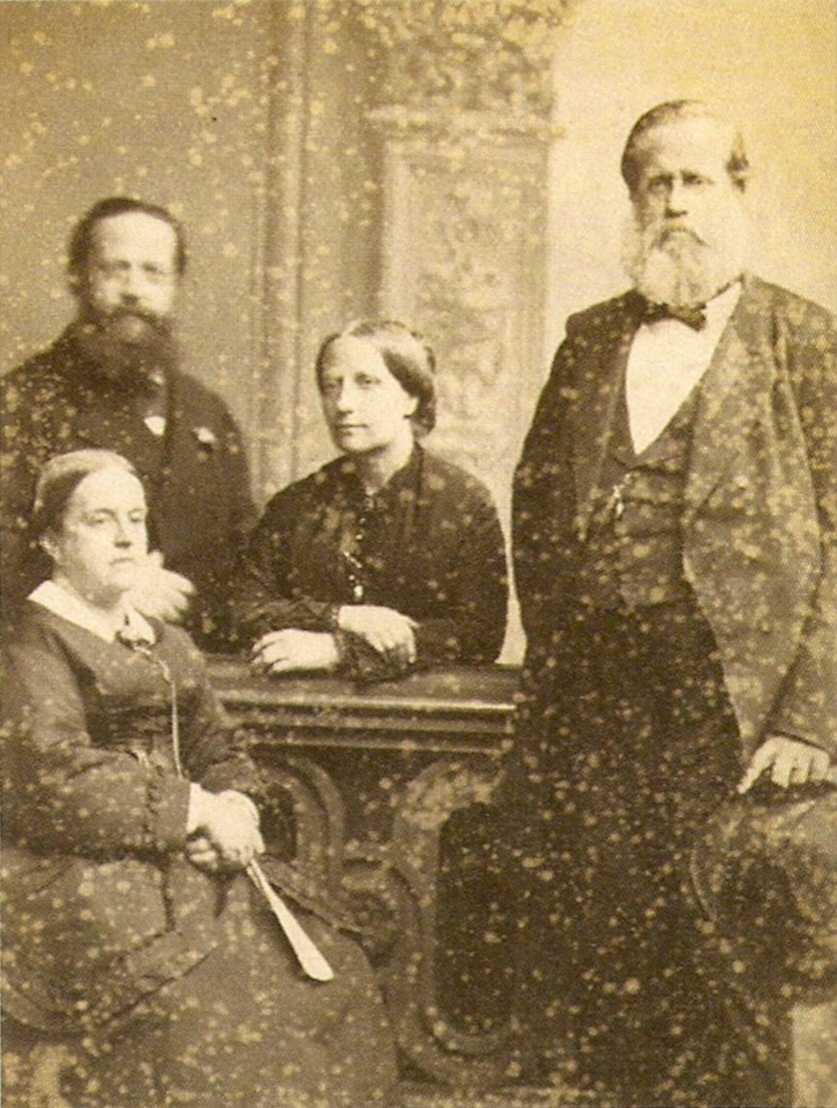
The Count and Countess of Aquila (seated, left) with the Emperor (right) and Empress of Brazil, c. 1871

As only a Brazilian member of the Imperial House could inherit the throne, it became critically important for marriages to be arranged for Januária Maria, Pedro II, and their sister Francisca.

Spouses for both Januária and Pedro II were found in the Kingdom of the Two Sicilies. Her marriage to Prince Louis of the Two Sicilies, Count of Aquila (brother of Pedro II's new wife, Empress Teresa Cristina) was celebrated on 28 April 1844 in Rio de Janeiro, Brazil. Her husband was a son of Francis I of the Two Sicilies and his second wife, María Isabel of Spain. Friction developed between the Count of Aquila and the Emperor, and Januária Maria and Aquila were eventually permitted to leave Brazil in October 1844. In 1845, Januária Maria's position as heir presumptive, and the restrictions it entailed, was lost with the birth of Pedro II's first child, Afonso, Prince Imperial of Brazil.

At the time of their marriage, according to article 2, it was guaranteed that even with the birth of the children of Emperor Dom Pedro II of Brazil the couple would enjoy the honor of being treated by Imperial Highness.

Art. II. As soon as the marriage takes place, His Royal Highness Prince Luiz Carlos Maria, Count of Aquila, husband of Her Imperial Highness the Princess Imperial of Brazil D. Januária Maria, will be considered Prince of the House and the Imperial Family of Brazil, and shall enjoy all the rights and prerogatives that, according to the Constitution of the Empire, belong to such Princes. He will take the title of Imperial Prince, which now belongs to his future Augusta Wife; When, however, His Majesty the Emperor has descendants, the two August Spouses will take the title of Prince and Princess of Brazil, preserving with all the treatment of Imperial Highness.

=== Issue ===
Januária and Louis had six children:

- Prince Luigi, Count of Roccaguglielma (18 July 1845 – 27 November 1909). Luigi married morganatically Maria Amelia Bellow-Hamel and had two children.
- Princess Maria Isabella of the Two Sicilies (22 July 1846 – 14 February 1859)
- Prince Filippo of the Two Sicilies (12 August 1847 – 9 July 1922). Filippo also married morganatically Flora Boonen and had no children.
- Stillborn twins (1848). Buried in Santa Chiara, Naples.
- Prince Emanuele of the Two Sicilies (24 January 1851 – 26 January 1851).

== Death ==
Post-mortem photograph of Princess Januária, 1901

She died in Nice in 1901 being the last daughter of Emperor Pedro I and Empress Maria Leopoldina to die.

== Legacy ==
The city of Januária in Minas Gerais was named in her honor.

== Ancestry ==
Ancestors of Princess Januária of Brazil

8. Peter III of Portugal
4. John VI of Portugal and Brazil
9. Maria I of Portugal and Brazil
2. Pedro I of Brazil and IV of Portugal
10. Charles IV of Spain
5. Carlota Joaquina of Spain
11. Maria Luisa of Parma
1. Princess Januária of Brazil
12. Leopold II, Holy Roman Emperor
6. Francis II, Holy Roman Emperor
13. Maria Luisa of Spain
3. Maria Leopoldina of Austria
14. Ferdinand I of the Two Sicilies
7. Maria Theresa of Naples and Sicily
15. Maria Carolina of Austria

Princess Januária of Brazil House of Braganza Cadet branch of the House of Aviz Born: 11 March 1822 Died: 13 March 1901
Brazilian royalty
Preceded by Maria II of Portugal	Princess Imperial of Brazil; 30 October 1835 – 23 February 1845	Succeeded by Prince Afonso
