= Prince Imperial of Brazil =

Heir to the Brazilian imperial throne

Standard of the Prince Imperial

Original coat of arms of the Prince Imperial

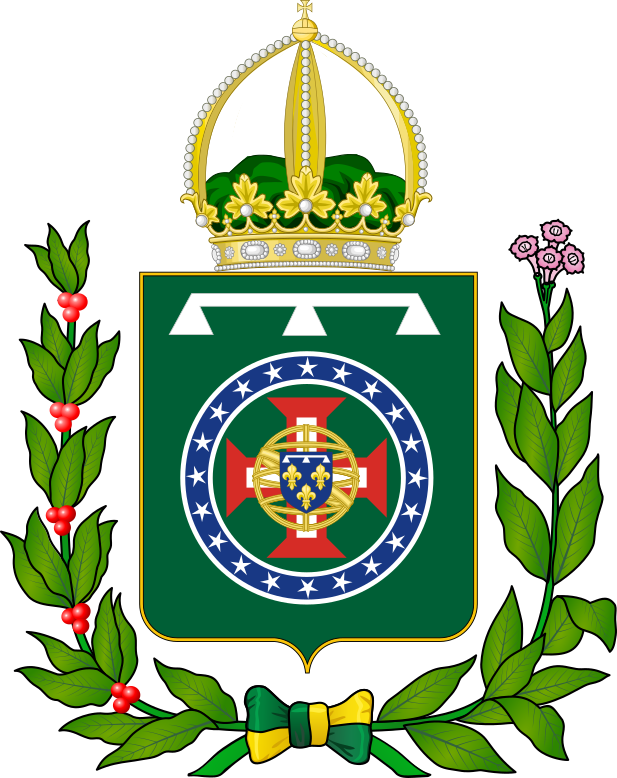
Modern coat of arms of the Prince Imperial, with an inescutcheon in reference to the Orléans-Braganza branch

Prince Imperial (Princess Imperial when the holder is female) is the title created after the proclamation of independence of the Empire of Brazil, in 1822, to designate the heir apparent or the heir presumptive to the Brazilian imperial throne. Even after the proclamation of the Republic in 1889, the title was kept in use by the Brazilian Imperial Family.

== Overview ==
According to article 105 of the Brazilian Constitution of 1824, the title Prince Imperial should be used to designate the first in line to the imperial throne of Brazil. The Constitution also specifies that the eldest son of the Prince Imperial should be designated Prince of Grão-Pará, indicating the second in line of succession.

The last Emperor of Brazil, Pedro II, died in 1891, two years after the abolition of the Brazilian monarchy. His daughter, Isabel, Princess Imperial of Brazil, was the last holder of the title during the existence of the Empire. Since then, the title has been used by the heir to the head of the Brazilian Imperial House.

All the Brazilian princes (the Prince Imperial, the Prince of Grão-Pará and the other princes) were guaranteed a seat in the Senate after they reached the age of 25. However, for various reasons, including premature death and marriage with foreign dynasts, only Isabel actually sat in the Senate, becoming the first Brazilian woman to be a senator.

Finally, according to the Constitution and some later rules created by the Brazilian Imperial House, the princes in the line of succession must marry with members of other dynastic houses in order to keep the égalite de naissance to maintain their imperial titles. A princess who marries the head of another dynastic house would not transmit her Brazilian titles to their offspring, and the princes could not assume a foreign throne and keep their Brazilian titles. These restrictions are aligned to Portuguese and French royal traditions, although the Brazilian rules of succession are not directed by Salic law.

== List of Princes and Princesses Imperial ==
Image	Name	Lifespan	Tenure	Notes
	Princess Maria da Glória	4 April 1819 – 15 November 1853	12 October 1822 – 2 December 1825; 7 April 1831 – 30 October 1835	Heir presumptive from 1822 to 1825, due to the birth of her brother Pedro, and from his ascension until her exclusion from the Brazilian line of succession by law no. 91 of 30 October 1835.
	Prince Pedro de Alcântara	2 December 1825 – 5 December 1891	2 December 1825 – 7 April 1831	Imperial heir from 1825 until his accession to the Brazilian throne in 1831
	Princess Januária	11 March 1822 – 13 March 1901	30 October 1835 – 23 February 1845	Princess Imperial from 1835 to 1845, until the birth of her nephew Afonso
	Prince Afonso	23 February 1845 – 11 June 1847	23 February 1845 – 11 June 1847	Elder son of Emperor Pedro II
	Prince Pedro Afonso	19 July 1848 – 10 January 1850	19 July 1848 – 10 January 1850	Younger son of Emperor Pedro II
	Princess Isabel	29 July 1846 – 14 November 1921	11 June 1847 – 19 July 1848; 9 January 1850 – 15 November 1889	Princess Imperial from the death of her elder brother until the birth of her younger brother, and from his death until the abolition of the monarchy

== See also ==
- Prince of Brazil, the title granted on to the heir to the throne of Portugal
- Prince of Brazil (Brazil), the title granted on to non-heir (with some exceptions) members of the Brazilian Imperial Family
