= Santa Cruz Estate =

Building in Santa Cruz, Rio de Janeiro

Coordinates: 22.9100°S 43.6853°W

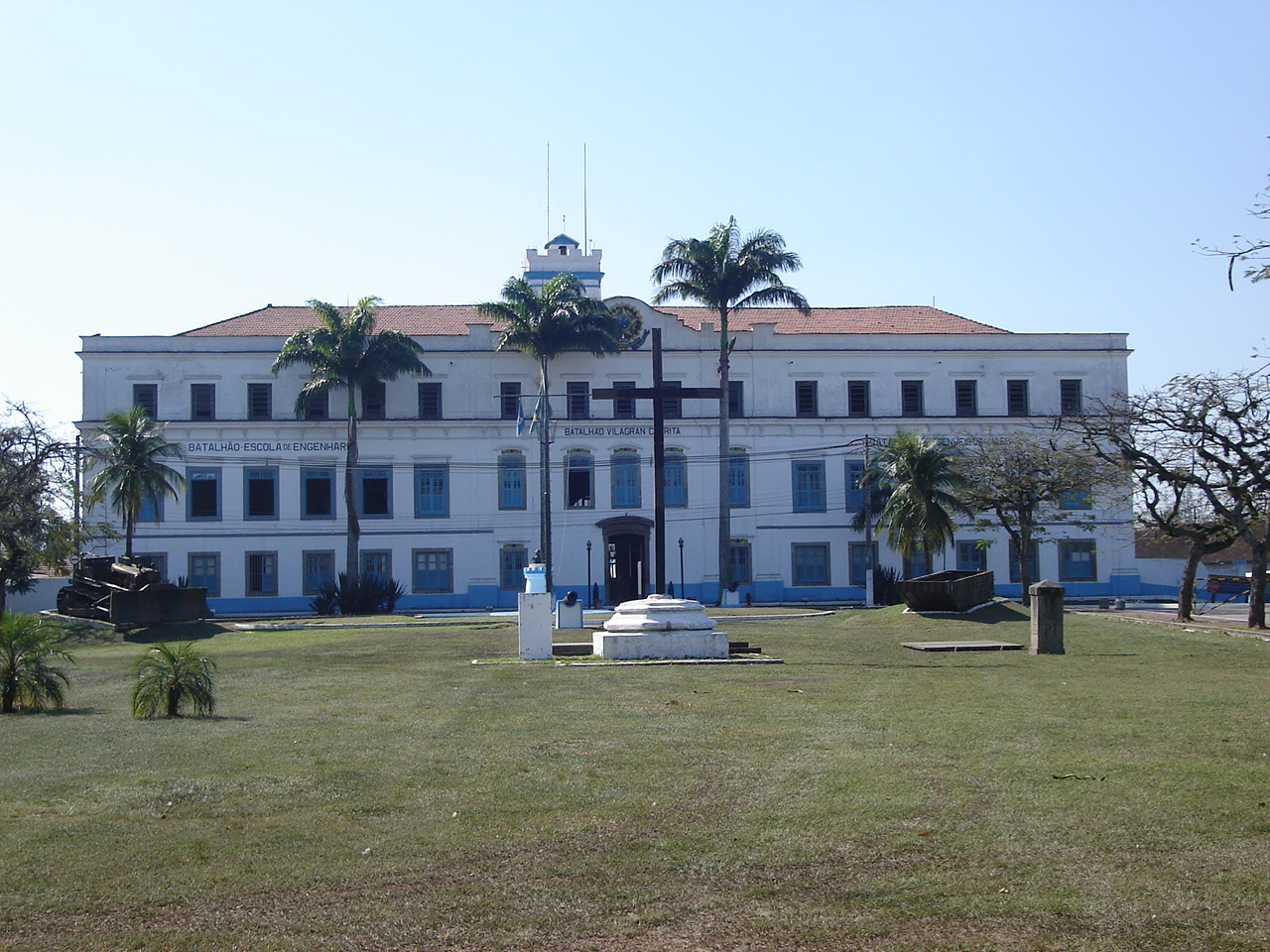
Imperial Palace of Santa Cruz

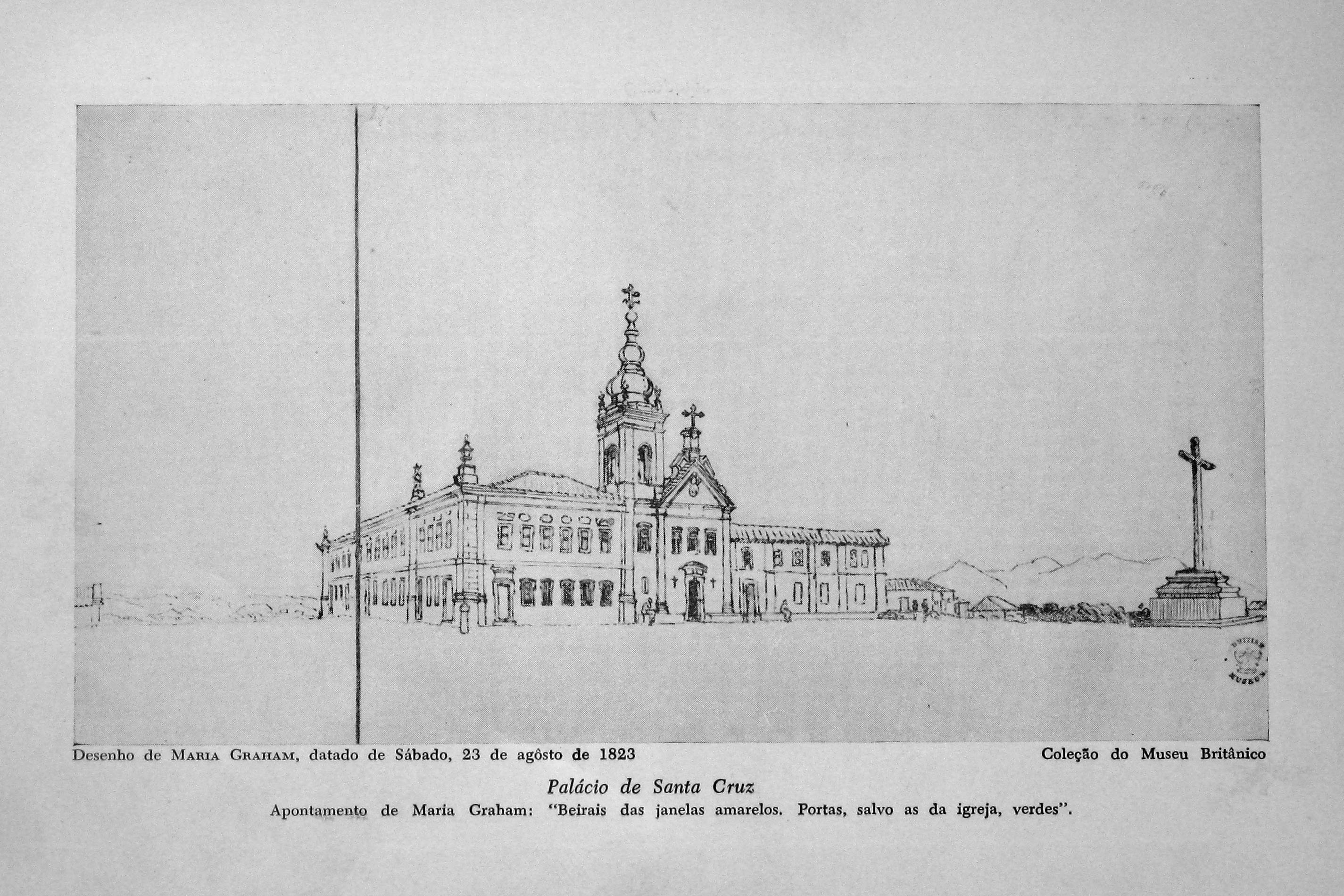
The palace in 1823

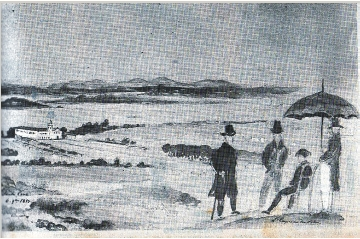
Young Emperor Pedro II enjoying the view of the palace, drawing by Benjamin Mary dated 6 November 1837

The Santa Cruz Estate is a former imperial country retreat in Santa Cruz, Rio de Janeiro. Originally a Jesuit estate and convent dating from 1570, it became a residence of the Portuguese viceroys in Brazil at the end of the 18th century. When King John VI and the royal family moved the court to Brazil in 1808, the palace became a royal residence. After the King's return to Portugal, the Prince Regent Pedro I continued to use the palace. Upon his marriage to Princess Leopoldina in 1818, they spent their honeymoon in the palace. The estate became one of the imperial palaces with the independence of Brazil in 1822. Emperor Pedro II later used the palace as a summer residence.

Following proclamation of a republic in 1889, the palace was converted to a military school. It has continued to function as an academy to the present.
