= João Carlos, Prince of Beira =

Portuguese prince (1821–1822)

João Carlos
- Prince of Beira
- Born: March 6, 1821; Rio de Janeiro, Brazil
- Died: February 4, 1822 (aged 0); Rio de Janeiro, Brazil
Names
- D. João Carlos Pedro Leopoldo Olegário da Encarnação Francisco Xavier de Paula Miguel Gabriel Rafael Gonzaga
- Father: Pedro, Prince Royal
- Mother: Maria Leopoldina of Austria

João Carlos, Prince of Beira (João Carlos Pedro Leopoldo Borromeo; 6 March 1821 – 4 February 1822) was a Portuguese infante (prince), son of heir-apparent to the throne Pedro, Prince Royal (future Emperor Pedro I of Brazil) and Maria Leopoldina of Austria.

== Ancestry ==
Ancestors of João Carlos, Prince of Beira

16. John V of Portugal
8. Peter III of Portugal
17. Maria Anna of Austria
4. John VI of Portugal and Brazil
18. Joseph I of Portugal
9. Maria I of Portugal and Brazil
19. Mariana Victoria of Spain
2. Pedro I of Brazil
20. Charles III of Spain (= 26, 28)
10. Charles IV of Spain
21. Maria Amalia of Saxony (= 27, 29)
5. Carlota Joaquina of Spain
22. Philip, Duke of Parma
11. Maria Luisa of Parma
23. Louise Élisabeth of France
1. João Carlos, Prince of Beira
24. Francis I, Holy Roman Emperor (= 30)
12. Leopold II, Holy Roman Emperor
25. Maria Theresa of Austria (= 31)
6. Francis II, Holy Roman Emperor
26. Charles III of Spain (= 20, 28)
13. Maria Louisa of Spain
27. Maria Amalia of Saxony (= 21, 29)
3. Maria Leopoldina of Austria
28. Charles III of Spain (= 20, 26)
14. Ferdinand I of the Two Sicilies
29. Maria Amalia of Saxony (= 21, 27)
7. Maria Theresa of Naples and Sicily
30. Francis I, Holy Roman Emperor (= 24)
15. Maria Carolina of Austria
31. Maria Theresa of Austria (= 25)
