= Henschel (surname) =

Henschel is a German surname. Notable people with the surname include:

- Alberto Henschel (1827–1882), German-Brazilian photographer
- August Wilhelm Henschel (1790–1856), German physician and botanist
- Carl Anton Henschel, the eponymous "son" founding Henschel & Son
- Christoph Henschel (born 1969), violinist with the Henschel Quartet
- Georg Christian Carl Henschel, founder of Henschel & Son
- Sir George Henschel (1850–1934), English baritone, pianist, conductor and composer
- Jane Henschel (born 1952), an American operatic mezzosoprano
- Markus Henschel (born 1969), violinist with the Henschel Quartet
- Milton George Henschel (1920-2003), member of the Governing Body of Jehovah's Witnesses and president of the Watch Tower Society
- Monika Henschel (born 1968), violist with the Henschel Quartet
- Otto Henschel (1880–1961), New York assemblyman 1914
- Wally Henschel (1893–1988), German chess player
- Wilhelm Henschel (1785-1865) German-Jewish artist, engraver, and lithographer, known for works produced together with his brothers, Friedrich, August, and Moritz Henschel, as the Henschel Brothers

== See also ==
- Hentschel
- Henschel (disambiguation)
