= Moreira Salles Institute =

- Instituto Moreira Salles
- Abbreviation: IMS
- Founded: 1992, Poços de Caldas, Minas Gerais, Brazil
- Founder: Walter Moreira Salles
- Type: Nonprofit organization
- Purpose: Photography, music, literature, iconography
- Location(s): Poços de Caldas; São Paulo; Rio de Janeiro
- Website: ims.com.br

The Moreira Salles Institute (Portuguese: Instituto Moreira Salles, IMS) is a Brazilian nonprofit organization founded by diplomat and banker Walter Moreira Salles in 1992, with the establishment of its first cultural center in the city of Poços de Caldas, Minas Gerais. Later, the institute expanded its operations to São Paulo (1996), in a mansion located in the Higienópolis neighborhood, and to Rio de Janeiro (1999), in a former Moreira Salles family residence, built in 1951 with architectural design by Olavo Redig de Campos and landscaping by Burle Marx. It is managed by the Moreira Salles family and is exclusively dedicated to the promotion, collection development, and implementation of cultural programs in the fields of photography, literature, iconography, visual arts, music, and cinema.

Part of its collections in these areas is available for public onsultation on the institute's website as well as in its cultural centers. The institute also operates online radio channels and publishes various materials, such as exhibition catalogs, books on literature, photography, and music, and two magazines: Zum (a semiannual publication on contemporary photography from Brazil and around the world) and Serrote (a quarterly magazine focused on essays and ideas). Since 2019, the institute has contributed with part of its collection in the public domain to Wikimedia Commons.

== Units ==
=== Poços de Caldas ===
The city of Poços de Caldas in Minas Gerais became home to IMS's first cultural center in 1992, a decision made by diplomat Walter Moreira Salles as a tribute to the region where his family settled in 1918.

=== Rio de Janeiro ===
Inaugurated in October 1999, in the Gávea neighborhood, IMS Rio is located in the house where Walter Moreira Salles and his family lived from the late 1940s. It hosts exhibitions, films, and concerts, in addition to housing extensive collections of photography, music, literature, and iconography. The house itself, designed by Olavo Redig de Campos, is a landmark of 1950s Brazilian modernist architecture, featuring gardens by Burle Marx.

=== São Paulo ===
Since 2017, the newest IMS headquarters is located in São Paulo, occupying 6,000 square meters at Paulista Avenue, 2424. Designed by the architectural firm Andrade Morettin, the building was inaugurated on 20 September 2017 after six years of construction, at an approximate cost of R$150 million. Spanning nine floors, the building includes three exhibition halls, a 150-seat cinetheater, a study space, three classrooms for lectures and courses, a café, and a restaurant led by Rodrigo Oliveira. It also hosts the monumental work ECHO by Richard Serra, installed in January 2019, the only sculpture by the artist in South America.

== Photographic collection ==
The Instituto Moreira Salles (IMS) maintains one of Brazil's most significant photographic collections, with a focus on acquiring, preserving, researching and providing access to archives that document the country's history, culture, communications and visual arts. The collection was established in 1995 with the acquisition of nineteenth-century photographs and was subsequently expanded through the incorporation of important archives, including the photographic collection of anthropologist Claude Lévi-Strauss, produced during his expeditions in Brazil in the 1930s.

The collection currently comprises approximately two million photographs by photographers including Augusto Malta, Alberto Henschel, Albert Frisch, Alécio de Andrade, Alice Brill, Augusto Stahl, Carlos Moskovics, Chico Albuquerque, Claude Lévi-Strauss, David Drew Zingg, Domingos de Miranda Ribeiro, Dulce Soares, Francisco du Bocage, Georg Leuzinger, Guilherme Gaensly, Guilherme Santos, Hans Gunter Flieg, Haruo Ohara, Henri Ballot, Hércules Florence, Hildegard Rosenthal, Horacio Coppola, José Medeiros, Juca Martins, Lily Sverner, Luciano Carneiro, Madalena Schwartz, Marc Ferrez, Marcel Gautherot, Martín Chambi, Maureen Bisilliat, Militão Augusto de Azevedo, Otto Stupakoff, Peter Scheier, Revert Henrique Klumb, Rossini Perez, Stefania Bril, Thomaz Farkas and Vincenzo Pastore.

In 2016, the IMS acquired the photographic archive of the Diários Associados media group, one of Brazil's largest media conglomerates during much of the twentieth century under the leadership of Assis Chateaubriand. The acquisition included the archives of newspapers published in Rio de Janeiro, such as O Jornal (founded in 1919), Diário da Noite (1929) and Jornal do Commercio, which was founded in 1827, became part of Diários Associados in 1957 and ceased publication in April 2016.

The IMS's cultural center on Paulista Avenue also houses a library dedicated exclusively to photography, with a collection capacity of approximately 30,000 volumes and other specialized materials.

== Gallery ==
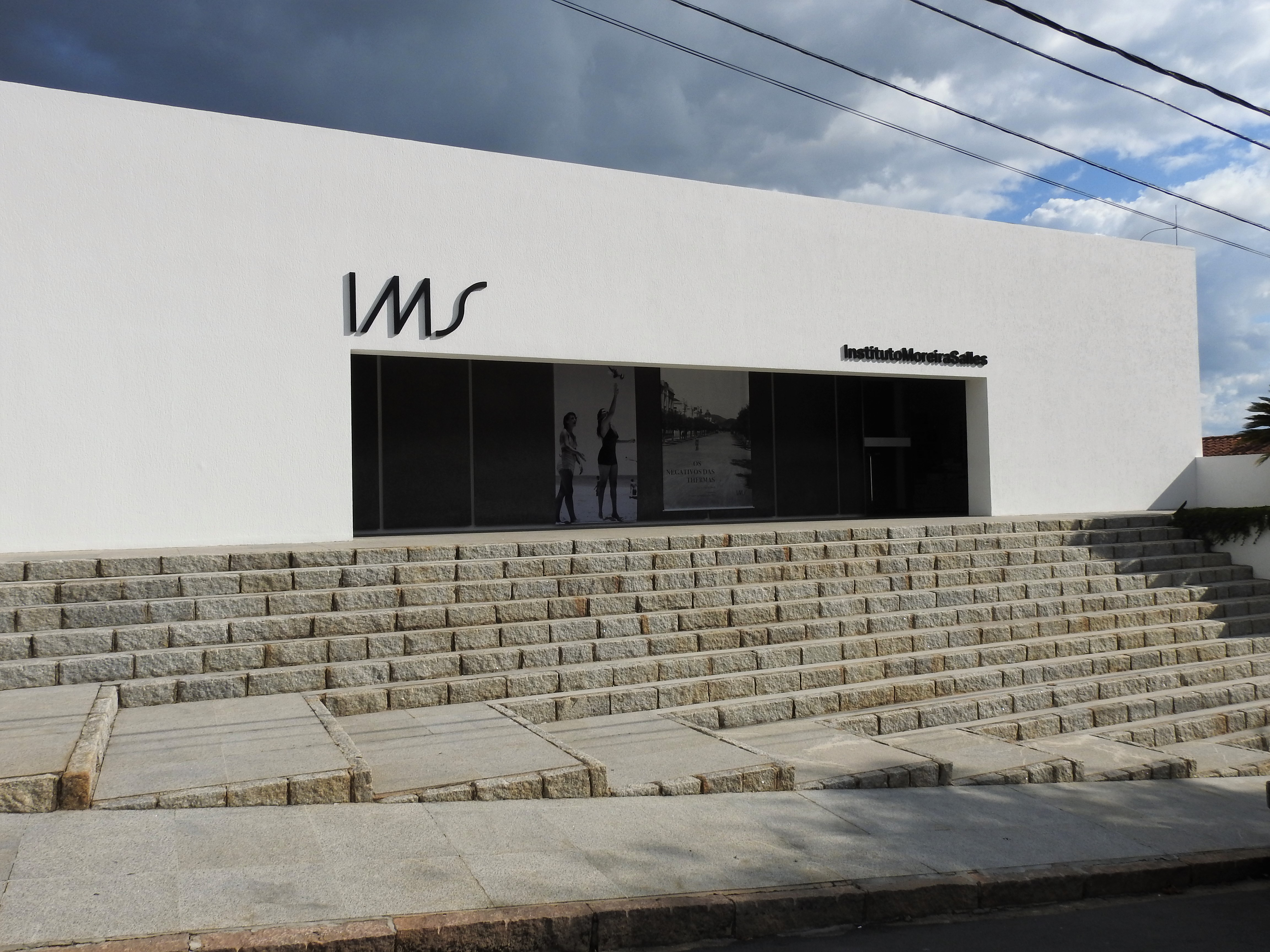
IMS Poços de Caldas

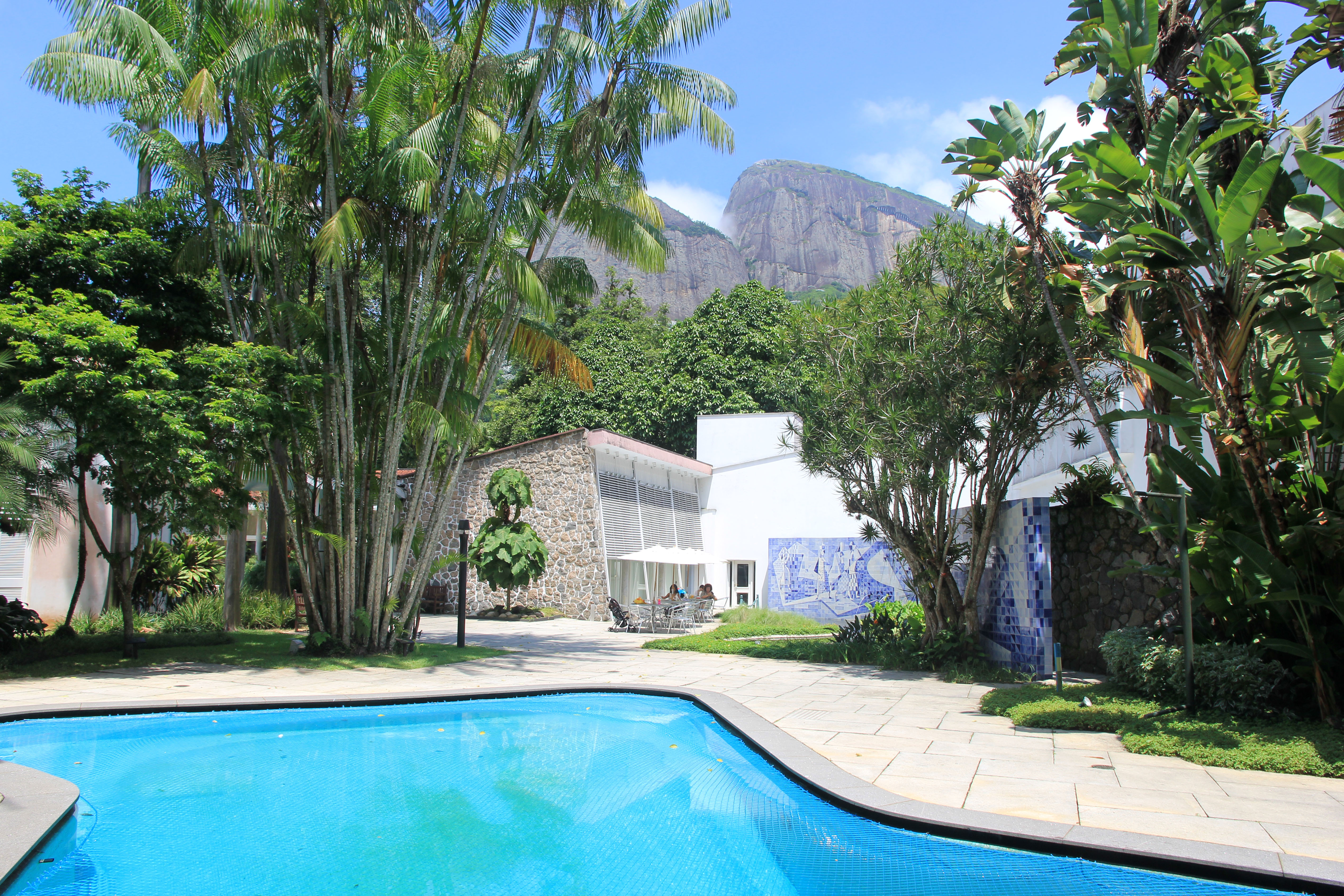
IMS Rio de Janeiro

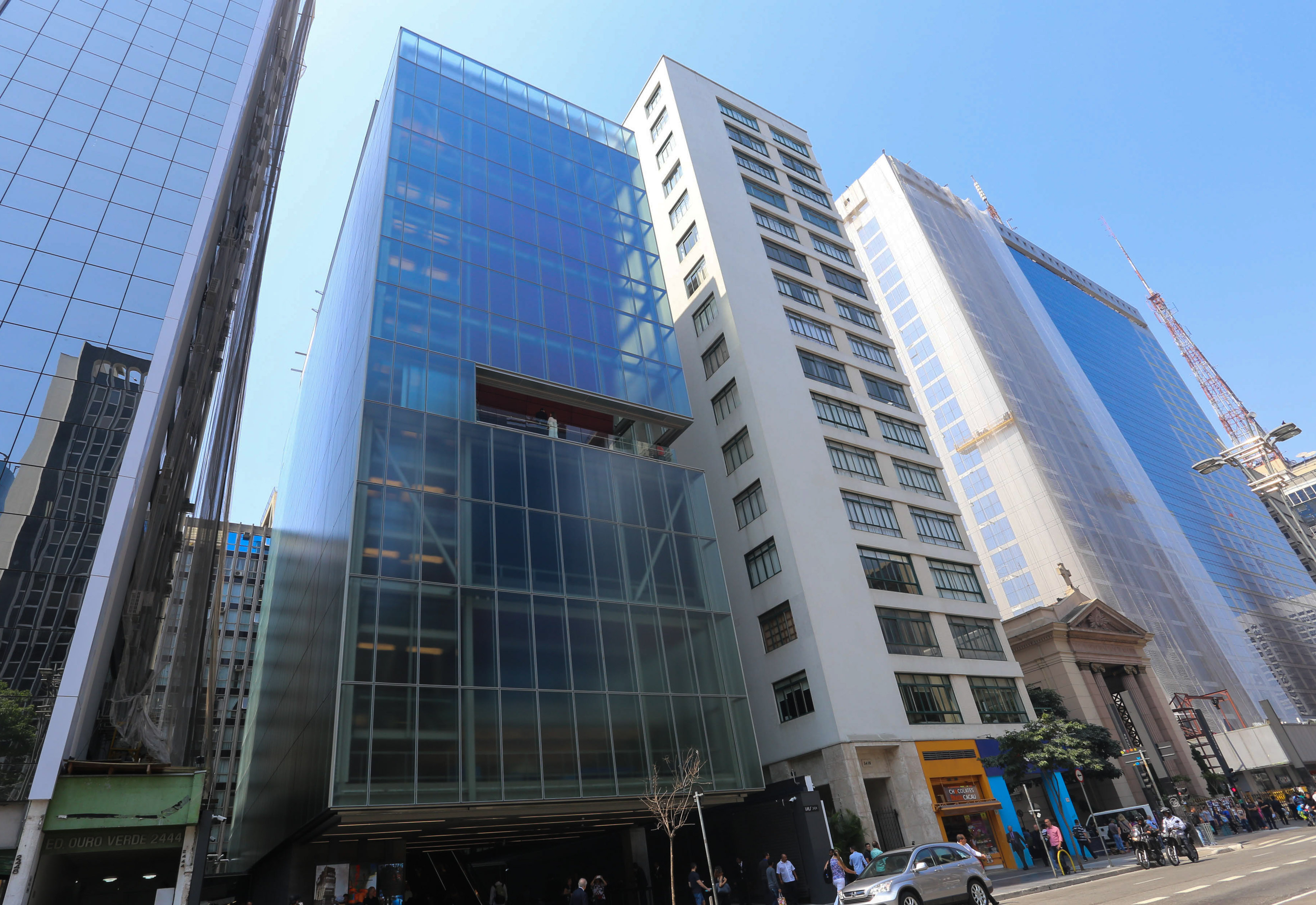
IMS São Paulo

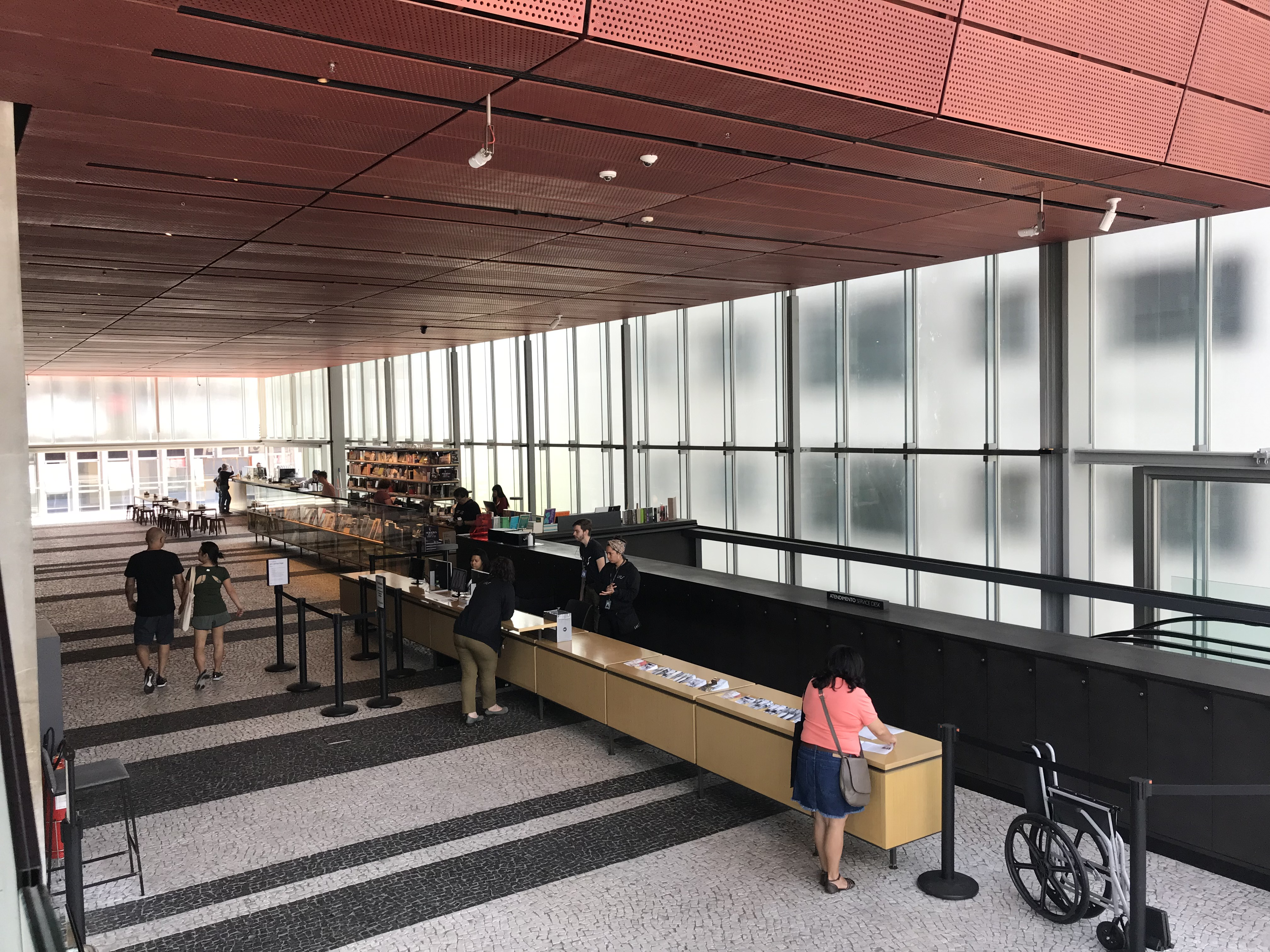
IMS São Paulo's library
