= Constantino Barza =

Brazilian photographer

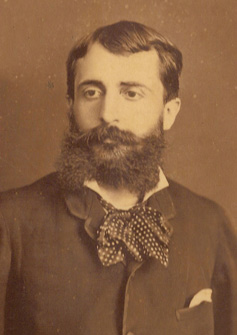
- Occupations: Businessman, photographer

Constantino Barza was a Brazilian photographer that operated between the second half of the 19th century and the beginning of the 20th century. Little is known about his biography, but it is known that he succeeded the photographer Alberto Henschel in the command of the atelier Photographia Allemã (German Photography) in Recife, in the end of the 19th century. Many photos of his authorship can be found in the digital archive Domínio Público.
