= Jorge Henrique Papf =

Brazilian photographer (1863–1920)

Jorge Henrique Papf (1863 in Berlin – 1920 in Petrópolis) was a German-Brazilian photographer and painter who lived during the second half of the 19th century and the beginning of the 20th century. Considered to be an excellent photographer of landscapes, he took the landscapes that illustrated the Guia de Petrópolis (Petrópolis Guide) of 1885, and also photographed a panorama with a circular perspective of 360° of the city of Petrópolis, in 1898. He inherited the job of his father, Karl Ernst Papf, who came to Brazil in 1867 together with the photographer Alberto Henschel.
