= Bisilliat =

Bisilliat is a surname. Notable people with the surname include:

- Louis Bisilliat (1931–2010), French cyclist
- Maureen Bisilliat (born 1931), Brazilian photographer
