= Hentschel =

Hentschel is a Germanic surname. People with this surname include:

- Carl Hentschel (1864–1930), British artist, photographer, printmaker, inventor and businessperson, and the original of "Harris" in Jerome K. Jerome's Three Men in a Boat (1889)
- Dan Hentschel (born 1996), American comedian and satirist
- David Hentschel (born 1952), English recording engineer, writer and music producer
- Erwin Hentschel (1917–1944), German Knight's Cross recipient
- Falk Hentschel (born 1982), German actor
- Franziska Hentschel (born 1970), German field hockey player
- Holger Hentschel (born 1985), German politician
- Johannes Hentschel (1908–1982), German master electro-mechanic
- Klaus Hentschel (born 1961), German historian of science
- Trent Hentschel (born 1982), Australian rules footballer
- York Hentschel (born 1953), Canadian football player
