= Henschel (disambiguation) =

Henschel most commonly refers to Henschel & Son, a former German manufacturer.

Henschel may also refer to:

== People ==
- Henschel (surname)

== See also ==
- Henschel Quartet, a German String Quartet comprising the three Henschel siblings and cellist Mathias Beyer-Karlshøj, who joined them in 1994
- Thyssen-Henschel, successor to Henschel & Son; industrial and defense contractor; since 1999 part of Rheinmetall Landsysteme GmbH
- Drayman Henschel, an 1898 play by the German playwright Gerhart Hauptmann
