= Copyright law of Brazil =

Aspect of Brazilian law

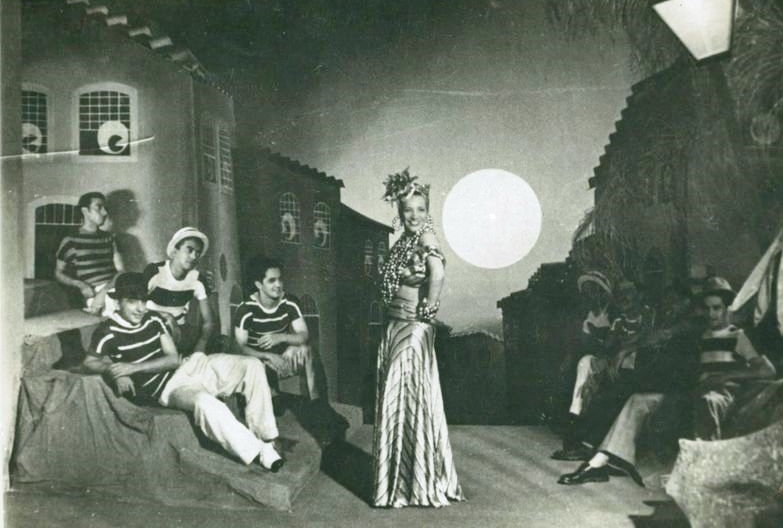
Production photo of the film Banana da Terra (1939), starring Carmen Miranda. By current copyright legislation in Brazil, this photo (and the film itself ) entered the public domain 70 years after 1 January 1940, i.e. 1 January 2010.

The copyright law of Brazil is primarily based on Law Nº9,610 of 19 February 1998. Additionally, Brazil has signed the Berne Convention and the TRIPS Agreement.

== History ==
=== Imperial period ===
Brazil's first constitution, the Imperial Constitution of 1824, did not deal with creative works, and instead only mentioned patents:

Os inventores terão a propriedade das suas descobertas, ou das suas producções. A Lei lhes assegurará um privilegio exclusivo temporario, ou lhes remunerará em resarcimento da perda, que hajam de soffrer pela vulgarisação.

Inventors will have ownership of their discoveries, or their productions. The Law will assure them an exclusive temporary privilege, or compensate them on losses they may suffer through dissemination. (Note: "Dissemination" is an imperfect translation; the original text's intent is of patent infringement)

— Imperial Constitution 1824, Art. 179. XXVI

The first legal document to deal with the protection of creative works in Brazil was the Law of 11 August 1827, which gave jurist course professors exclusive publication rights to their course's compendia for the 10 years following their approval by the government.

However, the general protection of creative works in Brazil first came from article 261 of the Criminal Code of 1830. It protected any text ("or stamp") which had been written, composed or translated by Brazilian citizens, for the lifetime of the author, plus 10 years if they had any heirs. If such works were made by corporations, the protection lasted for 10 years after publication.

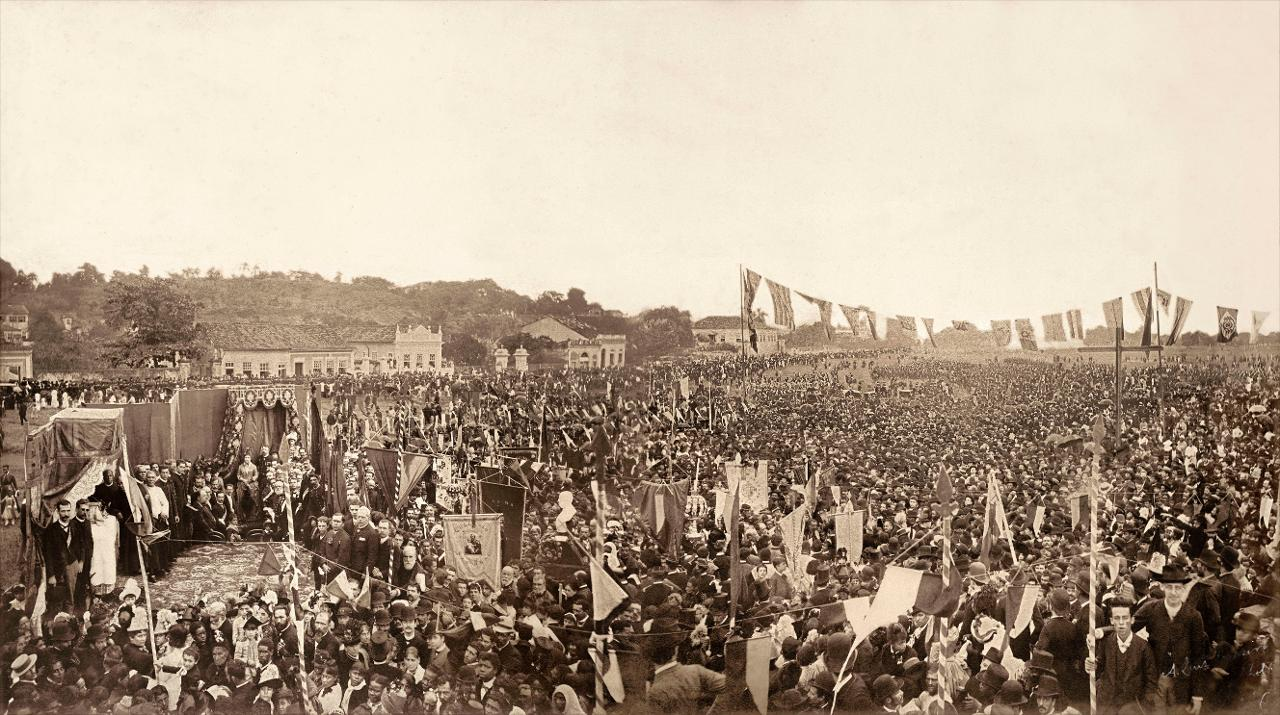
Photograph taken on 17 May 1888 depicting a mass celebrating the abolition of slavery in Brazil. As the Brazilian copyright law of the time did not consider artworks – much less photography, which was still in its infancy – the reproduction of such a photo would not be illegal.

While it was a step in the direction of an all-encompassing copyright protection, the Code of 1830 protected only written works, not any other kind of artwork; this and other issues would be criticized by scholars in the decades that followed its enactment.

For example, the then-barely invented photographs were also not considered for the 1830 text, and would likely not be illegal to reproduce in the following years as the technology developed. However, one must also consider the relative difficulty it would have been, in the mid to late 19th century, to copy or otherwise reproduce (a potentially single physical copy of) a photograph without authorization from the owner.

=== First Republic ===
Following the Proclamation of the Republic in 1889, copyright protections were expanded to encompass any type of artistic work – and no longer only literary works – in the Penal Code of 1890. The duration of copyright wasn't changed; it still lasted for the lifetime of the author, plus 10 years if they had any heirs.

In 1891, copyright would finally become constitutional, in the first constitution of the Brazilian republic. That, in itself, was a landmark in terms of Brazilian copyright protections. The law had a clear separation of patents and copyright, and delegated the duration of copyright to the Penal Code – as such, it remained as lifetime of the author, plus 10 years if there were heirs.

Aos autores de obras literárias e artísticas é garantido o direito exclusivo de reproduzi-las, pela imprensa ou por qualquer outro processo mecânico. Os herdeiros dos autores gozarão desse direito pelo tempo que a lei determinar.

To the authors of literary and artistic works is guaranteed the exclusive right to reproduce them, by press or any other mechanical process. Their heirs will enjoy that right for as long as the law determines.

— First Republic Constitution 1891, Art. 72 § 26

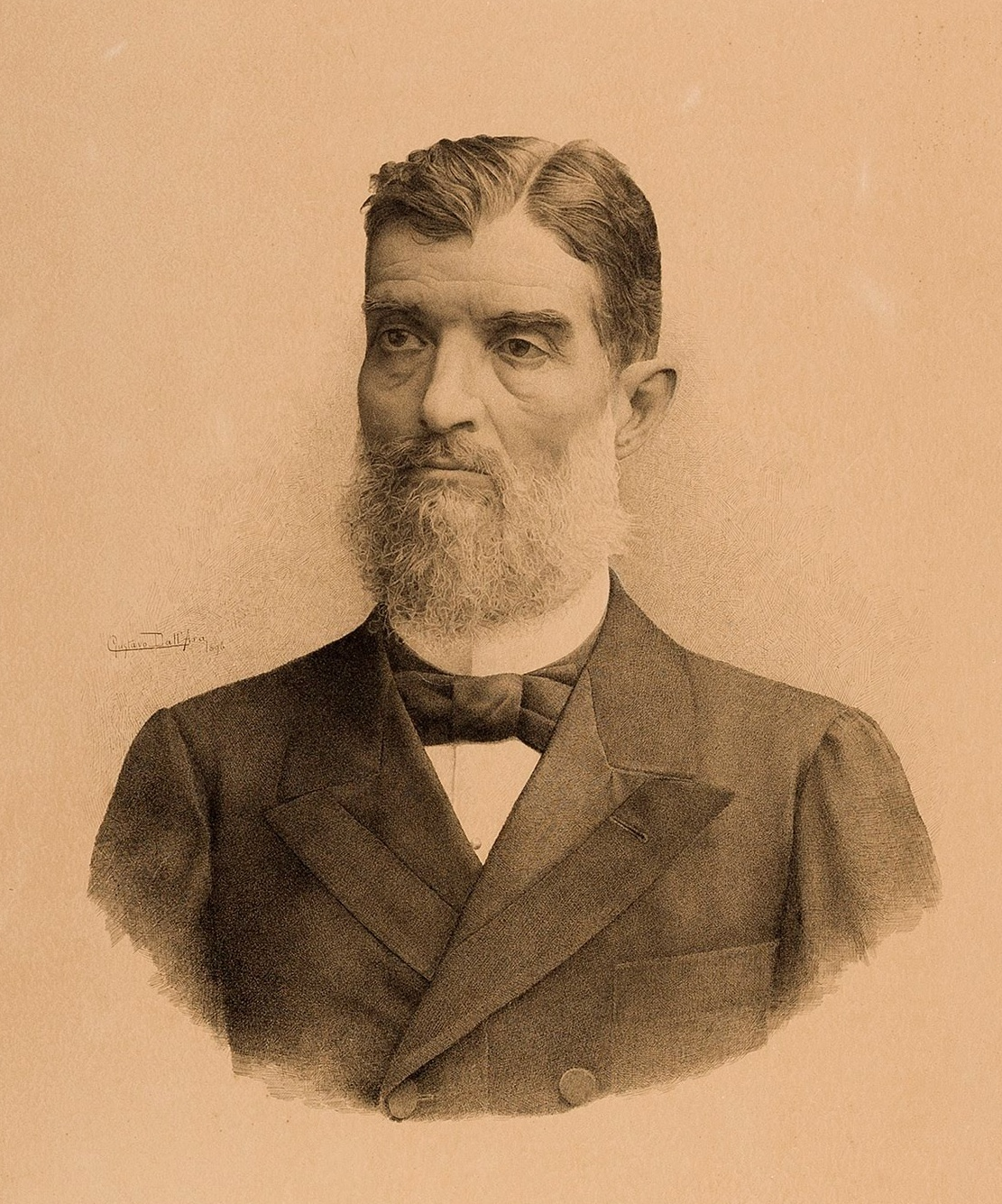
Because the 1898 law set a time limit for the registration of works to acquire copyrights, any work created before 1897 would be uncopyrightable. This is the case of this portrait illustration of Prudente de Morais, third president of Brazil, by Gustavo Dall'Ara, created in 1896.

On 1 August 1898, Law Nº496 was promulgated, the first to explicitly mention "author's rights". It protected an author's right to reproduce (or authorize the reproduction of) their work – be it "literary, scientific or artistic" – through "publication, translation, representation or execution of any other kind". Counting from 1 January of the year of publication, the protection lasted 50 years for exact reproductions (i.e. exact copies), but it would only protect for 10 years the exclusive right to translate or otherwise represent the work in a non-reproductive way.

For dead authors, owners of a posthumous work benefit from the author's rights, lasting 50 years counting from the date of death of the author. Author's rights of anonymous or pseudonym works belong to the work's editor, but if the author is found or discovered, they obtain the rights.

Crucially, this protection wasn't automatic: it was required that works be submitted to the National Library of Brazil until 31 December of the year following the publication. For printed works, photographs and lithographs, the submission required "a copy in perfect conservation status"; for paintings, drawings, sculptures or other, a "perfectly clear" photograph of the work. A side effect of this time limit is that it would have made works created before 1897 uncopyrightable, as they would need to have been registered before the law was even promulgated.

== Current copyright terms ==
For works in which the author is known, copyright lasts for the lifetime of the author plus 70 years, counting from 1 January of the subsequent year after their death.

If the author is unknown or anonymous, any unpublished work is in the public domain. For published works in which the author is anonymous or a pseudonym, the publishing party retains copyright for 70 years after publication, again counting from 1 January of the subsequent year. If the author is found or discovered before the work's copyright expires, it reverts to being lifetime plus 70 years.

Audiovisual works (such as films) and photographs are protected for 70 years after their publication, counting from 1 January of the subsequent year.

Apart from expired copyright and unknown authors, works in the public domain include those from authors who have died and left no successors.

=== Limitations ===
However, copyright is not all-encompassing in Brazil – it has some limitations. The following are not considered copyright infringements:

- The reproduction of:
  - Laws and technical standards;
  - News or informative articles, in periodicals, as long as the name of the original author (if there is one) and of the original publication are mentioned;
  - Public speeches, in periodicals;
  - Portraits or any other form of image representation, made-to-order, when reproduced by the owner, given that there is no opposition by the person represented in them or by their heirs;
  - Literary, artistic or scientific works, for exclusive use by the visually impaired, as long as the reproduction is noncommercial and uses braille or other appropriated procedure;
- The nonprofit reproduction, in a single exemplar of few excerpts, for private use by the copyist, if made by themself;
- The quotation in books, newspapers, magazines or any other means of communication, of sections of any work, for the purpose of study, criticism or controversy, of a justifiable amount of content, indicating the name of the author and the source of the work;
- The collection of lecture notes in an education institution by who they are directed to, barred their publication, in whole or in part, without authorization by the lecturer;
- The use of literary, artistic or scientific works, audio recordings and radio or television transmissions in commercial establishments, exclusively for demonstration to clients, as long as these establishments commercialize support or equipments that allow for its use;
- Theatrical representation and musical execution, when done at home or for exclusively didactic reasons in education establishments, given it is not-for-profit;
- The use of literary, artistic or scientific works to produce judiciary or administrative evidence;
- The reproduction, in any work, of small sections of existing works, of any nature, or of the full work, when dealing with plastic arts, whenever the reproduction itself is not the main purpose of the new work and that it does not harm the normal exploration of the reproduced work or cause unjustifiable loss to the interests of the original authors.

Paraphrasing and parodying are also allowed, given that they are neither faithful reproductions of the originating work, nor disparaging to it. Additionally, Brazilian law has a freedom of panorama clause, concerning permanently displayed works in the public space. It allows for their reproduction through paintings, drawings, photographs and "audiovisual procedures".

The legality of copying full works for private use is controversial. To the letter, the law technically disallows it – only "a single exemplar of few excerpts" is permitted. This would, for instance, prohibit the transferring of paid-for (whole) songs from a computer to a phone, or the photocopying of otherwise unavailable books by students to study at home. However, there is consensus by legal scholars that private copies do not constitute copyright infringement. This understanding was codified in the Penal Code of Brazil in 2003, essentially shielding offenders from criminal liability when copying for private use:

Art. 184. Violar direitos de autor e os que lhe são conexos:
[...] § 4o O disposto nos §§ 1o, 2o e 3o não se aplica quando se tratar de exceção ou limitação ao direito de autor ou os que lhe são conexos, em conformidade com o previsto na Lei nº 9.610, de 19 de fevereiro de 1998, nem a cópia de obra intelectual ou fonograma, em um só exemplar, para uso privado do copista, sem intuito de lucro direto ou indireto.

Art. 184. Violating author's rights and those related to it:
[...] § 4th The provisions at §§ 1st, 2nd and 3rd do not apply when dealing with exception or limitation to author's rights or those related to it, in conformity with the provisions of Law nº 9,610, of 19 February 1998, or with copy of intellectual work or phonogram, in a single exemplar, for private use by the copyist, without direct or indirect profit motive.

— Penal Code 1940, Art. 184 § 4

== See also ==
- Berne three-step test
- Portal Domínio Público

== Bibliography ==
=== Legislation ===
- "Law No. 9.610 February 19, 1998, on Copyright and Neighboring Rights". WIPO. 2013.
- "Constituição Politica do Imperio do Brazil (de 25 de Março de 1824)" (in Brazilian Portuguese). 25 March 1824.
- "Codigo Criminal do Imperio do Brazil" [Criminal Code of the Empire of Brazil] (in Brazilian Portuguese). 16 December 1830.
- "Lei Nº 496, de 1º de Agosto de 1898". Câmara dos Deputados (in Brazilian Portuguese). 1 August 1898.
- "Constituição da República dos Estados Unidos do Brasil (de 24 de Fevereiro de 1891)" (in Brazilian Portuguese). 24 February 1891.
- "Decreto-Lei Nº 2.848, de 7 de Dezembro de 1940" (in Brazilian Portuguese). 7 December 1940.

=== Academic works ===
- Dal Pizzol, Ricardo (21 December 2018). "Evolução histórica dos direitos autorais no Brasil". Trabalhos Acadêmicos de Pós-Graduação (in Brazilian Portuguese). 113: 309–330. doi:10.11606/issn.2318-8235.v113i0p309-330. S2CID 186643706.
- Gurjão, Paulo José (July 2019). A doutrina do Fair Use no direito autoral brasileiro: o uso da doutrina norte-americana do Fair Use como paradigma de interpretação da lei de direito autoral brasileira [The doctrine of Fair Use in author's rights in Brazil: the use of the north-american doctrine of Fair Use as a paradigm of interpretation of Brazilian author's rights legislation] (BA thesis) (in Brazilian Portuguese). Federal University of Rio de Janeiro.
- Abrão, Eliane Yachouh (2006). Alves, Marcus Vinicius Barili (ed.). Propriedade imaterial: Direitos autorais, propriedade industrial e bens de personalidade (in Brazilian Portuguese). Senac. ISBN 85-7359-513-2.
