= Karl Ernst Papf =

German-born Brazilian photographer (1833–1910)

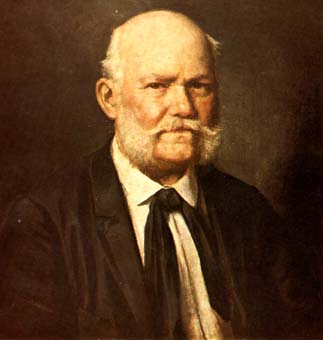
- Self-portrait (date unknown)
- Born: March 17, 1833; Dresden, Kingdom of Saxony
- Died: March 16, 1910; São Paulo, Brazil
- Other name: Ernesto Papf
- Occupations: Photographer; painter; designer

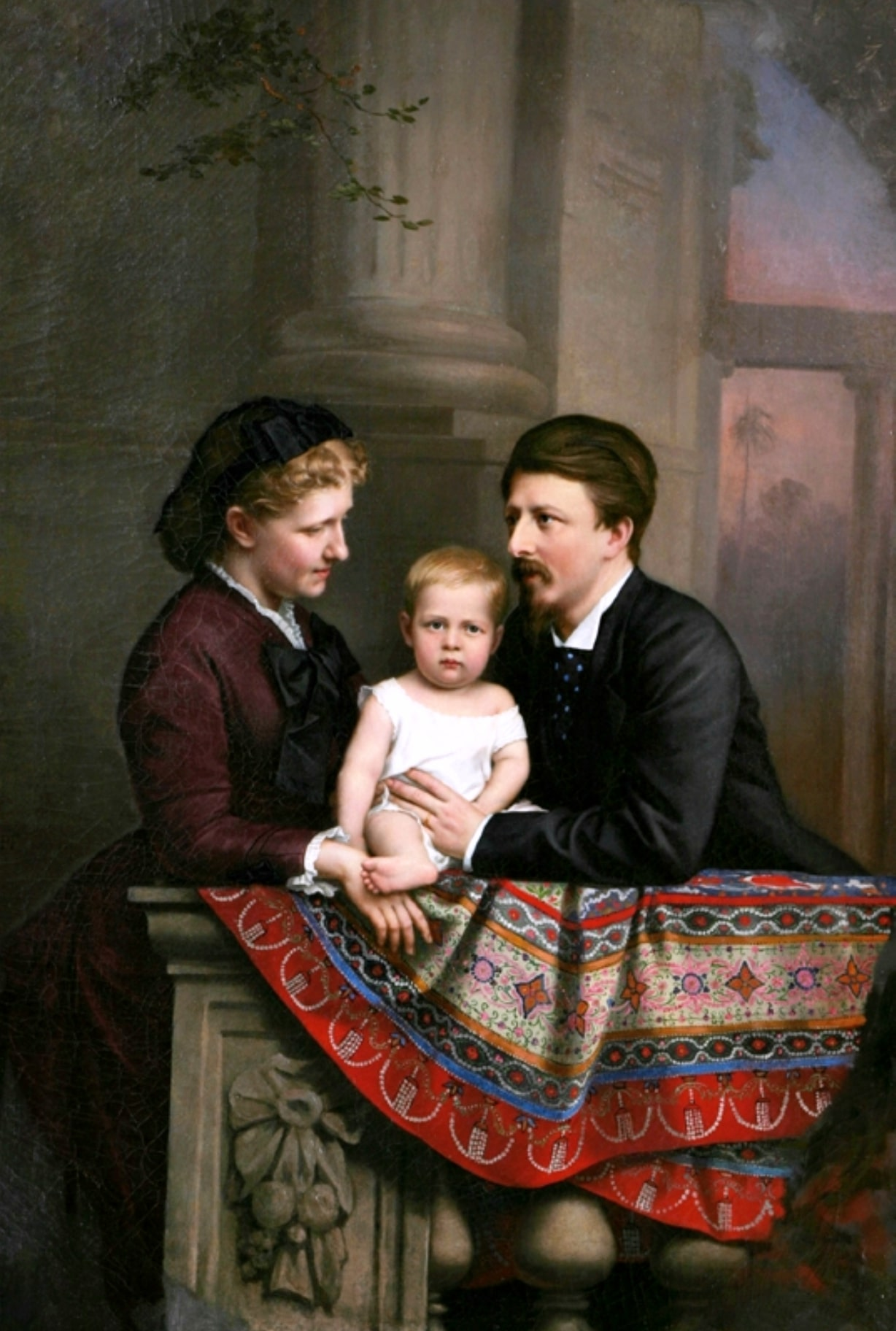
Princess Isabel of Brazil, her husband Prince Gaston and son Pedro de Alcântara. (1877)

Karl Ernst Papf, or Ernesto Papf (March 17, 1833 – March 16, 1910) was a German-born Brazilian photographer, painter and designer.

Papf was a prominent figure in the genre of fotopinturas, the process of retouching photographs to make them resemble oil paintings, having produced several portraits for the Brazilian Imperial Family.

== Biography ==
Papf was born in the city of Dresden, Kingdom of Saxony, on March 17 1833 to a family of miners. Not wishing to follow in his family's profession, Papf found the means to enroll at the Dresden Academy of Fine Arts in around 1850. Two years later, in 1852, Papf, then 19, saw one of his first successes with a painting dedicated to memories of his father. Later, in 1862, Papf would marry his first wife, Sofia Schaedlich. The following year, his first son, Jorge Henrique Papf, was born.

In 1867, Papf received an offer of employment from his compatriot Albert Henschel, who operated a photography studio in Brazil. That same year, Papf, along with his wife and young son, traveled to Brazil, working initially in the city of Recife. Following Henschel's opening of more branches in the next few years, Papf move to Salvador, remaining there until 1877 when he once again moved, this time to Rio de Janeiro, the then capital of the Empire of Brazil, where he expected to find a better environment to pursue his work.

Only a short time after his arrival in Rio de Janeiro, Papf, owing to his success and reputation as a photographer and painter, was invited to produce portraits of important figures of the Brazilian Imperial Family, including Princess Isabel and her Prince Gaston, Count of Eu. The following year, Papf moved to Niterói, where he would live from 1878 to 1880. During this period in Niterói, Papf's wife, Sofia, died, but he would soon be remarried to Helena Schaedlich, the niece of his late wife. Together, the two had five children.

In 1880, he settled in Petrópolis, where he represented Henschel's firm. By 1885, however, Papf had broken from Henschel's company and formed his own studio in conjunction with his eldest son, Jorge Henrique; their establishment was called Photografia Papf. In Petrópolis, Papf maintained a large orchid house, often using the flowers in his compositions.

As the nineteenth century reached an end, a great economic and social surge occurred in São Paulo, owing to a rapidly expanding coffee industry, and Papf, following the path of opportunity, bought a farm in Sabaúna in 1899 where he would reside until his death in São Paulo on March 16 1910, the day before his seventy-seventh birthday. Jorge Henrique would assume leadership of Photographia Papf until his own death in 1920.

== Works ==
During his career, Papf was well known for his portrait paintings based on photographs. This type of work was a more economical alternative to traditional painted portraits in the 19th century. It was commonly sought after by the lower-upper class of Imperial Brazil, who used this type of art to perpetuate their social standing.

Papf's works stand out for their strong realism and concern with symmetry. In Children (1886), the contour of the lips, eyes and ears, clearly defined by the artist's hand, serves as a strong example of Papf's ability for crafting realism.

Besides fotopinturas and portraits, Papf also produced many landscape paintings throughout the duration of his career. The painting Praia do Cavalao (1878) is recognized for the artist's skillful use of colors and contrast. Papf's landscapes were praised by critics for their ability to bring together classical concepts of Dutch landscaping, which had a strong influence on his formal training, while intimately integrating native Brazilian vegetation.

== Legacy ==
During his lifetime, Papf was well known as an artist, much of his popularity owing to his portrayal of important figures of the Brazilian Royal Family. His works enjoyed strong commercial appeal and success, which, according to historian, art critic and author of Papf's biography Carlos Roberto Maciel Levy, caused his work to be largely ignored through the recent history of art in Brazil. The art critic Gonzaga Duque, in a brief commentary on Papf, noted that although very famous among his contemporaries, Papf has been little remembered since.

In 1980, an exhibit of his works was held in Rio de Janeiro and São Paulo, in the Imperial Museum and in the Pinacoteca do Estado de São Paulo respectively.
