= Augusto Malta =

- Malta in 1911
- Born: 14 May 1864; Mata Grande, Alagoas, Empire of Brazil
- Died: 30 June 1957 (aged 93); Rio de Janeiro, Brazil
- Occupation: Photographer

Augusto César Malta de Campos (14 May 1864 — 30 June 1957), was a Brazilian photographer who served as the official photographer for the Federal District between 1903 and 1936. During this period, he captured more than eighty thousand photographs; his work now stands as one of the primary visual records of the transformations that took place in the city of Rio de Janeiro in the early 20th century.

== Biography ==
=== Early years and family ===
Malta was born in Mata Grande, in the countryside of Alagoas, in 1864. He lived in the province until the age of 22—in 1886—when he left for Recife, where he served as a cadet sergeant in the Imperial Brazilian Army. During this period, he became a republican and took part in revolutionary meetings with students.

At the end of 1888, he arrived in Rio de Janeiro and began working at the furniture and upholstery firm Casa Leandro Martins, located on Ourives Street (now Miguel Couto Street). He worked as a clerical assistant and, the following year, was promoted to bookkeeper. Also in 1889, he took part in the events surrounding the proclamation of the Republic in Brazil, serving as one of the signatories to the oath read at the Chamber of the Neutral Municipality, which inaugurated the provisional republican government.

In the 1890s, he married a distant cousin, Laura Oliveira Campos, who was from Alagoas. The couple had four daughters—Luthgardes, Arethusa, Callisthene, and Aristocléa—and one son, Aristógiton. All of the couple’s daughters died of tuberculosis, while Aristógiton went on to become a photographer like his father. In 1905, Laura passed away, and Malta began living in a common-law marriage with Celina Augusta Verschueren, a nanny of Belgian origin who had worked for Laura's children since the age of fifteen. With Celina, he had four more children: Dirce, Eglé, Uriel, and Amaltéa.

=== Official photographer ===
In 1900, Malta sold fine fabrics in the center of Rio de Janeiro and used a bicycle to deliver orders. One of his customers, a Navy midshipman, proposed trading his camera for Malta's bicycle. Following this exchange, Malta began to take an interest in photography. In 1903, he was introduced—by contractor Antônio Alves da Silva Júnior, a supplier for the Federal District municipal government who had already seen his photographs—to Mayor Francisco Pereira Passos. The mayor was spearheading a major urban renewal project in the city, which came to be known as the "Bota-Abaixo" (Tear It Down). Passos needed a photographer to document the construction work and the properties slated for expropriation, for the purpose of calculating future compensation payments. In June, under Municipal Decree 445, Augusto Malta was appointed as the official photographer for the Federal District municipal government. The position was created specifically for him and fell under the jurisdiction of the Federal District's General Directorate of Public Works and Transportation. Malta remained with the municipal government until his retirement in 1936.

In 1905, he was hired by The Rio de Janeiro Tramway, Light and Power Company Limited—which would become popularly known as "Light." Over the years, while working for the company, Malta photographed Light's modernization efforts in Rio de Janeiro, such as the implementation of electric tramways and public lighting.

Among the events documented in his work are the demolition of Morro do Castelo, the Vaccine Revolt, the inauguration of the Central Avenue (now Rio Branco Avenue), the 1908 National Exhibition, the 1922 Independence Centennial Exhibition, and the unveiling of the Christ the Redeemer statue. He also captured images of daily life, architecture, urban changes (such as the emergence of the first favelas), and cultural manifestations—including festivals, Carnival, the "Battles of the Flowers," and civic and military parades.

In 1945, Malta was compared to Marc Ferrez (1843–1923) in the Boletim da Sociedade de Geographia do Rio de Janeiro: "The photographic and illustrative documentation was, as one can see, both abundant and valuable—derived from drawings by Rugendas and others, as well as photographs by Marc Ferrez, who, during the Empire, fulfilled a role that would later be carried out in Rio by Augusto Malta, the municipal government's photographer: that of documenting the major events of his time through images."

Malta died on 30 June 1957 at the Hospital of the Third Order of Penance due to heart failure. He was buried the following day at the Caju Cemetery.

== Work ==
Most of Augusto Malta's photographs are divided between the Museum of Image and Sound of Rio de Janeiro (MIS-RJ) and the General Archive of the City of Rio de Janeiro. The MIS-RJ collection comprises approximately 27,700 photographs, as well as 1,700 glass-plate negatives and 115 panoramic negatives that have been restored. In total, this collection holds more than 80,000 photographs, including 2,600 glass-plate negatives and 40 panoramic negatives. Other significant repositories of the photographer's work include the Brazilian Historic and Geographic Institute, the Moreira Salles Institute, the National Library, and the National Historical Museum.

Photographic contributions by him can be found in the Boletim Fotográfico (1900–1914).

== Gallery ==
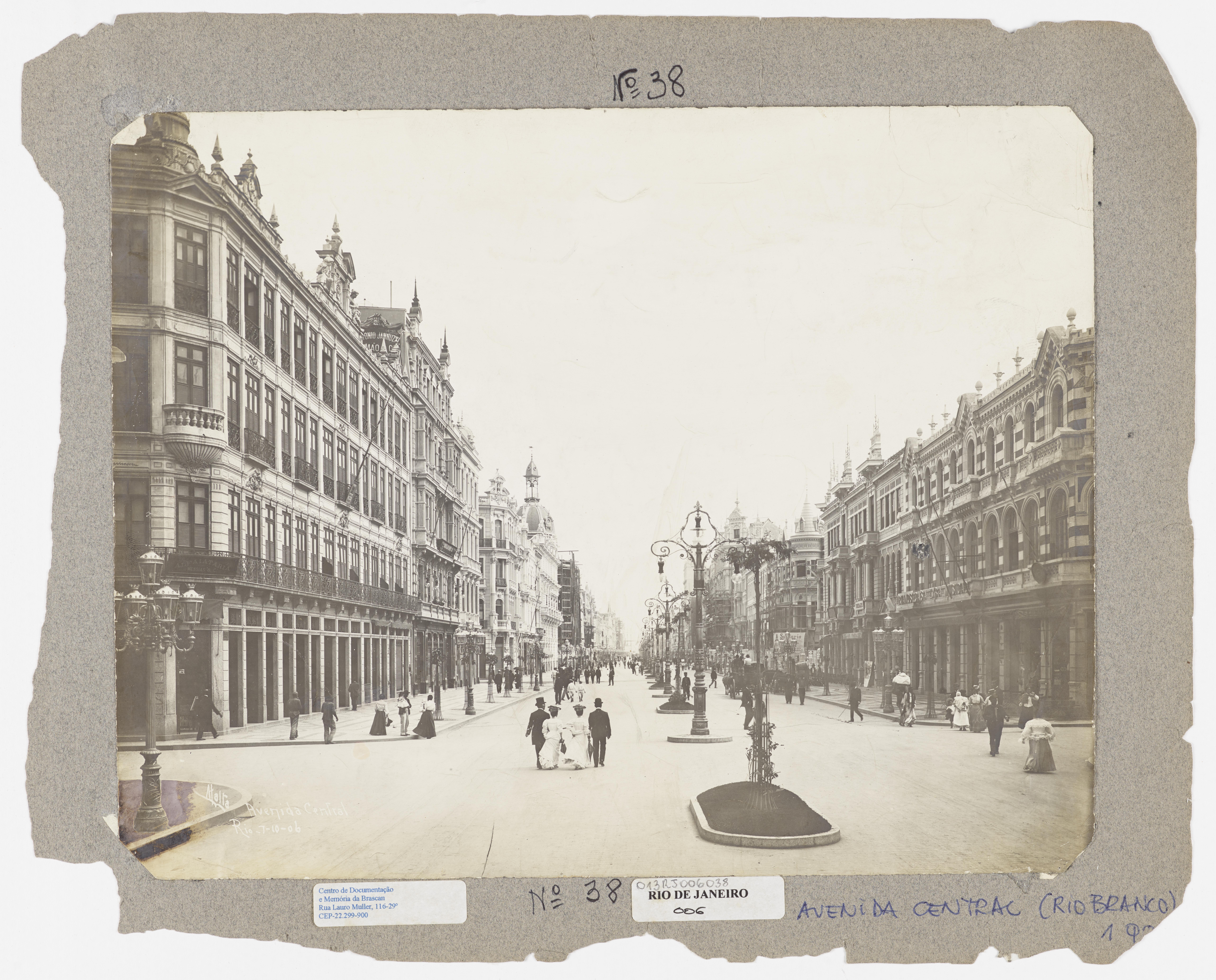
Central Avenue, now Rio Branco Avenue, one year after the inauguration of the incandescent lighting installation, in 1906

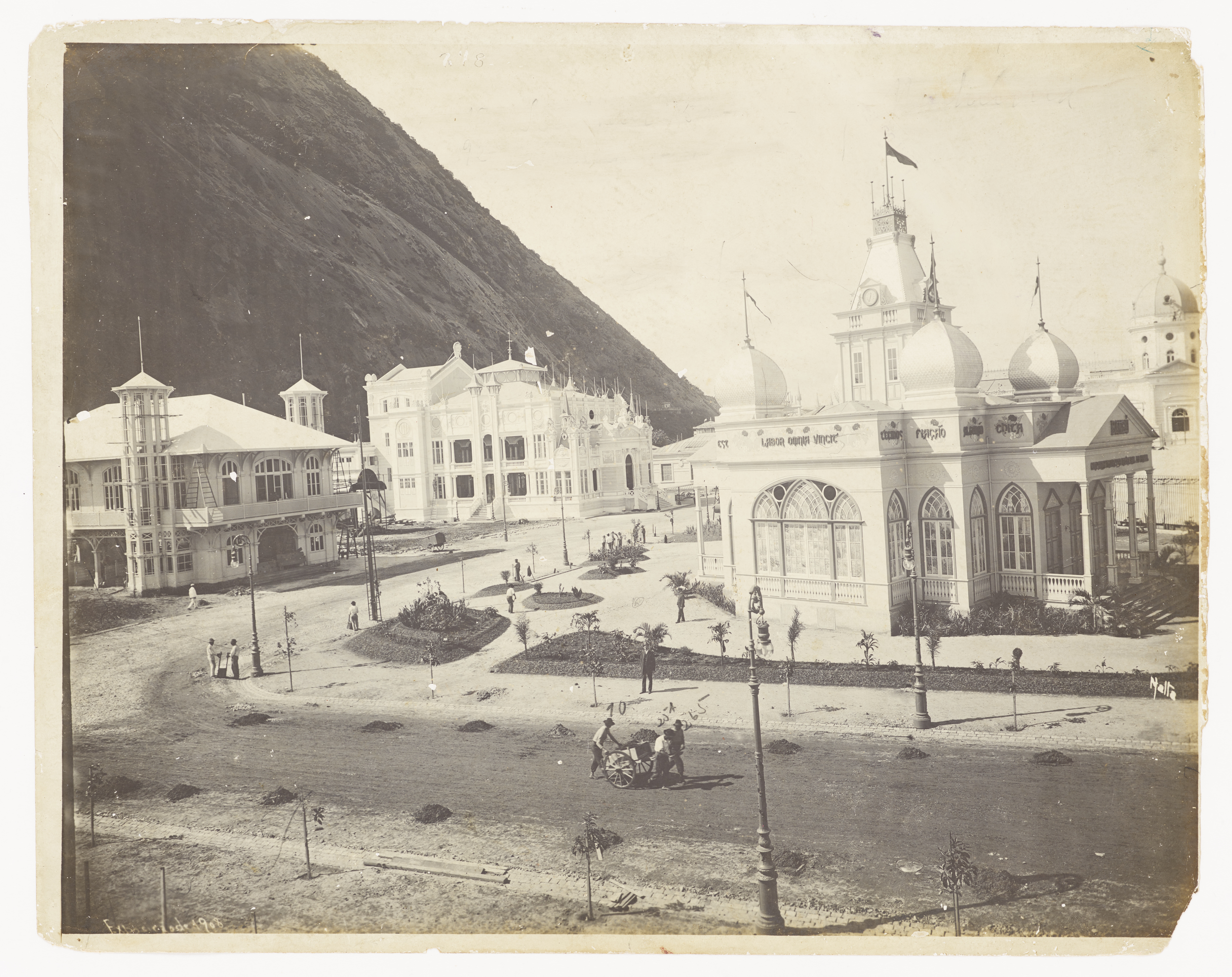
1908 exhibition, Moreira Salles Institute collection

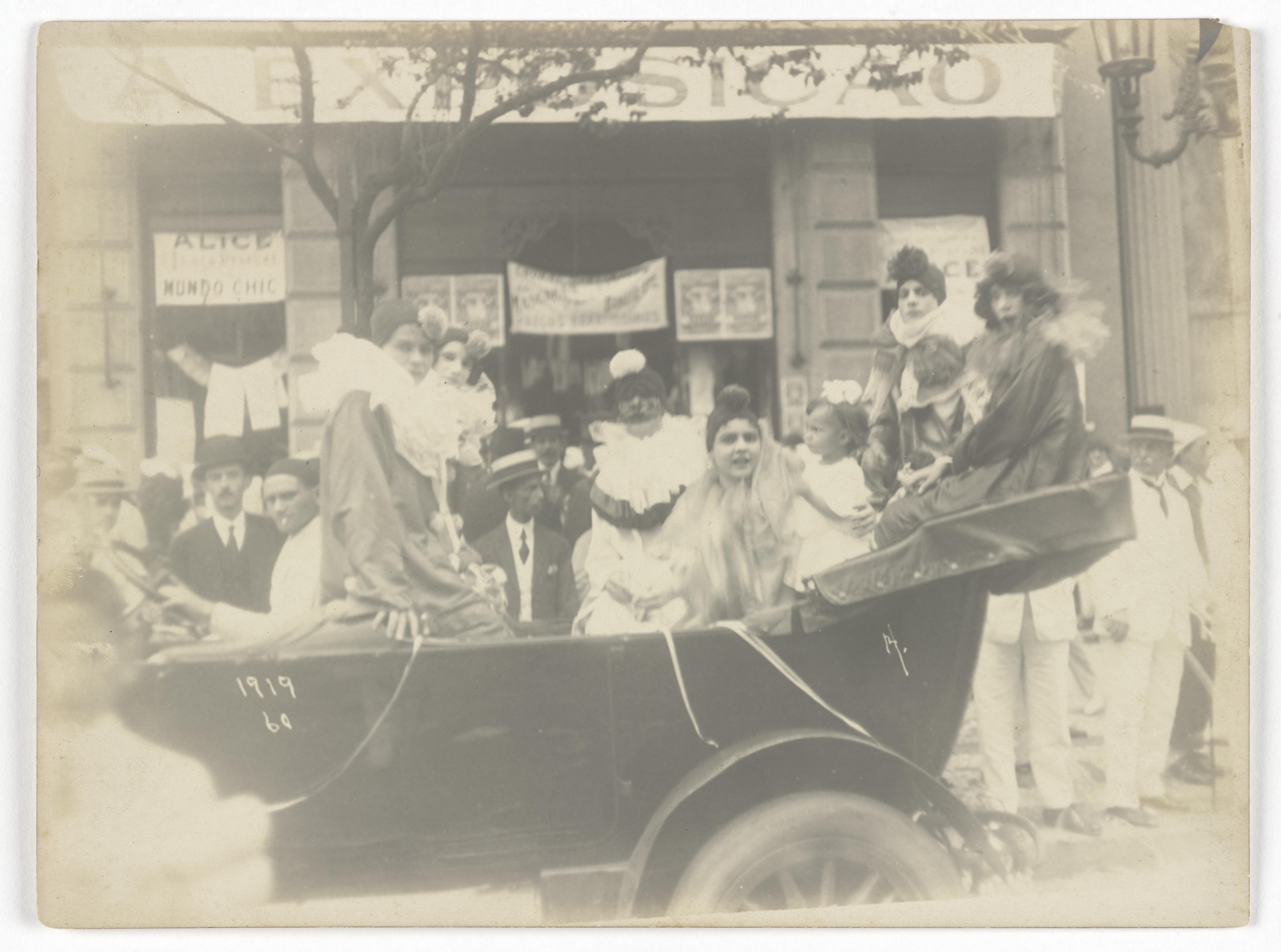
A corso parade during the grand Carnival of 1919 in Brazil, following a major Spanish flu epidemic in the city

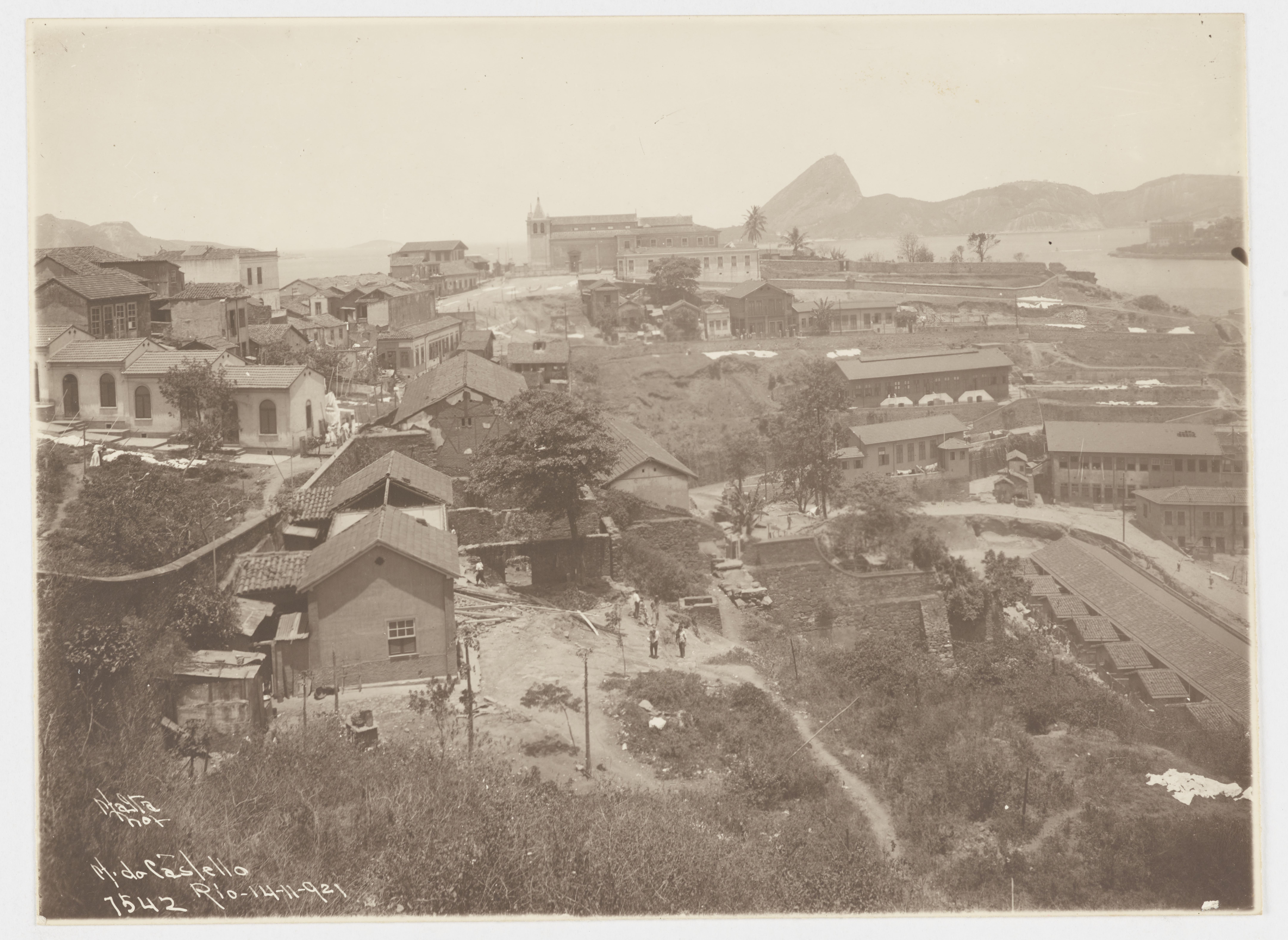
Morro do Castelo, with the Church of São Sebastião and Sugarloaf Mountain in the background. Photo taken in 1921. Collection of the Moreira Salles Institute

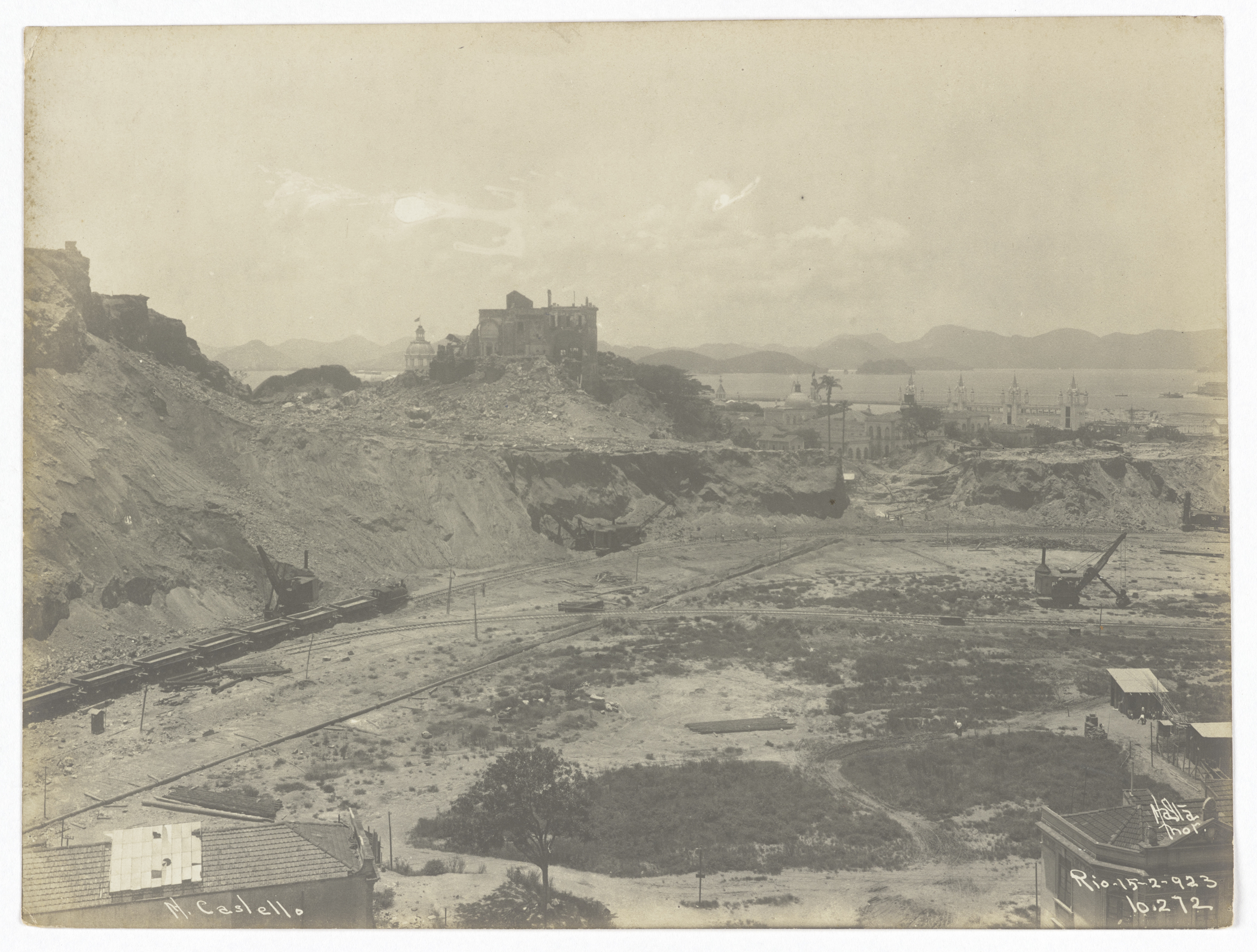
Ruins of Morro do Castelo; in the background, pavilions from the 1922 Centennial Exhibition. Moreira Salles Institute collection

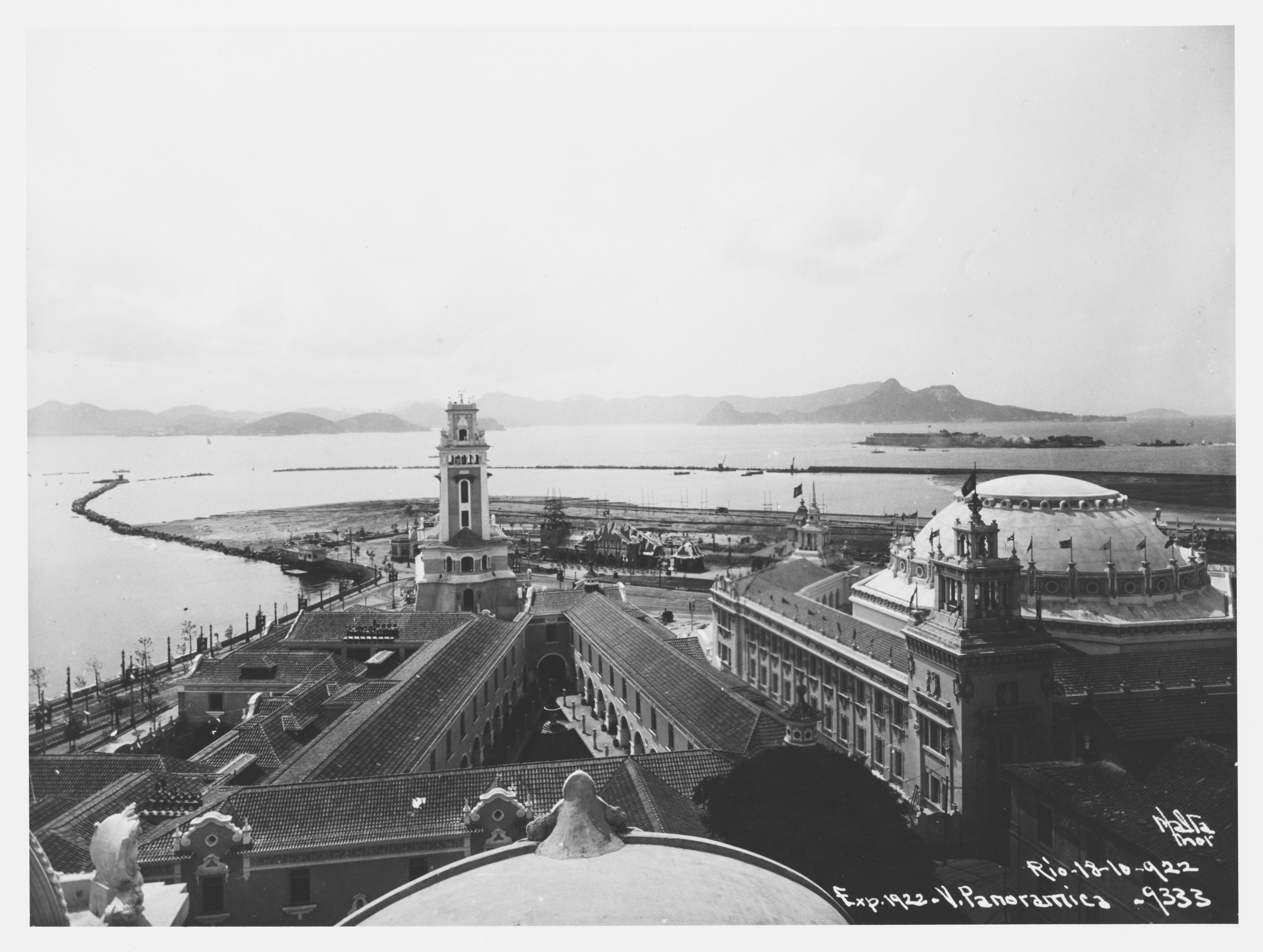
1922 Exhibition

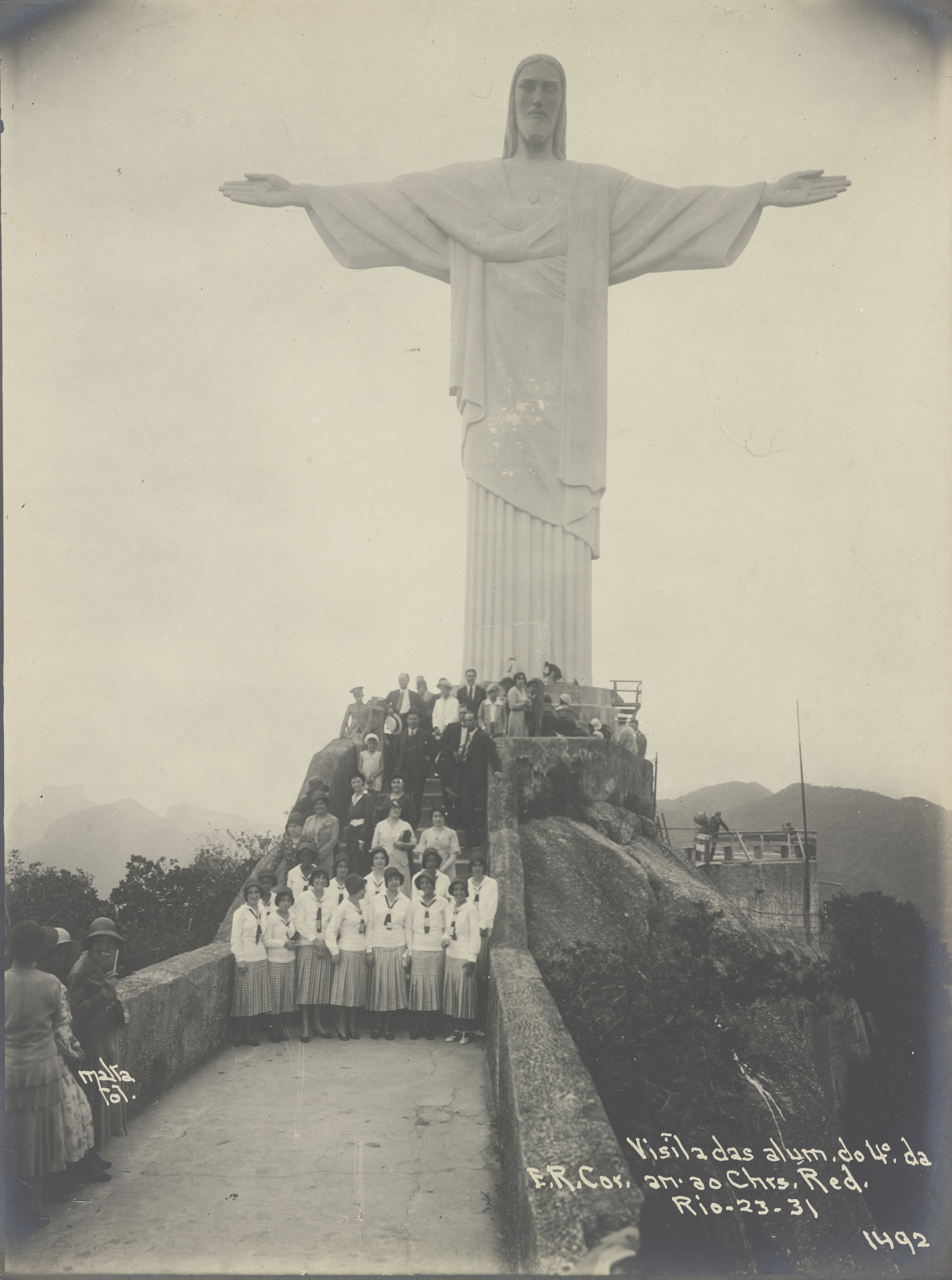
Students visiting the newly inaugurated Christ the Redeemer in 1931; collection of the Moreira Salles Institute
