= Dan Hentschel =

American performance artist and satirist (born 1996)

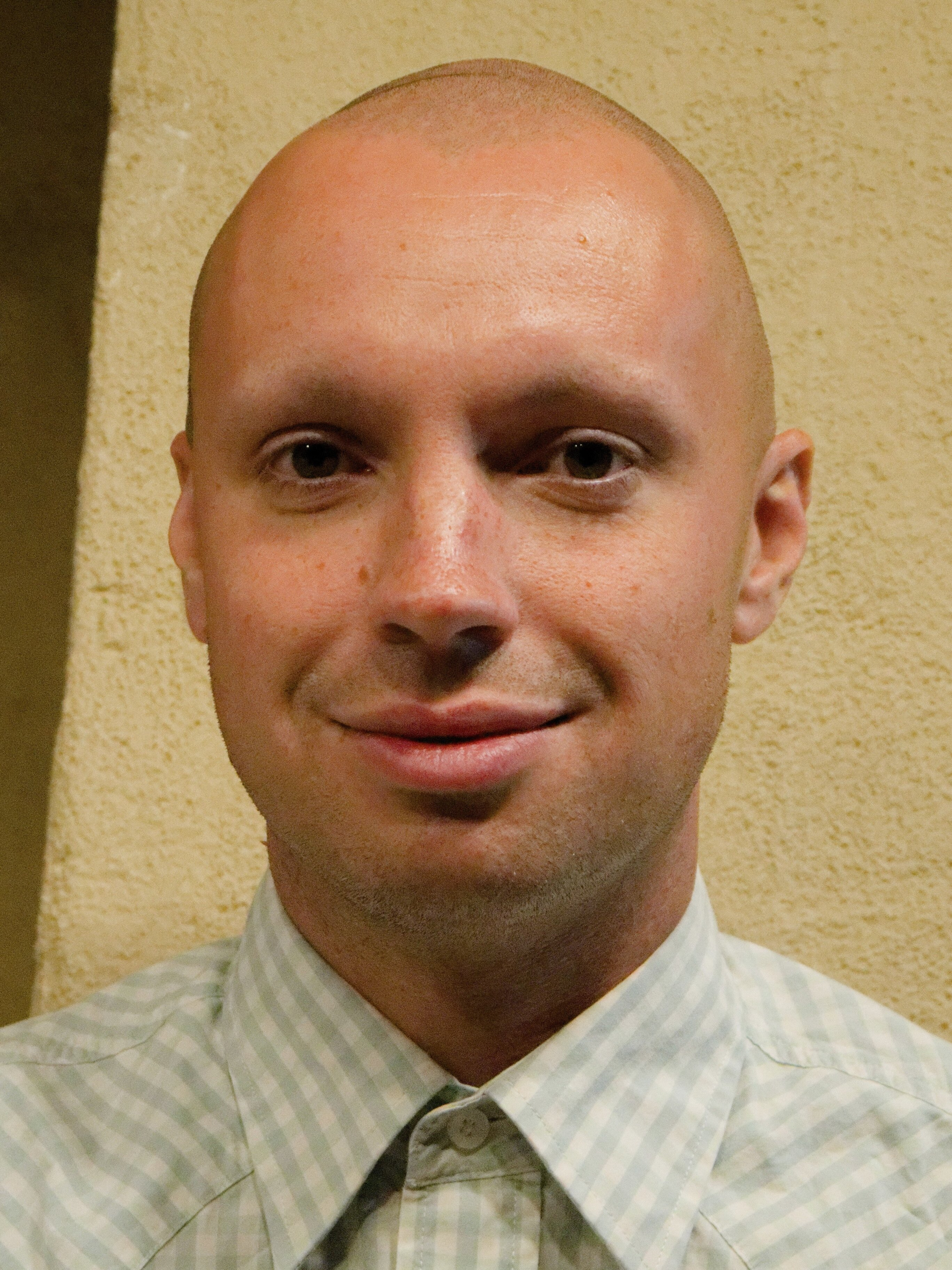
- Hentschel in 2025
- Born: Daniel George Hentschel; June 4, 1996 (age 30); Baltimore, Maryland, U.S.
- Education: Savannah College of Art and Design

Comedy career
- Years active: 2017–present
- Medium: Social media; stand-up; viral stunts
- Genres: Satire; parody; black comedy; surreal comedy; psychological horror; analog horror; Experimental film; horror comedy

Instagram information
- Page: danhentschel
- Followers: 685 thousand

YouTube information
- Channel: @dan_hentschel
- Years active: 2022–present
- Subscribers: 663 thousand
- Views: 98 million
- Last updated: October 14, 2026

Daniel George Hentschel (born June 4, 1996) is an American actor, comedian, filmmaker, YouTuber, and satirist, known for creating caricatures of himself, and other satirical characters. Through his viral stunts, he has repeatedly deceived news outlets and viewers of his content into believing parody stories and advice.

Hentschel first became a viral phenomenon after posting satirical relationship advice on TikTok in 2021. On his YouTube channel, he frequently films lengthy videos with absurd premises in his car. Hentschel's content has been mentioned by many news outlets including New York Post, Vice, Rolling Stone, and The Guardian.

== Early life and education ==
Daniel George Hentschel, was born on June 4, 1996, and was raised in a Catholic household in Harford County, Maryland. (Note: Hentschel, Dan (February 13, 2025). "Yes, My School Shooter Joke Actually Got Me In Legal Trouble". YouTube. 25:30.) He attended The John Carroll School. Hentschel won the first prize at the Baltimore High School Film Festival. He received a major in Dramatic Writing at Savannah College of Art and Design (SCAD) in Georgia.

Hentschel first began working as a stand-up comedian in 2017 during his studies at SCAD, performing in two talent shows and becoming the Vice President of the college's stand-up comedy club. Hentschel later moved to Los Angeles, California.

== Career ==
In 2012, Hentschel made his first viral post; a review of the book The Fault in Our Stars by John Green that he posted on Tumblr.

In 2021, Hentschel had his first mainstream breakthrough on TikTok. The video featured Hentschel reviewing canned sardines in an unappetizing way — which would quickly get viewer attention. He would go on to post many similar videos.

In 2022, Hentschel gained widespread attention when he posted a series of videos to TikTok with satirical relationship advice, such as how to use a water bottle to determine whether someone is having an affair, in a video with over 10 million views on TikTok. And a video wherein he suggested that viewers should photoshop their ex out of an old photo to see if their partner would notice, claiming it was a "genius" method to detect if a significant other still has romantic feelings for their ex. The video was then posted by the New York Post. In December 2022, Vice and ABC reported that the idea of "quiet quitting" a relationship could be attributed to Hentschel, after he uploaded a video where he pretended to be a psychiatrist and gave satirical relationship advice.

In June 2023, Hentschel posted a series of videos on TikTok where he convinced viewers he had put salt in his partner's water in order to dehydrate her. The videos showed Hentschel in various costumes as he claimed to put bacon grease in his partner's beauty products. The storyline led to her being hospitalized for poisoning and dying. The joke was an elaborate parody that involved a fake mugshot photo of Hentschel, a fake New York Post article and doctored security footage. After changing his TikTok profile to appear as a true crime news outlet, Hentschel was able to fool viewers into thinking the story was real, including fans who did not know it was his TikTok account.

In August 2024, Hentschel claimed to have taken his girlfriend on a road trip across the United States, with the road layout spelling the words "Will You Marry Me". He followed up by implying that at the end of the road trip, his girlfriend had broken up with him; the fake story immediately caught the attention of some news outlets.

=== Legal issues ===
In January 2025, Hentschel posted a video on social media where he stood on the campus of The John Carroll School, his former school. In the video, he says that he was "almost a school shooter" in 2013 and describes alleged memories of wanting to fire an AK-47 into the bleachers during a sophomore homecoming game. The video caught the attention of administrative staff at The John Carroll School, who identified Hentschel and alerted authorities on January 4. Later that month, the Bel Air Police Department launched a criminal investigation into Hentschel, releasing a statement on Facebook in which they called the video "disturbing". Despite assuring the public that Hentschel and his immediate family did not have access to firearms, Hentschel faced a trespassing charge.

== Comedic style ==
Hentschel's video "Reading the Wikipedia for TENERIFE AIRPORT DISASTER", posted 6 June 2026. Hentschel frequently films lengthy videos with outrageous premises in his car.

Hentschel admits that "an accidental byproduct" of his videos have been "how outrageous [he can] make the premise", with viewers openly relating to his satirical behavior. Hentschel's videos, some of which are up to 145 minutes in length, are filmed in his car with his camera propped up on his dashboard unedited. He believes that viewers enjoy his content because it feels "spontaneous" and realistic. Due to the fact he does not edit his videos, Hentschel believes it "feels like somebody who's just talking to you", which adds to the realism of the satire and sympathetic approach to some of his characters.

Hentschel has stated that his comedic inspirations have included John Mulaney, Amy Schumer, Michelle Wolf and Mike Birbiglia. He also mentioned that he used to be a fan of Louis C.K., but disavowed him due to his sexual misconduct allegations.

=== Characters ===
Hentschel is known for creating caricatures of himself and other original characters. In his early YouTube and late TikTok days, he mostly played characters with social or professional dominance—most notably a disgruntled therapist who documented his hatred for his patients, a teacher going through a mental breakdown, a judge handing out life sentences to avoid missing lunch, and a priest. When this was pointed out on "I need God Pod", Hentschel suggested that these flawed characters of authority may have been subconsciously inspired by his mother. Common themes throughout Hentschel's newer videos involve disgruntled employees, anti-establishment influencers, characters recounting themselves committing a crime such as murder, and characters suffering mental crises. He often wears face paint or over-the-top costumes while performing mundane tasks to gain viewer attention.
