= Portal Domínio Público =

Public Domain Portal
- Native name: Portal Domínio Público
- Website type: Digital library
- Available in: Portuguese (primarily)
- Owner: Government of Brazil
- Creators: Tarso Genro; Fernando Haddad
- Parent: Secretariat for Distance Education (Secretaria de Educação à Distância) of the Ministry of Education (Ministério da Educação)
- Website: www.dominiopublico.gov.br
- Commercial: No
- Registration: No
- Launched: 16 November 2004; 21 years ago
- Current status: Active
- Content license: Public domain

Portal Domínio Público (lit. 'Public Domain Portal') is a digital library launched by the government of Brazil in November 2004. It was founded as part of the Secretariat for Distance Education (Secretaria de Educação à Distância) of the Ministry of Education (Ministério da Educação) with the goal of preserving and sharing cultural artworks that are in the public domain.

As of January 2025, the portal contains almost 200 thousand works, of which over 174 thousand are in text format, while about 15 thousand are in other formats (images, sounds and videos). The majority of works are in Portuguese, though not all; for example, it contains many works in English contributed from Project Gutenberg. Literary works are available in PDF format and include contributions from a multitude of sources: different Brazilian universities (and their respective virtual libraries), international organizations such as UNESCO, and the work of volunteers and similar organizations.

Although it focuses on works by Brazilian authors and in Portuguese, it accepts collaborations in all languages, provided that they are in the public domain. In order to facilitate the work of volunteers and prospective contributors, the website hosts a list of notable Brazilian authors with works under the public domain at the time it was prepared, in 2003, made by the National Library of Brazil.

== See also ==
- Copyright law of Brazil
- Internet Archive
