= Holger Hentschel =

German politician (born 1985)

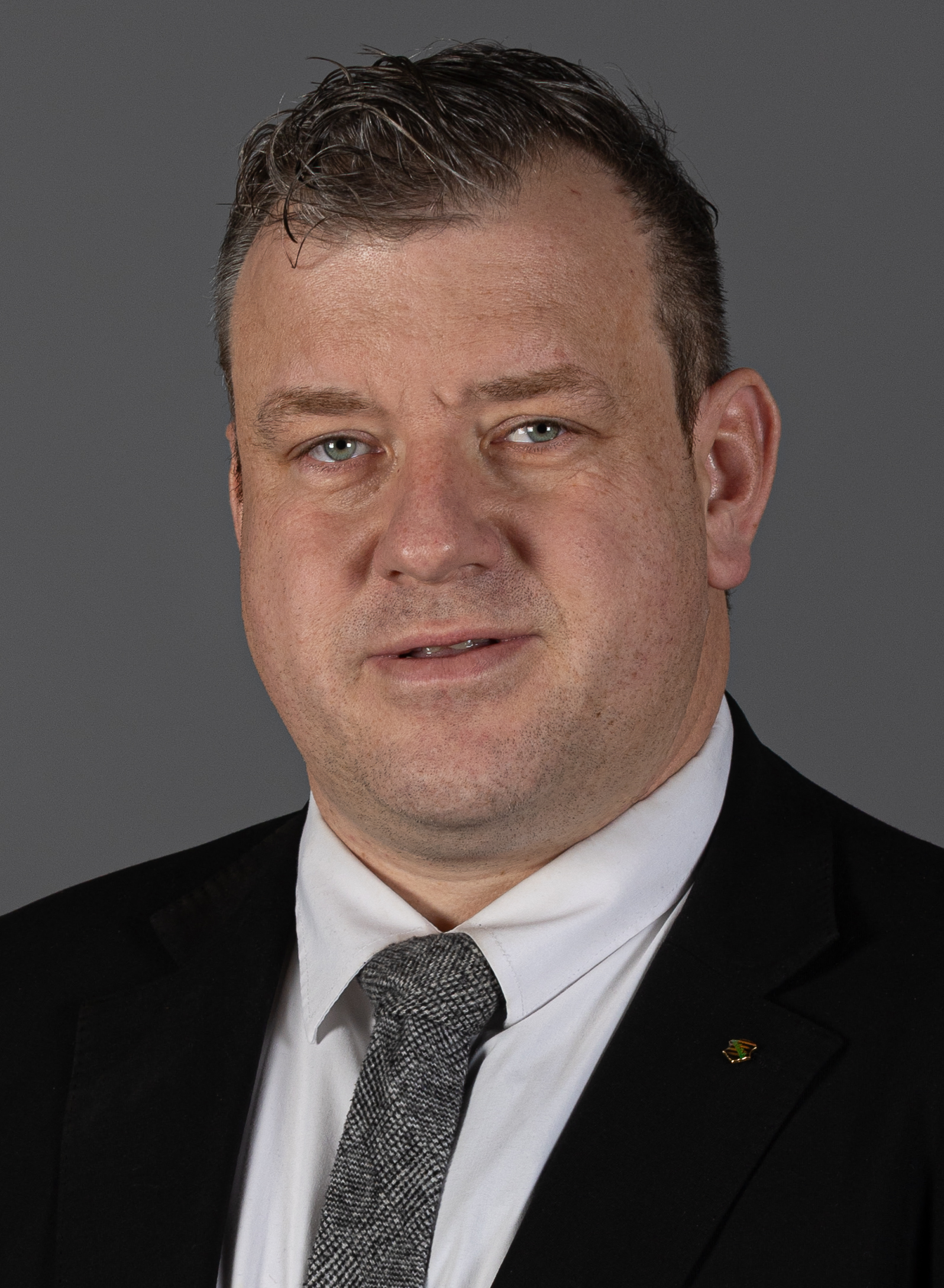
- Hentschel in 2025

Member of the Landtag of Saxony
- Incumbent
- Assumed office 1 October 2019

Personal details
- Born: 1985 (age 40–41)
- Party: Alternative for Germany

Holger Hentschel (born 1985) is a German politician serving as a member of the Landtag of Saxony since 2019. From 2014 to 2020, he was a city councillor of Leipzig. From 2017 to 2019, he served as chief of staff to Christoph Neumann.
