= Maureen Bisilliat =

British Brazilian photographer

Sheila Maureen Bisilliat (born February 16, 1931) is a Brazilian photographer.

== Early life ==
She was born in Englefield Green, Surrey, daughter of the painter Sheila Brannigan (1914–1994) and a diplomat. She studied painting with André Lhote in Paris, in 1955, and at New York's Art Students League with Morris Kantor in 1957.

She came to Brazil for the first time in 1952, establishing herself in 1957, in the city of São Paulo. In her own words, "Brazil was a search for roots which I did not have as a child. I was born in England, yes, but I lived in many places. My father was a diplomat, which forced me to live a sort of a chameleonic life. Fate tied me to Brazil. It was a willfull stay."

From 1962, she abandoned painting and began to dedicate herself to photography. She worked as a photojournalist for Editora Abril, between 1964 and 1972 for the magazines Quatro Rodas and especially prominent in the defunct Realidade.

Together with her second husband, the Frenchman Jacques Bisilliat, and the architect Antônio Marcos Silva, she founded the O Bode folk art gallery in 1972 (until 1992). During this period, she travelled through Brazil in search of works by popular artists and craftsmen, to build the gallery's collection. In 1988, at the request of the anthropologist Darcy Ribeiro, Maureen, Jacques and Antônio Marcos were invited to work on the formation of the Latin American popular art collection of the Fundação Memorial da América Latina in São Paulo. They subsequently traveled through Mexico, Guatemala, Ecuador, Peru and Paraguay, collecting pieces for the permanent collection of the Memorial's Creativity Pavilion, for which Maureen has since become a curator.

Maureen Bisilliat was given a Guggenheim Fellowship in 1970, and she received grants from the National Council for Scientific and Technological Development (1981–1987), the São Paulo Research Foundation (1984–1987) and the Japan Foundation (1987).

Since the 1980s, she has devoted herself to video work, notably the Xingu/Terra feature documentary, shot with Lúcio Kodato, in the Mehinako village in the Upper Xingu.

In December 2003, her complete photographic work was incorporated into the Moreira Salles Institute's photographic collection. It comprises more than 16,000 images, including prints, black and white negatives in 35 mm and 6 cm x 6 cm and color slides.

In 17 March 2010, she was awarded the Order of Ipiranga by the São Paulo state government.

== Published books ==
She published a number of photography books inspired by the work of Brazilian writers:

- A João Guimarães Rosa. São Paulo: Gráficos Brunner, 1969.
- A Visita, 1977; inspired by the homonymous poem by Carlos Drummond de Andrade.
- Sertões, Luz e Trevas. São Paulo: co-edição Editora Raízes e Rhodia, 1982; inspired by Euclides da Cunha's Os Sertões).
- O Cão sem Plumas. Rio de Janeiro: Editora Nova Fronteira, 1983; inspired by the poem of same name by João Cabral de Melo Neto.
- Chorinho Doce. 1995; with poems by Adélia Prado.
- Bahia Amada Amado. São Paulo: Empresa das Artes, 1996; with texts by Jorge Amado.

Other notable books by her are:

- Xingu: Detalhes de Uma Cultura . São Paulo: Editora Raízes, 1978.
- Xingu: Território Tribal. London: William Collins & Sons, 1979.
- Terras do Rio São Francisco. São Paulo: Editora Raízes/Beemge, 1985.

== Exhibitions ==
- 1965 – Museu de Arte de São Paulo Assis Chateaubriand
- 1975 – Xingu/Terra, solo show at 13th São Paulo Art Biennial
- 1979 – Xingu/Terra, American Museum of Natural History, New York City
- 1985 – O Turista Aprendiz, 18th São Paulo Art Biennial, solo show of the photographic essay inspired by the book by Mário de Andrade
- 1987 – O Turista Aprendiz, solo show at Salon de la Photographie, Paris, France
- 1989 – Teatro do Presídio, solo show at 20th São Paulo Art Biennial, Seção de Teatro
- 2010 – Galeria Fiesp, São Paulo
- 2011 – Museu Oscar Niemeyer, Curitiba, Brazil

== Group exhibitions ==
- 1971 – Fotógrafos de São Paulo, Museu de Arte Contemporânea da Universidade de São Paulo
- 1985 – 1ª Quadrienal de Fotografia, Museu de Arte Moderna de São Paulo
- 1992 – Brasilien: Entdeckung und Selbstentdeckung, Kunsthaus Zürich, Zürich, Switzerland
- 1995 – Fotografia Brasileira Contemporânea. Centro Cultural Banco do Brasil, Rio de Janeiro
- 1998 – Amazônicas. Itaú Cultural, São Paulo
- 1999 – Brasilianische Fotografie, Kunstmuseum Wolfsburg, Germany
- 2003 – Labirintos e Identidades: a Fotografia no Brasil de 1945 a 1998, Maria Antônia University Center, São Paulo
- 2004 – Brasileiro Brasileiros, Museu Afro-Brasil, São Paulo
- 2004 – São Paulo 450 Anos: a imagem e a memória da cidade no acervo do Instituto Moreira Salles, Centro Cultural Fiesp, São Paulo

== Awards ==
In 1987, Maureen Bisilliat received the Best Photographer Award from the São Paulo Association of Art Critics.
