= Alberto Henschel =

German-Brazilian photographer (1827–1882)

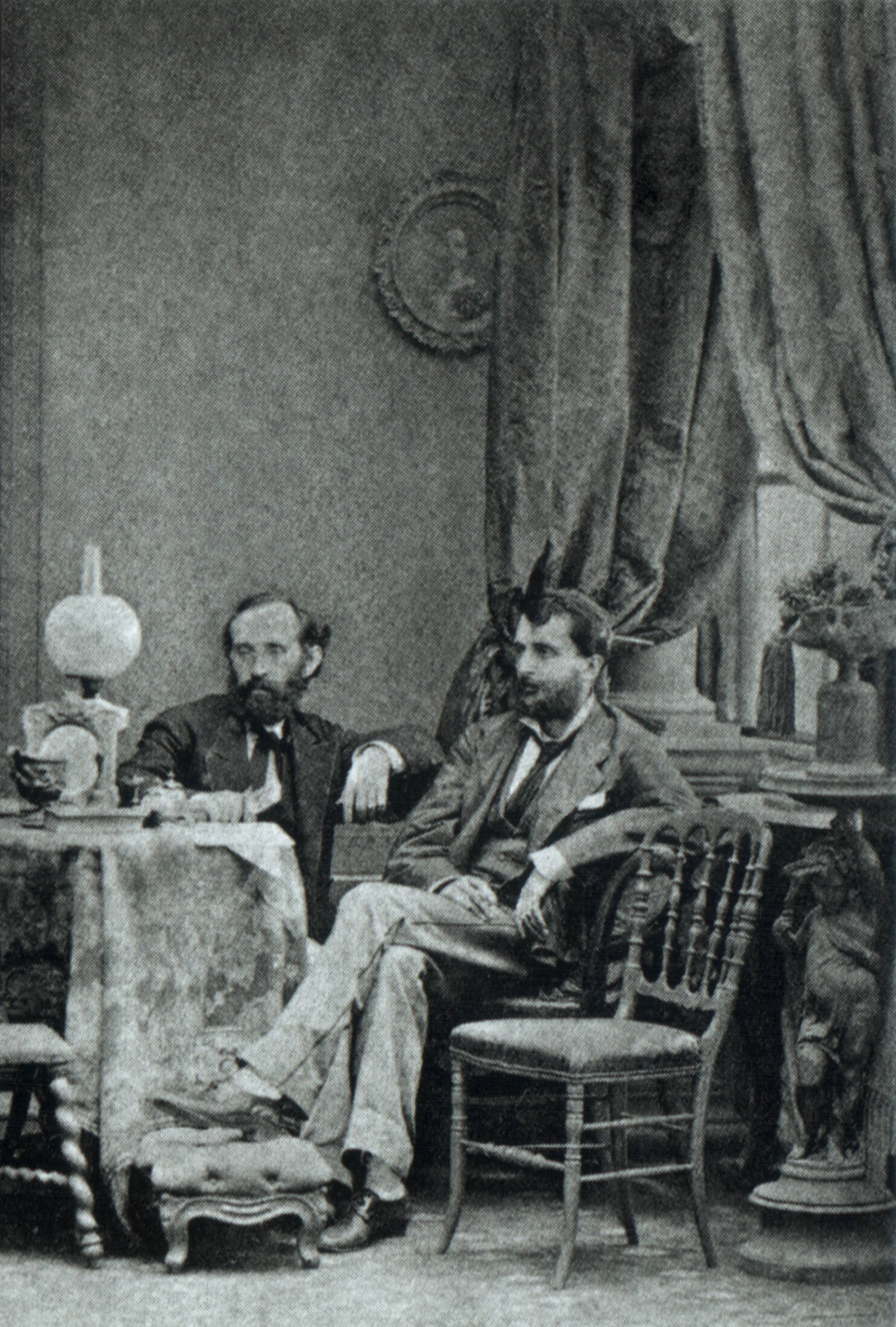
- The photographers Alberto Henschel (right) and Constantino Barza in 1870
- Born: 13 June 1827; Berlin, Germany
- Died: 30 June 1882 (aged 55); Rio de Janeiro,^{[a]} Brazil
- Occupations: Businessman, photographer
- Title: Photographo da Casa Imperial (Photographer of the Imperial House)

Alberto Henschel (13 June 1827 – 30 June 1882) was a German-born Brazilian photographer born in Berlin. Considered the hardest-working photographer and businessman in 19th-century Brazil, with offices in Pernambuco, Bahia, Rio de Janeiro, and São Paulo, Henschel was also responsible for the presence of other professional photographers in the country, including his compatriot Karl Ernst Papf—with whom he later worked.

Henschel became known for making pictorial representations of Rio de Janeiro as a landscape photographer and for being an excellent portraitist. He earned the title of Photographo da Casa Imperial (Photographer of the Royal House), allowing him to photograph the everyday life of the Brazilian monarchy during the Reign of Pedro II, even photographing the emperor Dom Pedro II and his family. This title would give his photographs increased recognition and raise their price.

But his principal contribution to the history of Brazilian photography is his photographic record of the different social classes in Brazil in the 19th century: portraits, usually in the carte de visite format, taken of the nobility, of rich tradesmen, of the middle-class, and of black people, either slaves or free, in a period before the Lei Áurea.

== Antecedents ==
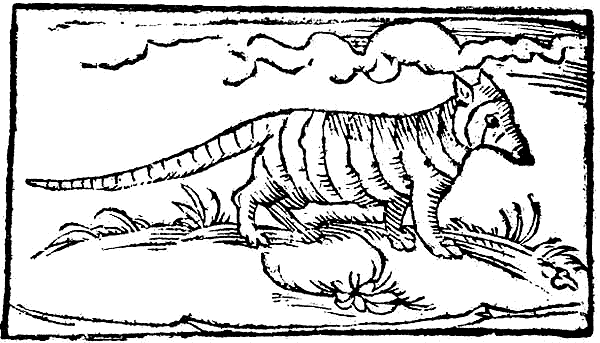
Xylography of an armadillo, one of the most exotic animals seen by Hans Staden in Brazil (1557)

As soon as the first world maps showing Brazil were printed in the Renaissance era of Albrecht Dürer, the recently discovered country aroused the interest of the German public. Among the first attractions were the enthusiastic descriptions and illustrations of the Indians, the exotic landscapes, the abundance of wild animals and the new species of plants first conveyed in the works of Hans Staden. This was followed by the writings of adventurers and scientists such as Johann Baptist Emanuel Pohl, author of Viagem no Interior do Brasil, Empreendida nos Anos de 1817 a 1821 e Publicada por Ordem de Sua Majestade o Imperador da Áustria Francisco Primeiro (Voyage in the Interior of Brazil. Launched in the Years of 1817 to 1821 and Published by the Order of His Majesty the Emperor of Austria Franscisco First), in which he describes his journey through the country with wonder and enthusiasm, his words accompanied by luxuriant illustrations. About Rio de Janeiro, Pohl wrote:

If some place in the New World deserves, for its location and natural conditions, to become one day a theater of big events, a center of civilization and culture, an emporium of worldwide commerce, it is, in my opinion, Rio de Janeiro. I cannot, here, repress this observation. Willingly hovers the fantasy on the future of such charming country, that is at present little developed and, so to speak, does not have a past.
—Johann Emmanuel Pohl

Certainly these narrations and illustrations were the principal attractions for those German photographers of the 19th century that moved to Brazil, such as Revert Henrique Klumb, Augusto Stahl, Karl Ernst Papf, and Alberto Henschel.

== Life ==
=== In Germany ===
Alberto Henschel was born 13 June 1827 in Berlin to Moritz and Helene Henschel. Moritz and his brothers August, Friedrich, and Wilhelm, of Jewish origin, had arrived in Berlin around 1806. They were recognized as engravers and signed their works as the Henschel Brothers. There are no records of Alberto Henschel's person or professional life in the Kingdom of Prussia or his reasons for emigrating to Brazil.

It has been assumed that Alberto Henschel also met the photographer Francisco Benque while still in Germany, with whom he had a successful, but short-lived, relationship in Brazil.

=== In Brazil ===
==== 1860s ====
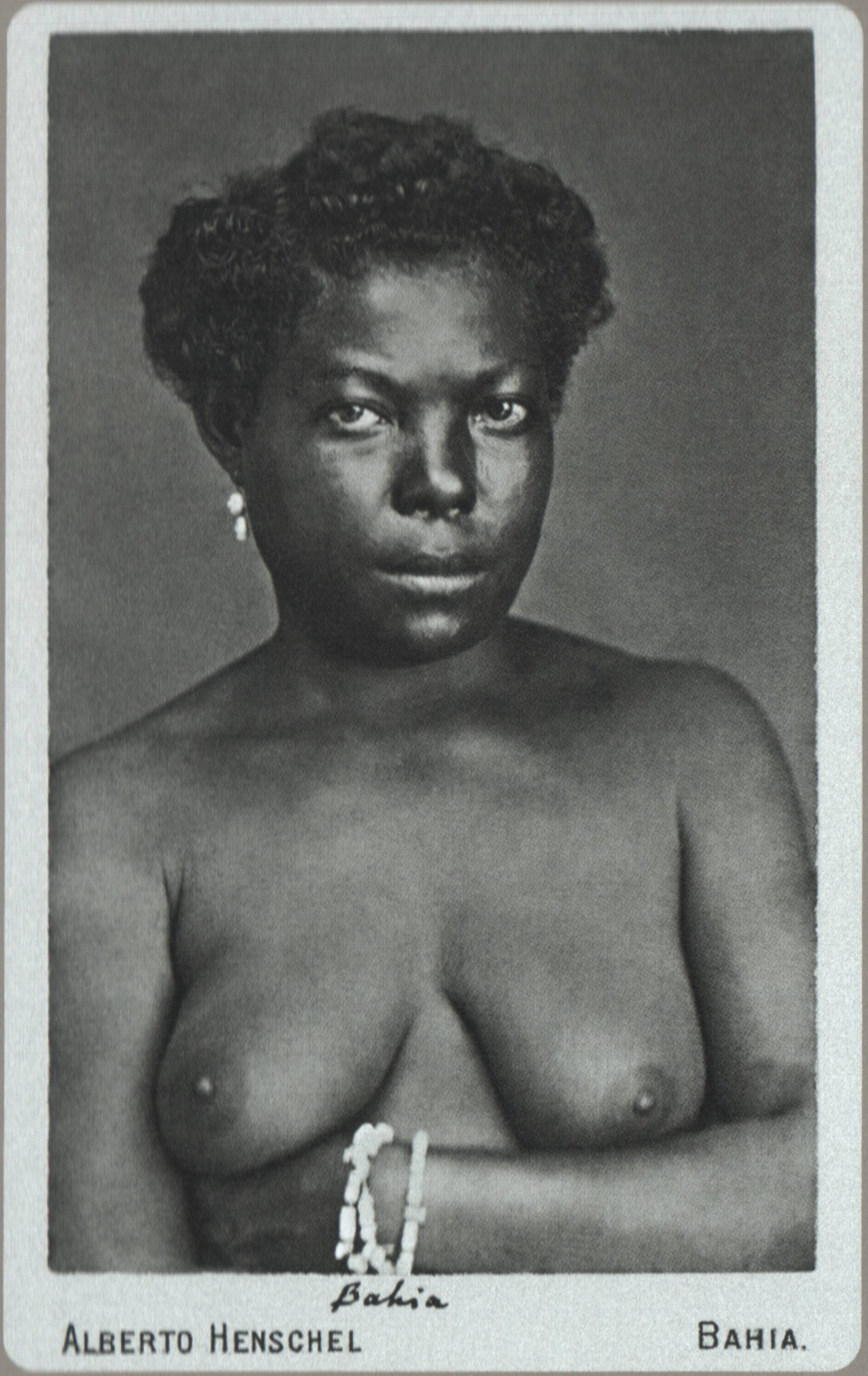
Nude of young Black girl. Salvador, province of Bahia (1869)

Henschel and his associate Karl Heinrich Gutzlaff disembarked in Recife in May 1866, intending to create a photographic studio on Imperador street, number 38. Initially named Alberto Henschel & Cia, the studio became Photographia Allemã (German Photography), next changing to a new address on the Matriz de Santo Antônio square, number 2. Because he was able to build up his business quickly when he came, it is assumed that Henschel was already an experienced photographer and intended to build a promising business in photography in this new market that was still so little explored.

In 1867, Henschel separated from Gutzlaff and returned to Germany, where he updated his technique and acquired new equipment for his atelier of photography. He returned to Brazil in the same year, opening another establishment with the same company name in the city of Salvador, on Piedade street, number 16. By opening three establishments in only two years, Henschel was thought of as the most audacious and sagacious photographic businessman in 19th century Brazil.

By the end of the 1860s, Henschel's houses of Recife and Salvador were already making portraits of people of African origin, slaves and free, differing from other photographers by portraying them freely and with dignity as people and not as objects.

==== 1870s ====
In 1870, Henschel opened another subsidiary of his atelier, this time in Rio de Janeiro, on Ourives street (nowadays Miguel Couto street, number 40). It was in Rio, capital of the Empire, where he started his prosperous partnership with Francisco Benque. With the name of Henschel & Benque, it specialized in the production and marketing of portraits, landscapes, and the photopaintings made by Karl Ernst Papf, whose presence in Brazil was due to Henschel. There are no records dating when the relationship with Benque crumbled; it is probable that their association remained until 1880.

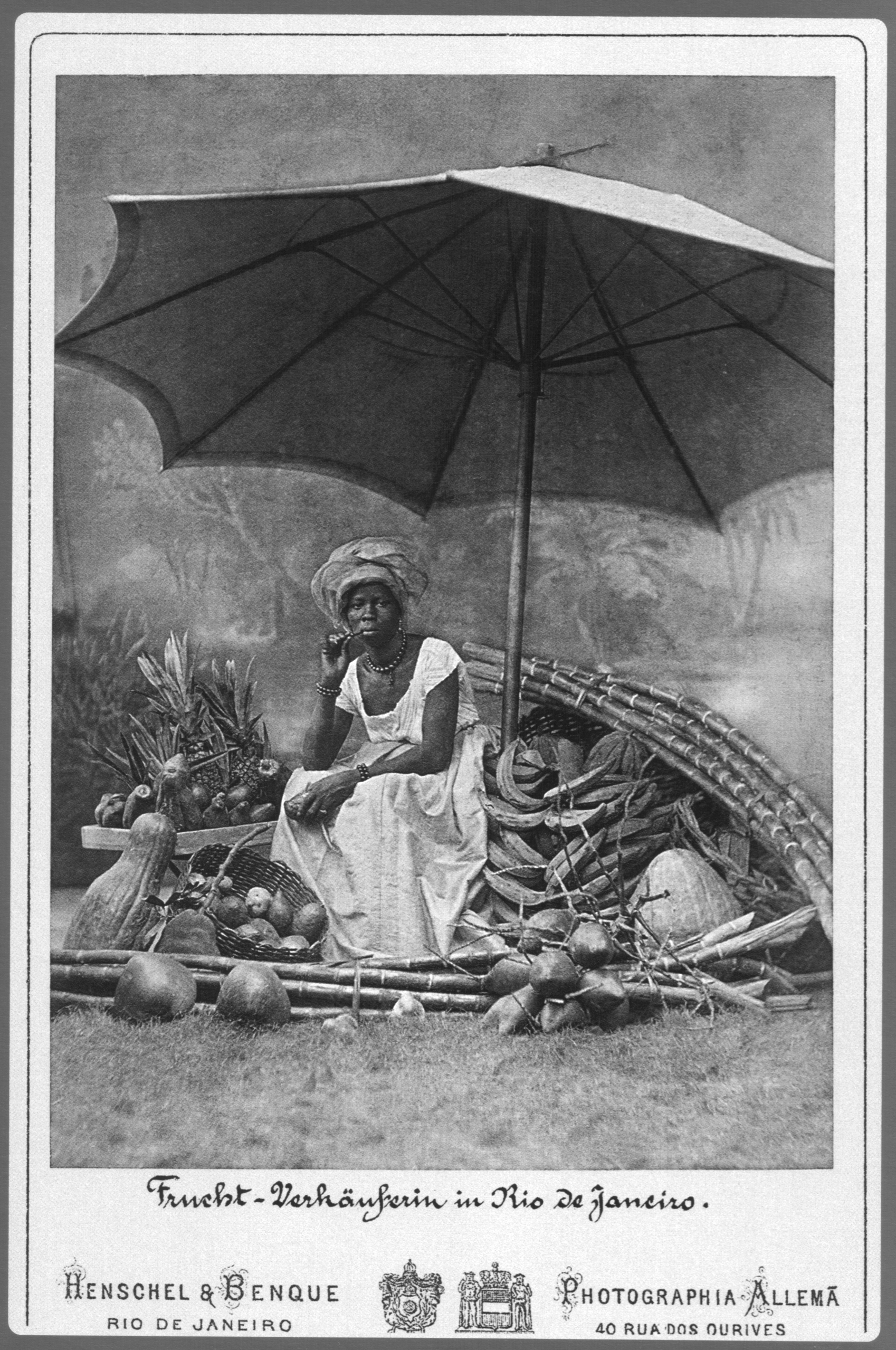
Black saleswoman of fruits. Rio de Janeiro (1870)

Because of the quality of his work and his success in the Court, Henschel received the title of Photographo da Casa Imperial (Photographer of the Royal House) on 7 September 1874, together with Benque, which would give his photographs increased recognition and raise their price. The historian photographer Gilberto Ferrez describes the quality and importance of Henschel as follows:

Henschel photographed Rio and its surroundings [...]. He made landscapes, but above all he was a distinguished portraitist. There is almost no family album where no portraits of grandparents were done by Alberto Henschel.

— —Gilberto Ferrez

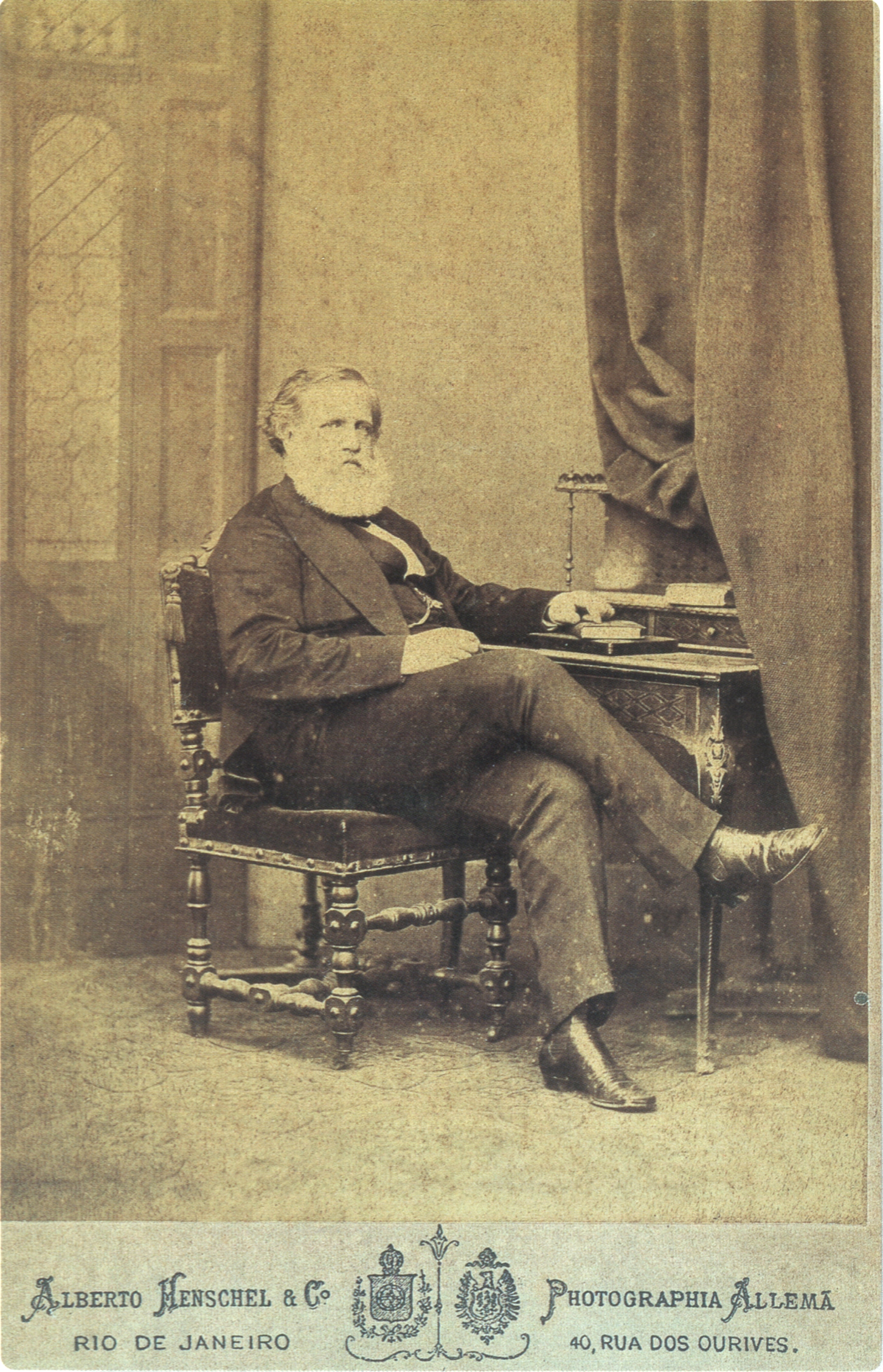
Photo of Dom Pedro II. Rio de Janeiro (1875)

Henschel participated in many exhibitions of photographs, standing out in the exposition of the Imperial Academy of Fine Arts in 1872 and 1875, for which he received the Gold Medal in the first edition. He also participated in the IV National Exposition and the Universal Exposition of Vienna, in Austria, where he received the Merit Medal.

==== 1880s ====
On 1 February 1882,^{[b]} Henschel inaugurated another establishment, this time in the capital of the province of São Paulo. He gave it the name Photographia Imperial (Imperial Photography) because the name Photographia Allemã had already been used since 1875 by the atelier of the photographer Carlos Hoenen. His arrival in São Paulo was considered important because, besides being holder of the prestigious title of Photographo da Casa Imperial, he came directly from the Court. The newspaper A Província de São Paulo (currently O Estado de S. Paulo), while describing with minimal details the new atelier in its inaugural day edition, related the enthusiasm with which Henschel was received by the residents of São Paulo.

Henschel died in Rio de Janeiro that same year,^{[a]} only some months after establishing himself in São Paulo. However, his companies, under the command of other businessmen, continued to strategically use his name for many years, taking advantage of the great prestige that the mark "Henschel" had acquired.

== Technique ==
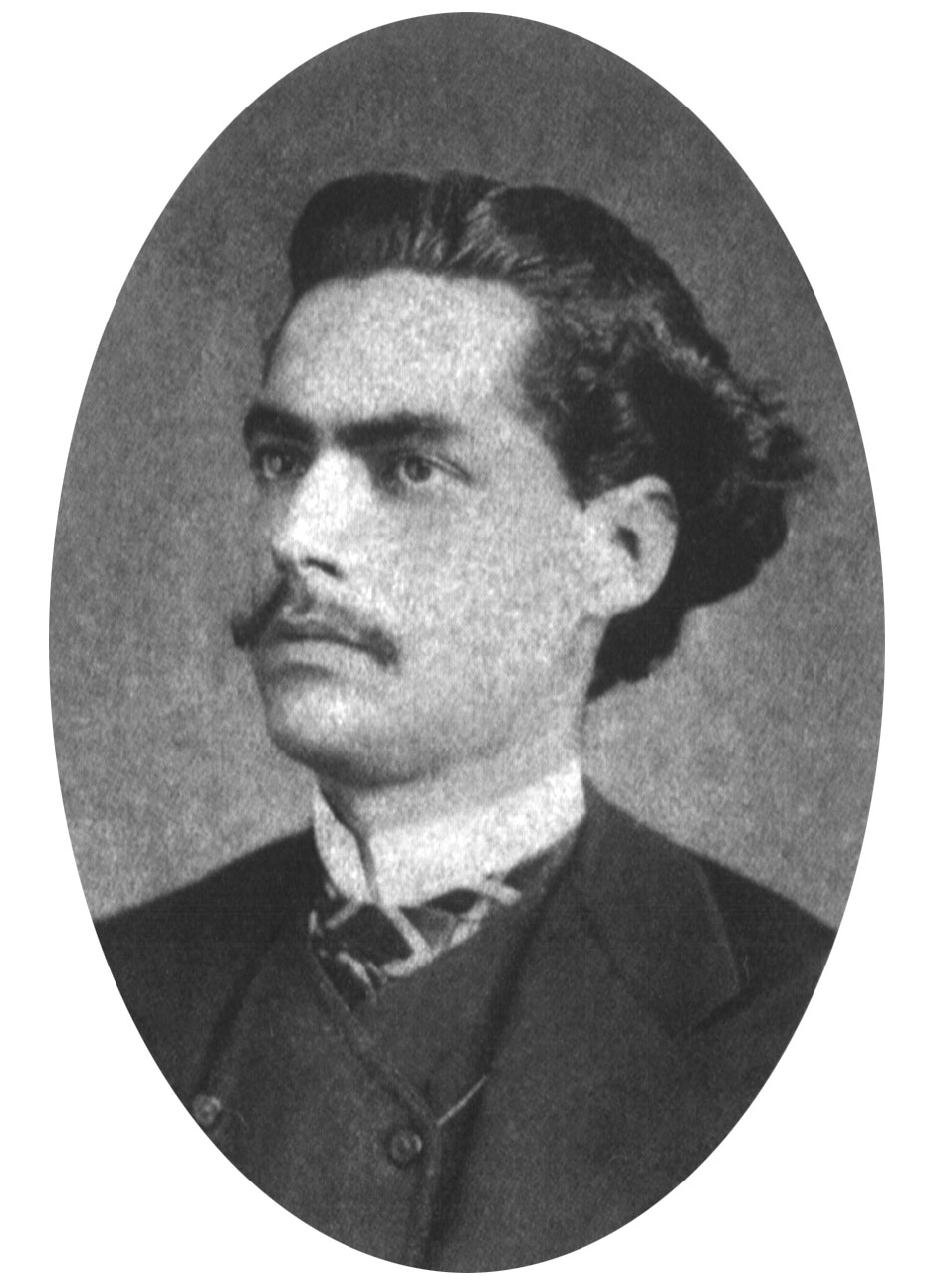
Portrait of Castro Alves (1870)

Henschel was considered the hardest-working photographer and businessman in 19th-century Brazil. He always remained up-to-date with the latest techniques on the photography market. By the time the aesthetic format of photography carte de visite became popular, Henschel was already dominating this technique which he used frequently in his establishments.

His studios possessed the latest equipment appropriate for the instantaneous portraits of children who, never still, were the headaches of the photographers. In his announcement in the Novo Almanach de São Paulo para o Anno de 1883 (New Almanac of São Paulo for the Year of 1883), Henschel advertised:

This establishment just received from Europe the negatives for the new process of instantaneous photographies that have so much success there. Through these chichets one can obtain a more perfect portrait of a moving child, of nervous people... The public is invited to come examine in the establishment some portraits obtained by the new process.

The new process referred to in the announcement was the use of dry slabs of transparent gelatin, used as an adhesive layer for the fixation of the silver salts over the paper.

He photographed all the different social classes of Brazil in the 19th century. Besides the Brazilian monarchy and black people, he also photographed the nobility, the rich tradesmen and their families, and the white middle-class.

== Footnotes ==
- Some biographies state that he died in São Paulo.
- There are biographical records that indicate the year of 1881 instead of 1882.
