= Revert Henrique Klumb =

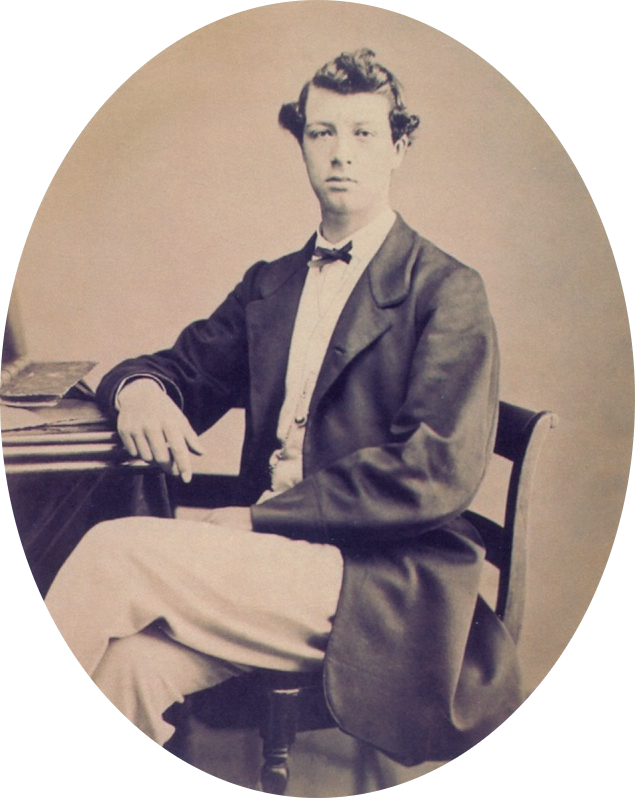
Revert Henrique Klumb, 1861

Revert Henrique Klumb (1830, Germany – 1886, unknown) was a German-Brazilian photographer who operated in Brazil in the 19th century. Probably the introducer of the stereoscopic photography in the country, Klumb obtained the title of Photographo da Casa Imperial (Photographer of the Imperial House) in Rio de Janeiro. He was the author of the photography book Doze Horas em Diligência. Guia do Viajante de Petrópolis a Juiz de Fora (Twelve Hours in Expedition. Guide of the Traveler from Petrópolis to Juiz de Fora), that became one of the pioneers of the edition of photography books in Brazil.
