= Wilhelm Henschel =

German-Jewish artist

Wilhelm Henschel (March 15, 1785 – June 27, 1865) was a German-Jewish artist especially known for his drawings, and as a member of the artistic team the Brothers Henschel (Gebrüder Henschel), together with his three brothers, Friedrich (1781-1837), August (1782-1828) und Moritz (1785-1862). Active in Berlin and in their hometown, Breslau (Wrocław), the brothers were known for drawings, pastels, engravings, miniature paintings, and lithographs.

== Biography ==
Wilhelm and his brothers were born of a Jewish family, in Trachenberg (Żmigród), and grew up in Breslau, then in Prussian Silesia. Their father, Hirsch Henschel, was a merchant; their uncle (Hirsch's older brother) Elias Henschel (1755-1839) was a prominent physician. In Breslau the brothers attended the new Jewish secular school (the Wilhelmschule, founded 1791), where, among other subjects, they learned drawing.

The brothers moved to Berlin around 1804 to pursue their art; in that year Wilhelm Henschel exhibited for the first time at the Prussian Academy of Arts. In 1806 all four brothers had individual entries in the Academy exhibition; and in 1810 they collectively participated with some ten works, including pastels and engravings.

The Henschel brothers' oeuvre focused on portraits (including memorial portraiture), theater and ballet performances, and cityscapes. Besides producing engravings, they were among the first in Berlin to experiment with the new printing technique of lithography.

Between 1809 and 1818 they published a series of engravings depicting the popular German actor August Wilhelm Iffland, in scenes from plays, under the title Ifflands mimische Darstellungen für Schauspieler und Zeichner, in 20 issues, of six plates each. The drawings on which the works were based were mainly by Wilhelm Henschel, while August Henschel was responsible for the engravings. The drawings were made from life during performances Iffland gave at Prussia's royal national theater (Königliches Nationaltheater) between 1808 and 1811, in roles such as King Lear, Shylock, and Wilhelm Tell (in the play by Schiller); each depicted a particular scene and was captioned with lines from the play.

In an age in which the theater held a central place in German culture, the Henschel brothers conceived of these works as an aid to actors, artists, and the educated public for grasping the art of expression; and believed that the best means of engaging the intellect was through a combination of text and image. The eminent Johann Wolfgang von Goethe, who was familiar with the Henschels' work, took note of the Iffland publication in his periodical Über Kunst und Altertum, remarking favorably on the skill with which they captured Iffland's expressions and gestures.

In 1812 the Prussian Academy of Arts bestowed upon Wilhelm Henschel and his brother August the title “Akademische Künstler” (academic artist), although, as Jews, they were never members of the academy.

In 1819, in honor of Goethe's 70th birthday, the Henschel brothers began work on a series of pictures depicting scenes from the poet's life, based on episodes he recounts in the first volume of his autobiography (Aus meinem Leben: Dichtung und Wahrheit). They dedicated the work to the Prussian king, Friedrich Wilhelm III, and sent the king a first printing of an initial set, in May 1819; the series was finally completed and published in its entirety as Scenen aus Goethe's Leben (Scenes from Goethe's life) in 1821.

The Henschel brothers produced portraits of many personalities of Berlin of their times, including Johann Gottlieb Fichte, Wilhelm von Humboldt, August von Kotzebue, and Julius von Voss. They produced numerous portraits for the king and his family, including memorial portraits following the death of Queen Luise, in 1810.

When August Henschel died in 1828, Wilhelm returned to his home city of Breslau; his two other brothers, Friedrich and Moritz, had already done so at an earlier point, even as they had all continued to work as an artistic team.

== Selected Works by the Brothers Henschel ==
- Ifflands mimische Darstellungen für Schauspieler und Zeichner: Während der Vorstellung gezeichnet zu Berlin in den Jahren 1808 bis 1811. Berlin, 1811-1818
- Begebenheiten aus dem heiligen Kriege. Berlin, circa 1813. A series of portraits related to the German campaign against Napoleon (War of Liberation)
- Scenen aus Goethe's Leben: bildlich dargestellt; zum ersten Bande 'Aus meinem Leben: Dichtung und Wahrheit'; ein Geschenk für die deutsche Jugend. Berlin/Breslau, 1821
