= Henschel Quartet =

German string quartet

The Henschel Quartet is a German string quartet comprising the Henschel siblings; Christoph and Markus (violinists), Monika (viola) and Mathias Beyer-Karlshøj (cellist), who joined them in 1994. Brother Markus left the quartet in 2010, and was succeeded by Daniel Bell in 2012. In 2016–2018 Catalin Desaga took the place of the second violin. Today the Quartet consists of following members: Christoph Henschel and Teresa La Cour (violinists), Monika Henschel (viola) and Mathias Beyer-Karlshøj (cello).

== Musical training ==
Christoph, Markus and Monika Henschel studied with Felix Andrievsky, a graduate of the Moscow Violin School of playing (Yampolsky and Yankelevich) and gained distinction in their diplomas from the Royal College of Music, in London. Mathias Beyer-Karlshøj studied with the Swedish cellist Thorleif Thedeen and gained a distinction in 1996, at the end of his studies at the Royal Danish Academy of Music in Copenhagen.

An intensive musical experience was gained through their contact with Sergiu Celibidache and with Prof. Franz Beyer from the Musikhochschule in Munich. The London Master Classes and classes at the Musikhochschule in Cologne, Germany with the Amadeus Quartet had a determining influence on the musical development and direction of the ensemble. Similarly, regular courses with members of the La Salle Quartet and Alban Berg Quartet had a profound influence on the Henschel Quartet. The Henschel Quartet were quartet in residence at both the Aldeburgh Festival (1994) and at the Tanglewood Music Festival (1995/1996). At the latter, they were coached by musicians Louis Krasner and Eugene Lehner, who had worked with composers such as Béla Bartók and Arnold Schoenberg, and who gave the quartet unique insights into the works of the Second Viennese School.

== Repertoire and Première performances ==
The Henschel Quartet's repertoire encompasses more than 200 works from the classical and romantic to 20th century and contemporary music.

The quartet has given many première performances of works of contemporary composers from Günter Bialas to Manfred Trojahn and played premières of recently discovered works of famous past composers:

- 2006 concert première of Sergiu Celibidache’s Taschengarten at the Herkulessaal in Munich with the Munich Philharmonic Youth Orchestra.
- 2007 concert première of Carl Orff’s string quartet movement at the Carl Orff Zentrum, Munich.
- 2008 concert première of Max Bruch’s string quintet in Eb (composed in 1918) at the Wigmore Hall in London.

== Awards and achievements ==
- In 1995 the Henschel Quartet were prize-winners of 5 prizes at international string quartet competitions in Evian, Banff and Salzburg for the best interpretation of works ranging from Mozart to contemporary composers. Also, that same year, the quartet made their first Japanese tour, together with members of the Amadeus Quartet as the Ensemble Amadeus.
- In 1996 the quartet gained 1st prize and the gold medal in the international string quartet competition in Osaka.
- Their International success in 2001, led to the quartet being a stand-in for the Juilliard String Quartet at London's Wigmore Hall.
- In 2002 the Henschel Quartet played their first Beethoven complete cycle of 6 evenings in Copenhagen/Tivoli, followed by many other cycles, i.a. at Suntory Hall Tokyo.
- In 2006 the quartet became Germany's cultural ambassadors for the EU during the jubilee celebrations of the Europalia Festival in Brussels.
- In April 2007 the Henschel Quartet were on the front cover and an article dedicated to them in the Strad magazine. Also in the same year, they were successfully recognised as Henle Artists by the music publishers G Henle.
- In 2015 the Henschel Quartet was awarded the Orlando prize by the Dubrovnik Festival.

The Henschel Quartet has worked for the German Music Council and the Siemens Arts Programme and regularly takes part in their programmes at the Goethe Institutes abroad.

The quartet belongs to the select group of guest ensembles who regularly play at the Spanish royal palace in Madrid and perform concerts on the 4 Stradivarius instruments that belong to the palace.

== CD Recordings ==
The Henschel Quartet have received noteworthy praise, nominations and awards for their CD recordings of the classical and romantic repertoire with SonyBMG, EMI and Deutsche Grammophon, including:

- Prize for the best German recording
- MIDEM Cannes
- CD of the year nmz
- The Henschels' box-set of the complete string quartets of Felix Mendelssohn was ranked no.1 in the HMV charts in Japan for the longest running time during 1996 and 1997.

Since 2007, the quartet has performed 20th century works and made premières recordings for the newly formed CD label NEOS.

== Teaching commitments/engagements ==
Since 1998 the Henschel Quartet has given regular masterclasses at universities and music departments such as MIT, Boston, Dartington College of Arts and Royal Northern College of Music Manchester, England, the University of Melbourne, Australia, and the Tōkyō Geijutsu Daigaku University, Japan.

Moreover, the Henschel Quartet is engaged in exchanges with other ensembles and strives to reach new levels of artistic excellence in chamber music. Together with Franz Preuschoff as the official organiser, the quartet has, since 1997, invited a new colleague ensemble to perform each year in their string festival at the Kloster Seligenstadt.

Since its beginning, the quartet has committed itself to supporting children and young people. The non-profit organisation “Friends of the Henschel Quartet for the promotion of chamber music” has been dedicating itself, since 2001 not only to the support of youth, but also to the expansion of the chamber music scene.

As ambassadors for SOS Children's Villages Association, the Henschel Quartet organises workshops and concerts for children and youth, and have made a CD Recording in aid of the SOS children's villages.
