= Imperial Mausoleum =

Mausoleum in Brazil

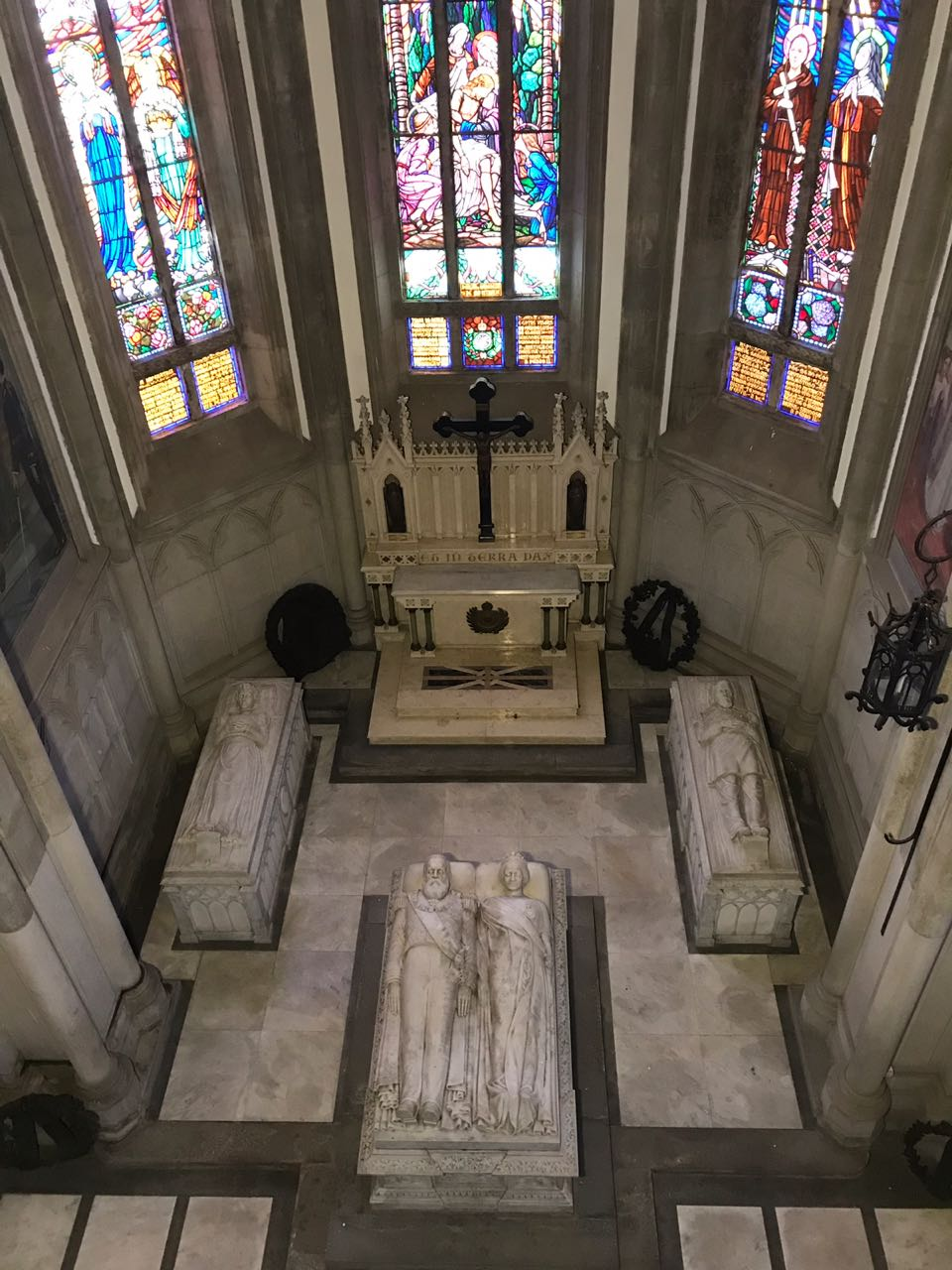

Religion
- Region: Rio de Janeiro

Location
- Location: Cathedral of Saint Peter of Alcantara, Petrópolis
- Country: Brazil
- Interactive map of Imperial Mausoleum
- Coordinates: 22°30′20″S 43°10′45″W

Architecture
- Style: Neo-Gothic
- Completed: 1939

The Imperial Mausoleum, located to the right of the churchyard of the Cathedral of Saint Peter of Alcantara in Petrópolis, is the final resting place of the second Emperor of Brazil, Pedro II and his wife Teresa Cristina, as well as their daughter, Princess Isabel, and other members of the imperial family of the second reign.

== Construction ==
In Neo-Gothic style, matching the temple in which it is located, the Imperial Mausoleum is adorned with murals depicting the coronation of Dom Pedro II and his departure for exile upon the Republican coup d'état on 15 November 1889. The stained glass windows feature the imperial arms and figures of Catholic saints associated with the Brazilian imperial family, as well as poems written by Dom Pedro II during his exile.

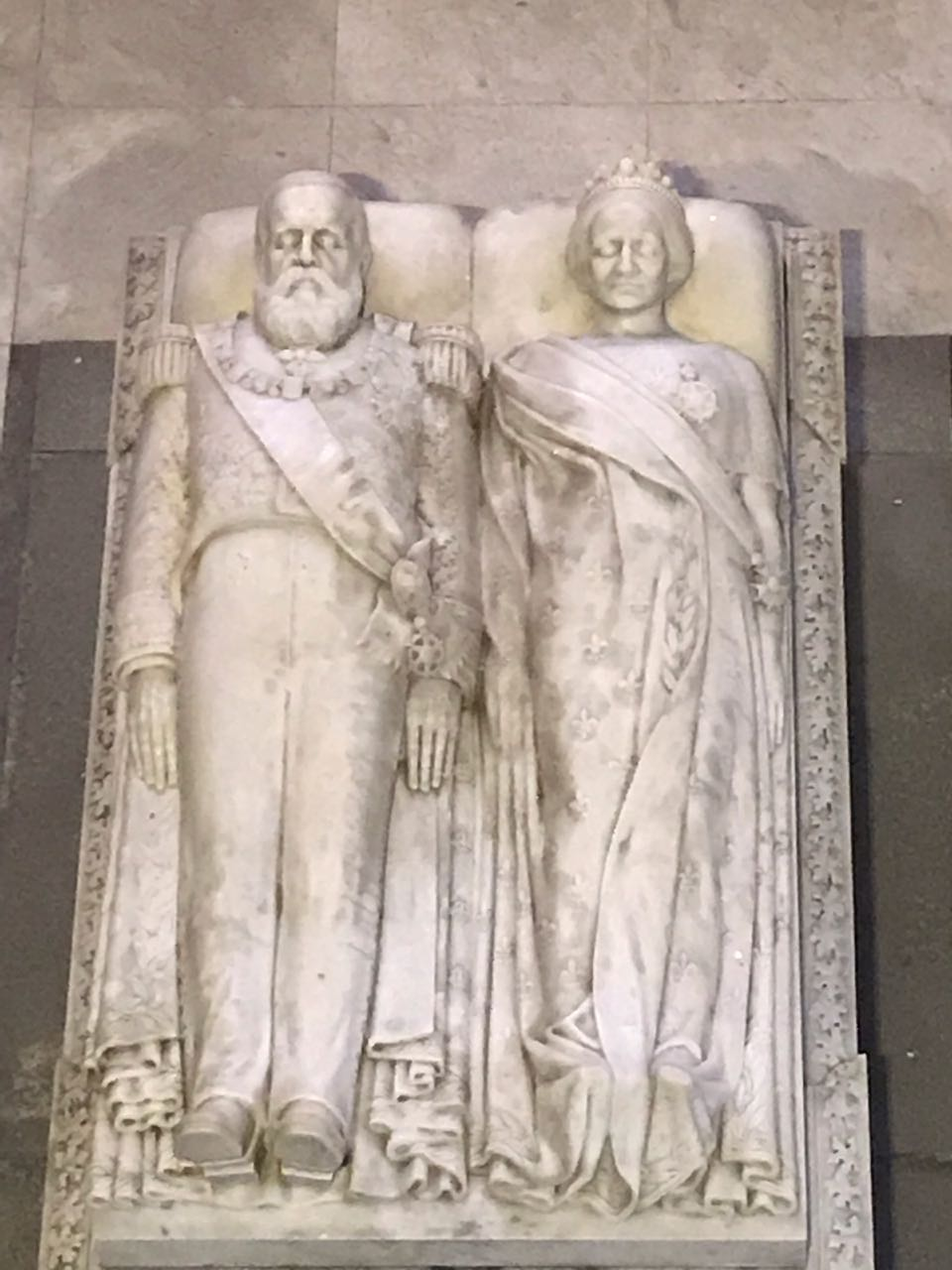
Tomb of Emperor Pedro II and Empress Teresa Cristina

The Imperial Mausoleum is one of the most popular tourist attractions in the city of Petrópolis.

== Transfer ==
The mausoleum was inaugurated by President Getúlio Vargas in 1939, with the arrival of the remains of Emperor Pedro II and Empress Teresa Cristina. They were repatriated from the Pantheon of the House of Braganza at the Monastery of São Vicente de Fora in Lisbon, Portugal in 1925, during the celebrations of the centenary of Dom Pedro II's birth; and were housed for a few years in the Church of Our Lady of Mount Carmel (the Metropolitan Cathedral of Rio de Janeiro at the time and former Imperial Chapel).

The remains of Princess Isabel and the Count of Eu were interred there in the 1970s, repatriated from the mausoleum of the House of Orléans in Dreux, France.

The last remains to be interred in the mausoleum were those of the emperors' grandson, Prince Pedro de Alcântara, and his wife, Countess Elizabeth Dobrženský von Dobrženitz, transferred from the municipal cemetery of the city in 1990.

== Burials ==
- Pedro II (1825–1891), Emperor of Brazil
- Teresa Cristina of the Two Sicilies (1822–1889), Empress consort of Brazil, wife of Pedro II
- Isabel of Braganza (1846–1921), Princess Imperial of Brazil
- Gaston of Orléans (1842–1922), Prince Imperial consort of Brazil, husband of Isabel
- Pedro de Alcântara of Orléans-Braganza (1875–1940), Prince of Grão-Pará
- Countess Elizabeth Dobrženský von Dobrženitz (1875–1951), Princess consort of Orléans-Braganza

== See also ==
- Burial places of members of the Brazilian imperial family
- Imperial Crypt and Chapel
- Exile and death of Pedro II of Brazil
- Symbols of Brazil
