= Independence Park (São Paulo) =

Park in São Paulo, Brazil

Coordinates: 23.584°S 46.610°W

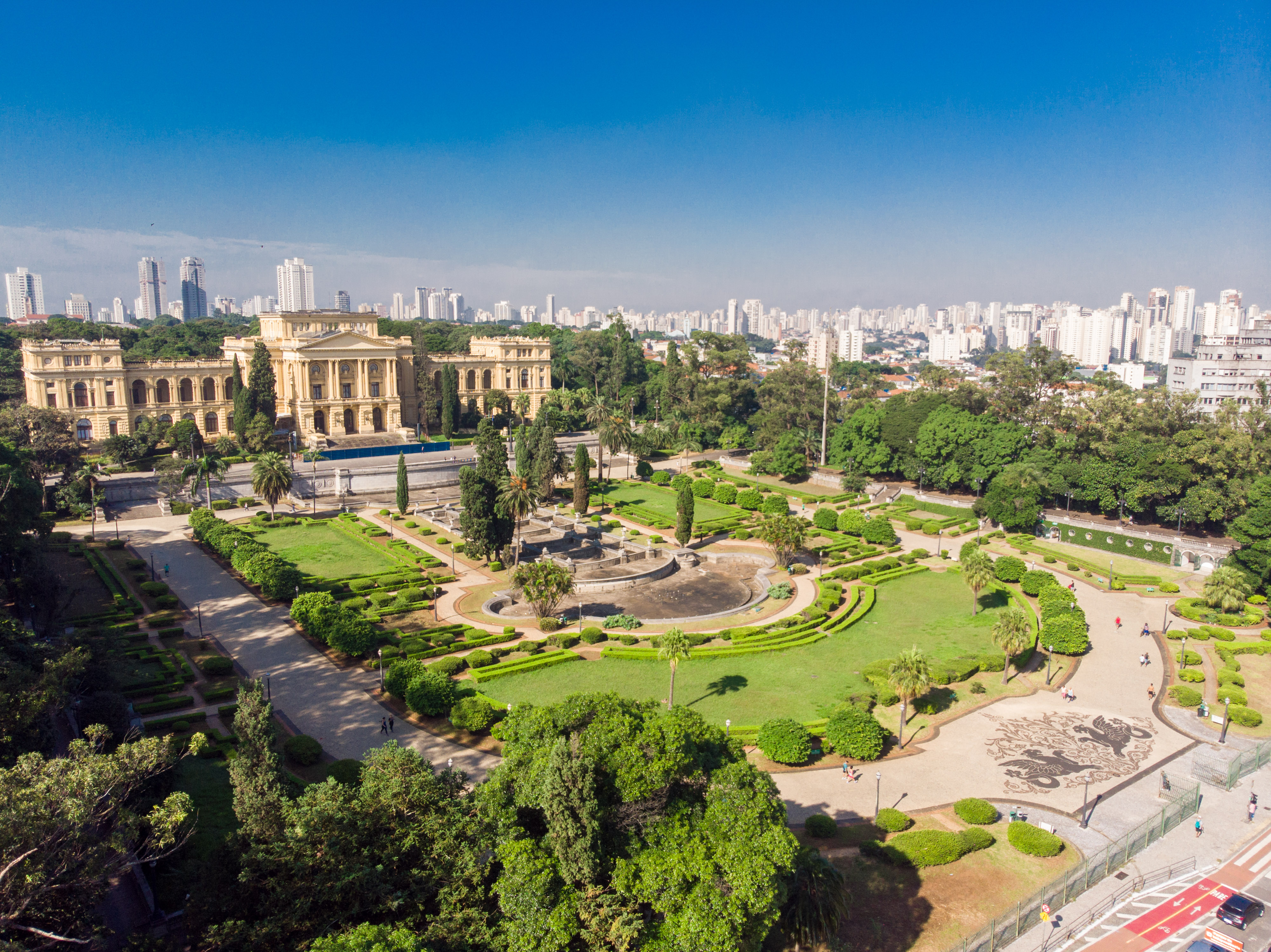
Parque da Independência

Independence Park (Portuguese: Parque da Independência) is an urban park in the Ipiranga district of São Paulo, Brazil. The park is located at the site where the prince regent of Brazil, the future Emperor Pedro I, proclaimed the country's independence in 1822. The main attractions within the park are the Ipiranga Museum and the Monument to the Independence of Brazil (where Pedro I and his two wives are interred), also known as the Ipiranga Monument or the Altar of the Fatherland.

== Gallery ==
Parque da Independência
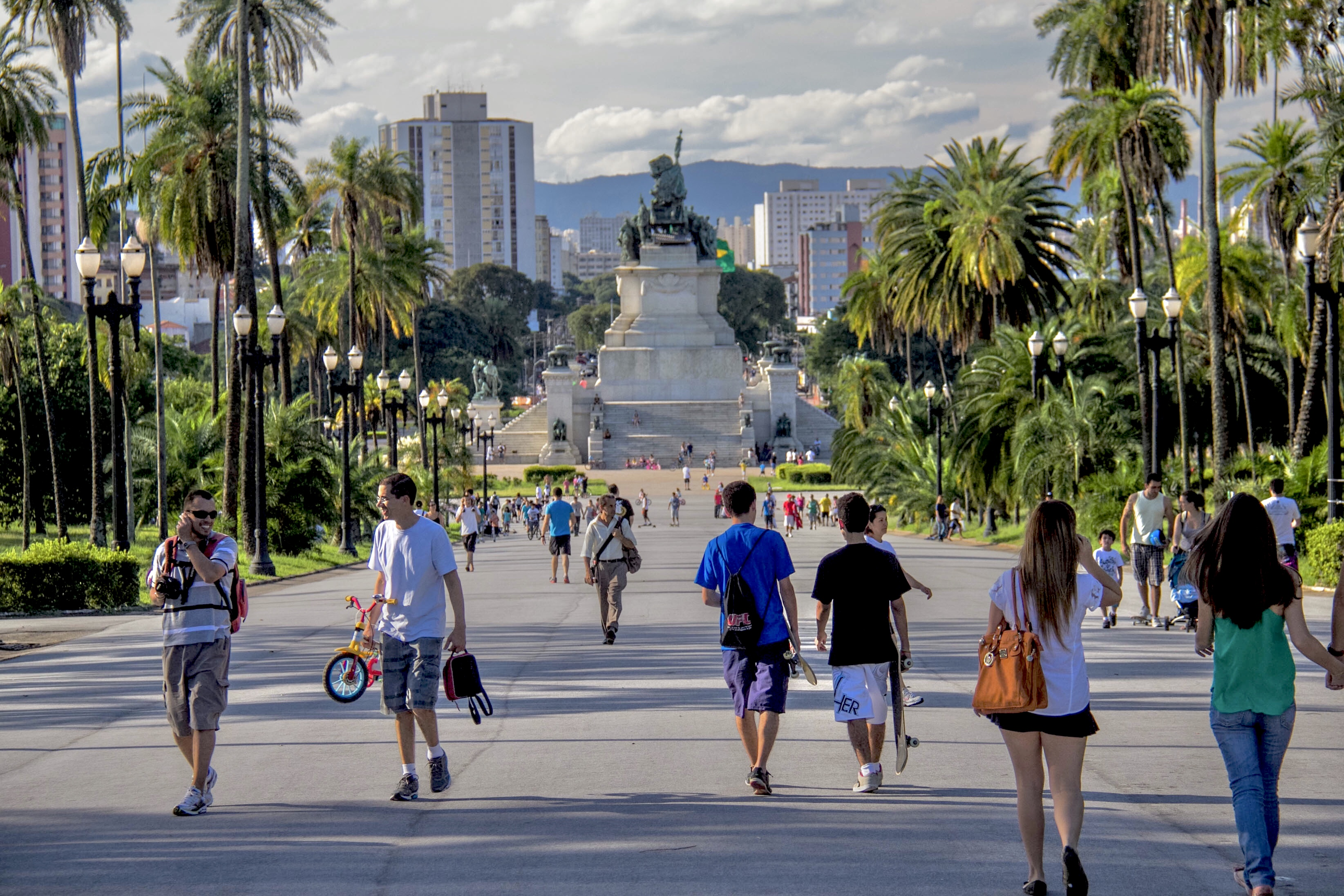
People walking along the boulevard between the Ipiranga Museum and the Monument to the Independence of Brazil (visible in the distance)

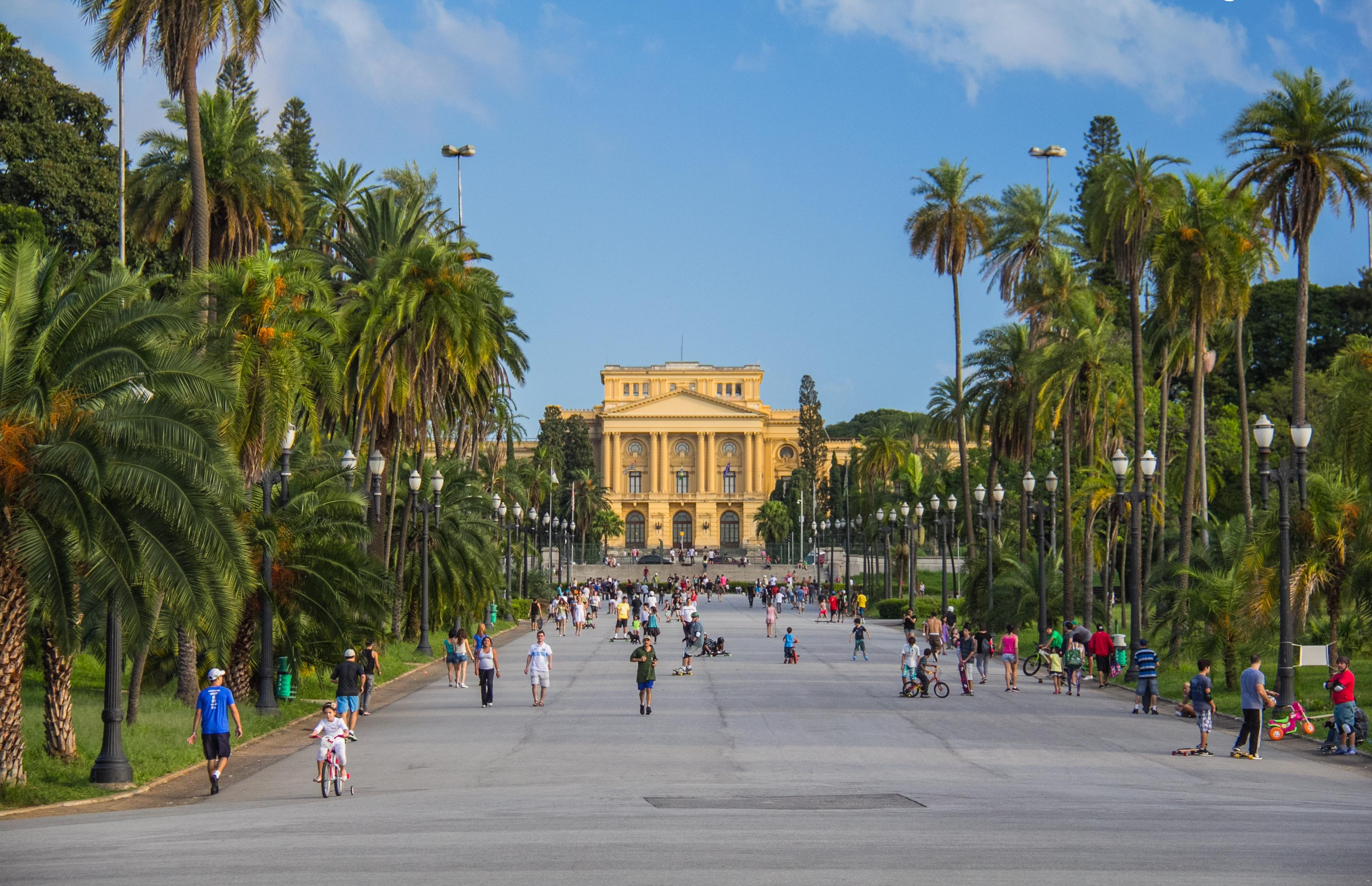
The park during a weekend. The Ipiranga Museum can be seen to the rear

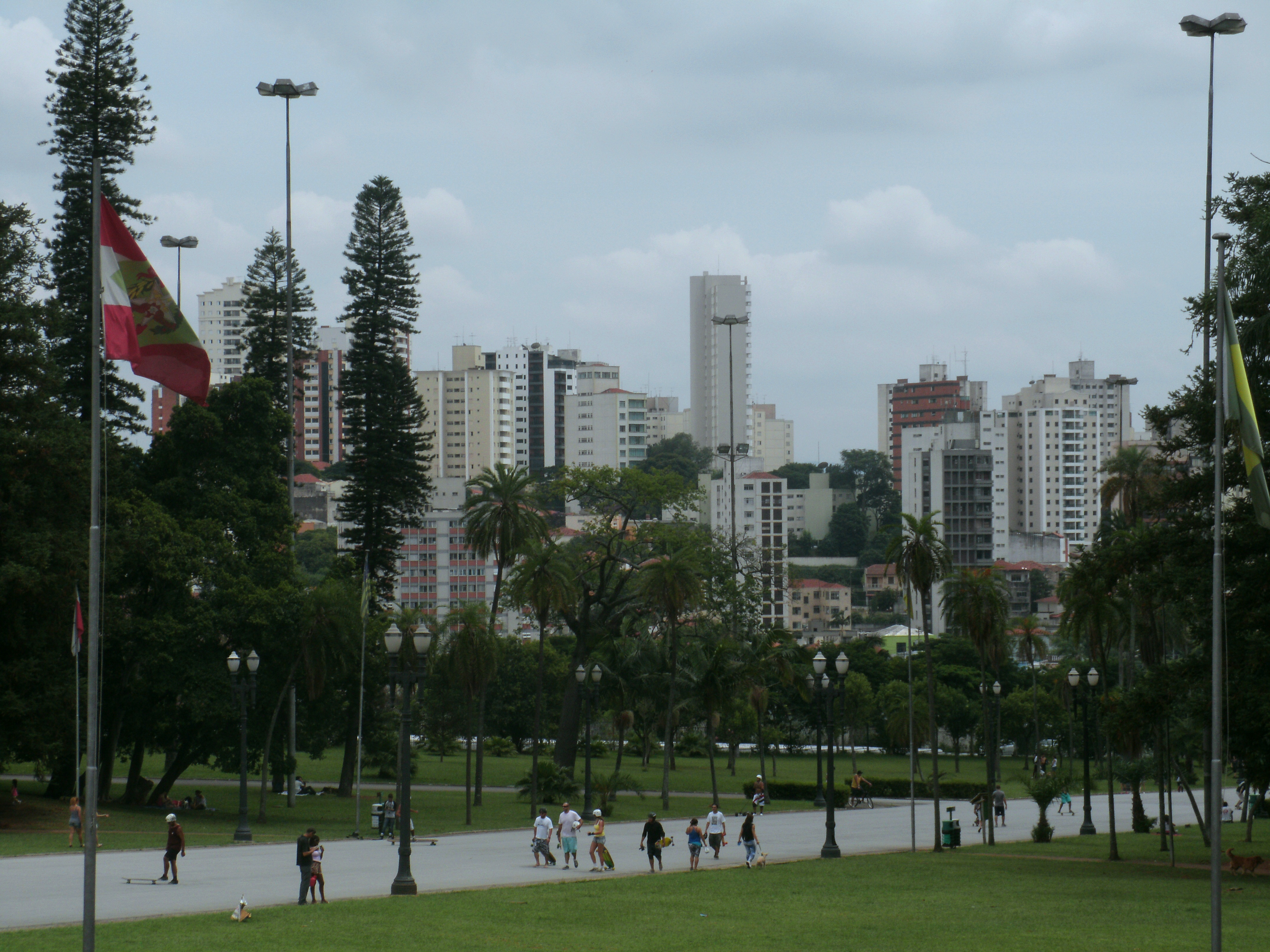
A glimpse of the neighborhood from the park

== Bibliography ==
- Macaulay, Neill (1986). Dom Pedro: The Struggle for Liberty in Brazil and Portugal, 1798–1834. Durham, North Carolina: Duke University Press. ISBN 978-0-8223-0681-8.
