= Cathedral of Petrópolis =

Roman Catholic cathedral in Petrópolis, Brazil

Coordinates: 22°30′20″S 43°10′45″W

Cathedral of Saint Peter of Alcantara Catedral de São Pedro de Alcântara
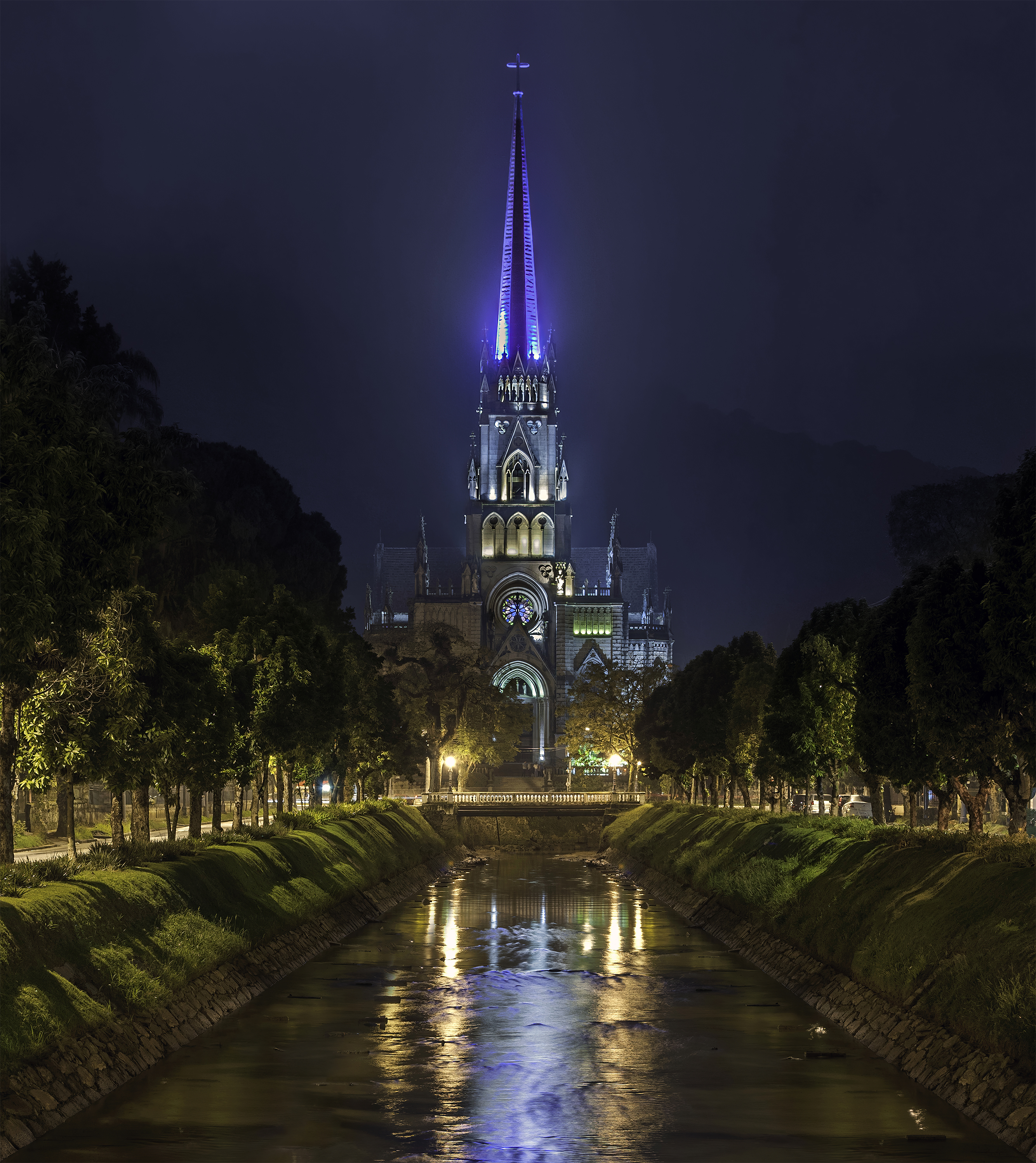

Religion
- Affiliation: Roman Catholic
- Province: Diocese of Petrópolis
- Leadership: Dom Gregório Paixão
- Year consecrated: 1884
- Status: Active

Location
- Location: Petrópolis, Brazil
- Interactive map of Cathedral of Saint Peter of Alcantara; Catedral de São Pedro de Alcântara

Architecture
- Architect: Francisco Caminhoá
- Style: Neo-Gothic
- Groundbreaking: 1884
- Completed: 1925

The Cathedral of Saint Peter of Alcantara (Portuguese: Catedral de São Pedro de Alcântara), also known as the Cathedral of Petrópolis, is a Roman Catholic cathedral in Petrópolis, Brazil, dedicated to the city's patron saint, Peter of Alcantara. The cathedral is also the final resting place of the last Emperor of Brazil, Dom Pedro II, and his family.

The construction on the Gothic Revival style church began in 1884, and was completed in 1925. The church tower was built in 1969.

== History ==
Originally, the mother church of Petrópolis was a modest building located in front of the Imperial Palace but the construction of a new one on the same site was proposed in the urbanization plan of Petrópolis, dated 1843, produced by Major Júlio Frederico Koeler.

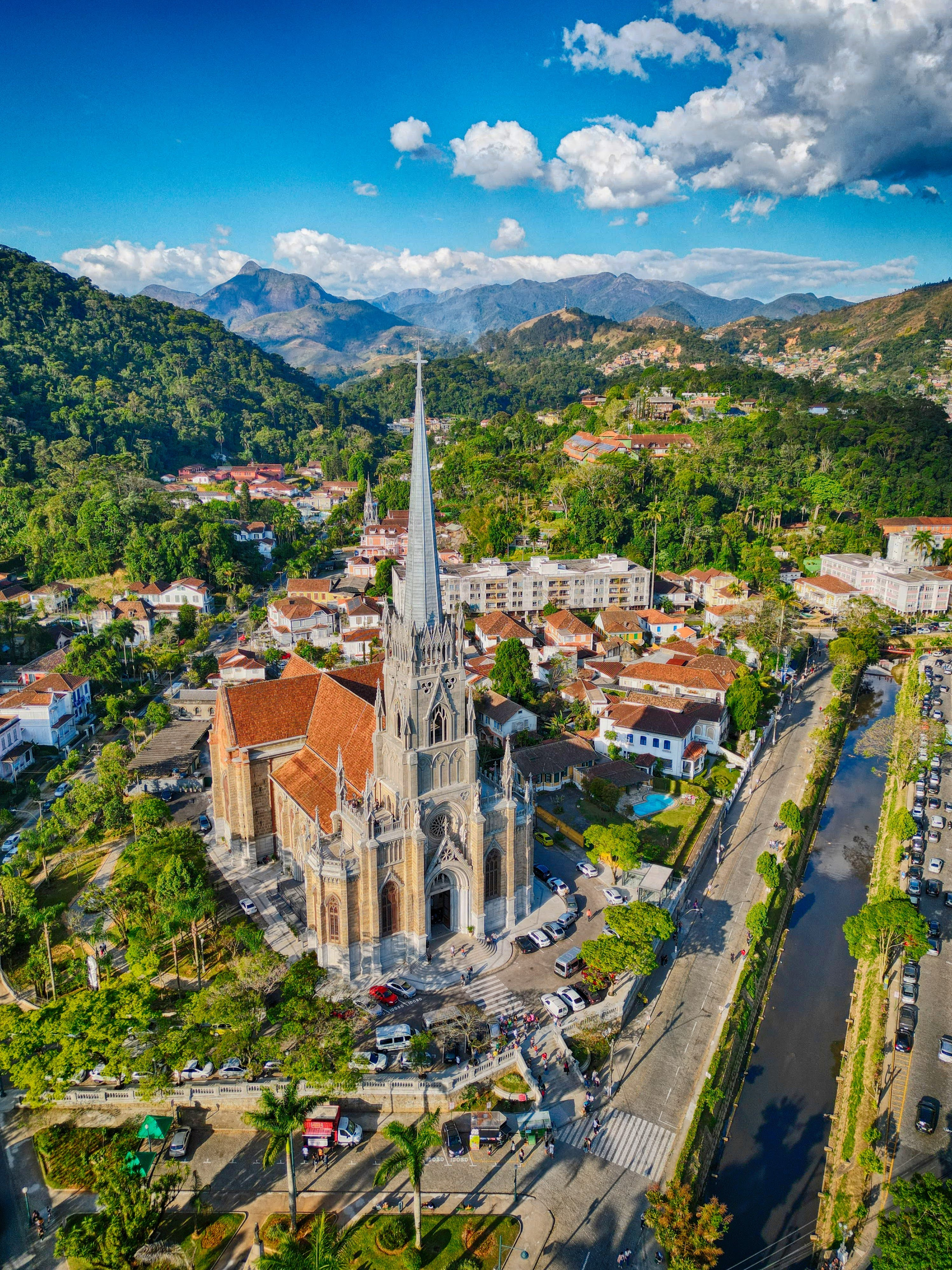
Aerial view

In the 1870s the construction of the new church was reconsidered, thanks to the interest of Emperor Pedro II and his daughter, Isabel, Princess Imperial. In 1871 the construction of a new Matrix was officially sanctioned but it would be slow to materialize. In 1876 the Italian architect Federico Roncetti presented a plan in Renaissance Revival architecture that was refused.

The current building of the cathedral only began in 1884. The project was commissioned from the Bahian engineer and architect Francisco Caminhoá, who designed a Neo-Gothic style building, very fashionable at the time, especially inspired by the old cathedrals of northern France. The work was carried out by the contractor Manuel Pereira Jerônimo, son of one of the first families to settle in the city, coming from Pico Island in the Azores.

The construction of the cathedral did not stop after the Proclamation of the Republic and continued until 1901 when the works enter a period of paralysis. Under the command of engineer Heitor da Silva Costa the work entered into a second phase of intense activity in 1918. Finally, on 29 November 1925, the new Cathedral of Petrópolis was inaugurated after 37 years of work. The building, however, was not complete, lacking the main façade and the tower, and much of the interior decoration. The works of the façade only began in 1929 and reached rosette level in the 1930s. The tower was built between 1960 and 1969.

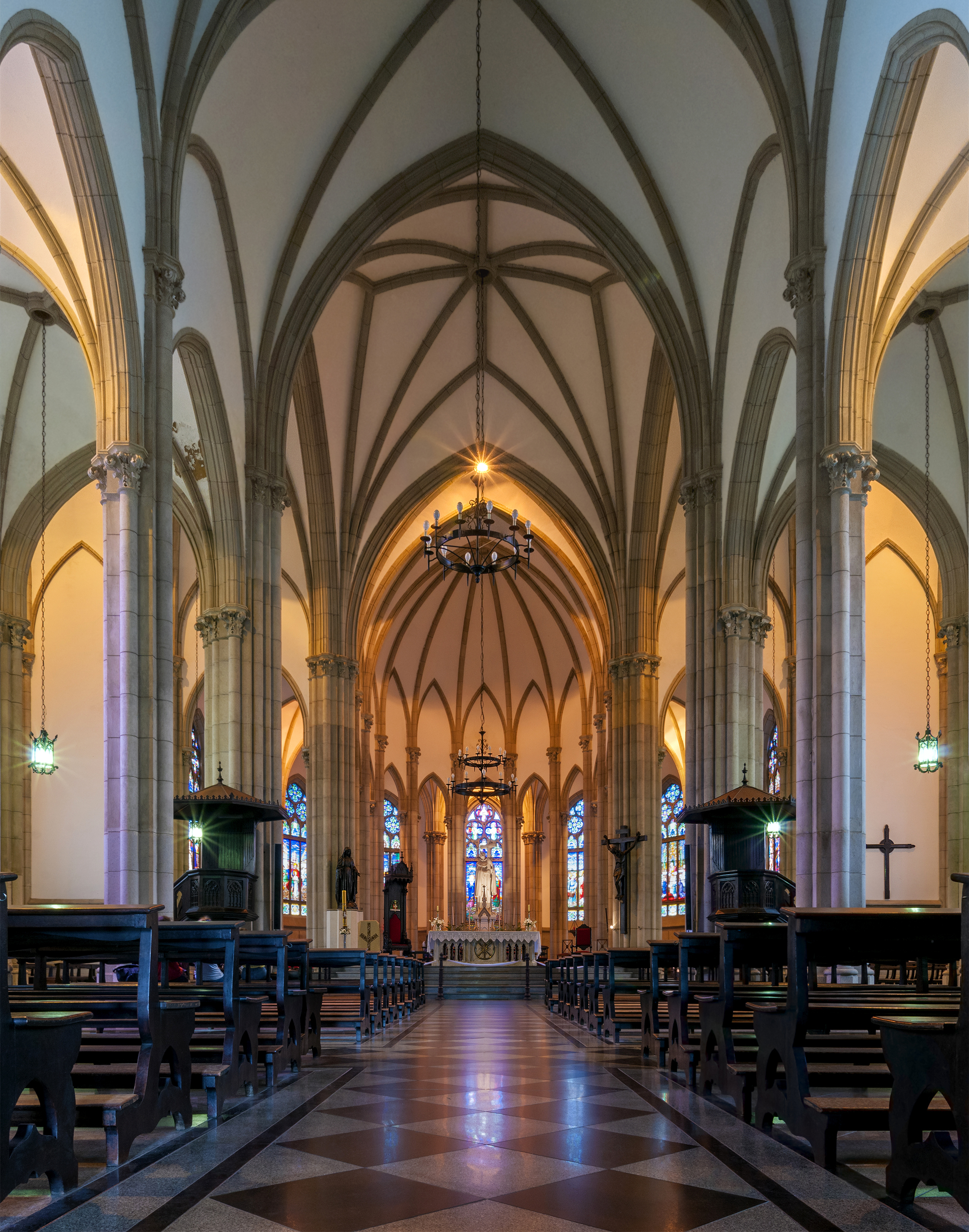
Petrópolis Cathedral interior

In 1920 the decree banning the Brazilian Imperial Family was annulled and in 1921 the remains of Emperor Pedro II and his wife, Teresa Cristina of the Two Sicilies, were brought from the Royal Pantheon of the House of Braganza in Lisbon to Rio de Janeiro, where they were housed in the old Metropolitan Cathedral. In 1925 the remains were transferred to the sacristy of the Cathedral of Petrópolis. Finally, on 5 December 1939, President Getúlio Vargas and other authorities inaugurated the Imperial Mausoleum, where the Emperor and Empress were finally transferred. In 1971 Princess Isabel and her husband, Gaston, Count of Eu were buried in the mausoleum.

== Description ==
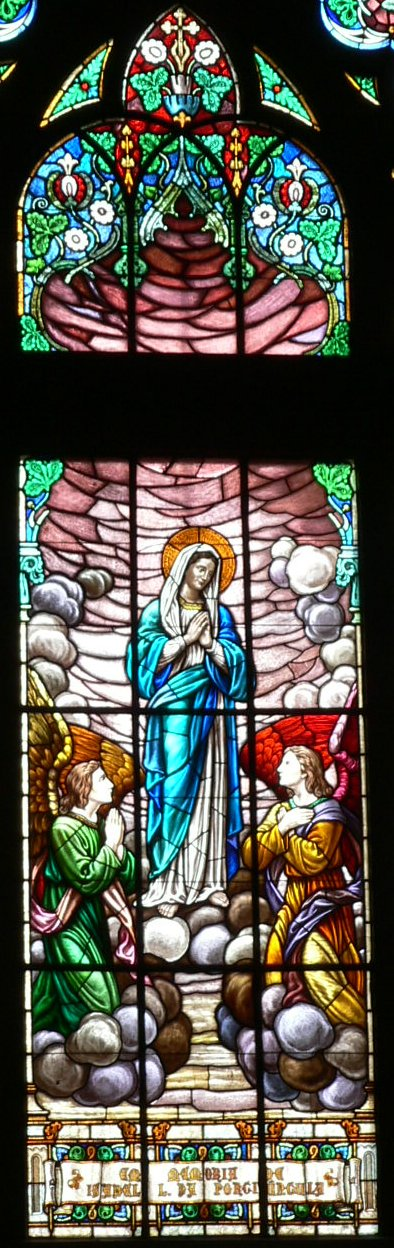
Window of the cathedral

The Cathedral of Petrópolis is a Neo-Gothic church of Latin cross with little pronounced transept and three naves. The headboard has an ambulatory connected with the main chapel. The cathedral measures 70 meters in length and 22 meters wide, with a height of 19 meters on the naves.

The main façade of the church has a portal with multiple archivolts in the form of pointed arches. In the place of the tympanum there is a Calvary (Crucified Christ, the Virgin and Joseph of Arimathea), and in the upper part of the façade are statues of the four evangelists (St. Mark, St. Luke, St. John and St. Matthew). All these sculptures are authored by Adam Bordignon (c.1935). The façade also contains a rose window.

The tower, the most recent element of the church (1960s), rises 70 meters above the ground and contains a chime of five cast bronze bells in Passau, Germany weighing nine tons.

Inside, the spaces are divided by typically pointed Gothic arches. On the right side of the entrance is the Imperial Mausoleum and on the left side the baptistery, with the baptismal font of the former matrix of Petrópolis (1848). The choir of the church has a main altar made of Portuguese Lioz Limestone. In the ambulatory there is a huge statue of the patron of the cathedral and monarchy, St. Peter of Alcantara, carved in Carrara marble by Frenchman Jean Magrou (c.1925). The stained-glass windows of the ambulatory and nave date mostly from the 1930s.

The cathedral has an important organ, manufactured in Rio de Janeiro and installed in 1937 by Guillermo Berner.

== Imperial Mausoleum ==
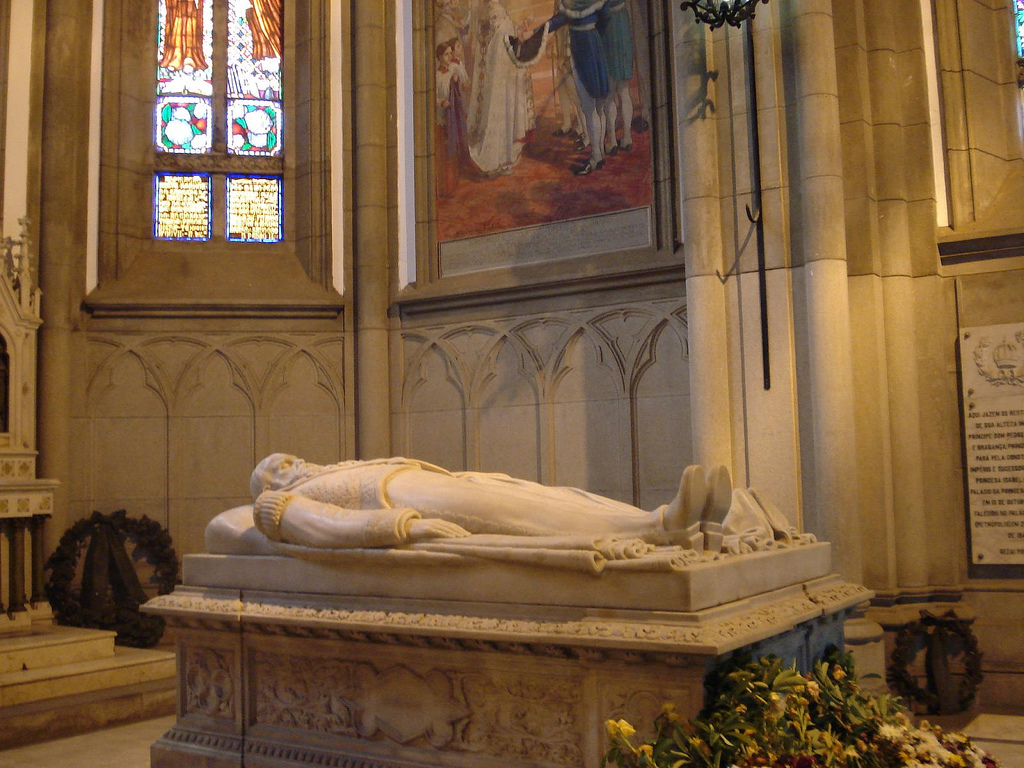
Tomb of Emperor Pedro II and Empress Teresa Cristina in the Imperial Mausoleum

The church houses the Imperial Mausoleum, which is a small chapel situated to the right of the churchyard of the cathedral. The main tombs were carved in Carrara marble circa 1925 by French sculptor Jean Magrou, author of the gisants, and by Brazilian sculptor Hildegardo Leão Veloso, author of the reliefs on the sides. The other tombs were carved by Brazilian sculptor Humberto Cozzo. The windows of the chapel have colorful stained glass windows with poems written by Pedro II during his exile, in which the Emperor reveals his longing for his native country. The altar of the chapel, carved in marble and with a granite cross from Tijuca, contains relics of the saints Magnus, Aurelia, and Tecla, brought from Rome.

Among the members of the Brazilian Imperial Family buried in the Imperial Mausoleum since its inauguration in 1939 are:

1. Emperor Pedro II (1825–1891), the last Emperor of Brazil
2. Empress Teresa Cristina (1822–1889), wife of the above
3. Isabel, Princess Imperial of Brazil (1846–1921), Pedro II's heir
4. Prince Gaston, Count of Eu (1842–1922), husband of the above
5. Pedro de Alcântara, Prince of Grão-Pará (1875–1940), Isabel and Gaston's eldest son
6. Countess Elizabeth Dobrženský von Dobrženitz (1875–1951), wife of the above

== Gallery ==
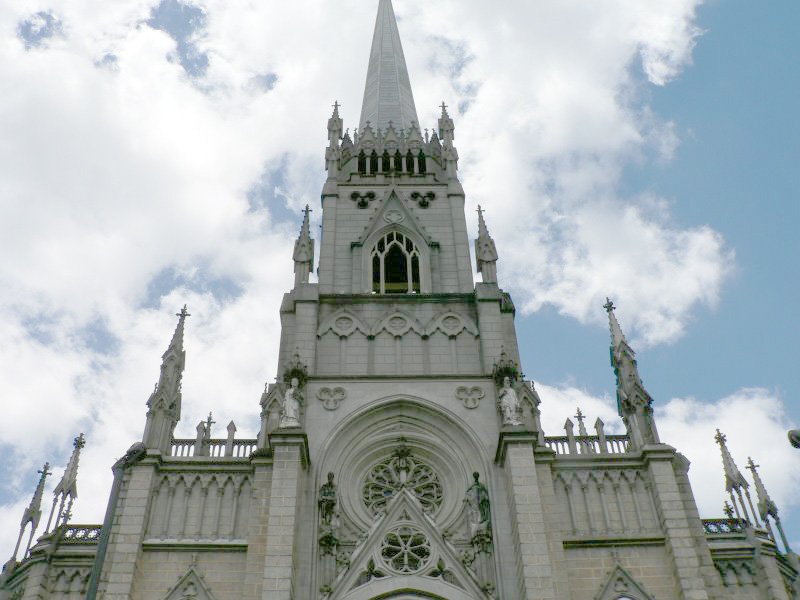
Upper facade

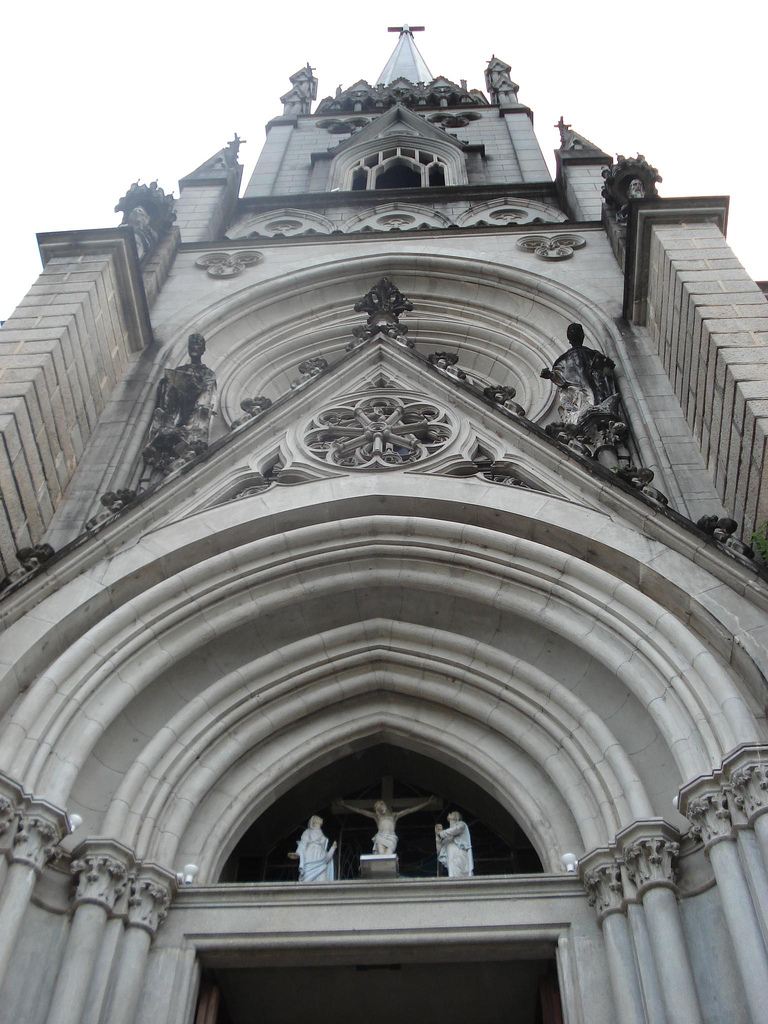
Lower facade, with Gothic revival portal

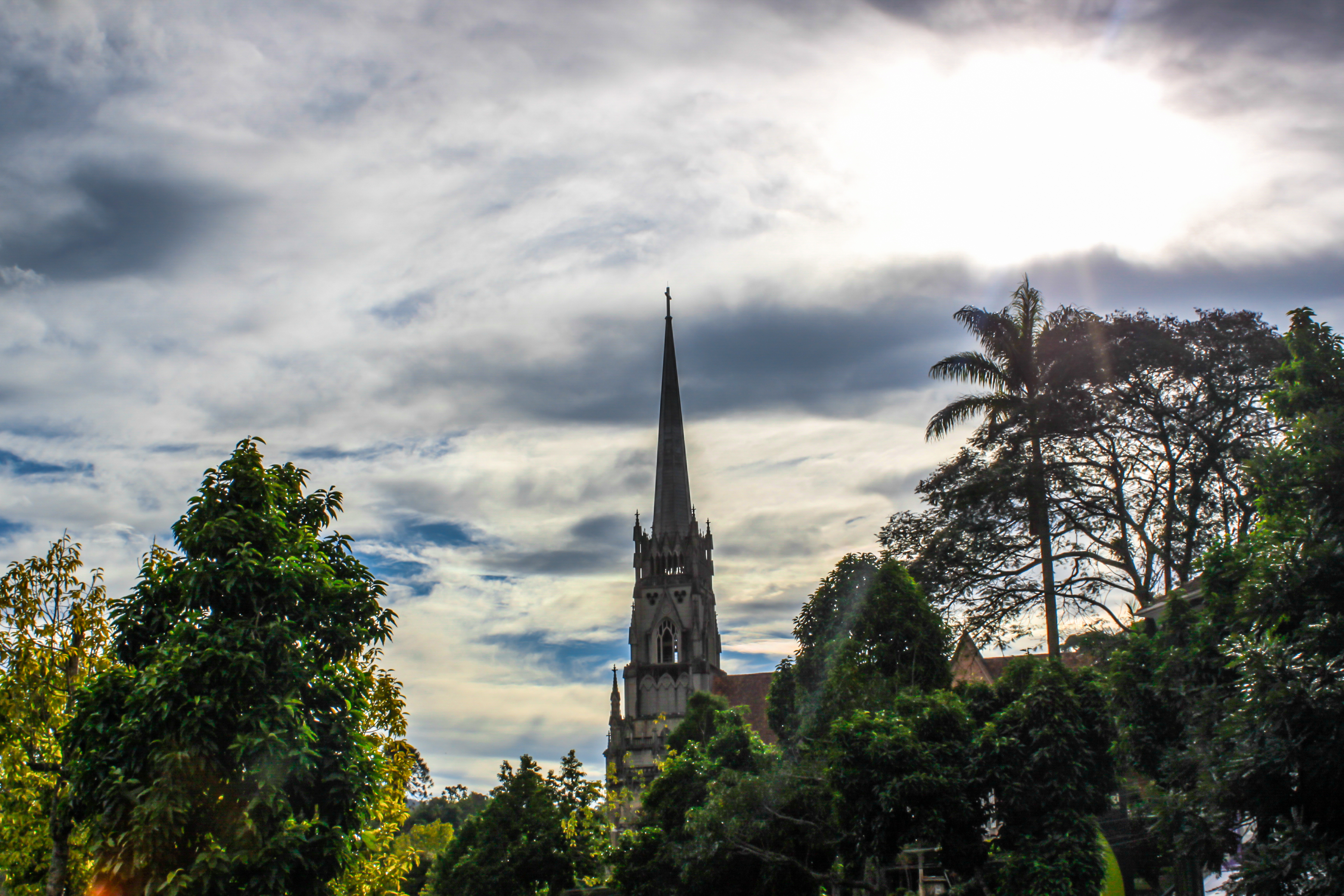
Side view of the church with surrounding vegetation

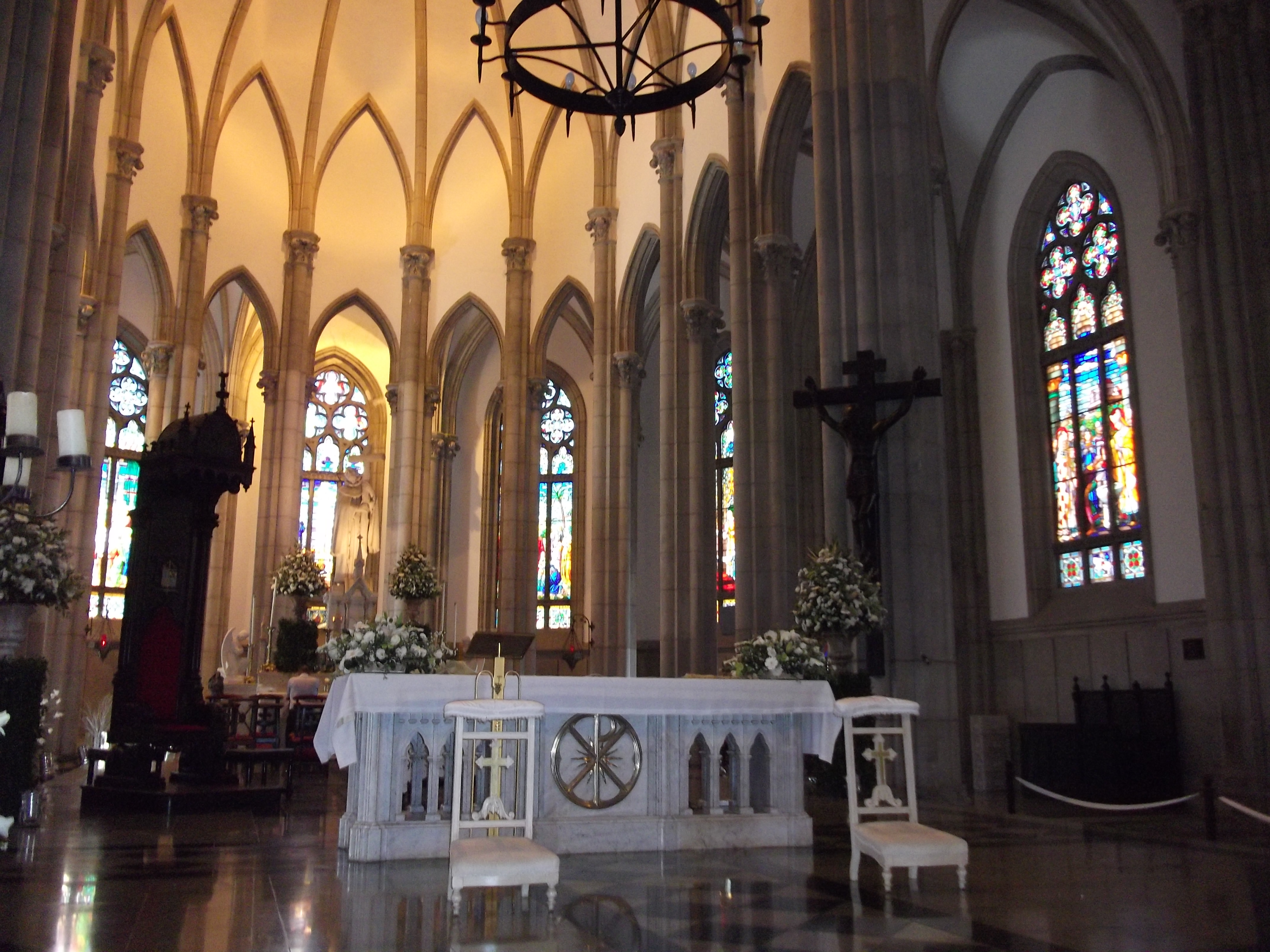
Gothic revival choir of the Cathedral

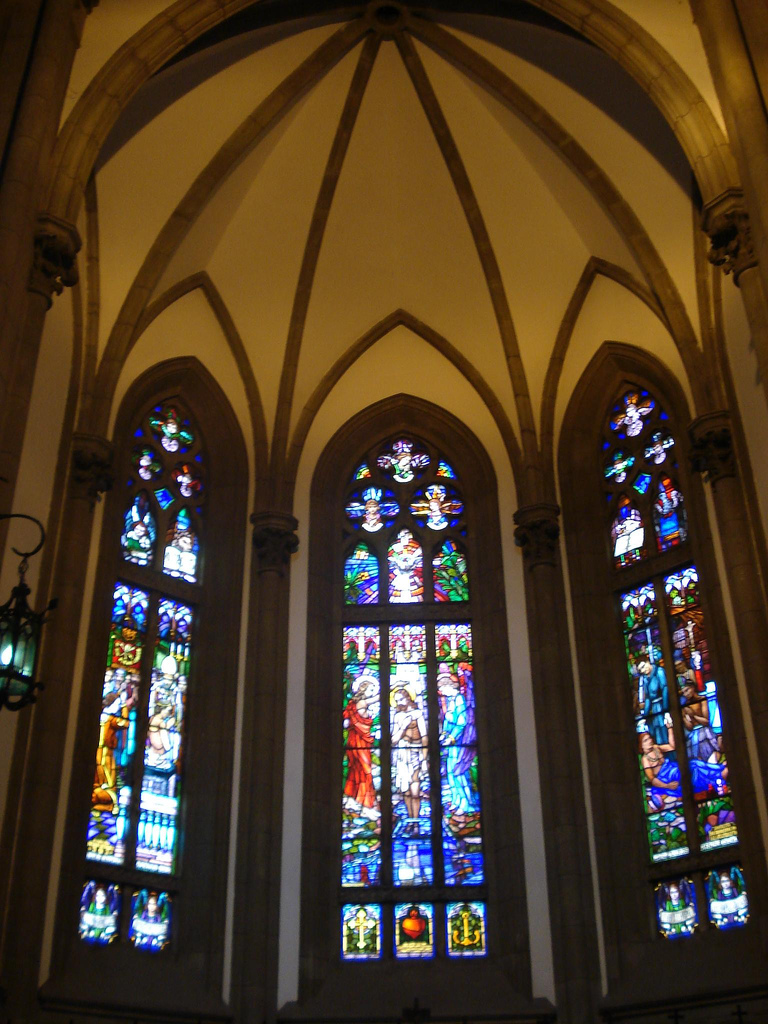
Stained glass in the Imperial Mausoleum

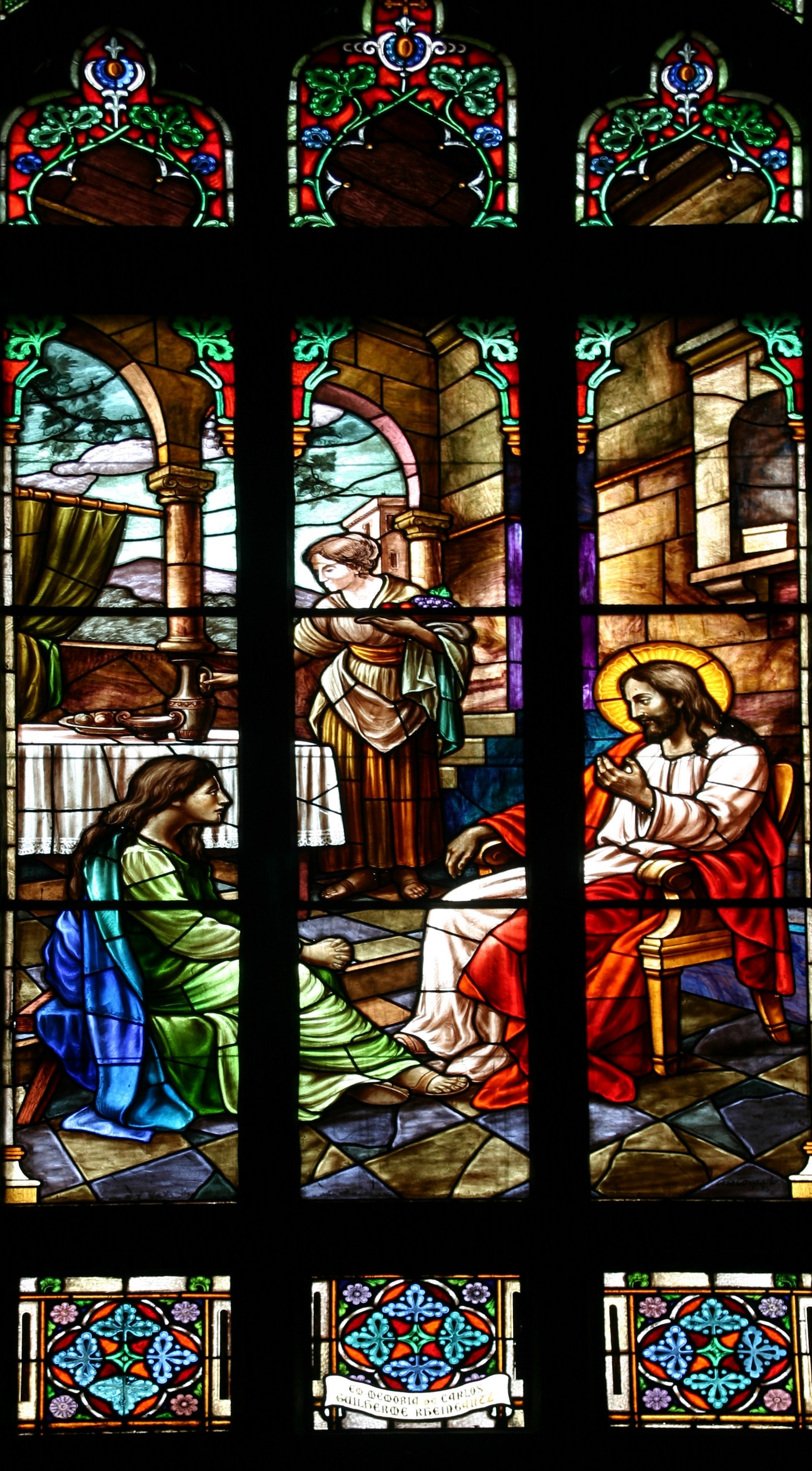
Jesus in the house of Martha and Mary on stained glass windows

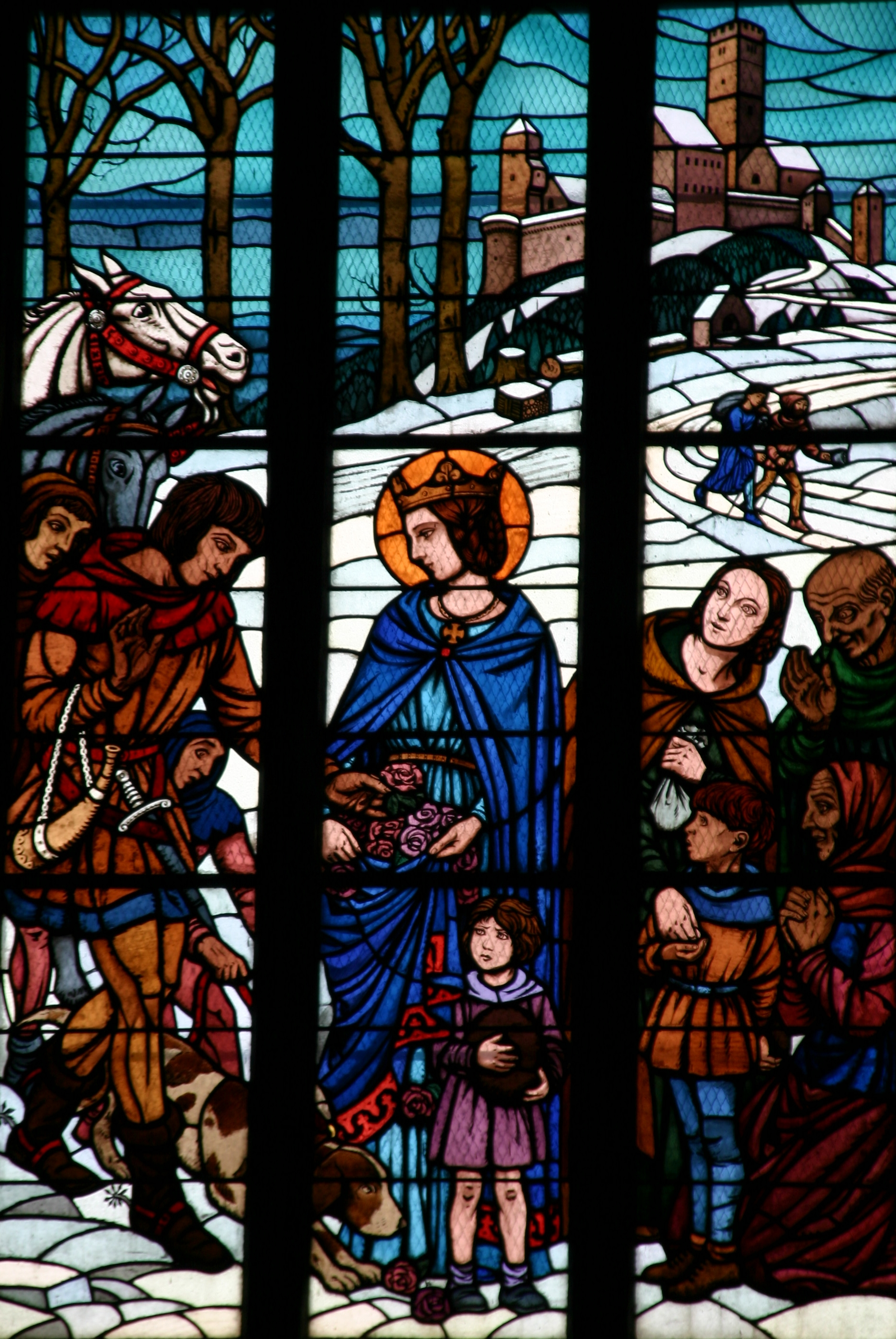
Stained glass window of Saint Elizabeth of Hungary

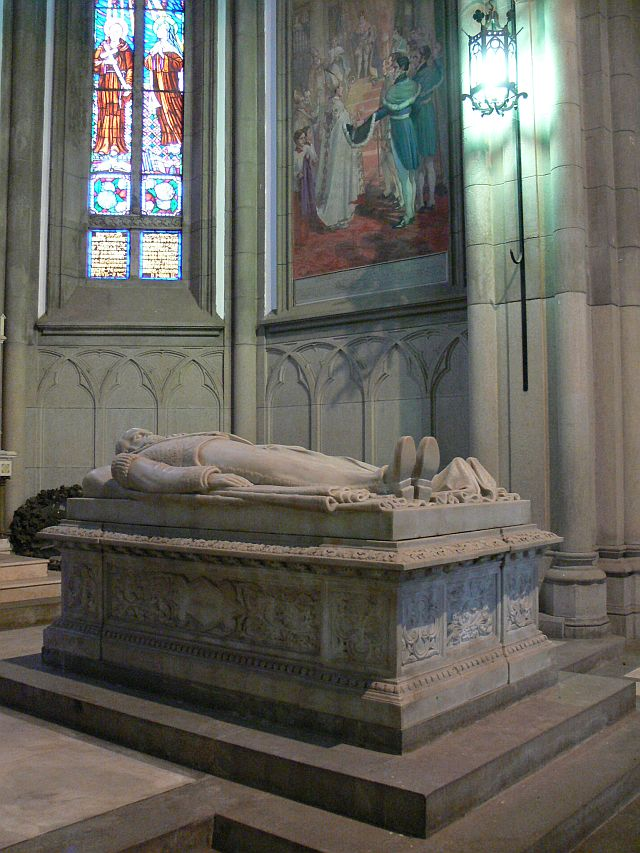
Side view of the tomb of Pedro II and Teresa Cristina

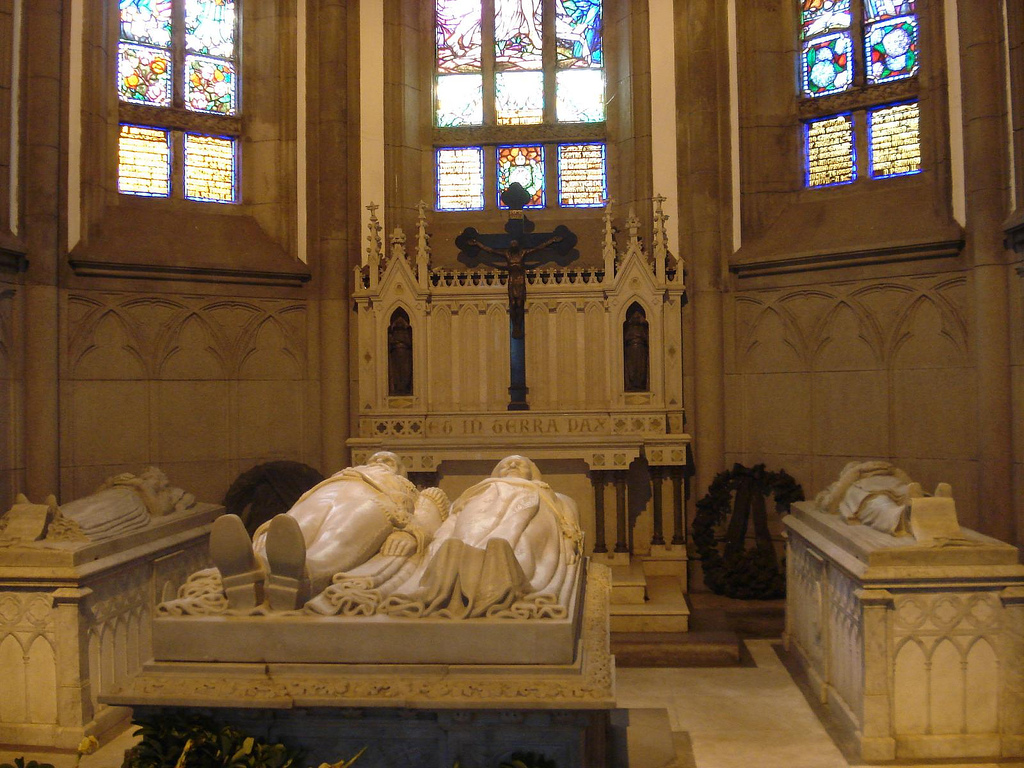
Tombs of Pedro II and Teresa Cristina (center), Princess Isabel (left), and Prince Gaston (right)

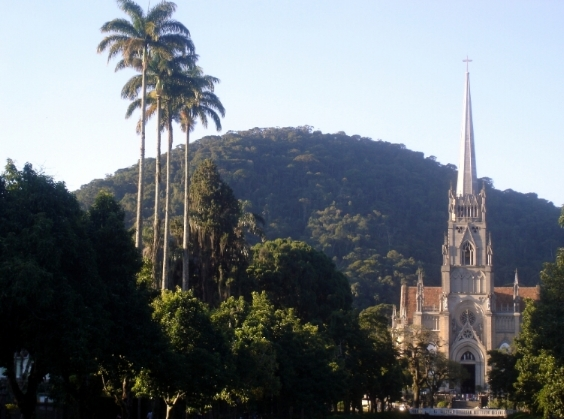
Cathedral of Petrópolis from the outside

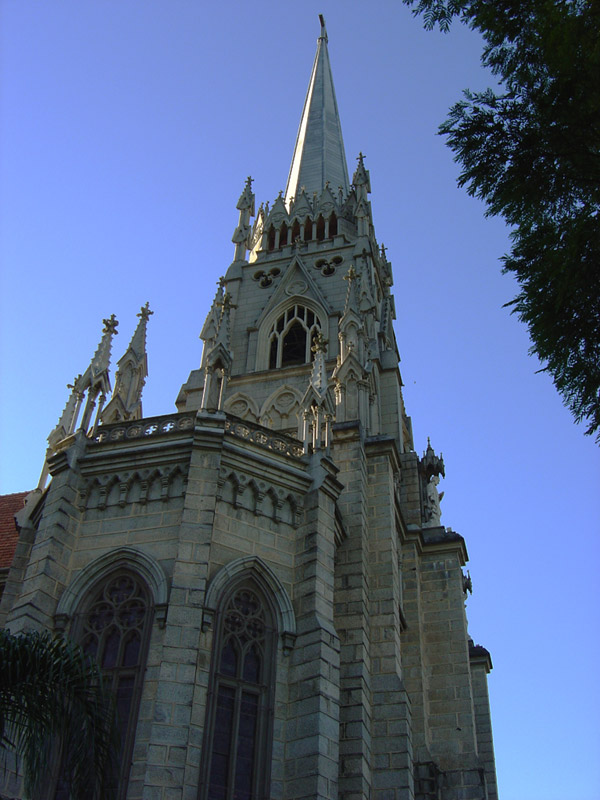
Petrópolis Cathedral façade with bell tower

== See also ==
- Burials at the Imperial Mausoleum at the Cathedral of Petrópolis
- Burial places of members of the Brazilian imperial family
- Buildings in Petrópolis
- Gothic Revival church buildings
