= Monument to the Independence of Brazil =

Sculpture in São Paulo, Brazil

- Monumento à Independência do Brasil (Brazilian Portuguese)
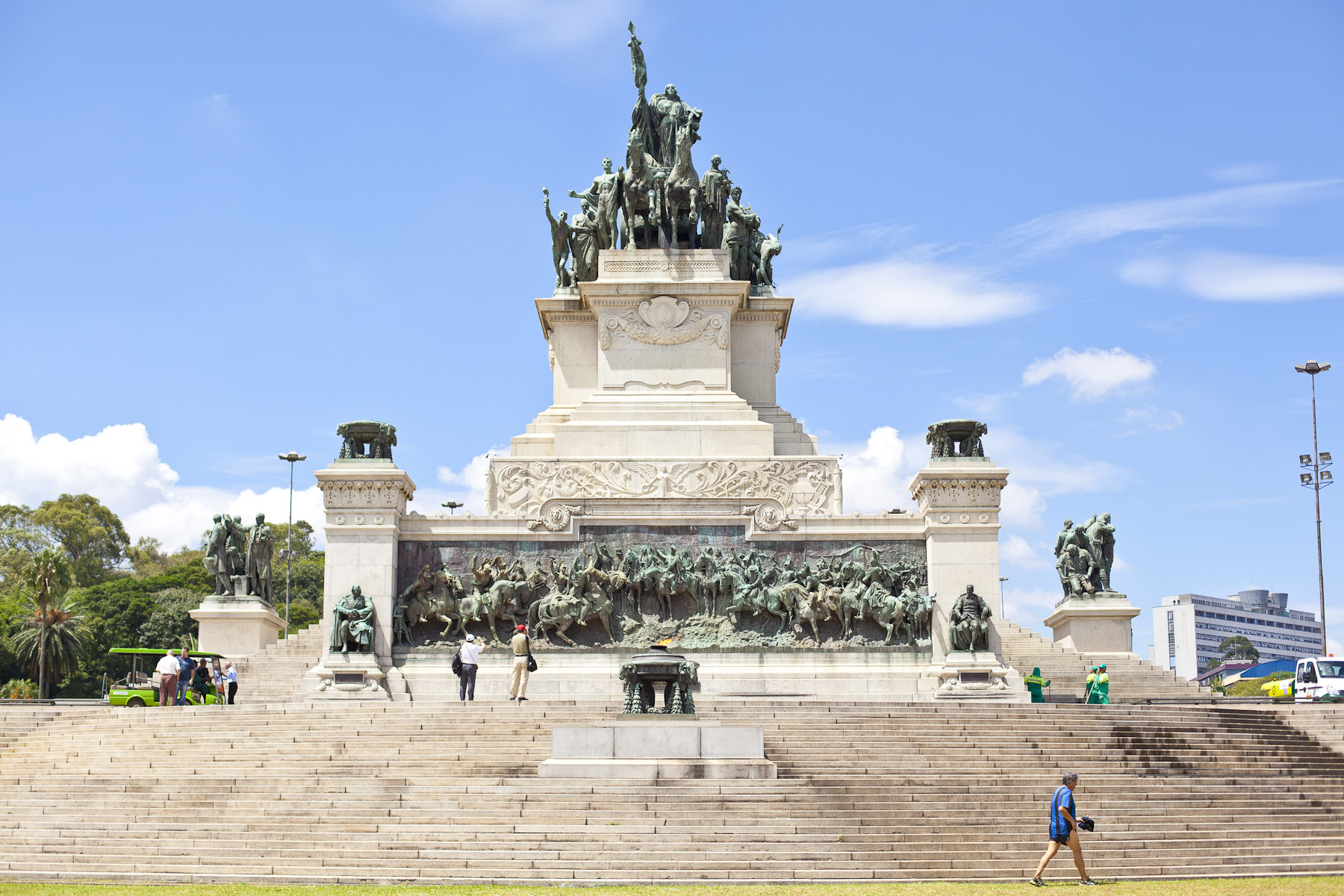
- The monument marks the spot where Brazilian Independence was declared.
- Interactive map of Monument to the Independence of Brazil
- 23°34′49″S 46°36′36″W
- Location: São Paulo, Brazil

History
- Founded: 1922
- Built: 1884–1926

Site notes
- Architect: Manfredo Manfredi
- Sculptor: Ettore Ximenes
- Governing body: São Paulo

The Monument to the Independence of Brazil (Portuguese: Monumento à Independência do Brasil) is a granite and bronze monument located within the Independence Park in São Paulo, Brazil. It is also known as the Ipiranga Monument (Monumento do Ipiranga) or the Altar of the Fatherland (Altar da Pátria). The monument is located on the banks of the Ipiranga Brook, on the historic site where prince regent Pedro (later emperor as Pedro I) proclaimed the independence of the country on 7 September 1822.

The monument was designed and built by Italian sculptor Ettore Ximenes (1855–1926) and Italian architect Manfredo Manfredi (1859–1927) to celebrate the first centennial of Brazilian Independence in 1922.

== The crypt ==
The Imperial Crypt and Chapel is located beneath the monument. The crypt was built in 1972 to house the remains of Emperor Pedro I of Brazil (also King of Portugal as Pedro IV) and his wives, Maria Leopoldina of Austria and Amélie of Leuchtenberg. The crypt is consecrated as a Catholic chapel, as demanded by the then-head of the Imperial House of Brazil, Pedro Henrique of Orléans-Braganza. He agreed to allow the transfer of the remains of his ancestors to the monument on the condition that the place be consecrated as a Catholic place of burial, with a Catholic altar where Mass could be said. Pedro I and Amélie's remains were transferred from the Royal Pantheon of the House of Braganza in Lisbon; Maria Leopoldina's were moved from a mausoleum in the Convent of Saint Anthony in Rio de Janeiro.

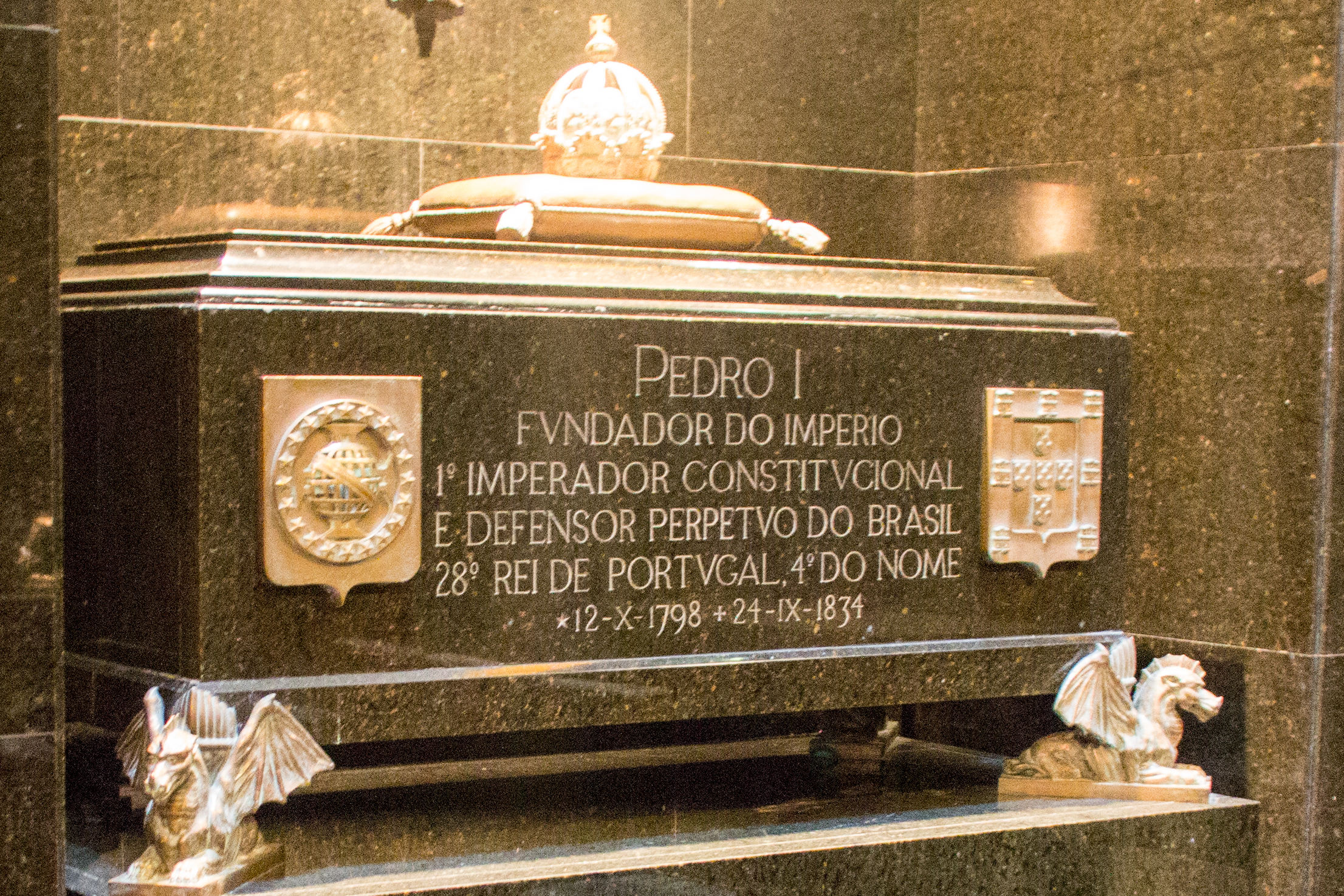
Pedro I's sarcophagus (Note: The inscription reads: "Pedro I, founder of the Empire, 1st Constitutional Emperor and Perpetual Defender of Brazil, 28th King of Portugal, 4th of his name".)

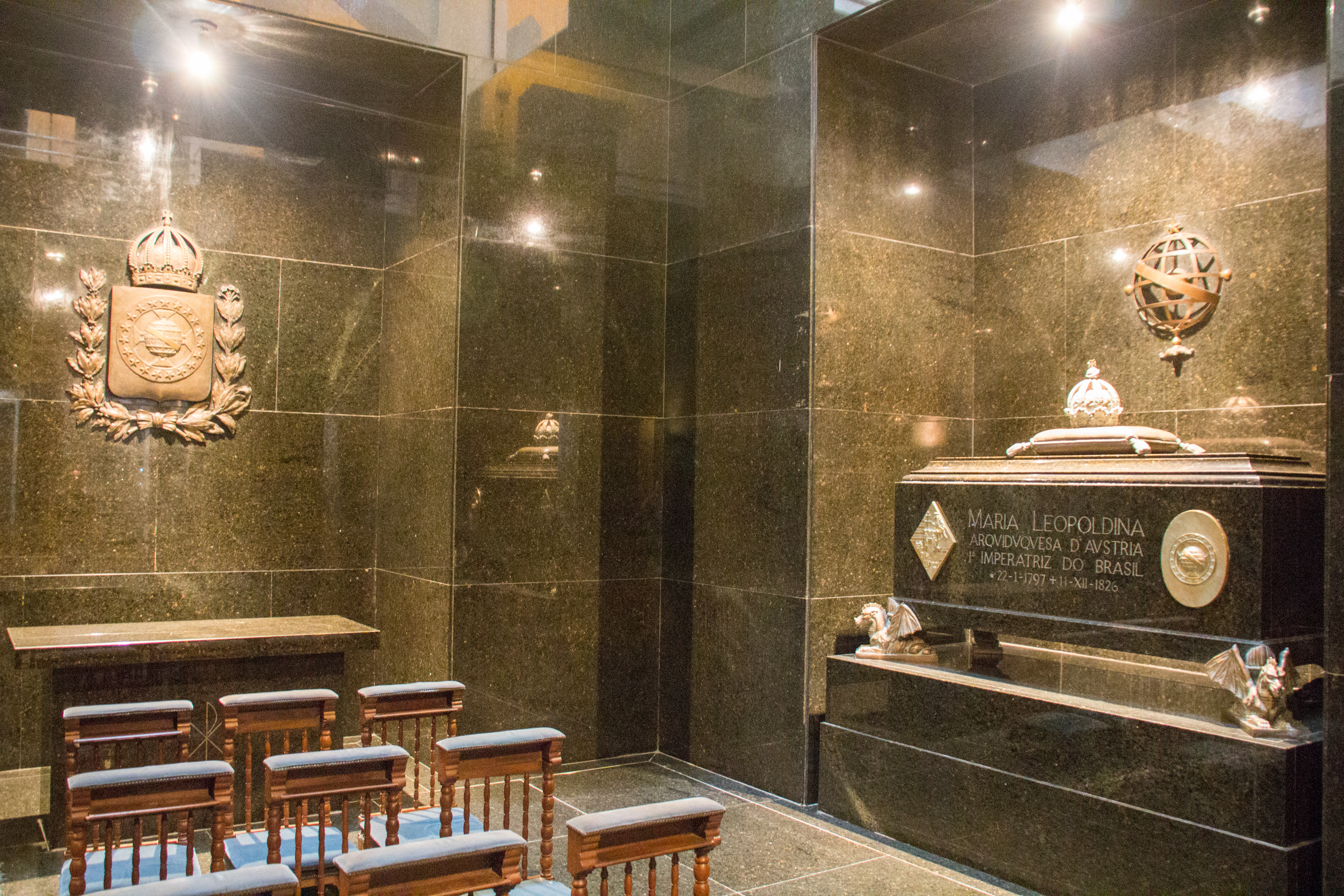
Maria Leopoldina's sarcophagus (Note: Inscription: "Maria Leopoldina, Archduchess of Austria, 1st Empress of Brazil".)

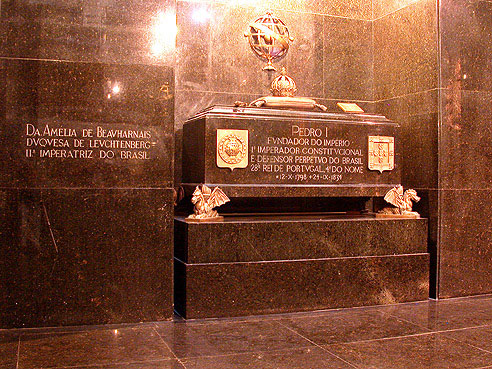
Amélie's crypt (right) (Note: Inscription: "Da. Amélia de Beauharnais, Duchess of Leuchtenberg, 2nd Empress of Brazil".)

== Sculptural set ==
=== Central panel ===
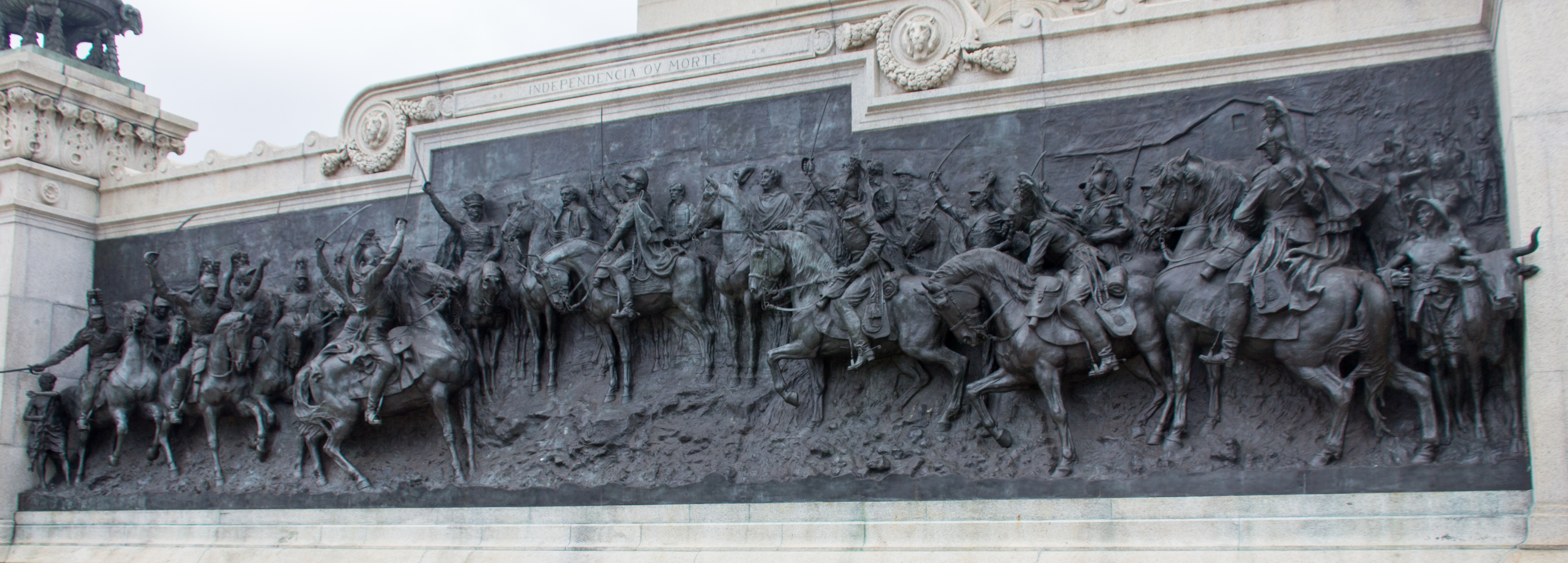
The central relief panel depicting the Cry of Ipiranga

=== The revolutionaries ===
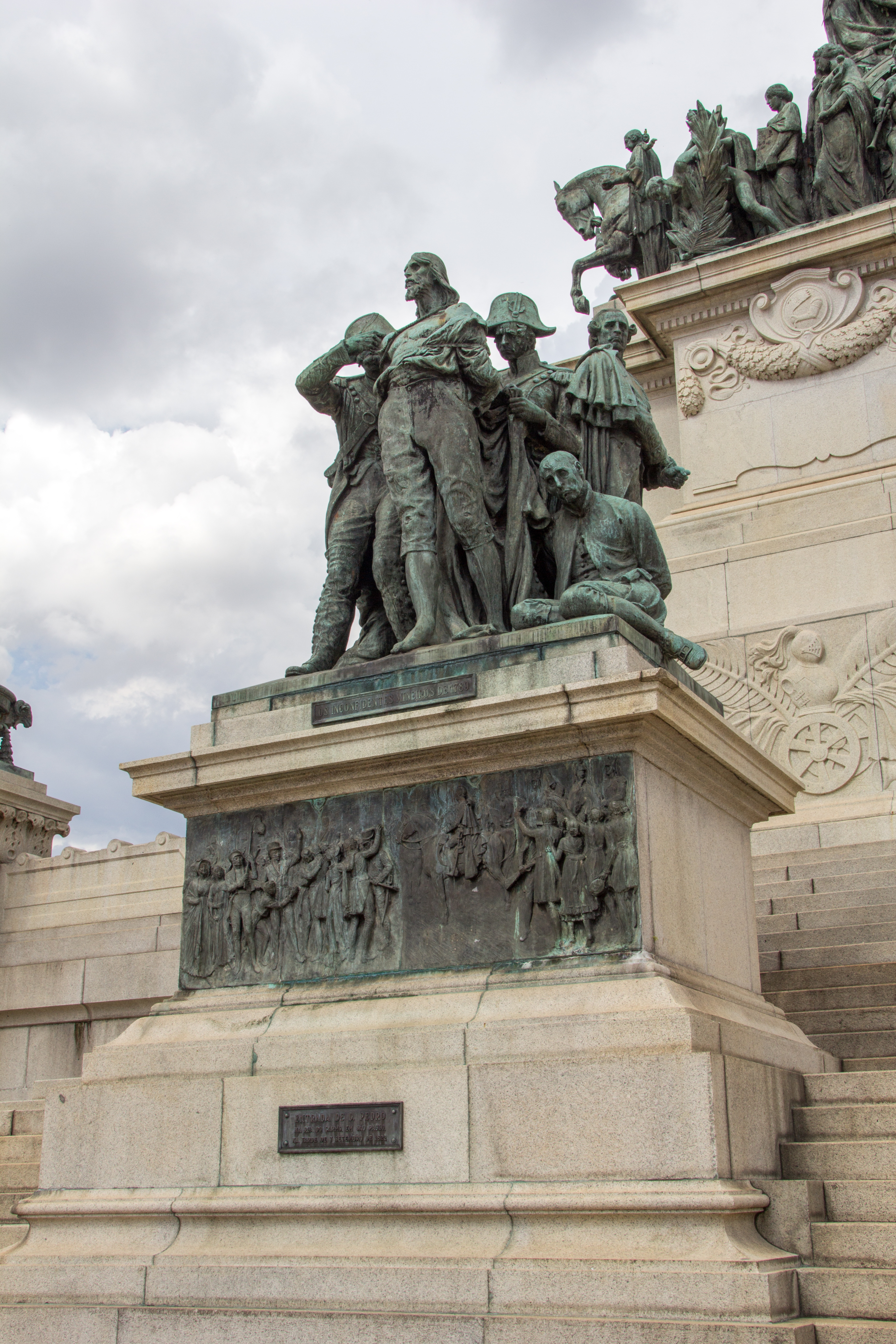
The Minas Gerais conspirators

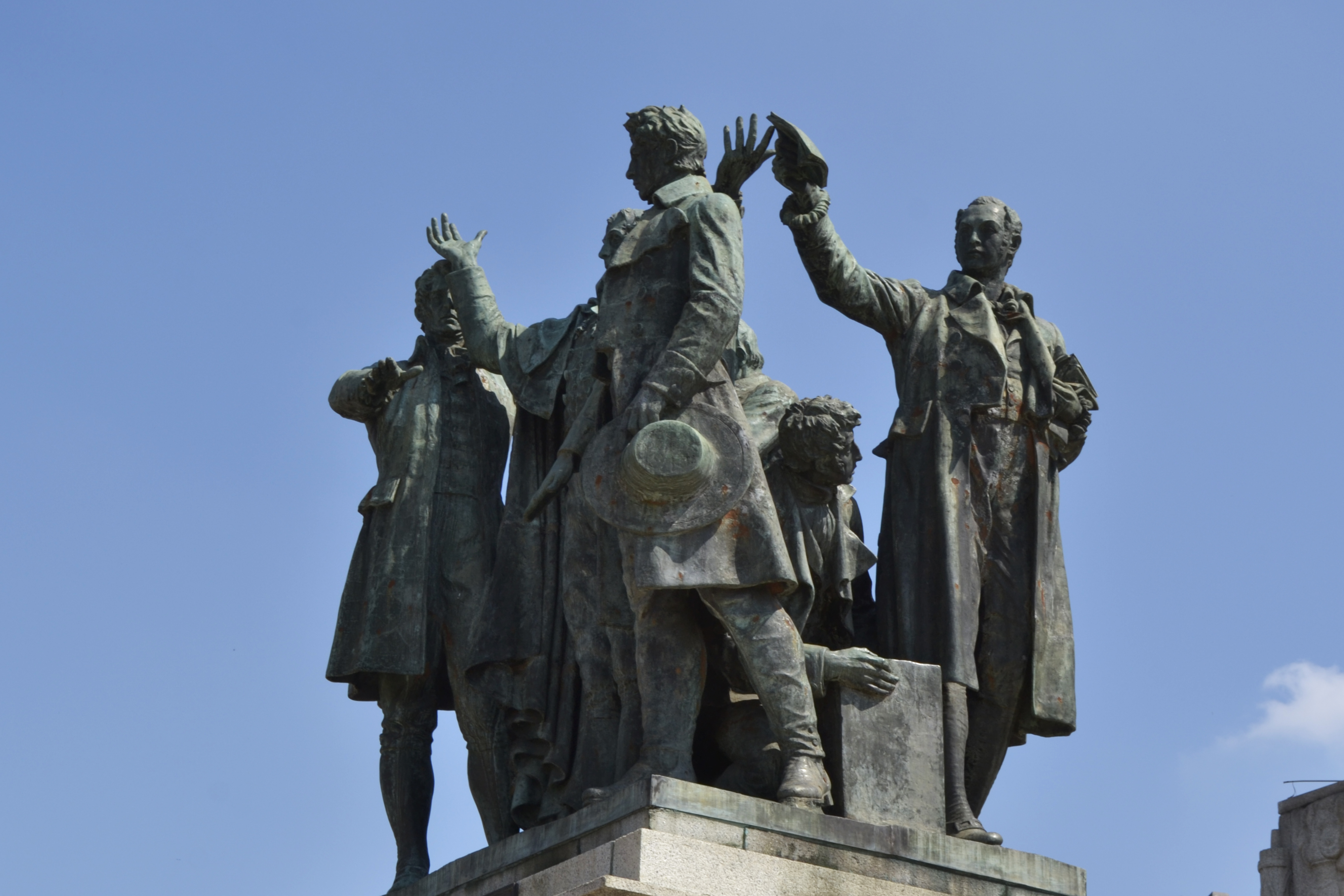
The Pernambuco revolutionaries

=== The four corner figures ===
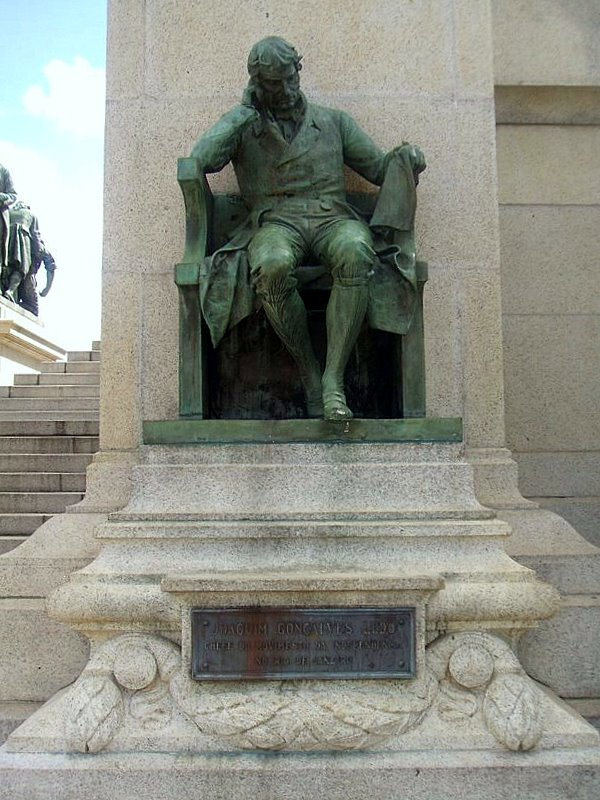
Joaquim Gonçalves Ledo,
leader of the independence movement in Rio de Janeiro

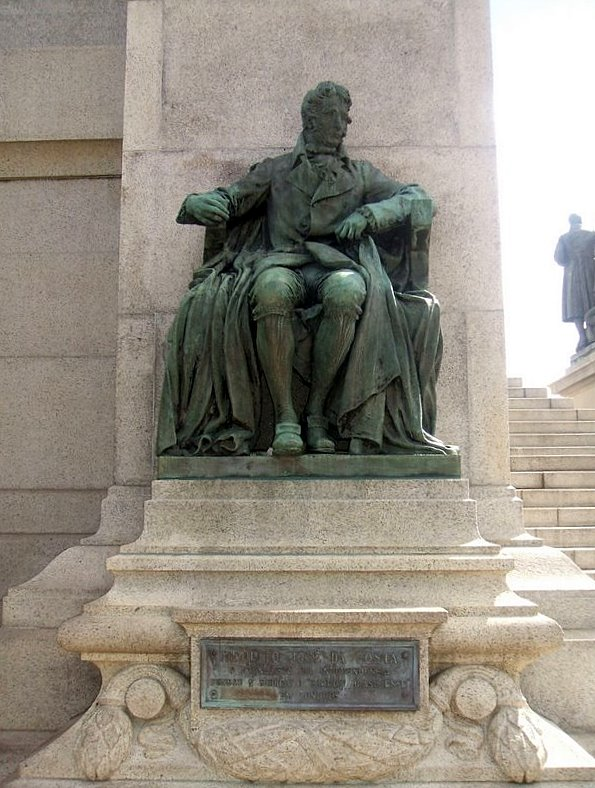
Hipólito da Costa,
the "father of Brazilian press"

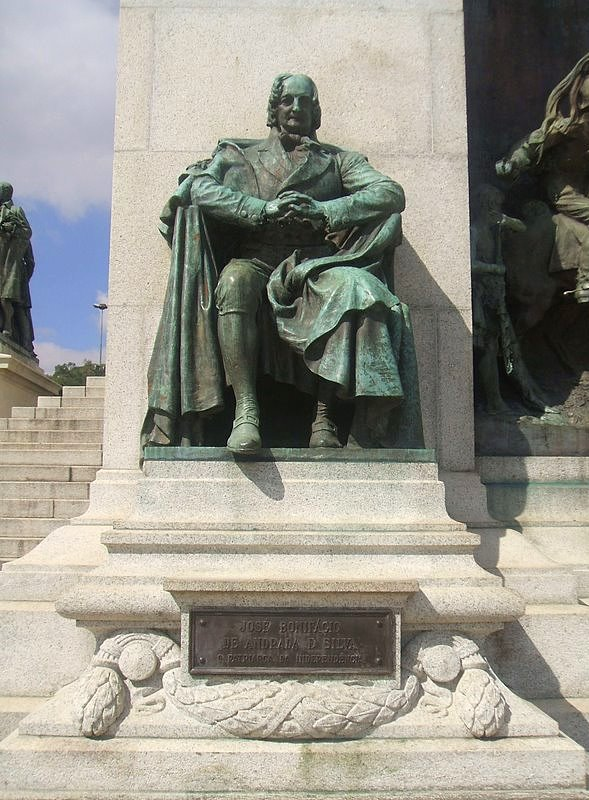
José Bonifácio,
the "patriarch of independence"

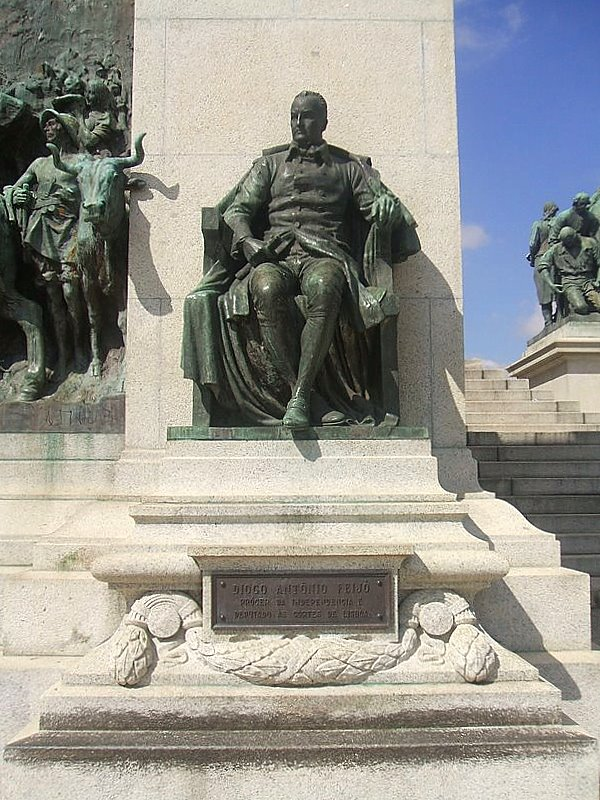
Diogo Antônio Feijó,
regent of the Empire of Brazil

== See also ==
Burial places of members of the Brazilian imperial family
