= Burial places of members of the Brazilian imperial family =

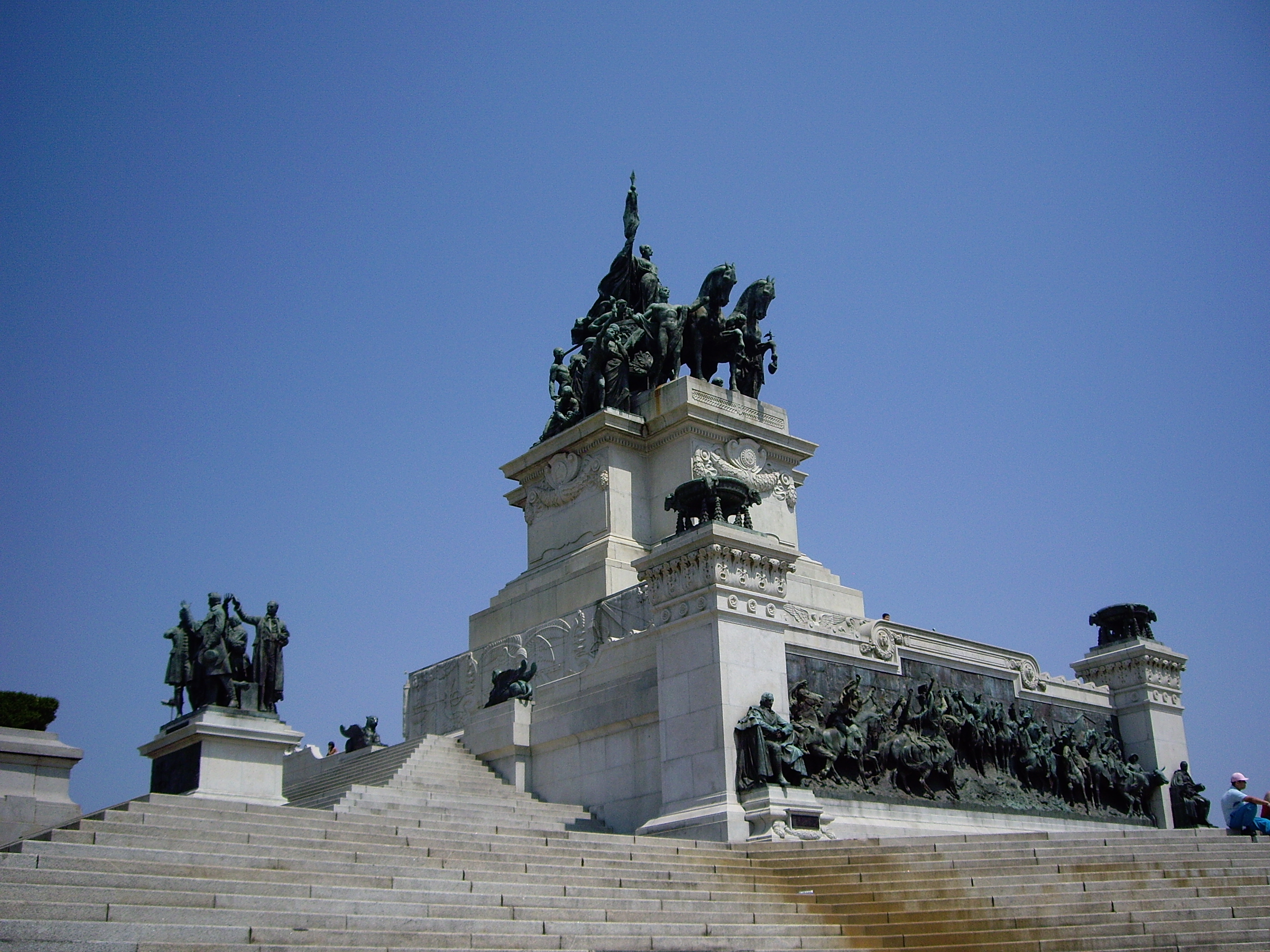
The Monument to the Independence of Brazil (pictured) houses the Imperial Crypt and Chapel, the burial site of Emperor Pedro I of Brazil and his consorts

This list details the burial sites of the monarchs of the Empire of Brazil, their immediate families, (Note: Consisting of the spouses and children of the Emperors of Brazil.) and the heirs apparent or presumptive to the throne (the Prince or Princess Imperial), together with their immediate families. Reflecting the dynasty’s history of exile and international dynastic ties, these sites are distributed between Brazil and several European nations. While the remains of the sovereigns and certain high-ranking members of the Brazilian imperial family were eventually repatriated to Brazil, others remain interred in countries such as Portugal, France, Italy, and Germany, situated within royal pantheons, mausoleums, churches, or municipal cemeteries.

== In Brazil ==
=== Imperial Crypt and Chapel, Monument to the Independence of Brazil, São Paulo ===
Name	Death	Notes	Grave image
Pedro I Emperor of Brazil	24 September 1834	Emperor Pedro I of Brazil (who also reigned as King Pedro IV of Portugal) was initially interred in the Royal Pantheon of the House of Braganza in Lisbon, Portugal. In 1972, his remains were repatriated to Brazil and reinterred in the Imperial Crypt and Chapel, situated beneath the Monument to the Independence of Brazil in São Paulo. His heart, however, was placed in the Church of Our Lady of Lapa in Porto, Portugal. (Note: Pedro requested the separation and entombment of his heart in Porto to honor the city's loyalty during the Liberal Wars. A constitutionalist stronghold, the city endured the Siege of Porto (1832–1833) while Pedro acted as regent for his daughter, Maria II, during the dynastic struggle against his brother, Miguel.) The embalmed organ, preserved in formaldehyde, is kept in a gilded silver urn enclosed within a mahogany and black velvet-lined case.	
Maria Leopoldina of Austria Empress consort of Brazil	11 December 1826	Empress Maria Leopoldina (who also served as Queen consort of Portugal during her husband's brief reign as King Pedro IV) was initially interred in the Convent of Ajuda in Rio de Janeiro. Following the convent's demolition in 1911, her coffin was moved to the Convent of Saint Anthony in the same city. In 1954, her remains were permanently transferred to the Imperial Crypt and Chapel beneath the Monument to the Independence of Brazil in São Paulo.	
Amélie of Leuchtenberg Empress consort of Brazil	26 January 1873	Amélie of Leuchtenberg, the second Empress consort of Brazil, died in Lisbon in 1873 and was initially interred in the Royal Pantheon of the House of Braganza. In 1982, her remains were repatriated to Brazil and moved to the Imperial Crypt and Chapel in São Paulo, where they were placed in a burial niche near her husband's sarcophagus.	

=== Imperial Mausoleum, Cathedral of Saint Peter of Alcantara, Petrópolis ===
Name	Death	Notes	Grave image
Pedro II Emperor of Brazil	5 December 1891	Pedro II, the final Emperor of Brazil, died in Paris during his exile in 1891. Following a state funeral in the French capital, his coffin was transported by train to Lisbon and interred in the Royal Pantheon of the House of Braganza. After the 1920 revocation of the banishment decree against the imperial family, his remains were officially repatriated to his homeland. The coffin was initially housed in the former Imperial Chapel before being transferred, in 1939, to the newly completed Imperial Mausoleum within the Cathedral of Saint Peter of Alcantara in Petrópolis.	
Teresa Cristina of the Two Sicilies Empress consort of Brazil	28 December 1889	Empress Teresa Cristina was initially interred in the Royal Pantheon of the House of Braganza, where her remains lay from 1889 until 1921. That year, they were returned to the country alongside those of her husband, Pedro II, for eventual interment in the Imperial Mausoleum within the Cathedral of Saint Peter of Alcantara in Petrópolis.	
Isabel of Braganza Princess Imperial of Brazil	14 November 1921	Princess Isabel was unable to return to her homeland immediately following the 1920 repeal of the banishment decree due to her declining health. She died in France the following year and was initially interred in the Royal Chapel of Dreux, the traditional burial site of the House of Orléans. In 1953, her remains were repatriated, and in 1971, they were placed within the Imperial Mausoleum in Petrópolis.	
Gaston of Orléans, Count of Eu Prince Imperial consort of Brazil	28 August 1922	The Count of Eu died at sea in 1922 while traveling to participate in the centenary celebrations of Brazilian independence. Like his wife, he was interred in the Royal Chapel of Dreux. In 1953, his coffin and that of Princess Isabel were returned to the country; the couple's remains were eventually moved to the Imperial Mausoleum in 1971.	
Pedro de Alcântara of Orléans-Braganza Prince of Grão-Pará	29 January 1940	The remains of the Prince of Grão-Pará were initially laid to rest in the municipal cemetery of Petrópolis, where they remained from 1940 until 1990. In that year, his coffin, along with that of his wife, was transferred to the Imperial Mausoleum and placed within a simple floor vault.	

=== Convent of Saint Anthony, Rio de Janeiro ===
Name	Death	Notes	Grave image
Paula of Braganza Princess of Brazil	16 January 1833		
Afonso of Braganza Prince Imperial of Brazil	11 June 1847	Prince Afonso was interred in the Convent of Ajuda in Rio de Janeiro. Following the convent's demolition in 1911, his remains were moved to the mausoleum within the Convent of Saint Anthony in the same city.	
Pedro Afonso of Braganza Prince Imperial of Brazil	10 January 1850		
Maria Amélia of Braganza Princess of Brazil	4 February 1853	Princess Maria Amélia was initially interred alongside her father in the Royal Pantheon of the House of Braganza. Nearly 130 years later, in 1982, her remains were returned to Brazil and placed within the Convent of Saint Anthony in Rio de Janeiro.	
Luiza Vitória of Orléans-Braganza (Note: Stillborn daughter of Princess Isabel and the Count of Eu) Princess of Brazil	28 July 1874		

== In Portugal ==
=== Royal Pantheon of the House of Braganza, Monastery of São Vicente de Fora, Lisbon ===
Name	Death	Notes	Grave image
Maria II of Portugal Princess Imperial of Brazil	15 November 1853	Maria II of Portugal, the eldest child of Pedro I, was the only European monarch born in the Americas. Having been born in Rio de Janeiro during the period of the United Kingdom of Portugal, Brazil and the Algarves, she became Princess Imperial of Brazil following Brazil's independence in 1822 and held that position until the birth of her brother, the future Emperor Pedro II, in 1825. She later remained in the Brazilian line of succession until she was excluded from it by Brazilian law in 1835. Unlike her father and other family members whose remains were eventually repatriated to Brazil, her remains were not repatriated and remain interred in the Royal Pantheon of the House of Braganza in Lisbon, where she was buried as the reigning Queen of Portugal.	

== In France ==
=== Royal Chapel of Dreux, Dreux ===
Name	Death	Notes	Grave image
Francisca of Braganza Princess of Brazil	27 March 1898		
Luís of Orléans-Braganza Prince of Brazil	26 March 1920		
Antônio Gastão of Orléans-Braganza Prince of Brazil	29 November 1918		

=== Père Lachaise Cemetery, Paris ===
Name	Death	Notes	Grave image
Januária of Braganza Princess Imperial of Brazil	13 March 1901		
Louis of Bourbon-Two Sicilies, Count of Aquila Prince Imperial consort of Brazil	5 March 1897		
Luigi of Bourbon-Two Sicilies, Count of Roccaguglielma Prince of Brazil	27 November 1909		
Philip of Bourbon-Two Sicilies, Count of Espina Prince of Brazil	9 July 1922		

== In Italy ==
=== Basilica of Santa Chiara, Naples ===
Name	Death	Notes	Grave image
Maria Isabella of Bourbon-Two Sicilies Princess of Brazil	14 February 1859		
Emanuele of Bourbon-Two Sicilies Prince of Brazil	26 January 1851		

== In Germany ==
=== St. Augustine's Church, Coburg ===
Name	Death	Notes	Grave image
Leopoldina of Braganza Princess of Brazil	7 February 1871		
Pedro Augusto of Saxe-Coburg and Gotha Prince of Brazil	6 July 1934		
Augusto Leopoldo of Saxe-Coburg and Gotha Prince of Brazil	11 October 1922		

== See also ==
Burial places of Portuguese royalty

== Bibliography ==
- Macaulay, Neill (1986). Dom Pedro: The Struggle for Liberty in Brazil and Portugal, 1798–1834. Durham, North Carolina: Duke University Press. ISBN 978-0-8223-0681-8.
- Sousa, Octávio Tarquínio de (1972). A vida de D. Pedro I (in Portuguese). Vol. 3. Rio de Janeiro: José Olímpio.
- Carvalho, José Murilo de (2007). D. Pedro II: ser ou não ser (in Portuguese). São Paulo: Companhia das Letras. ISBN 978-85-359-0969-2.
- Calmon, Pedro (1975). História de D. Pedro II (in Portuguese). Vol. 1–5. Rio de Janeiro: José Olímpio.
- Schwarcz, Lilia Moritz (1998). As barbas do Imperador: D. Pedro II, um monarca nos trópicos (in Portuguese) (2nd ed.). São Paulo: Companhia das Letras. ISBN 978-85-7164-837-1.
- Barman, Roderick J. (2002). Princess Isabel of Brazil: gender and power in the nineteenth century. Wilmington: Scholarly Resources. ISBN 978-0-8420-2846-2.
- Schiavo, José (1953). "A família Imperial do Brasil". Anuário do Museu Imperial (in Portuguese). XIV. Rio de Janeiro: Ministério da Educação e Saúde: 111–247.
- Almeida, Sylvia Lacerda Martins de (1973). Uma filha de D. Pedro I: Dona Maria Amélia (in Portuguese). São Paulo: Companhia Editora Nacional. OCLC 633948363.
- Schmidt, Maria Junqueira (1927). Amelia de Leuchtenberg: A segunda imperatriz do Brasil (in Portuguese). São Paulo: Companhia Melhoramento de São Paulo.
