= Pedro I's heart =

Preserved organ

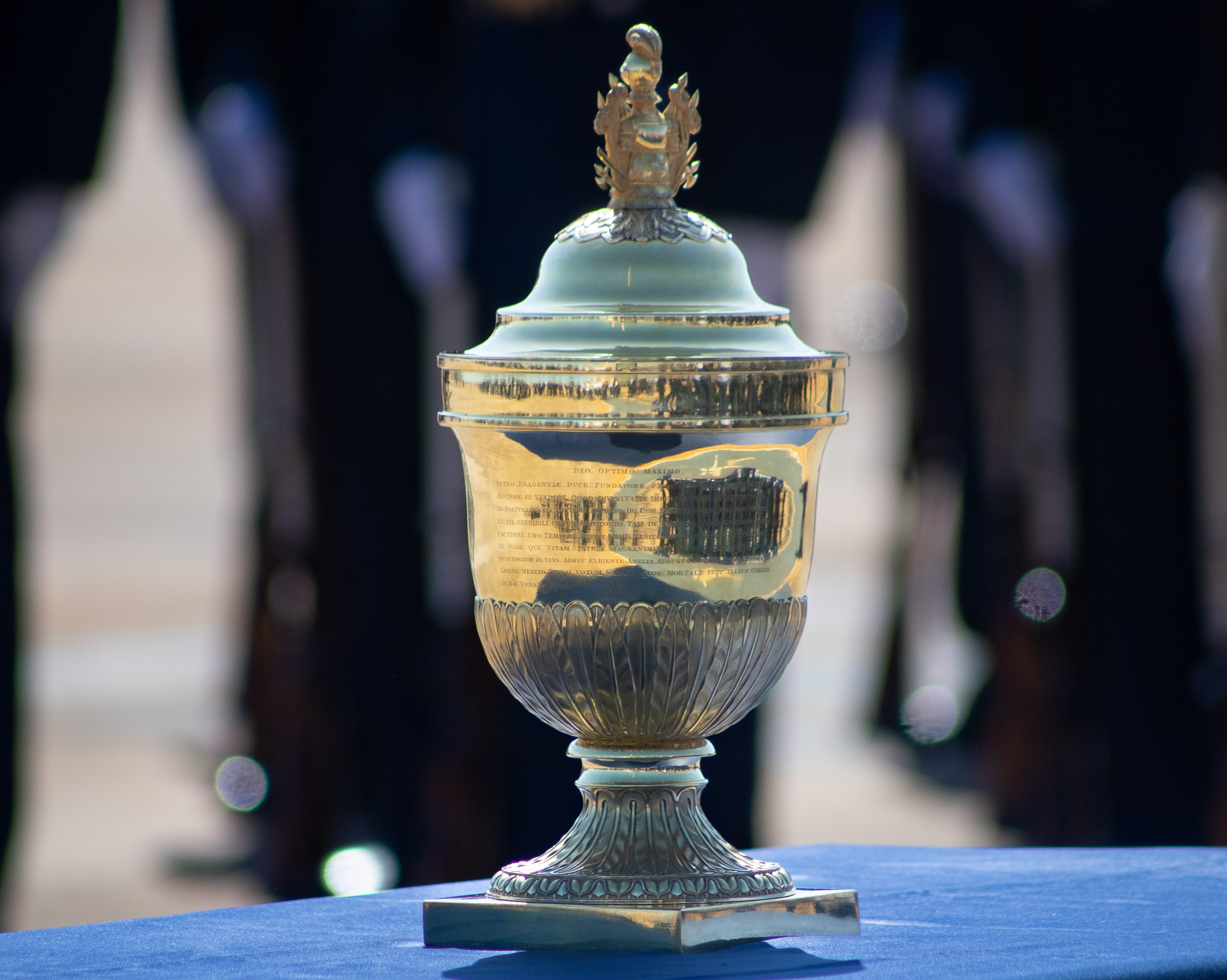
- The jar containing Pedro I's heart being displayed during Brazil's bicentennial celebrations, 2022
- Created: 19th century
- Present location: Church of Our Lady of Lapa, Porto, Portugal

The heart of the Brazilian emperor Pedro I has been preserved since his death in 1834. The organ is kept in a glass jar, with formaldehyde, in the Church of Our Lady of Lapa. The container is kept in an urn, under lock and key. The heart is considered a relic by the Portuguese government.

Pedro I's remains are buried in São Paulo, in the crypt of the Monument to the Independence. By decision of the monarch himself, as one of his last requests in life, the heart was separated and kept in Portugal. Pedro I asked that the heart be preserved in Porto because of the relevance of the city in the civil war for the Portuguese throne between Pedro I (known as Pedro IV in Portugal) and his brother Miguel.

After the emperor's death from tuberculosis in September 1834, a series of royal and ecclesiastical agreements were made so that, in February 1835, the heart was finally sent to Porto, kept in a gilded silver vase, wrapped in a black velvet-lined case, inside the Church of Our Lady of Lapa.

In 2022, after its exhibition in the context of the Bicentennial of Brazil's Independence, it was reported that the organ has a swollen appearance, possibly due to the material initially used in its conservation by doctor João Fernandes Tavares, before being kept in formaldehyde. The conditions of the heart are the subject of research in the field of forensic anthropology.

== History ==
=== Background ===
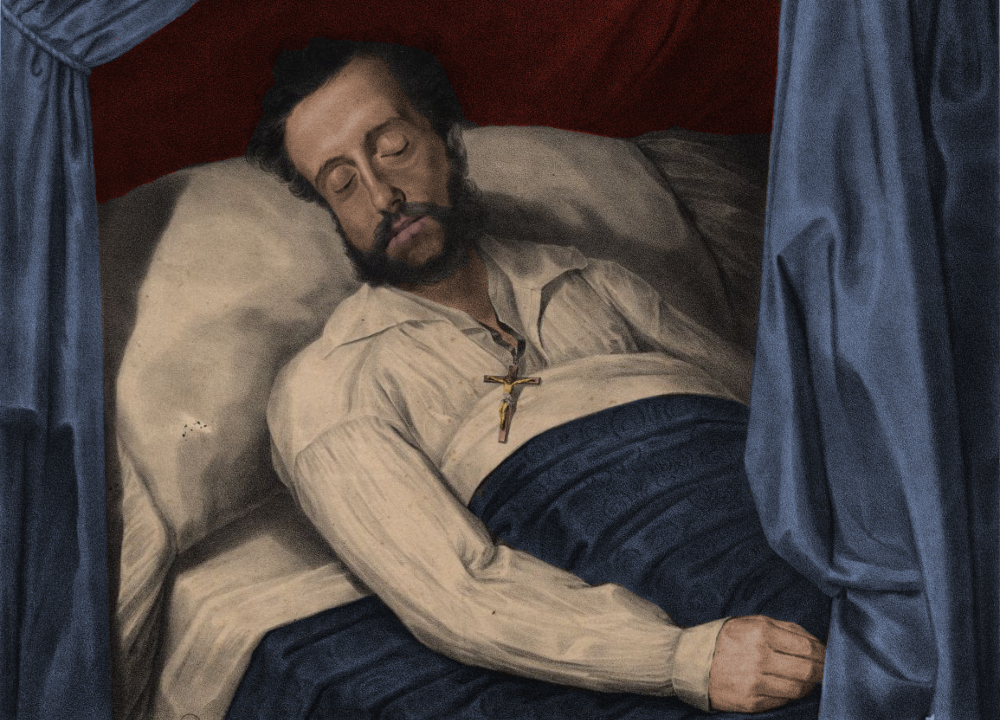
Dom Pedro I on his deathbed, by José Joaquim Rodrigues Primavera, 1834.

On September 23, 1834, on the eve of his death, Dom Pedro I wrote a letter addressed to the Brazilian people, (Note: This letter was published posthumously in Brazil, in January 1835, by the "Tipografia Fluminense de Brito & C.", owned by Paula Brito. The title of the publication states that the letter was sent by "doctor T******", probably referring to doctor João Fernandes Tavares, the Emperor's personal physician during the last years of his life.) in which he declares his wish regarding the fate of his remains after death:

Brazilians! I leave my heart to the heroic City of Porto, theater of my true glory, and the rest of my mortal spoils to the City of Lisbon, place of my birth; but you possess the most precious relic, the living emanation of my being, my son! My only son!

Dom Pedro was not the first monarch to determine, while he was still alive, that his heart should be separated from his body and preserved or buried. Even during the Middle Ages, monarchs such as Robert I of Scotland, Richard I of England, and Henry I of England had their hearts buried in different locations than the rest of their bodies.

=== The death of Dom Pedro and the arrival in the city of Porto ===
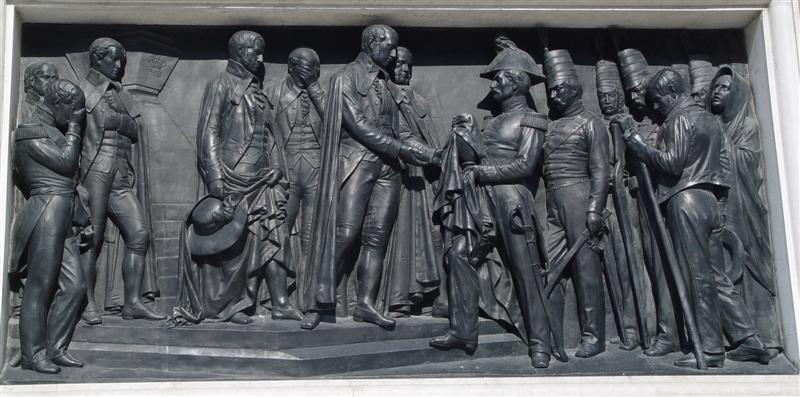
Bas-relief from 1866 on the statue of Dom Pedro in Praça da Liberdade, in Porto, depicting the relic's arrival in the city

After Dom Pedro died of tuberculosis, his daughter, Maria II of Portugal, decided to fulfill her father's wish. As narrated by Amélie of Leuchtenberg, Dom Pedro's widow, in a letter to her daughter Januária of Braganza, an autopsy of the body was performed, revealing a swollen and heavy right lung and an enlarged-looking heart. The exhumation of Dom Pedro's remains, performed in 2013 by a team from the Museum of Archaeology and Ethnology at the University of São Paulo, determined that part of the ribs on the right side of the body had been cut, probably for the removal of the heart during the time of autopsy and embalming.

However, the late emperor had not made it clear in which part of the city of Porto his heart should be kept, and soon a dispute ensued. The queen, Maria II, and the then bishop of Lisbon, Francisco de São Luís, had chosen the Lapa Church, which had been frequented frequently by Pedro. However, the Porto City Council had favored the chapel of São Vicente in the Sé of Porto.

Finally, the decision was made in February 1836 that the relic of the heart would finally be kept at Lapa. On February 4, the heart set sail across the Tagus River toward the city of Porto aboard the warship Jorge IV, commanded by Colonel Baltazar de Almeida Pimentel and a guard of honor composed of 70 soldiers.

Arriving in Ribeira after a 3-day trip, the delegation was received with an official ceremony, where the urn containing the heart was handed over to the Chamber of Porto, along with its key.

The original urn was composed of an outer part made of mahogany and an inner part made of silver. Later, the heart was placed inside a hermetically sealed glass vase, which is contained inside the silver urn.

== Bicentennial of Brazilian Independence ==
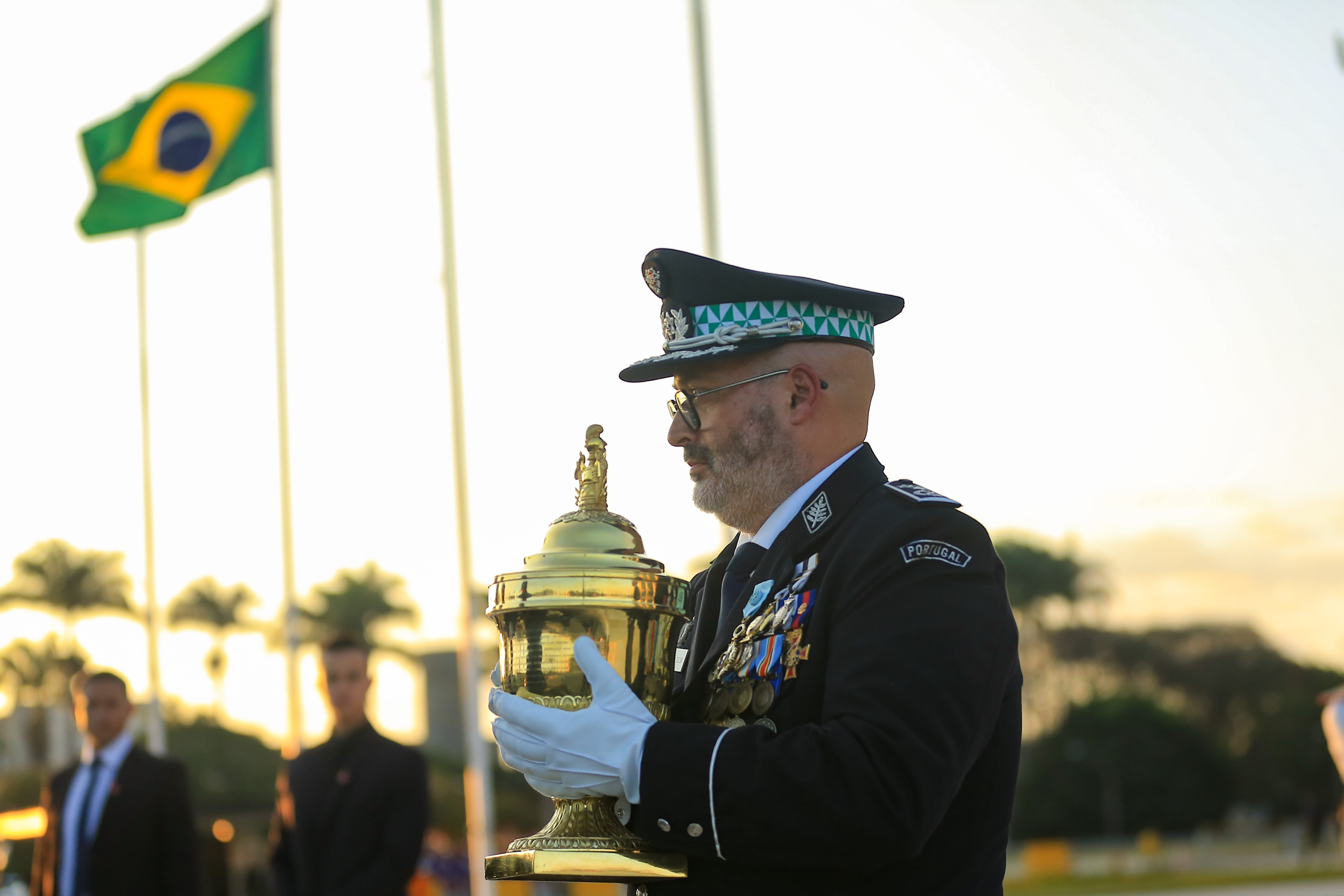
The ceremony of the arrival of Dom Pedro I's heart in Brazil, in 2022

Video about the exhibition of Dom Pedro I's heart in Brasília, in the context of Brazil's Independence Bicentennial.

In the context of the bicentennial celebrations of the Independence of Brazil, Dom Pedro I's heart was transported to Brazil and exhibited in Brasília.

The coming of the body to Brazil was idealized by Nise Yamaguchi in the first half of 2022, in dialogue with President Jair Bolsonaro, and the descendants of Dom Pedro, Federal Deputy Luiz Philippe of Orléans-Braganza and Bertrand of Orléans-Braganza, Head of the Imperial House of Brazil. The deputy, great-great-great-grandson of Dom Pedro I, is said to have traveled to Porto, where he made contact with those responsible for the Lapa Church and with members of the City Council. The Brazilian Embassy in Lisbon and the Brazilian consulate got involved in the negotiation, proposing that the heart be temporarily loaned for the bicentennial festivities.

Both the City Council and the Third Order of Lapa showed no opposition to the proposal, provided that the safety of the heart was ensured. The President of the Portuguese Republic, Marcelo Rebelo de Sousa, had been consulted, and suggested that the loan of the relic be in fact carried out. To ensure that the heart would not be damaged during transport to Brazil, an expert study was ordered by the National Institute of Legal Medicine, conducted by researchers from the Faculty of Medicine of the University of Porto and the Abel Salazar Biomedical Sciences Institute. The study concluded that there would be no risk to the relic, provided it was transported in a pressurized chamber on the plane.

Thus, in a session on July 18, the Porto City Council unanimously approved the proposal for the loan of the heart. The approved proposal considers that all costs related to transport will be the responsibility of the Brazilian government, and establishes the legal basis for the effective transfer of the relic.

On July 22, the heart was brought from Portugal in a Brazilian Air Force plane, and received with honors as head of state, transported in the presidential Rolls-Royce Silver Wraith, and escorted by the 1st Guard Cavalry Regiment. Finally, an official session was held with President Jair Bolsonaro on the ramp of the Planalto Palace.

The solemnity and the exposition of Dom Pedro I's heart were criticized, especially for the cost of the transfer and the morbidity of the tributes. It was also criticized the fact that, with the coming of the organ to Brazil, Dom Pedro I's last request was not respected, since he had asked for the heart to remain in Portugal.
