= Equestrian statue of Pedro I =

- Estátua equestre de D. Pedro I (Portuguese)
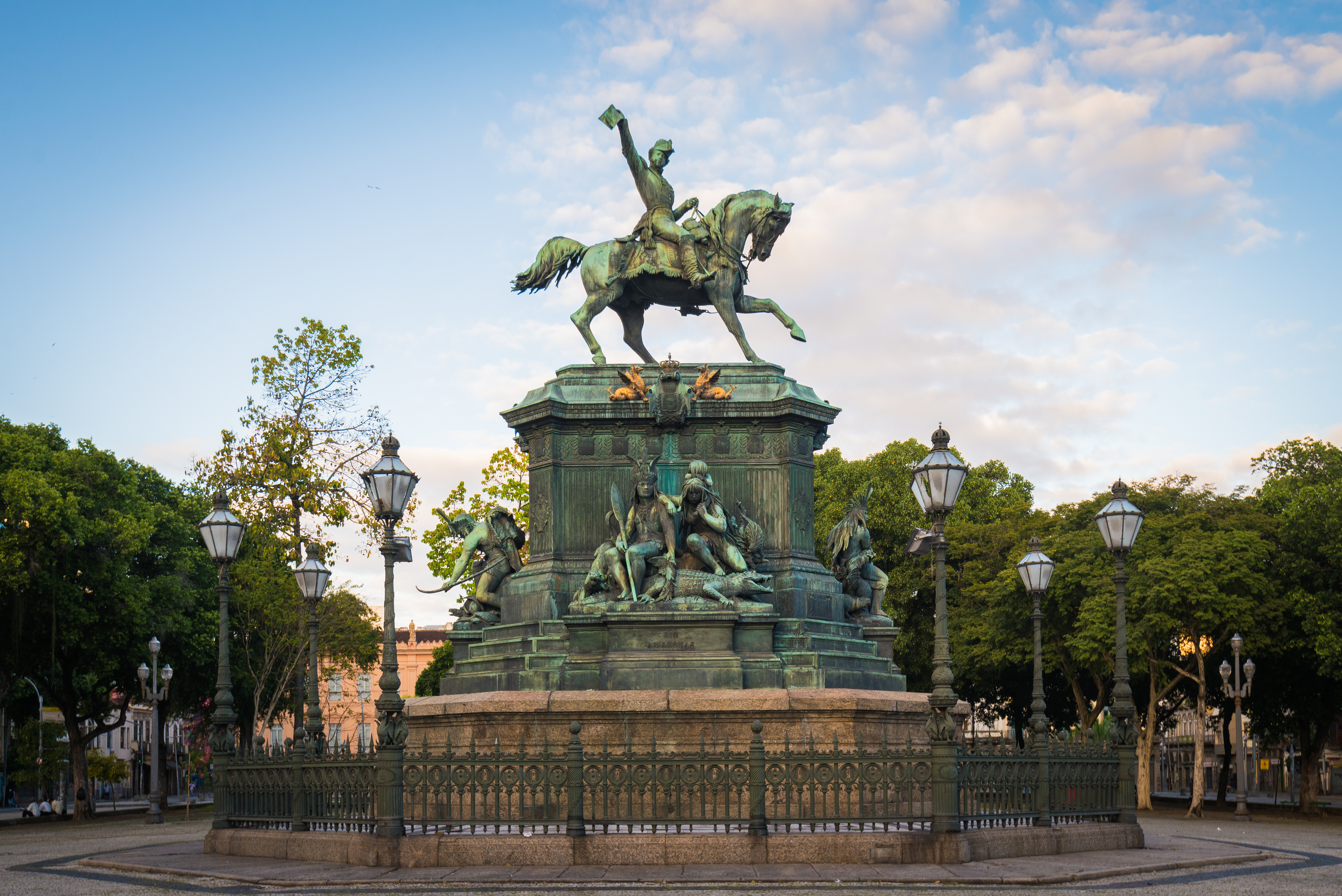
- Artist: João Maximiano Mafra; Louis Rochet
- Completion date: 30 March 1862
- Medium: Bronze
- Movement: Romanticism
- Dimensions: 6 m (240 in)
- Location: Rio de Janeiro, Brazil; 22°54′25″S 43°10′58″W

The equestrian statue of Pedro I is located in Tiradentes Square, in the city center of Rio de Janeiro, in the homonymous state, Brazil. It is a national historical heritage, listed by the National Institute of Historic and Artistic Heritage (IPHAN), since 4 March 1999. It is also a Rio de Janeiro state cultural heritage, registered by the Instituto Estadual do Patrimônio Cultural (INEPAC), since 26 September 1978.

== History ==
A monument in honor of emperor Pedro I of Brazil was idealized by the Senate since 1824, but due to the emperor's abdication in 1831 the project was abandoned.

In 1854, on the occasion of the thirtieth anniversary of Brazil's Independence, the Municipal Chamber of Rio de Janeiro, by proposal of Haddock Lobo, decided to erect the statue. The proposal was also approved by emperor Pedro II.

A contest was then held in 1855 by the Imperial Academy of Fine Arts to choose the project. The winning project was that of artist João Maximiano Mafra, at the time director of the Academy. Louis Rochet, winner of the third place, was chosen to execute and cast the bronze sculptures in Paris.

The place chosen for the monument was the Constituição Square (today Tiradentes Square), the same place where Pedro I swore the 1824 Constitution (in the São João Theatre) and also where Tiradentes was hanged on 21 April 1792.

The inauguration, first set to take place on 25 March 1862, the day in which emperor Pedro I issued the 1824 Brazilian Constitution, was postponed to 30 March due to heavy rains.

== Description ==
As a whole, it presents emperor Pedro I on a horse, waving the 1824 Constitutional Charter in his right hand, the Brazilian provinces at the time, as well as the four great rivers of Brazil — Amazon, Madeira, São Francisco and Paraná. The allegories feature indigenous people and various species of animals — tapirs, armadillos, anteaters, capybaras — as well as golden wyverns and various other decorative motifs.

On the main side, below the statue, it has the inscription "to D. Pedro I, gratitude of the Brazilian people". The base, 3.30 meters high, is made of Carioca granite; the pedestal, 6.40 meters high, is made of bronze and the statue, also made of bronze, is 6.00 meters high.

== Gallery ==
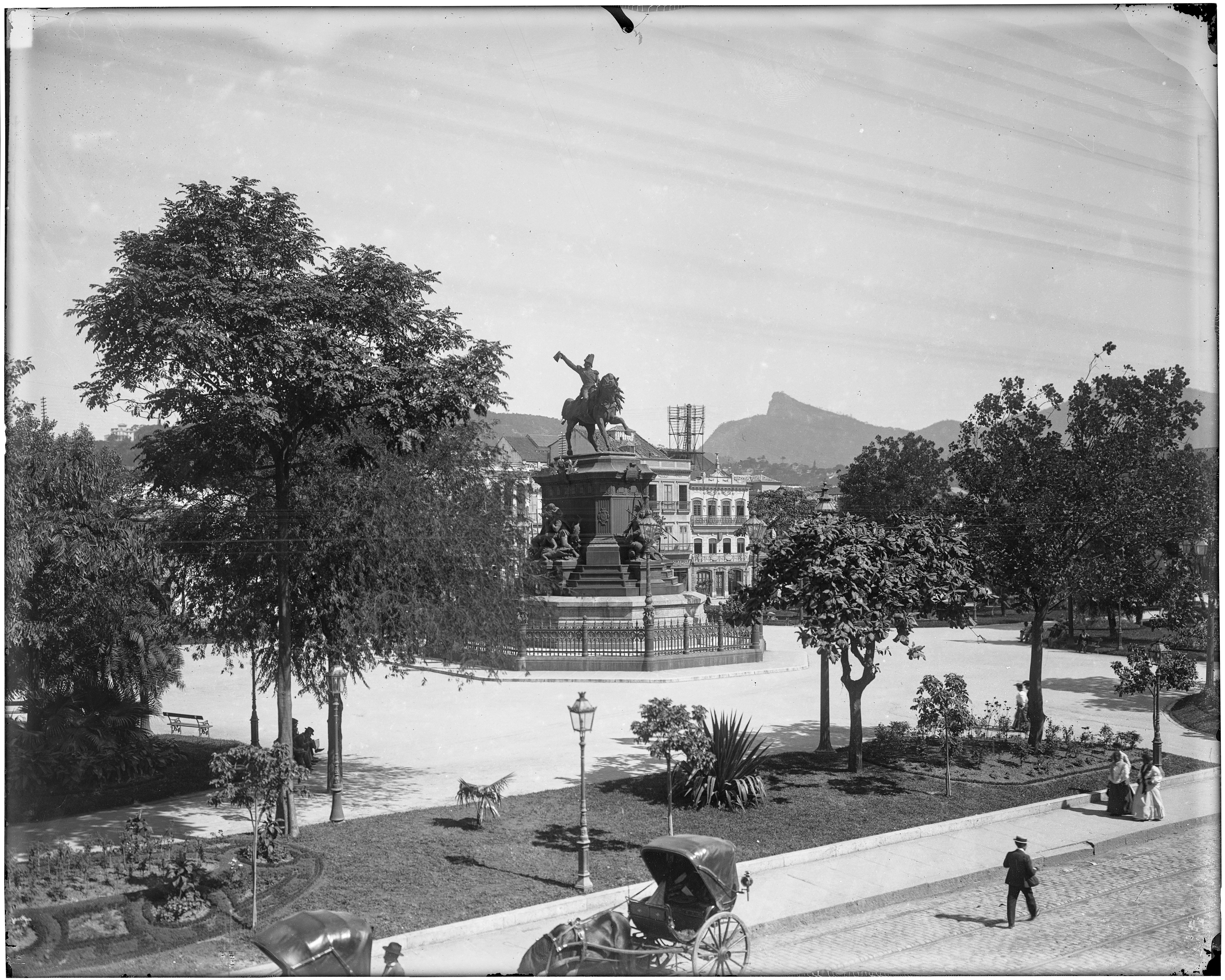
Pictured by Marc Ferrez, unknown date

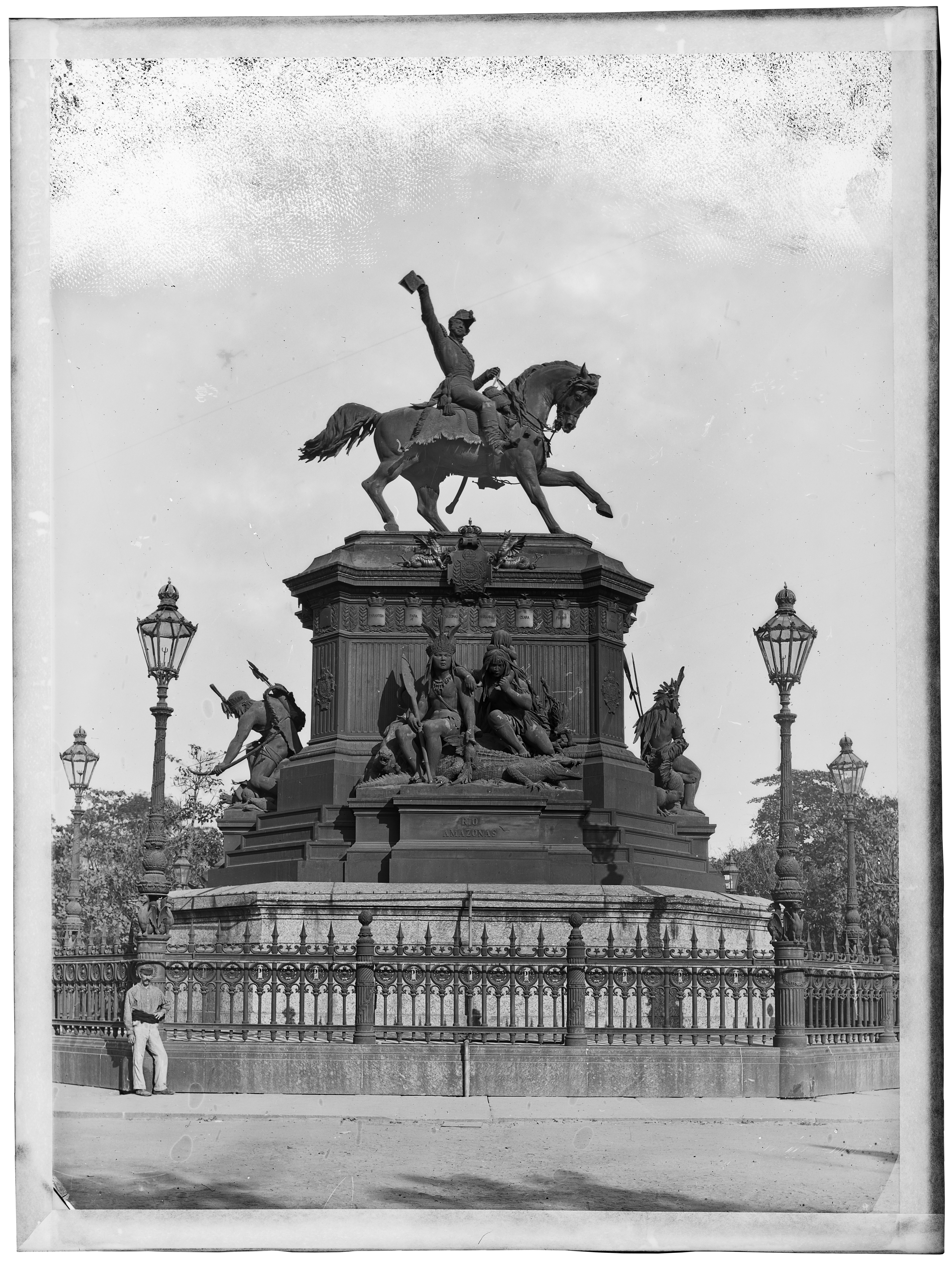
Picture by Marc Ferrez

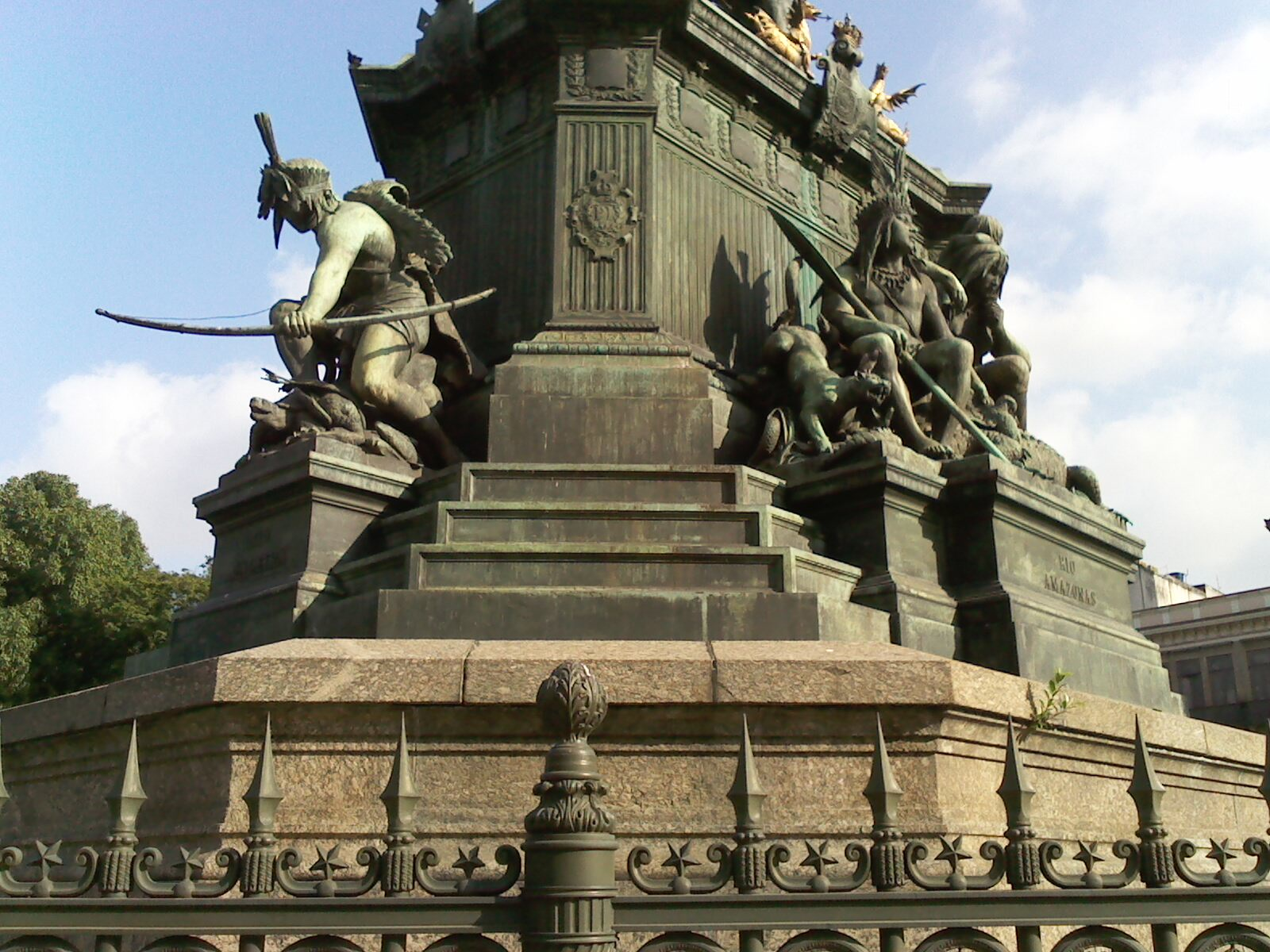
Allegories, Amazon River on the right

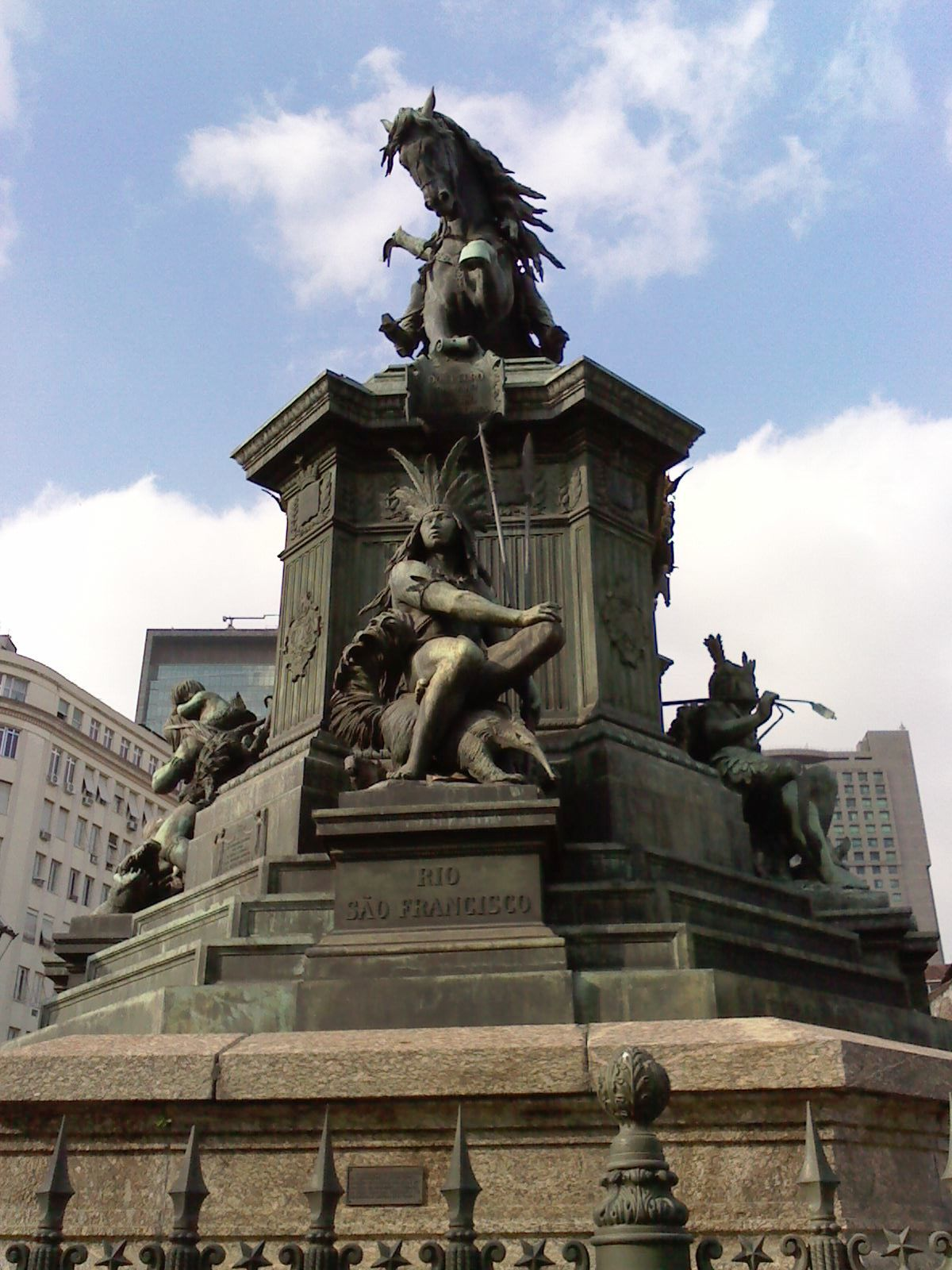
São Francisco River

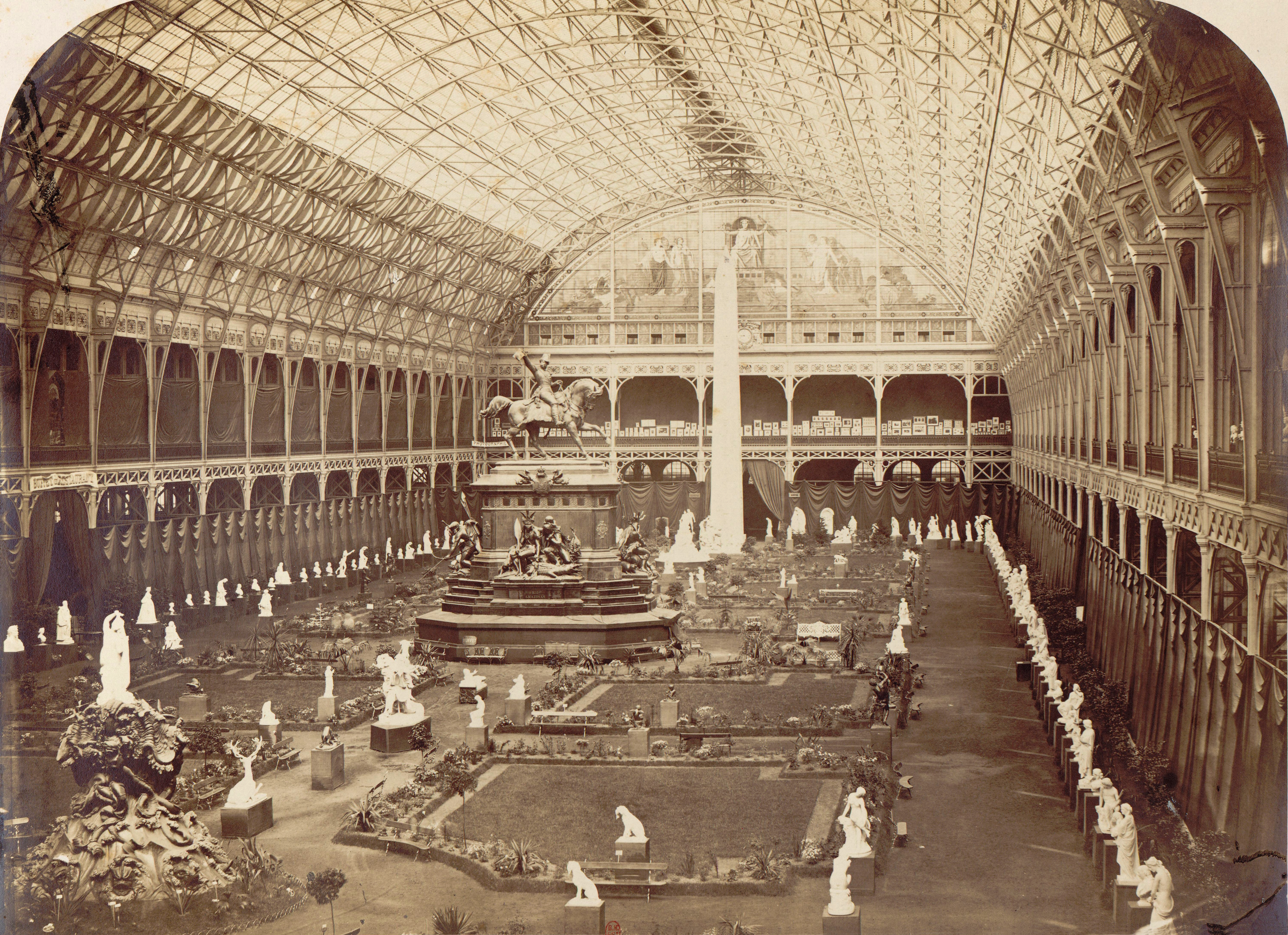
The statue in the 1861 Salon in Paris
