= Neill W. Macaulay Jr. =

American writer, academic, Cuban revolutionary (1935–2007)

- Born: April 10, 1935; South Carolina, US
- Died: October 28, 2007 (aged 72); Micanopy, Florida, US
- Education: University of Texas; The Citadel, The Military College of South Carolina
- Occupations: Writer, professor, revolutionary
- Organizations: University of Florida

Neill W. Macaulay Jr. (April 10, 1935, in South Carolina – October 28, 2007, in Micanopy, Florida) was a writer, professor and a former lieutenant in Fidel Castro's 26th of July Movement Army.

== Biography ==
Macaulay was a graduate of the University of Texas and The Citadel and served two years with the U.S. Army in the Korean War, where he managed the PX. After his army service, Macaulay joined the Cuban Revolution in 1958, to overthrow Fulgencio Batista. As Castro's forces closed in on Havana, in December 1958 Macaulay started training firing squads and was promoted to lieutenant. Members of Macaulay's unit included Rafael del Pino, who became chief of Cuba's air force, but later defected. After the revolution, Cuba gave Macaulay a tomato farm and he profitably shipped one crop to Pompano Beach, Florida. However, in 1961, when Castro announced intentions to control exports, Macaulay left for the U.S., where he had to fight a legal battle to retain his U.S. citizenship.

Macaulay then earned a doctorate from the University of Texas and began teaching at the University of Florida (1964–1986), where he became known as an expert in Latin American history. He retired from teaching in 1986.

Macaulay authored The Sandino Affair (1967) (a study of Nicaraguan resistance to U.S. occupation in the 1920–1930s), A Rebel in Cuba (1970), The Prestes Column (1974) and Dom Pedro: the struggle for liberty in Brazil and Portugal, 1798–1834 (1986, ISBN 978-0-8223-0681-8). He co-authored with David Bushnell The Emergence of Latin America in the Nineteenth Century (1988, 2nd: 1994, ISBN 0195084020).

Macaulay returned to Cuba in 1991, after being repeatedly denied entry by the Castro government. He later made various other trips as an academic. His experiences in Cuba helped inspire two documentaries: Cuba: A Lifetime of Passion (2007) and Patria o Muerte (still in production).
