= Colônia Leopoldina =

Colônia Leopoldina (Portuguese: Leopoldina colony) may refer to:

- Colônia Leopoldina, Alagoas, a municipality in Alagoas, Brazil
- Colônia Leopoldina, Bahia, a former colony in Bahia, Brazil
