= Colônia Leopoldina, Bahia =

Former settlement in Bahia, Brazil

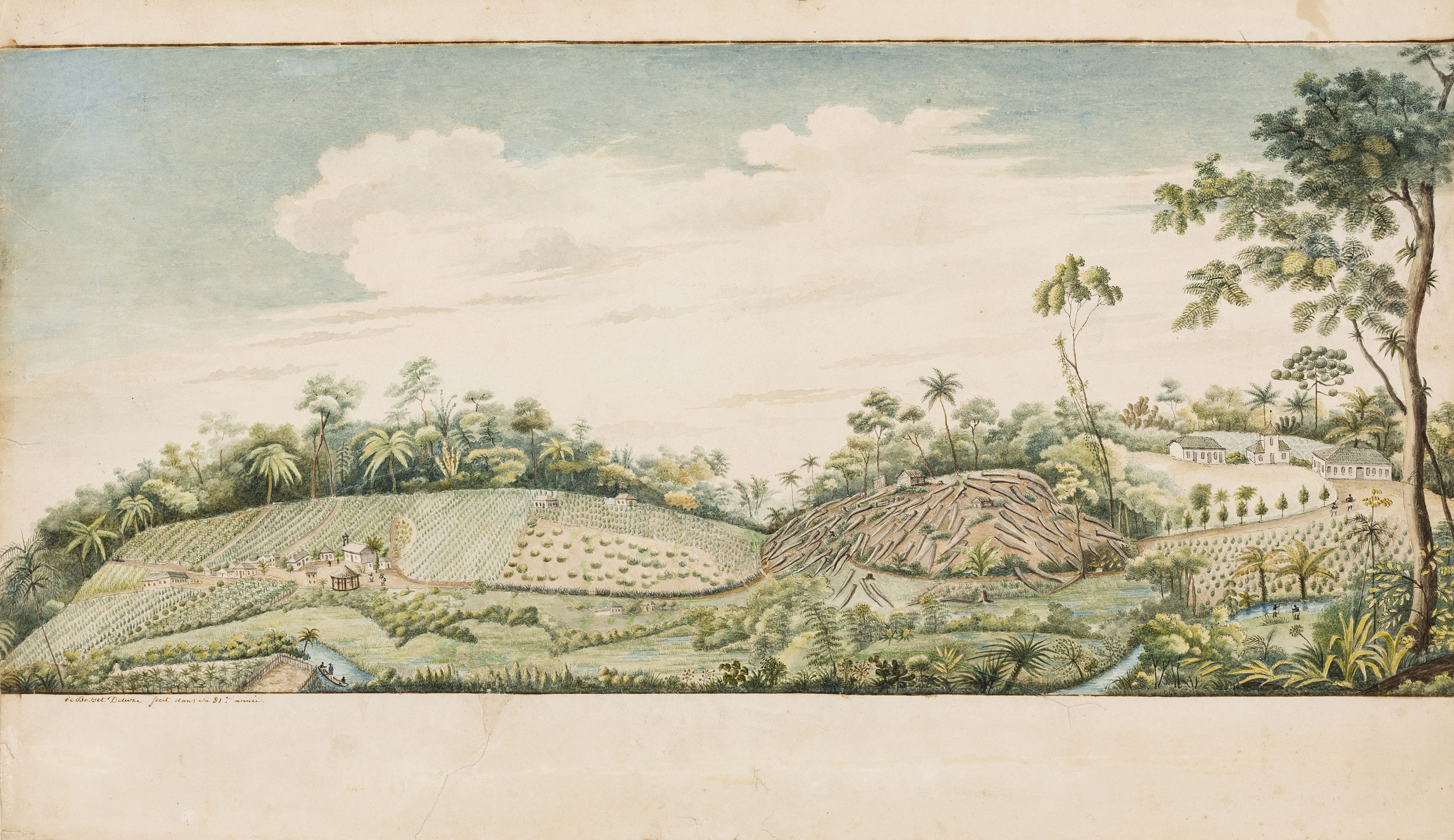
Pombal farm in Colônia Leopoldina.

Colônia Leopoldina (Portuguese: Leopoldina colony) was a German and Swiss settlement in the captaincy of Bahia founded in 1818 or 1819. The settlement began as a land grant given to six German and Swiss men after a series of incentives created by João VI to attract European immigration to Brazil. Colônia Leopoldina was intended to use free labor but devolved into a slave plantation and began to decline after the abolition of slavery in Brazil.

The modern-day district of Helvécia in Nova Viçosa is located on the former Colônia Leopoldina.

== Background ==
In 1808, João VI, the Prince of Brazil, started the Botocudo Wars against the Botocudo people to encourage European settlement around the Doce River in the borderlands of the captaincies of Bahia, Minas Gerais, and Espírito Santo. Between 1808 and 1819, João VI incentivised settlement in the region through offering sesmaria grants, debt forgiveness, royal tax relief, and land grants for foreigners to form agricultural colonies.

European immigration was desired by the Brazilian elite as a way to offset enslaved labor and economically develop uncolonised regions. The Brazilian elite saw the amount of Afro-Brazilians in Brazil as a threat.

== Establishment ==
Colônia Leopoldina was located in the modern-day municipality of Nova Viçosa in Bahia, Brazil.

In 1818 or 1819, (Note: Some sources give the founding of the settlement as 1818, whereas another says June 1819.) German naturalist Georg Wilhelm Freyreiss along with five other immigrants from Switzerland and Hamburg received land grants in Bahia. Colônia Leopoldina was established on a land grant of 2.5 leagues or 10,890 hectares (26,900 acres) on the bank of the Peruípe River. This land was heavily wooded and home to the Pataxó, Maxakali, and Puri people.

The settlement was named Colônia Leopoldina after Maria Leopoldina of Austria, the spouse of Pedro I of Brazil and future empress of Brazil.

=== Other settlements ===
In 1821 or 1822, German Georg Anton Schäffer, Swiss Jan Martins Flach, and João Filipe Henning received a sesmaria of 4,356 hectares (10,760 acres) and established a nearby colony named Frankental (German: Valley of the Franks) along with 20 other colonists from Franconia. Frankental was later absorbed into Colônia Leopoldina. Colônia Leopoldina was sometimes referred to as Colônia Leopoldina-Frankental.

Flach owned a nearby property named Nova Helvécia (Portuguese: New Helvetica), which was preserved in the name of Helvécia: a modern-day district of Nova Viçosa.

== Structure ==
The settlement was intended to be built on communal and collective farming. Families were allocated approximately 50 hectares (120 acres) per family along with shelter, seeds, and livestock, with the expectation that they'd stay for a minimum of 2 years and provide their harvest for 10 years so that they could be processed for export. According to Schäffer, the fields were initially prepared for agriculture by the Pataxó and Maxakali people.

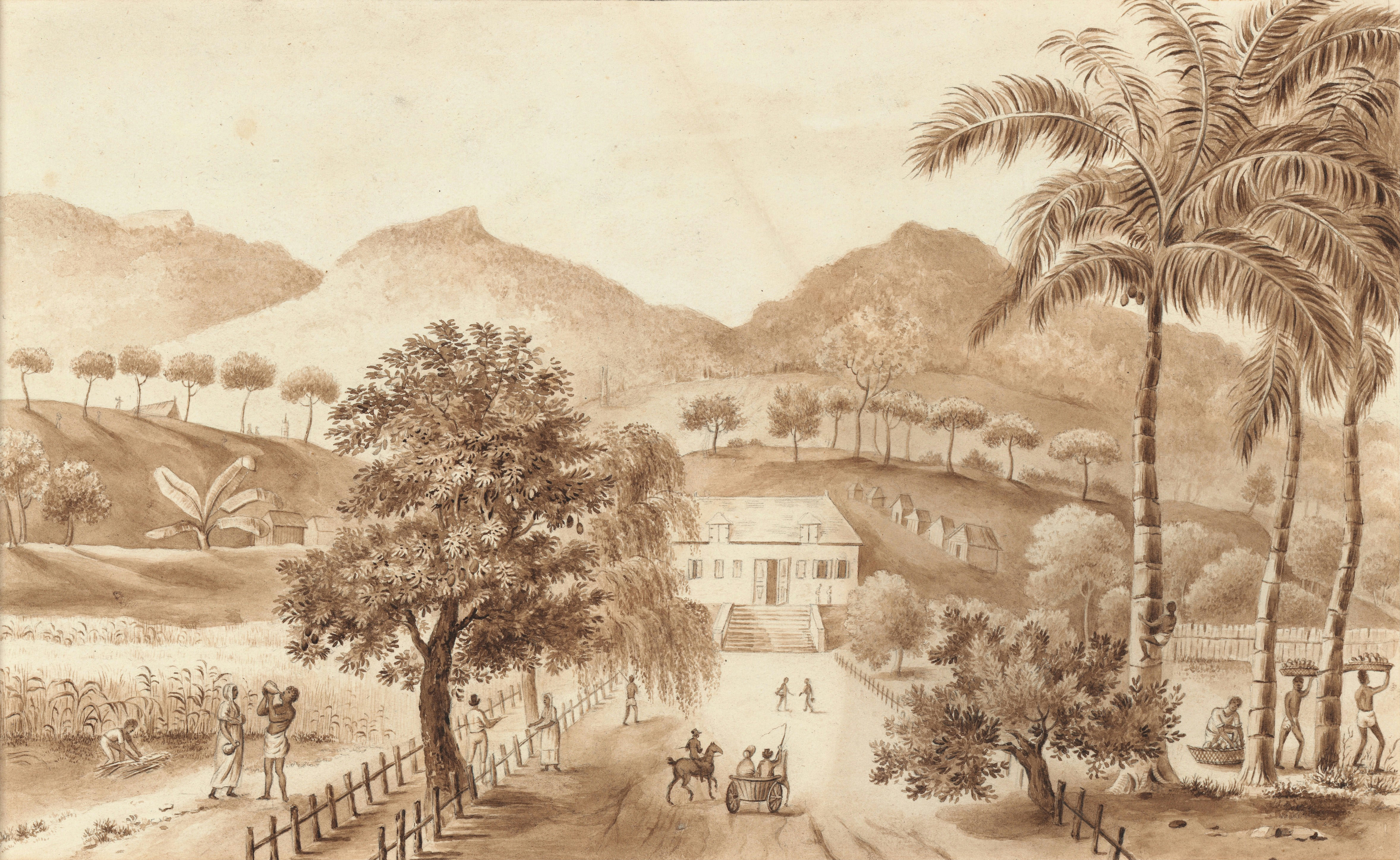
Fazenda Pombal in Colônia Leopoldina. Slave labor is visible on the left and right sides of the painting.

The exact introduction of slavery at Colônia Leopoldina is uncertain, with different sources placing the date around 1824 or 1825 after the death of Freyreiss. The decline of the collective farming model and the introduction of slavery may have happened due to a lack of additional European labor along with local attitudes regarding slave labor.

In 1832, Colônia Leopoldina had 86 free white residents and 489 enslaved Africans living amongst 18 plantations. In 1851, Colônia Leopoldina had 133 free residents and 1243 enslaved people living amongst 43 coffee plantations. In 1858, the settlement had 200 free Swiss, German, French, and Brazilian residents and around 2000 enslaved people living amongst 40 farms.

The introduction of slavery to Colônia Leopoldina led to conflict and complaint. Enslaved people escaped and established quilombos nearby, and fought back with an uprising in 1832. Brazilians and foreigners criticised the settlement for relying on slave labor rather than incentivizing European immigration. In 1861, authorities of the province of Bahia declared that "Colônia Leopoldina" no longer existed and was instead replaced by large coffee plantations managed by wealthy foreign proprietors and worked by enslaved Africans.

=== Coffee production ===
Coffee was the primary crop harvested at Colônia Leopoldina since its foundation. In 1824, Frankental and Leopoldina had 16,000 and 50,000 coffee crops, respectively. In 1852, Colônia Leopoldina was exporting 70,000 arrobas (Note: 1,050,000 kg / 2,314,854 lbs) of coffee. In 1858, they were exporting 100,000 arrobas (Note: 1,500,000 kg / 3,306,934 lbs) and had built a reputation for quality in Brazil and Europe. This coffee was known as "café de Caravelas" or "café Caravellas" (Caravelas coffee).

Colônia Leopoldina never produced more than 100,000 arrobas (Note: 1,500,000 kg / 3,306,934 lbs) of coffee a year.

== Decline ==
Colônia Leopoldina began to decline due to the abolition of slavery with the passage of Lei Áurea on 13 May 1888 and soil erosion. Some of the formerly enslaved Afro-Brazilians left Colônia Leopoldina for the cities in search of better lives, while others stayed behind and purchased plots of land from their former enslavers. The majority of the settlement's white population left, with some going to cities and others returning to their home countries.

A 1923 record notes that only a few descendants of the original colonists remained.

== See also ==
- Nova Friburgo, a municipality in Rio de Janeiro established in 1818 as a Swiss colony authorised by João VI
- São Leopoldo, a municipality in Rio Grande do Sul established in 1824 as a German colony
- São Pedro de Alcântara, a municipality in Santa Catarina established in 1829 as a German colony
