= Maria Leopoldina of Austria =

Empress of Brazil (1822–1826) and Queen of Portugal (1826)

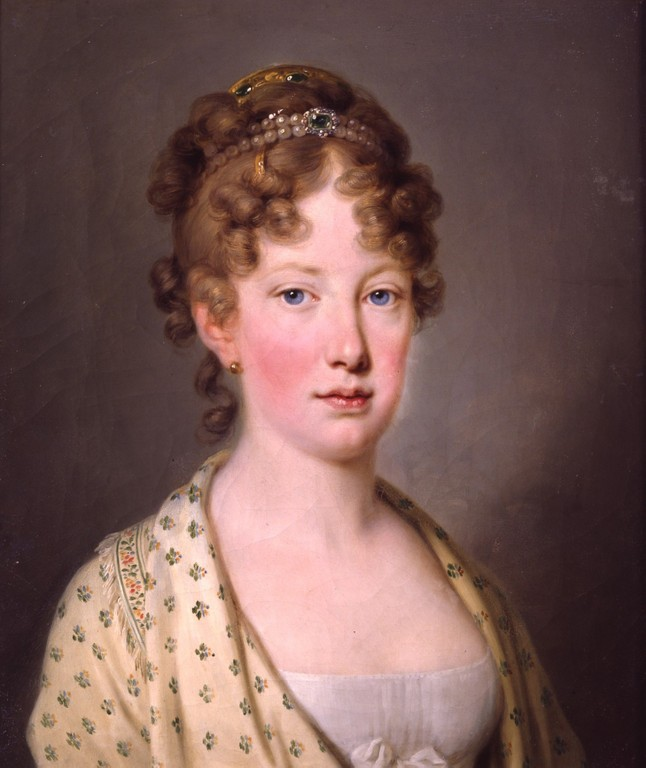
- Portrait by Joseph Kreutzinger, c. 1815

Empress consort of Brazil
- Tenure: 12 October 1822 – 11 December 1826

Queen consort of Portugal
- Tenure: 10 March 1826 – 2 May 1826
- Born: 22 January 1797; Hofburg, Vienna, Archduchy of Austria, Holy Roman Empire
- Died: 11 December 1826 (aged 29); Palace of São Cristóvão, Rio de Janeiro, Empire of Brazil
- Burial: 14 December 1826 Convent of Our Lady of Help, Rio de Janeiro; 9 November 1911 Convent of Saint Anthony, Rio de Janeiro; 12 October 1954 Monument to the Independence of Brazil, São Paulo
- Spouse: Pedro I of Brazil and IV of Portugal (m. 1817)
- Issue Detail: Maria II, Queen of Portugal; João Carlos, Prince of Beira; Januária, Princess Imperial of Brazil and Countess of Aquila; Princess Paula; Francisca, Princess of Joinville; Pedro II, Emperor of Brazil
Names
- German: Caroline Josepha Leopoldine Franziska Ferdinanda
- House: Habsburg-Lorraine
- Father: Francis II, Holy Roman Emperor
- Mother: Maria Theresa of Naples and Sicily

Dona Maria Leopoldina of Austria (22 January 1797 – 11 December 1826) was the first Empress of Brazil as the wife of Emperor Dom Pedro I from 12 October 1822 until her death. She was also Queen of Portugal during her husband's brief reign as King Dom Pedro IV from 10 March to 2 May 1826.

She was born in Vienna, Austria, the daughter of Holy Roman Emperor Francis II, and his second wife, Maria Theresa of Naples and Sicily. Among her many siblings were Emperor Ferdinand I of Austria and Marie Louise, Duchess of Parma, the wife of Napoleon Bonaparte.

The education Maria Leopoldina had received in childhood and adolescence was broad and eclectic, with a higher cultural level and more consistent political training. Such education of the little princes and princesses of the Habsburg family was based on the educational belief initiated by their grandfather Holy Roman Emperor Leopold II, who believed "that children should be inspired from an early age to have high qualities, such as humanity, compassion and the desire to make people happy". With a deep Christian faith and a solid scientific and cultural background (which included international politics and notions of government) the Archduchess had been prepared from an early age to being a proper royal consort.

In the 21st century, it has been proposed by some historians that she was one of the main articulators of the process of Independence of Brazil that took place in 1822. Her biographer, historian Paulo Rezzutti, maintains that it was largely thanks to her that Brazil became a nation. According to him, the wife of Dom Pedro "embraced Brazil as her country, Brazilians as her people and Independence as her cause". She was also adviser to Dom Pedro on important political decisions that reflected the future of the nation, such as the Dia do Fico and the subsequent opposition and disobedience to the Portuguese courts regarding the couple's return to Portugal. Consequently, for governing the country on Dom Pedro's trips through the Brazilian provinces, she is considered the first woman to become head of state in an independent American country.

== Early years ==
=== Birth and parentage ===
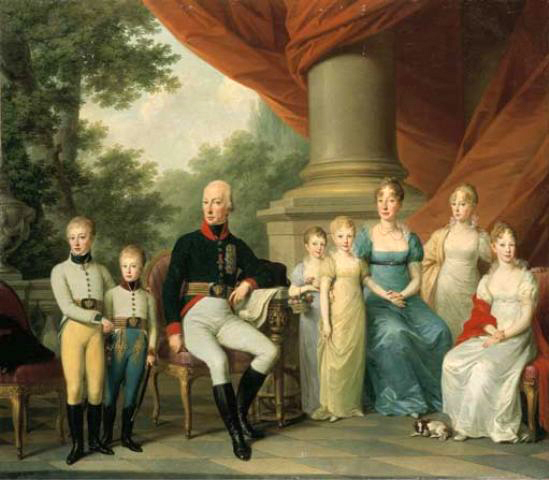
Emperor Francis I and other members of the Austrian imperial and royal family, by Joseph Kreutzinger, 1805. Maria Leopoldina is seated in the far right.

Maria Leopoldina was born on 22 January 1797 at the Hofburg Palace in Vienna, Archduchy of Austria. She was the sixth (but third surviving) child of Francis II, Holy Roman Emperor (who from 1804, became Emperor of Austria with the title of Francis I, because Napoleon Bonaparte demanded that he renounce the title of Holy Roman Emperor when he was crowned Emperor of the French) but the fifth (third surviving) child and fourth (second surviving) daughter born from his second marriage with Maria Theresa of Naples and Sicily. Her paternal grandparents were Leopold II, Holy Roman Emperor and Maria Luisa of Bourbon, Infanta of Spain and her maternal grandparents were King Ferdinand IV & III of Naples and Sicily (later King Ferdinand I of the Two Sicilies) and Archduchess Maria Carolina of Austria. Through both parents (who are double first-cousins), Maria Leopoldina was descended from the House of Habsburg-Lorraine (one of the oldest and most powerful dynasties in Europe, which reigned over Austria from 1282 to 1918, among other territories that reigned and was the oldest reigning house in Europe at the time of Maria Leopoldina's birth) and from the House of Bourbon (a royal dynasty who at the time of her birth reigned over Spain, Naples, Sicily and Parma; the main branch of the family, who reigned in France since 1589, was dethroned after the French Revolution in 1792 but briefly restored during 1814–1830). She was given the name Caroline Josepha Leopoldine Franziska Ferdinanda, according to her main biographer Carlos H. Oberacker Júnior in his work "A Imperatriz Leopoldina: Sua Vida e Sua Época", and confirmed by Bettina Kann in her work "Cartas de uma Imperatriz" and other authors. In one of the essays presented in his work, Oberacker Júnior showed an excerpt of the publication made by the Austrian newspaper Wiener Zeitung on 25 January 1797, who gave the news of the birth of the Archduchess three days before with her full name; he also mentioned that the name "Maria" was not present in the preserved baptismal record of the Archduchess, which is in fact true. According to Oberacker Júnior, the Archduchess started using it already on his trip to Brazil, when dealing with some private businesses. In Brazil, she started to sign only Leopoldina, or using the first name Maria, as can be seen in her oath to the Constitution of Brazil in 1822. According to another theory presented by Oberacker Júnior, the Archduchess probably began to use the name "Maria" due to her great devotion to the Virgin Mary and to invoke her protection, and also because all her sisters-in-law used this name.

Maria Leopoldina was born during a turbulent period in European history. In 1799, Napoleon Bonaparte became First Consul of France, and later became Emperor. He then began a series of conflicts and established systems of alliances known as "Coalitions" over Europe that frequently redefined the continent's borders. Austria was an active participant in all of the Napoleonic Wars, against France, her historical enemy. Napoleon shook the old European royal institutions, and fierce battles began through the Holy Roman Empire. Her older sister, Archduchess Maria Ludovika, married Napoleon in 1810, seeking to strengthen the ties between France and Austria. This union was undoubtedly one of the most serious defeats of the House of Habsburg; their maternal grandmother, Queen Maria Carolina of Naples and Sicily (who deeply hated everything about France after execution of her beloved sister Queen Marie Antoinette in 1793), grunted with her son-in-law's attitude: "It was precisely what I lacked, to now become the devil's grandmother".

=== Education ===
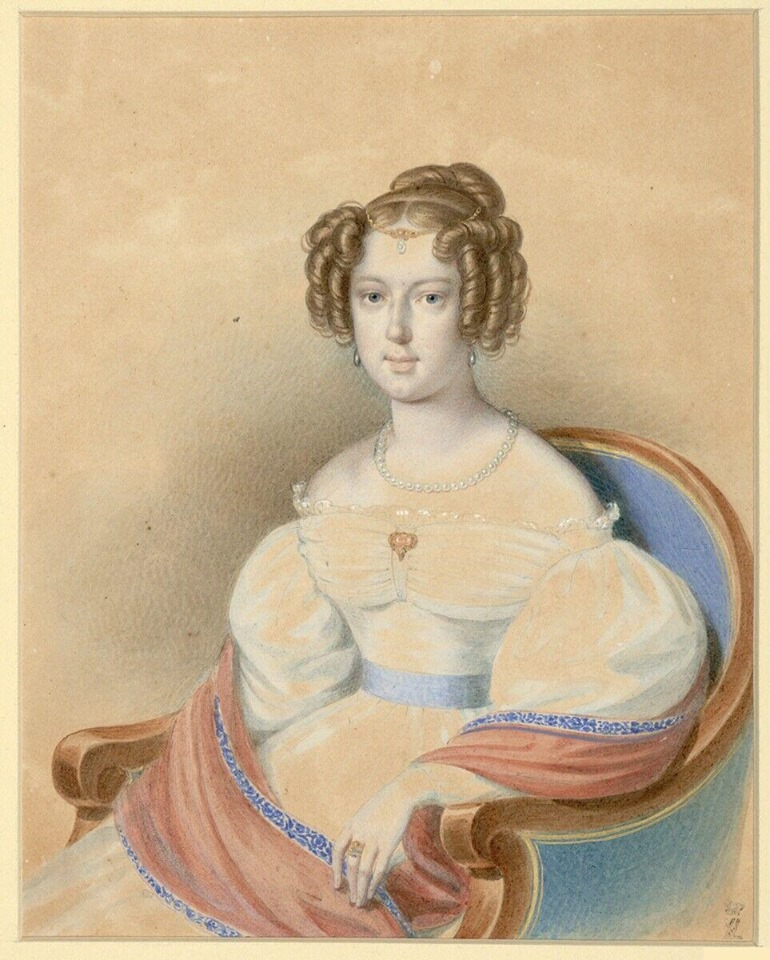
Maria Leopoldina in her youth, ca. 1810.

On 13 April 1807, the 10-year-old Archduchess lost her mother after she suffered complications due to childbirth. A year later (6 January 1808), her father remarried to Maria Ludovika of Austria-Este, the woman Maria Leopoldina would later describe as the most important person in her life.

First-cousin of her husband and granddaughter of Empress Maria Theresa, the new Empress was well-educated and surpassed her predecessor in culture and intellectual brilliance. Muse and personal friend of the poet Johann Wolfgang von Goethe, she was responsible for the intellectual formation of her stepdaughter, developing in Maria Leopoldina a taste for literature, nature and music by Joseph Haydn and Ludwig van Beethoven. Because she had no children of her own, she willingly adopted those of her predecessor; Maria Leopoldina always considered her stepmother to be her mother and she grew up with Empress Maria Ludovika as her "spiritual mother". Thanks to her, the Archduchess had the chance of meeting Goethe in 1810 and 1812, when she went to Carlsbad with her stepmother.

Maria Leopoldina was raised according to the three Habsburg principles: discipline, piety and sense of duty. Her childhood was marked by a strict education, diverse cultural stimulation and successive wars that threatened her father's domains. She and her siblings were raised in accordance with the educational principles laid down by their grandfather, Leopold II, Holy Roman Emperor, who preached equality between men, treating everyone with courtesy, the need to practise charity, and above all, the sacrifice of their own desires for the needs of the State. Among these principles was the habit of exercising their handwriting by writing the following text:

"Do not oppress the poor. Be charitable. Do not complain about what God has given you, but improve your habits. We must strive earnestly to be good".

The study program for Maria Leopoldina and her siblings included subjects such as reading, writing, dance, drawing, painting, piano, riding, hunting, history, geography and music; and in an advanced module, mathematics (arithmetic and geometry), literature, physics, singing and crafts. From an early age, Maria Leopoldina showed a greater inclination towards the disciplines of natural sciences, being mainly interested in botany and mineralogy. The Archduchess also inherited the habit of collecting from her father: she began collections of coins, plants, flowers, minerals and shells. Between October and December 1816, she was successful in quickly learning the Portuguese language; by December, the Archduchess was already speaking fluently with Portuguese diplomats, and lived "surrounded by maps of Brazil and books containing the History of this Kingdom, or Memories related to it". Language learning was part of the family formation, and Leopoldina became a notorious polyglot, speaking 7 languages: her native German, as well as Portuguese, French, Italian, English, Greek and Latin.

Leopoldina and her siblings were taken on frequent visits to museums, botanical gardens, factories and agricultural fields. And, not infrequently, they participated in dances, performed in plays and played instruments for an audience, with the intention of getting the children used to ceremonies and public exposure. The Habsburg Archudukes and Archduchesses were encouraged to attend the theatre in order to develop public speaking abilities, greater articulation and oratory skills.

== Negotiations and Marriage ==
For centuries, royal marriages in Europe served primarily as political alliances. Through marriage, the geopolitical cartography of the European continent was shaped by a complex web of shared interests and solidarity between royal houses. The marriage between Maria Leopoldina and Dom Pedro de Alcântara, Prince Royal of the United Kingdom of Portugal, Brazil and the Algarves, was a strategic alliance between the monarchies of Portugal and Austria. With this union, the House of Habsburg-Lorraine fulfilled the famous motto: Bella gerant alii, tu, felix Austria, nube ("Let others wage war, thou, happy Austria, marry").

On 24 September 1816, it was announced by Emperor Francis I that Dom Pedro de Alcântara, wished to take a Habsburg Archduchess as his wife. Prince Klemens von Metternich suggested that it should be Maria Leopoldina to go get married, as it was "her turn" to become a wife. The Marquis of Marialva played an enormous role in the wedding negotiations, the same one who had negotiated, advised by Alexander von Humboldt, the coming to Brazil of the French Artistic Mission. King John VI did everything to include the Infanta Dona Isabel Maria (who would be regent of the Kingdom of Portugal from 1826 to 1828 and would die unmarried) in the negotiations. The Marquis of Marialva made a guarantee that the Portuguese royal family was determined to return to the continent as soon as Brazil demonstrated that it had surely "escaped the flames of the wars of independence that were advancing in the Spanish colonies", thus obtaining Austrian consent to marriage. Once this was secured, the contract was signed in Vienna on 29 November 1816.

Two ships were prepared, and in April 1817, scientists, painters, gardeners and a taxidermist, all with assistants, travelled to Rio de Janeiro ahead of Maria Leopoldina, who, in the meantime, studied the history and geography of her future home and learned Portuguese. During these weeks, the Archduchess compiled and wrote a vade mecum, a unique document the like of which has never been produced by any other Habsburg princess.

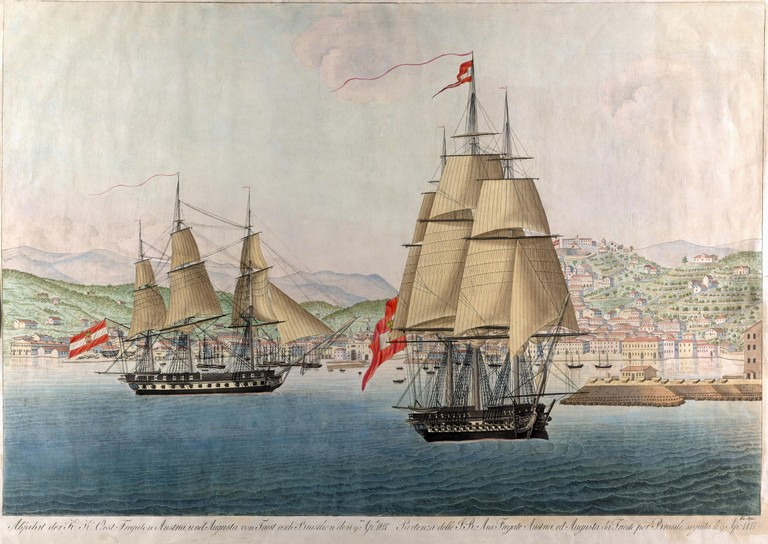
A coloured engraving representing Austria and Augusta, the two ships that took Maria Leopoldina to Brazil, departing from Trieste, by Giovanni Passi.

The marriage per procuram (by proxy) between Maria Leopoldina and Dom Pedro took place on 13 May 1817 at the Augustinian Church in Vienna. The groom was represented by the bride's uncle, Archduke Charles, Duke of Teschen.

"The culmination of the wedding ceremonies was reached in Vienna's Augarten where, on 1 June, Marialva, who had had few opportunities to reveal his nation's splendor, wealth and hospitality, gave a sumptuous reception for which she had made preparations during all winter. Shortly before the wedding, two Austrian frigates, Austria and Augusta, left for Rio de Janeiro, with furniture and decorations for the newly installed Austrian embassy there, the equipment for a scientific expedition to the interior of Brazil and numerous exhibitions of Austrian commercial products".

Through this marriage, King John VI saw the opportunity to counteract the excessive influence of England in its domains by forging new alliances with traditional dynasties. Austria, on the other hand, saw the new Portuguese-Brazilian Empire as an important transatlantic ally that fit perfectly with the reactionary, absolutist ideals of the Holy Alliance. In this way, the marriage was a purely political act, not a sentimental one.

== From Austria to the New World and the Scientific Mission ==
=== The crossing of the Atlantic ===
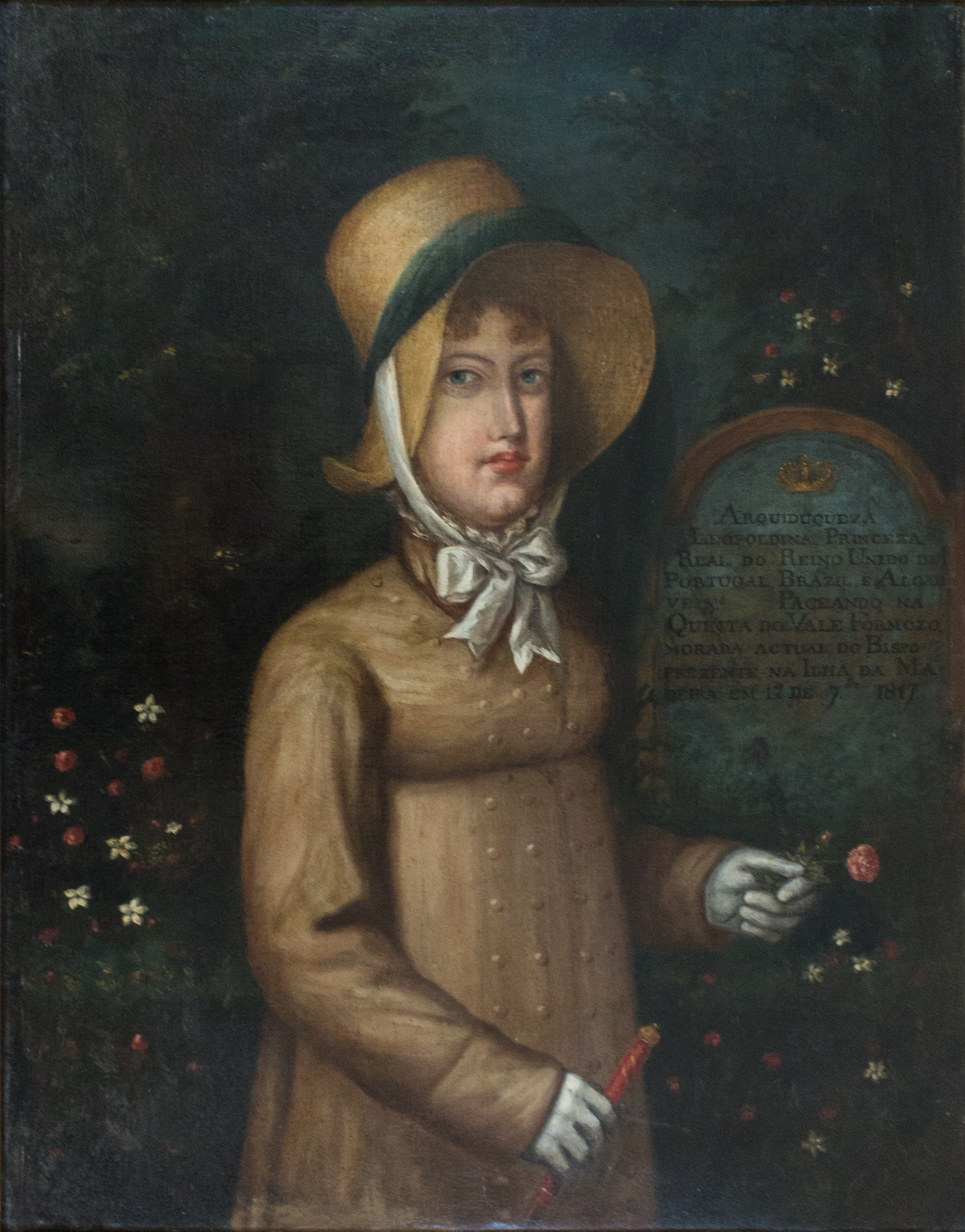
Maria Leopoldina in Madeira Island.

Maria Leopoldina's trip to Brazil was difficult and time-consuming. The Archduchess left Vienna for Florence on 2 June 1817, where she awaited further instructions from the Portuguese court, since monarchical authority remained tenuous in Brazil since the Pernambucan revolt.

On 13 August 1817, Maria Leopoldina was finally allowed to embark on her journey from Livorno, Italy, on the Portuguese fleet composed of the ships D. João VI and São Sebastião. With her luggage and a large entourage, she faced 86 days of crossing the waters of the Atlantic. Forty boxes the height of a man contained her trousseau, books, collections and gifts for the future family. She brought also an impressive household: court ladies, a chambermaid, a butler, six ladies-in-waiting, four pages, six Hungarian nobles, six Austrian guards, six chamberlains, a chief Almoner, a chaplain, a private secretary, a doctor, a performer, a mineralogist and her painting teacher. The Archduchess definitively parted for Brazil two days later, on 15 August. The differences in habits and customs, already noticed in the period since she embarked, foreshadowed the difficulties that she would face in Rio de Janeiro. The first time she set foot on Portuguese territory, however, it was not on Brazilian land, but on Madeira Island, on 11 September.

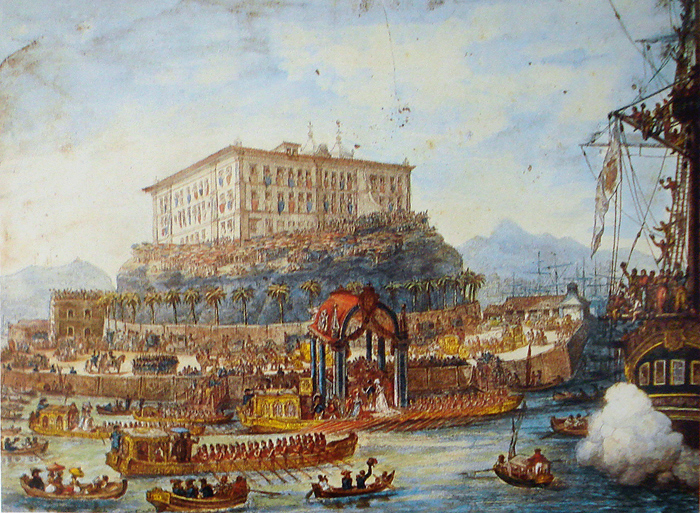
Landing of Archduchess Maria Leopoldina in Rio de Janeiro on 5 November 1817, by Jean-Baptiste Debret.

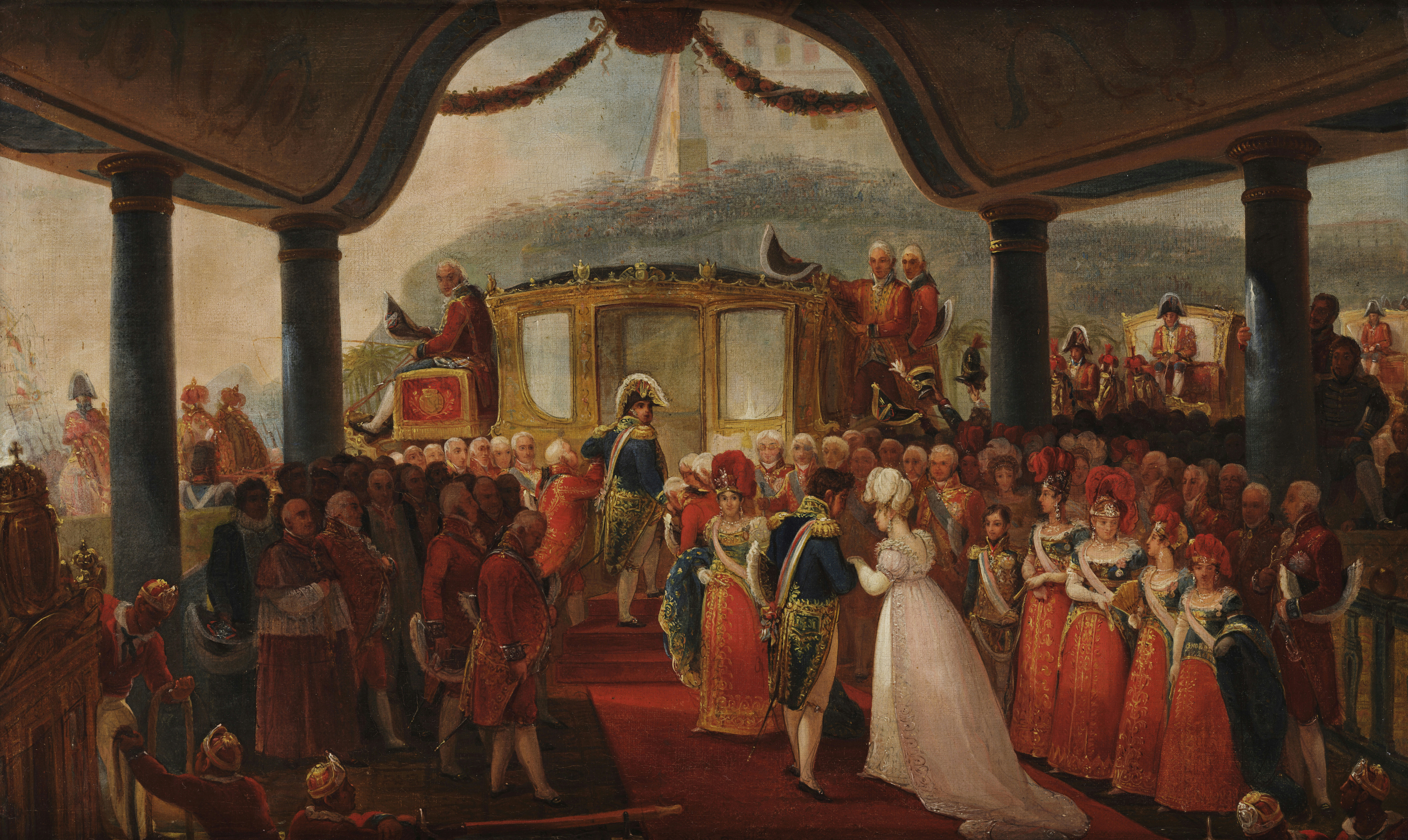
Reception of Archduchess Maria Leopoldina by Dom Pedro, the royal family and court on 5 November 1817, by Jean-Baptiste Debret.

On 5 November 1817, Maria Leopoldina arrived to Rio de Janeiro, where she finally met her husband and his family. The next day, the official marriage ceremony took place at the Capela Real of Rio de Janeiro Cathedral amidst celebrations all over the city.

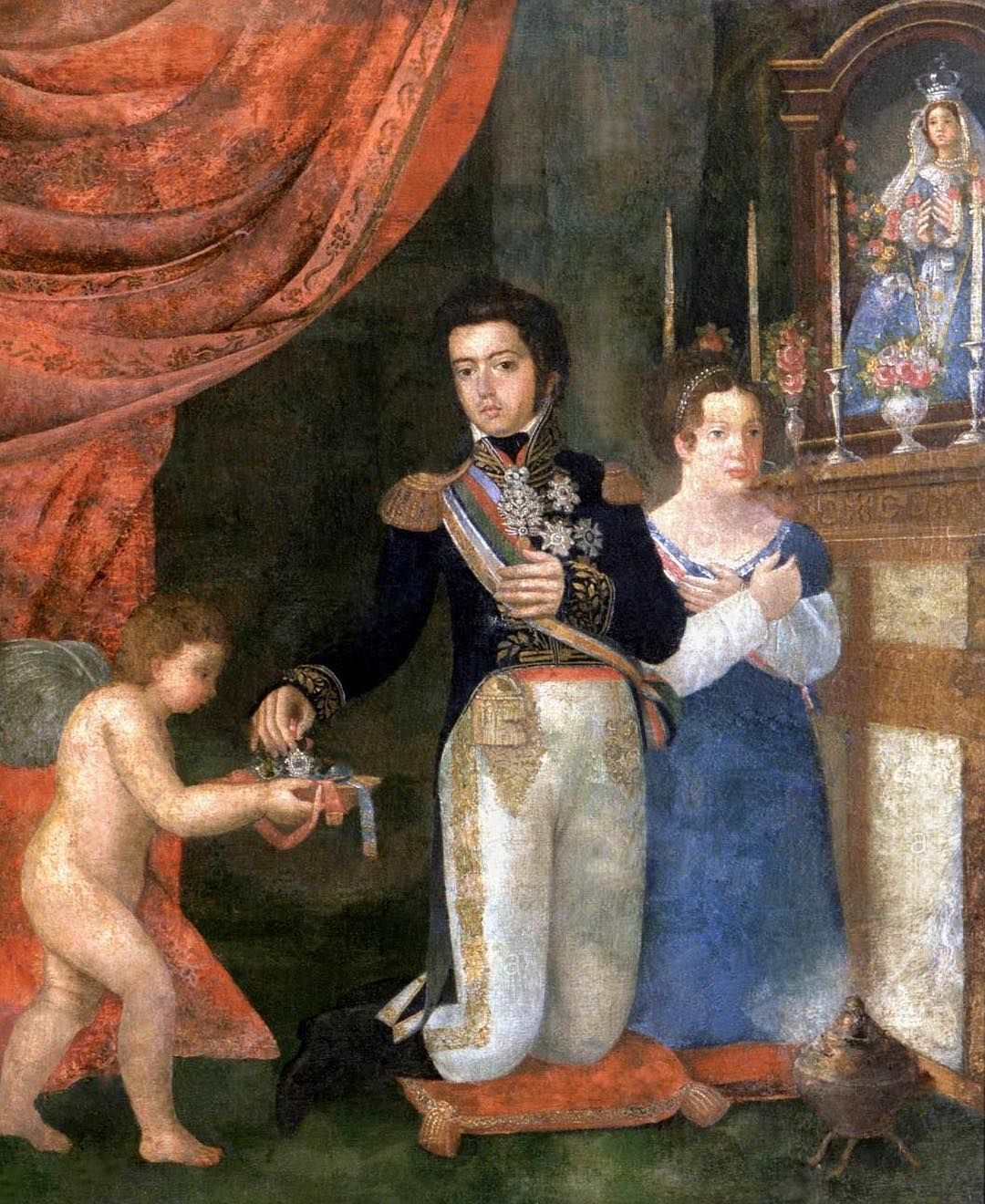
Allegory of the wedding of Pedro and Maria Leopoldina, the Prince and Princess Royal of the United Kingdom of Portugal, Brazil and the Algarves, 1820

Upon her arrival, the physical appearance of Maria Leopoldina surprised the Portuguese royal family, who were awaiting a beautiful Archduchess. Instead, she was overweight, though with a beautiful face. However, she was also extraordinarily cultured for her time, with a keen interest in botany. The arrival provided Jean-Baptiste Debret with an occasion for his first commission, where he had 12 days to decorate the city. He had a studio in the Catumbi neighborhood, where as a naturalist, he later made drawings of plants and flowers for Maria Leopoldina. He would say: "I was in charge of graciously executing some drawings for her that she dared to ask for", he said, "in the name of his sister, former Empress of the French ". In his atelier, Debret designed the great gala uniforms of the court, in green and gold, the decorations of the new state, and previously designed the crown created by Napoleon in 1806 for the Kingdom of Italy. Debret also designed the insignia of the Order of the Southern Cross, comparable to the Medal of the Legion of Honor, and years later he also designed the Imperial Order of the Rose, instituted in honor of Dom Pedro's second wife, Amélie of Leuchtenberg.

From a distance, the Portuguese Royal Prince initially appeared to his new wife as a perfect, well-educated gentleman, but the reality was very different. Dom Pedro was a year younger than Maria Leopoldina and rarely measured up to the descriptions she had been given by the matchmakers. His temperament was impulsive and choleric, and his education modest. Even spoken communication between the young married couple proved difficult, as Pedro spoke very little French and his Portuguese could only be described as vulgar. In addition, keeping with Portuguese tradition, the 18-year-old Dom Pedro not only had a string of amorous adventures behind him and was principally interested in horse racing and love affairs, but by the time of his marriage he was living as if in wedlock with French dancer Noemie Thierry, who was finally removed from the court by his father a month after Maria Leopoldina's arrival in Rio de Janeiro.

The young married couple took up residence in six relatively small rooms in the Palace of São Cristóvão. The inner courtyard and path to the stables were unpaved and the tropical rainfall quickly turned everything to mud. There were insects everywhere, including in their clothing, for the uniforms and court regalia made of velvet and plush rotted and turned mouldy in the heat and humidity. The Prince von Metternich would intercept a letter from the Baron von Eschwege to his partner in Vienna in which he said: "Speaking of the Crown Prince, since he is not without natural intelligence, he is lacking in formal education. He was raised among horses, and the princess sooner or later you will realize that he is not able to coexist in harmony. Furthermore, the court of Rio is very boring and insignificant, compared to the courts of Europe".

In the wake of Maria Leopoldina's arrival, the first wave of immigrants arrived in Brazil; Swiss settlers who settled in the vicinity of the court, founding Nova Friburgo and settling in the future Petrópolis, the later Imperial summer residence. From 1824, due to the Brazilian campaign in Europe organized by Major Georg Anton Schäffer, the Germans arrived more numerous and settled again in Nova Friburgo and in the temperate regions of the provinces of Santa Catarina and Rio Grande do Sul, where the colony of São Leopoldo was created in the new Royal Princess's honour. Some from Pomerania went to Espírito Santo, living until the 1880s in such complete isolation that they did not even speak Portuguese.

=== Austrian Scientific Mission ===
Brazil was portrayed and studied by European artists and scientists of the first order long before other American countries. In the 17th century, amid the context of the Dutch occupation of northeastern Brazil, Prince John Maurice of Nassau-Siegen brought to Brazil a significant group of collaborators, among which we can mention Willem Piso, a doctor who came to study tropical diseases; Frans Post, famous painter, then in his early twenties; Albert Eckhout, also a painter; cartographer Cornelius Golijath; the astronomer Georg Marggraf, who, with Piso, would be the author of Historia Naturalis Brasiliae (Amsterdam, 1648), the first scientific work on Brazilian nature. The Prince of Nassau-Siegen was also concerned with perpetuating the political events of his administration, entrusting Caspar Barlaeus with a history of his government in Brazil.

Once the Dutch were expelled, the Portuguese became aware that the recovery of the territory was the result of a series of happy circumstances, which could no longer be repeated, in the event of a new invasion of the territory of Portuguese America. In view of this situation, Portugal has taken the policy of the State to prohibit the access of its overseas possessions to any and all foreigners, even prohibiting the publication of any news or reference to American lands. This State policy was effectively followed by several generations, from the middle of the 17th century until the arrival of the royal family to Brazil and the consequent opening of Brazil to the world, symbolized by the Decree of Opening Ports to Friendly Nations (Decreto de Abertura dos Portos às Nações Amigas), first act signed by Prince Regent John, during his stay in Salvador, in 1808.

The opening of the ports and the consequent revocation of the ban on the landing of foreigners in Brazilian lands, which coincided with a difficult time for European naturalists, as their transit through Europe was significantly hampered by the Napoleonic Wars, coupled with the lack of knowledge about this immense portion of the globe's territory, aroused enormous scientific interest in Europe. Parallel to this world context, Maria Leopoldina, since her first youth (around 14 years old), started to show a special interest in the natural sciences, especially in geology and botany. This fact did not go unnoticed by her teachers and by her father, Emperor Francis I of Austria, who surprised the young Archduchess's interests (they thought it would be more natural for such inclinations to arise in one of her brothers), but did nothing to hinder the young Maria Leopoldina's studies.

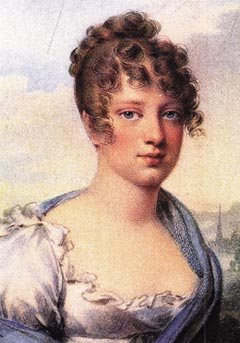
Maria Leopoldina, by Jean-Baptiste Isabey, ca. 1817.

Therefore, in 1817, when the forthcoming announcement of the wedding of Maria Leopoldina and Dom Pedro, immediately was organized, under the auspices of the Austrian court (but also integrated by Bavarian scientists), what would become the main scientific expedition into the unknown (for science) Brazilian lands.

In 1815 King Maximilian I Joseph of Bavaria was already planning a great scientific expedition through South America, but some setbacks occurred and the expedition was not carried out. So when in 1817 Maria Leopoldina embarked to Brazil for her wedding with Dom Pedro, the Bavarian sovereign took the opportunity and sent two of his subjects: Carl Friedrich Philipp von Martius, doctor and botanist, and Johann Baptist von Spix, zoologist, with the retinue of the Archduchess.

In addition to these, Karl von Schreibers, Director of the Natural History Museum, under orders from Chancellor Prince von Metternich, prepared a mission with notable scientists who would accompany the Archduchess's entourage. Among the scientists were: Johann Christof Mikan, a botanist and entomologist; Johann Emanuel Pohl, physician, mineralogist and botanist; Johann Buchberger, flora painter; Johann Natterer, zoologist; Thomas Ender, painter; Heinrich Schott, gardener; and the Italian naturalist Giuseppe Raddi, this group aimed to collect specimens and make illustrations of people and landscapes for a museum to be founded in Vienna.

The greatest interest was to trace the New World by researching plants, animals and Indians. All this fascination was due to the publication of the first volume of the book by the German geographer Alexander von Humboldt, Le voyage aux régions equinoxiales du Nouveau Continent, fait en 1799–1804 ("The voyage to the equinoctial regions of the New Continent, made in 1799–1804") and Aimé Bonpland. Humboldt influenced several artists, for example Johann Moritz Rugendas, and the striking feature of his research, as well as that of Humboldtian artists, was to represent everything he saw in an encyclopedic way, that is, explaining in detail everything they saw.

Maria Leopoldina's well-known interest in sciences was noted in 1818 when she influenced her father-in-law to create the Royal Museum (the now National Museum of Brazil). Just a few months after her arrival in Brazil, was also created the first Brazilian Natural History Museum, which promoted scientists to explore Brazil. In September 1824, the British well-travelled and published writer Maria Graham arrived to Boa Vista and was given a friendly reception by Dom Pedro and Maria Leopoldina and granted full authority over the upbringing of their eldest daughter Maria da Glória, whose education at that time was widely neglected; soon Maria Leopoldina and her daughter's governess relationship quickly grew into an affectionate friendship, moreover because both shared a common interest in the sciences. Although after only six weeks Maria Graham was dismissed from her post by Dom Pedro, to Maria Leopoldina's dismay, both women's common interest allowed them to stay close to each other up until Maria Leopoldina's death: they wanted to get information that they were not privileged to because they were living in a male dominated world.

== Regent and Empress of Brazil ==
=== Background of the Independence ===
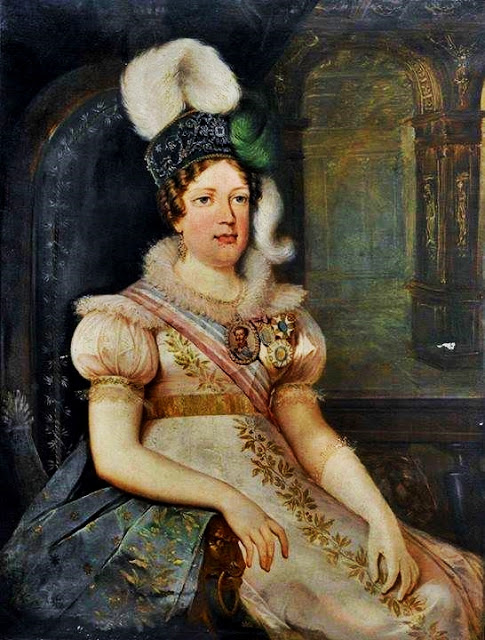
Maria Leopoldina wearing court dress and the insignia of the Imperial Order of the Cross, c. 1820s

The year 1821 was decisive in Maria Leopoldina's life. Belonging to one of the most conservative and enduring families in Europe (the House of Habsburg-Lorraine) she came from a careful education based on the molds of the absolutist monarchies of the time. In June 1821, a frightened Maria Leopoldina wrote to her father "My husband, God help us, loves the new ideas", suspicious of the new constitutional and liberal political values; she personally witnessed the events that took place in Europe years before, in which Napoleon Bonaparte systematically altered the political power of the continent, having a certain influence on his way of seeing these new political concepts. The conservative and traditional education of which the Archduchess had been disciplined also adds to this aspect.

Maria Leopoldina, previously lacking in affection and approval, quickly gives way to the adult woman who faces life without illusions. As the friction between Portugal and Brazil unfolded, she became increasingly involved in the turmoil of political events that preceded the Independence of Brazil. Her involvement with Brazilian politics would lead her to play a fundamental role in the later Independence, alongside José Bonifácio de Andrada. In this phase, she distances herself from the conservative (absolutist) ideas of the Vienna court and adopts a more liberal (constitutional) discourse in favor of the Brazilian cause.

As a result of the Liberal Revolution that took place in Portugal in 1820, on 25 April 1821 the court was forced to return to Portugal. A squadron of eleven ships took King John VI, the court, the royal house and the royal treasury back to the continent, and only Dom Pedro remained in Brazil as regent of the country, with ample powers counterbalanced by a regency council. At first, the new Regent was incapable of dominating the chaos: the situation was dominated by the Portuguese troops, in anarchic conditions. The opposition between Portuguese and Brazilians became increasingly evident. It can be clearly seen in Maria Leopoldina's correspondence that she warmly espoused the cause of the Brazilian people and came to desire the country's Independence.

=== The conspirator of São Cristóvão ===
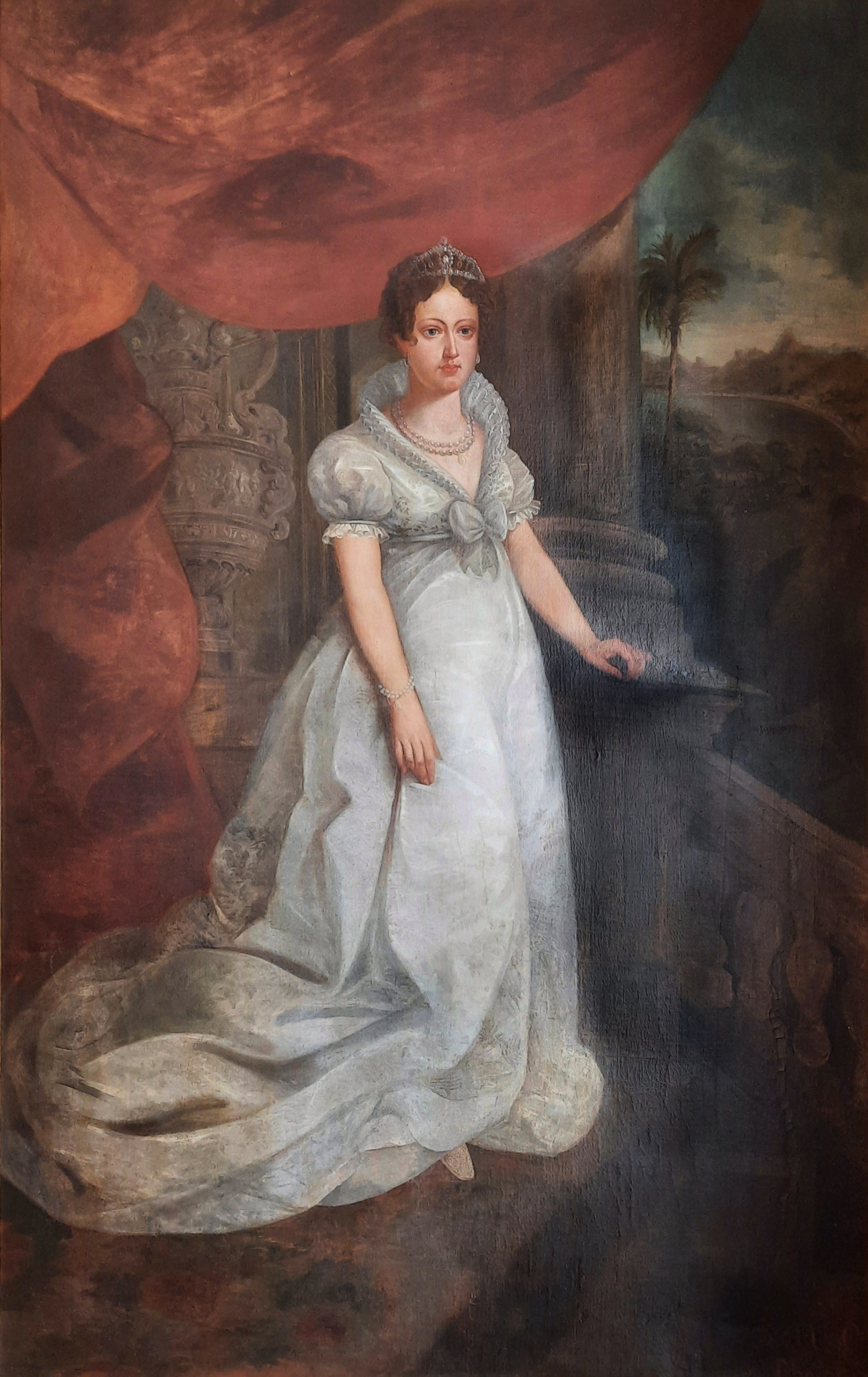
Portrait of Maria Leopoldina, by Luís Schlappriz (undated)

Maria Leopoldina grew up fearing popular revolutions due to the example of her great-aunt Marie Antoinette, the last Queen of France, guillotined during the French Revolution. However, the fear of revolutions that would diminish the powers of the monarchs by popular revolt as happened in France in 1789 and recently in Portugal in 1820 was not seen in Brazil: "As soon as the autonomist movement and then the independence movement won Dom Pedro and Dona Leopoldina as protagonists, the Brazilians saw them as allies for the first time, and not as tyrants who should be defeated to give up power".

Prepared to maintain fidelity to the absolutist monarchy, Maria Leopoldina did not imagine that she would be Regent in the troubled moments that preceded the break with Portugal, nor that she would defend the Independence of Brazil even before Dom Pedro, in a clear attitude contrary to the education she received. The Austrian Archduchess was always on the side of the Brazilian cause and, in several letters written to her friends in Europe, began to distinguish between Portuguese and Brazilians, making it clear what she thought about Portuguese domination over the colony. With the return of the court to Portugal and the appointment of Dom Pedro as Prince Regent of Brazil (25 April 1821), Maria Leopoldina conceived that staying in America was the solution for the defense of dynastic legitimacy against the liberal excesses that threatened the power of the Houses of Habsburg and Bragança in Brazil. Dom Pedro, by the other hand, without any political experience and overwhelmed by the current unstable situation, constantly asked his father to release him from the regency and allow him and his family to return to Portugal—in September 1821, six months after King John VI's departure, he wrote: "I beg Your Majesty most urgently to release me from this onerous task".

Maria Leopoldina's determination to stay became even more staunch thanks to the support of José Bonifácio de Andrada, an educated man from São Paulo; with his help, she decisively convinced her husband that maintaining the territorial integrity of Brazil was only possible if they both remained there. Finally, on 9 January 1822 Dom Pedro solemnly declared: "Fico!" (I am staying). At the age of 24, Maria Leopoldina made a political decision that sentenced her to indefinite stay in America and would deprive her for the rest of her life from living near her father, siblings and other family members. Just as her sister Marie Louise married Napoleon Bonaparte with the intention of bringing political relations between the Austrian and the French Empires closer through this wedding, for Maria Leopoldina a role was kept in history much more relevant than that of her sister.

Two days later, the decision of the Prince-Regent to remain in Brazil caused outraged among the Cortes (the elected parliamentary representatives of the Portuguese people, who wanted that the whole royal family leave Brazil, after which the country would have been divided up into separate regions): government offices and buildings were burned—a revolution broke out. Dom Pedro and Maria Leopoldina were at the theatre at that moment; while he rode out with his troops against the Cortes, Maria Leopoldina went onto the stage and announced: "Remain calm, my husband has everything under control!". With this announcement (who was greeted with jubilation) she placed herself firmly on the side of the Brazilian people.

However, Maria Leopoldina's knew that her life was in danger; she hurriedly back to Boa Vista. Seven months pregnant at that moment, she took both her children, three-year-old Maria da Glória and eleven-month-old João Carlos, into a coach and fled with them to Santa Cruz, in a perilous twelve-hour journey. The political situation soon calmed down and she was able to return with her children to Boa Vista. However, the young Prince João Carlos never recovered from the strain and died on 4 February 1822.

At the end of 1821, a letter of Maria Leopoldina addressed to her secretary Schäffer makes it clear that she was, since that time, more decided by Brazil and by the Brazilians than Dom Pedro: it was necessary to stay in Brazil and go against the demands of the Portuguese court. Her Dia do Fico was earlier than that of her husband.

In the Manifesto to the Friendly Nations, signed by Dom Pedro on 6 August 1822, the despotism of the courts of Lisbon was denounced in relation to Brazilian affairs and called upon the friendly nations of Brazil to deal directly with matters with Rio de Janeiro and no longer with the Portuguese government, explaining its cause and events from the point of view of Brazilians. In the same document, however, it is possible to observe that, even on the eve of the Proclamation of Independence, the prince regent did not wish to dissolve the ties between Portugal and Brazil, but did not promise to defend the links between the two countries. That would be an ineffective measure of neutrality, since a month later the country would become independent. As a woman was not well regarded in the political environment, Maria Leopoldina acted by means of "specific advice and influencing others to her husband, [so] she was achieving her conquests". Dom Pedro, at first, avoided contact with the Brazilian idea of freedom, trying to maintain neutrality, aiming to avoid the probable punishment of losing his inheritance to the Portuguese throne if he disobeyed the courts. Maria Leopoldina realized that Portugal, dominated by the courts, was already lost and that Brazil still lay like a blank canvas, which could become a future power, much more relevant than the old metropolis: the court orders, if enforced, would eventually shatter Brazil into dozens of republics, as had happened with the Spanish colonies in South America. According to Ezekiel Ramirez, the signs of a nascent Brazilian unit as an independent nation in the southern provinces were visible, but the north supported the Lisbon Cortes and called for regional independence. If the Prince Regent had left the country at that moment, Brazil would be lost to Portugal because the courts of Lisbon repeated the same error that led the Spanish courts to lose the colonies, seeking to establish direct contacts with each province in particular.

Maria Leopoldina's attitude, defending Brazilian interests, is eloquently stamped in the letter he wrote to Dom Pedro, on the occasion of Brazil's independence:

"You need to come back as soon as possible. Be persuaded that it is not only love that makes me want your immediate presence more than ever, but the circumstances in which the beloved Brazil is. Only your presence, a lot of energy and rigor can save you from ruin".

In Rio de Janeiro, thousands of signatures collected required the regents to remain in Brazil. "José Bonifácio de Andrada's courageous attitude toward Portuguese arrogance greatly encouraged the aspirations for unity that existed in the southern provinces, especially in São Paulo. A highly educated men led this movement." After the Dia do Fico a new ministry was organized under the leadership of José Bonifácio, "a strictly monarchist", and the Prince-Regent soon won the trust of the people. On 15 February 1822 the Portuguese troops left Rio de Janeiro, and their departure represented the dissolution of the ties between Brazil and the metropolis. Dom Pedro was triumphantly received in Minas Gerais.

=== Regency ===
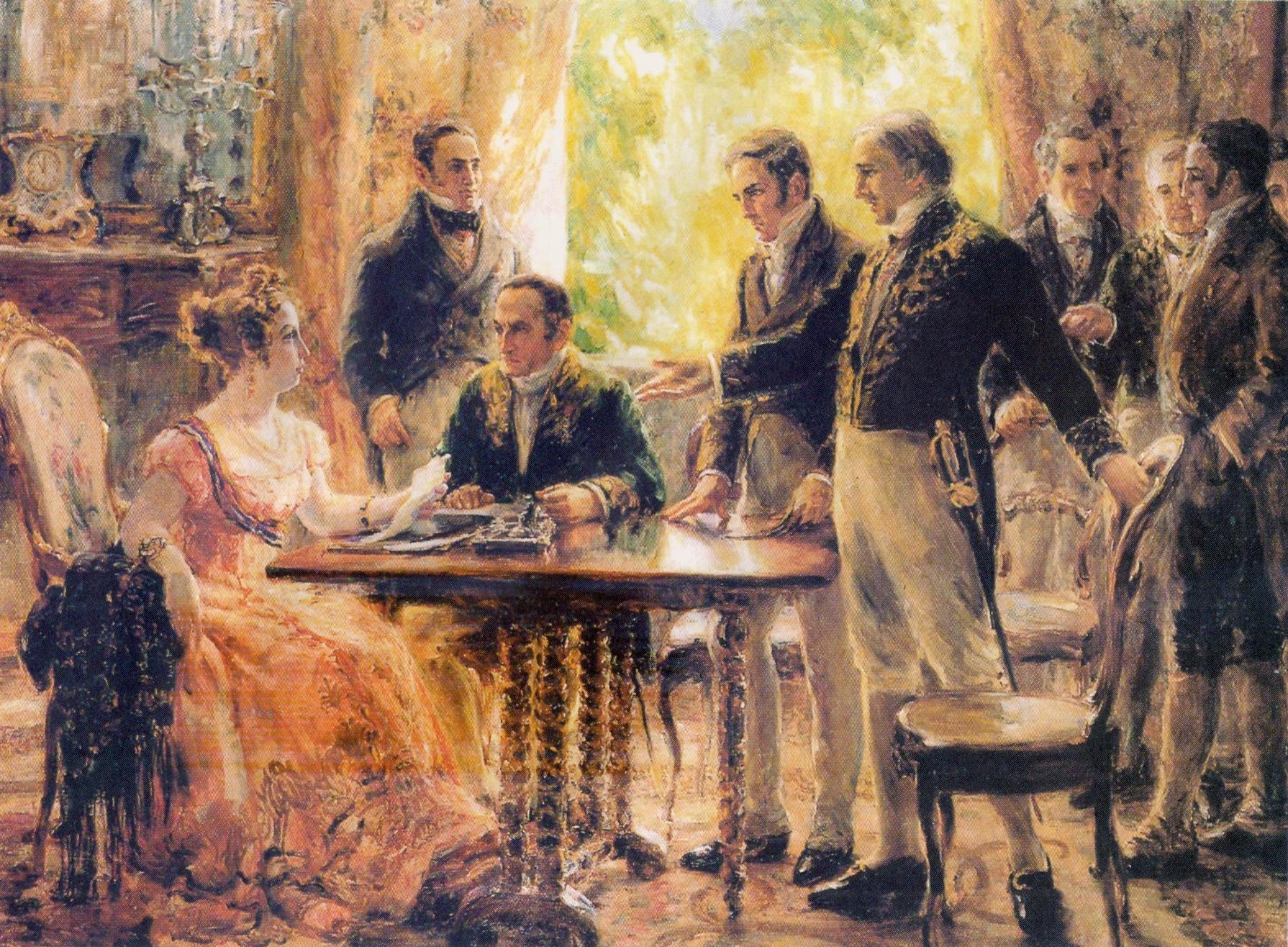
Sessão do Conselho de Estado by Georgina de Albuquerque. Maria Leopoldina presides over the Council of Ministers as regent on 2 September 1822. The meeting resulted in the letter urging Prince Pedro to declare Brazil's independence. José Bonifácio stands opposite the Princess Royal, gesturing while addressing her.

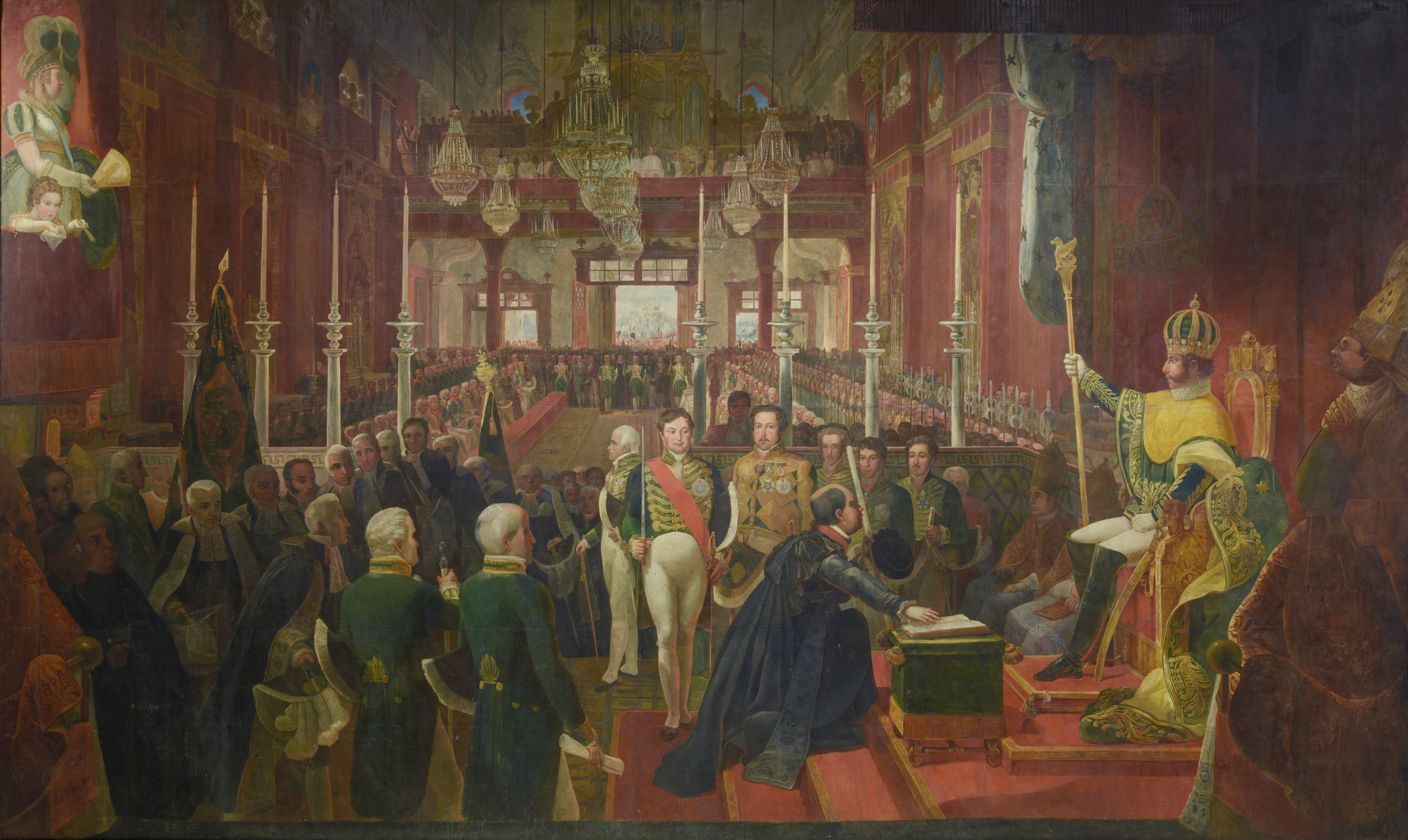
Maria Leopoldina and her eldest child, Maria da Glória, Princess Imperial (later Queen Maria II of Portugal), pictured in the upper-left box during the coronation of Pedro I at the Imperial Chapel, 1 December 1822

When her husband traveled to São Paulo in August 1822 to pacify politics (which culminated in the proclamation of Brazil's Independence in September), Maria Leopoldina was appointed as his official representative, that is, as Regent in his absence. Her status was confirmed with a document of investiture dated 13 August 1822 in which Dom Pedro appointing her head of the Council of State and Acting Princess Regent of the Kingdom of Brazil, giving her complete authority to take any necessary political decisions during his absence. Great was her influence in the process of independence. The Brazilians were already aware that Portugal intended to call Dom Pedro back, relegating Brazil again to the status of a simple colony rather than a kingdom united to that of Portugal. There were fears that a civil war would separate the Province of São Paulo from the rest of Brazil.

The Princess Regent received a new decree with demands from Lisbon arrived in Rio de Janeiro and, without time to wait for Dom Pedro's return, Maria Leopoldina, advised by José Bonifácio de Andrada, and using her attributes as interim head of government, met in the morning of 2 September 1822 with the Council of State and signed the Decree of Independence, declaring Brazil separate from Portugal. Maria Leopoldina send Dom Pedro a letter, along with another letter from José Bonifácio, as well as comments from Portugal criticizing the actions of her husband and King John VI. In her letter to her husband, the Princess Regent suggests her husband to proclaim the Independence of Brazil, with the warning: "The fruit is ripe, pick it up, otherwise it will rot" (O pomo está maduro, colha-o já, senão apodrece).

Dom Pedro declared the Independence of Brazil upon receiving the letter of his wife on 7 September 1822 at São Paulo. Maria Leopoldina had also sent papers received from Lisbon, and comments from Antônio Carlos Ribeiro de Andrada, deputy to the courts, for which the Prince Regent learned of criticism of him in the metropolis. The position of John VI and all his ministry, dominated by the courts, was difficult.

While awaiting the return of her husband, Maria Leopoldina, the interim ruler of an already independent country, idealized the flag of Brazil, in which she mixed the green of the House of Braganza and the golden yellow of the House of Habsburg. Other authors say that Jean-Baptiste Debret, the French artist who designed what he saw in Brazil in the 1820s, was the author of the national pavilion that replaced that of the old Portuguese court, symbol of the oppression of the old regime. Debret is the design of the beautiful imperial flag, in collaboration with José Bonifácio de Andrada, in which the green rectangle of the Braganza represented the forests and the yellow rhombus, color of the Habsburg-Lorraine dynasty, represented the gold. After that, Maria Leopoldina committed herself deeply in the recognition of the autonomy of the new country by the European courts, writing letters to the father, the Emperor of Austria, and to her father-in-law, the King of Portugal.

Maria Leopoldina became Brazil's first Empress consort, being acclaimed as such on 1 December 1822, at the coronation ceremony and consecration of her husband as Dom Pedro I, Constitutional Emperor and Perpetual Defender of Brazil. Due to Brazil's status as at the time the only monarchy in South America, Maria Leopoldina was the first Empress of the New World.

=== Bahia's participation in the independence process ===
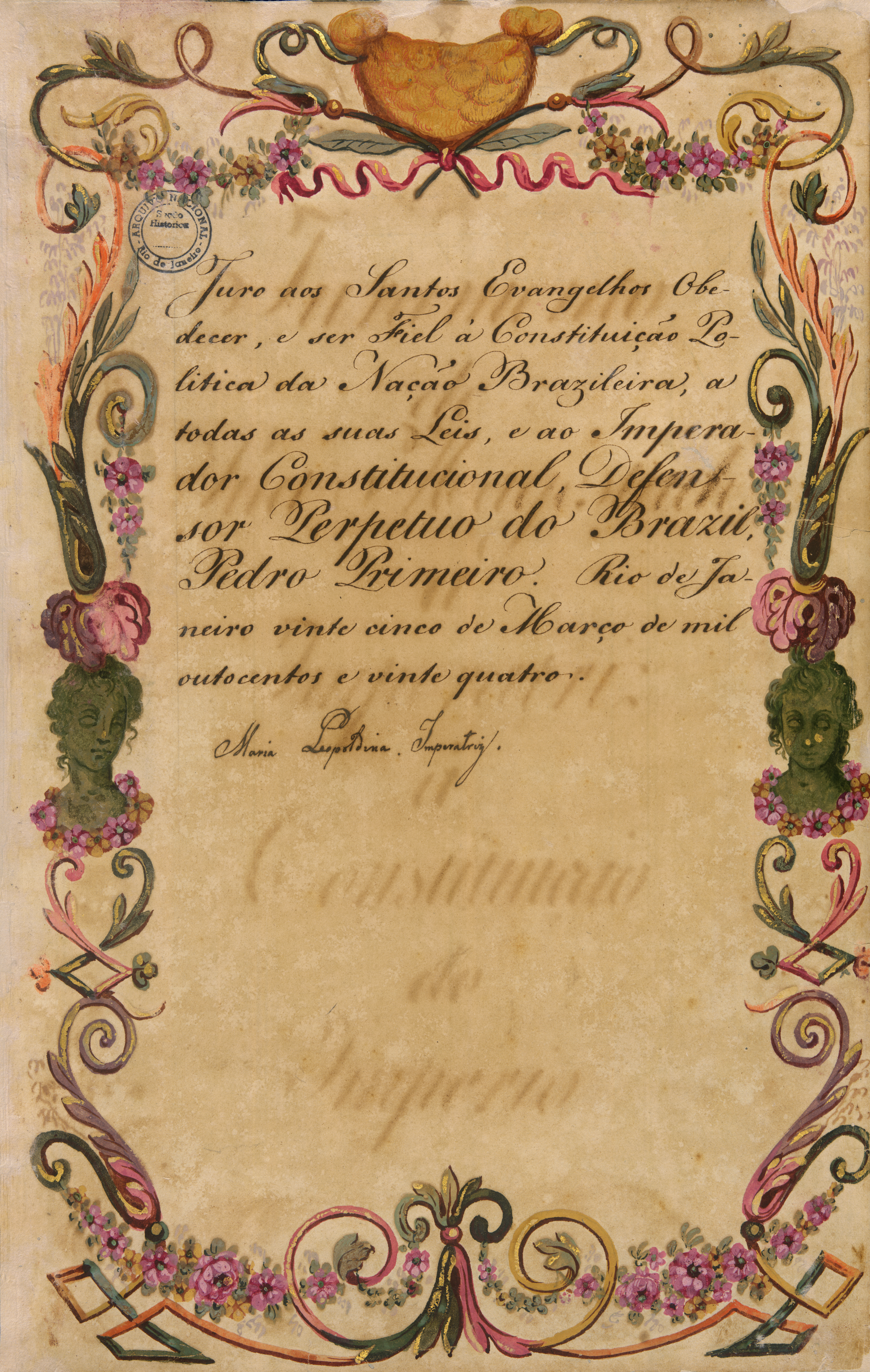
Oath of the Empress Maria Leopoldina to the Constitution of Brazil, 1824

First headquarters of the government, radiating center for metropolitan policies and strategic port, Bahia only lost its privileged situation in Brazil with the discovery of gold in the Hereditary Captaincy of Espírito Santo, and the region where the deposits were discovered by Bandeirantes was dismembered from the said captaincy and transformed in the province of Minas Gerais (dismemberment that was repeated as new deposits were discovered, causing the Captaincy of Espírito Santo to narrow Minas Gerais, in an ill-fated containment barrier against gold smuggling) and the subsequent transfer of the capital to Rio de Janeiro, in 1776. Salvador did not want to welcome the passing court, as it did in 1808, but permanently. In the process of separating from Portugal, Bahia hosted antagonistic currents: the pro-independence interior and the capital loyal to the court of Lisbon. After 7 September 1822, there was an armed struggle that gave victory to the imperial troops on 2 July 1823.

Bahian women actively participated in the patriotic battle. Maria Quitéria, enlisted clandestinely as a loyal soldier to the Brazilian cause, was described by Maria Graham and decorated by the Order of the Southern Cross by Emperor Pedro I. The oral tradition of Itaparica Island also records the role of Afro-Brazilian Maria Felipa de Oliveira, who would have led more than 40 black women and defending the Island. Already Sister Joana Angélica, Abbess of the Convent of Lapa, prevented with her own life the entry of Portuguese troops in the cloister.

Women's political awareness is also highlighted in the "Carta das senhoras baianas à sua alteza real dona Leopoldina", who congratulates the Princess-Regent for her part in the patriotic resolutions on behalf of her husband and the country. In the letter of 186 Bahian ladies, delivered by hand in August 1822, was express their gratitude for Maria Leopoldina's stay in Brazil. The Princess-Regent writes to her husband to express her views on the presence of women in politics, telling him that the attitude of those ladies "proves that women are more cheerful and are more adherent to the good cause". Despite not returning to host the government, Bahia played an important role in the regional political balance in favor of the Brazilian Empire. In recognition of the support obtained in the Independence process, the Emperor and Empress visited Salvador between February and March 1826.

== Decline in health and death ==
=== Popular commotion ===
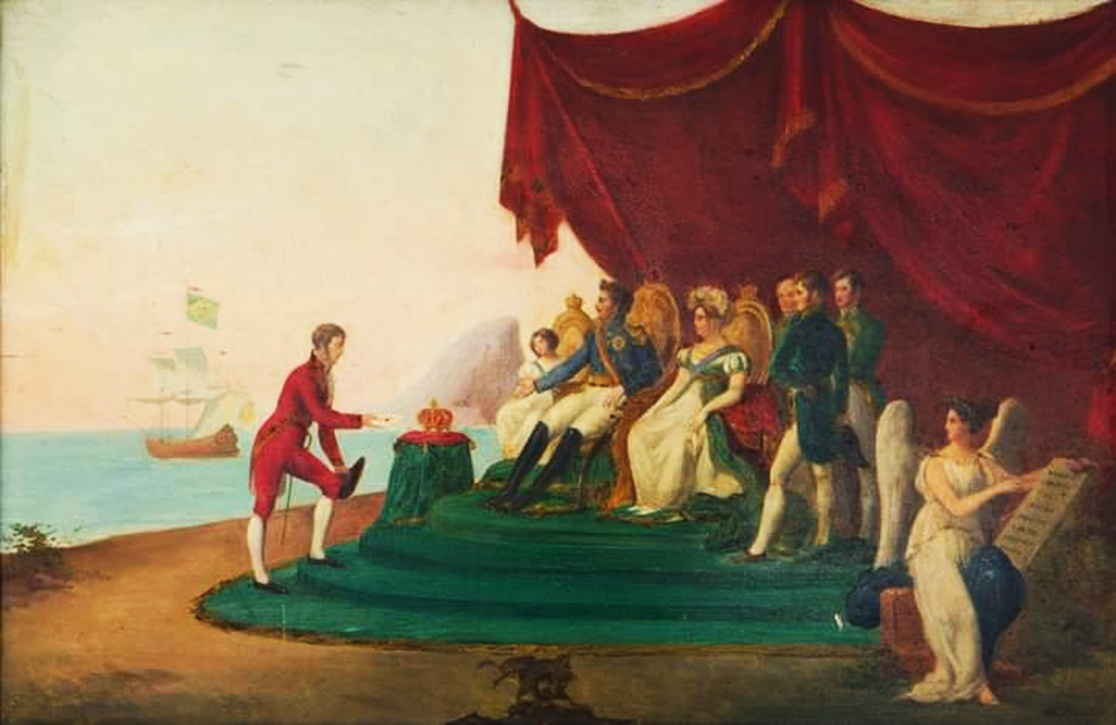
Allegory of the recognition of the Empire of Brazil and its independence. The painting depicts British diplomat Sir Charles Stuart presenting his letter of credence to Emperor Pedro I as Empress Maria Leopoldina, Princess Maria da Glória, and other dignitaries look on. At right, a winged figure, representing History, carving the "great event" on a stone tablet.

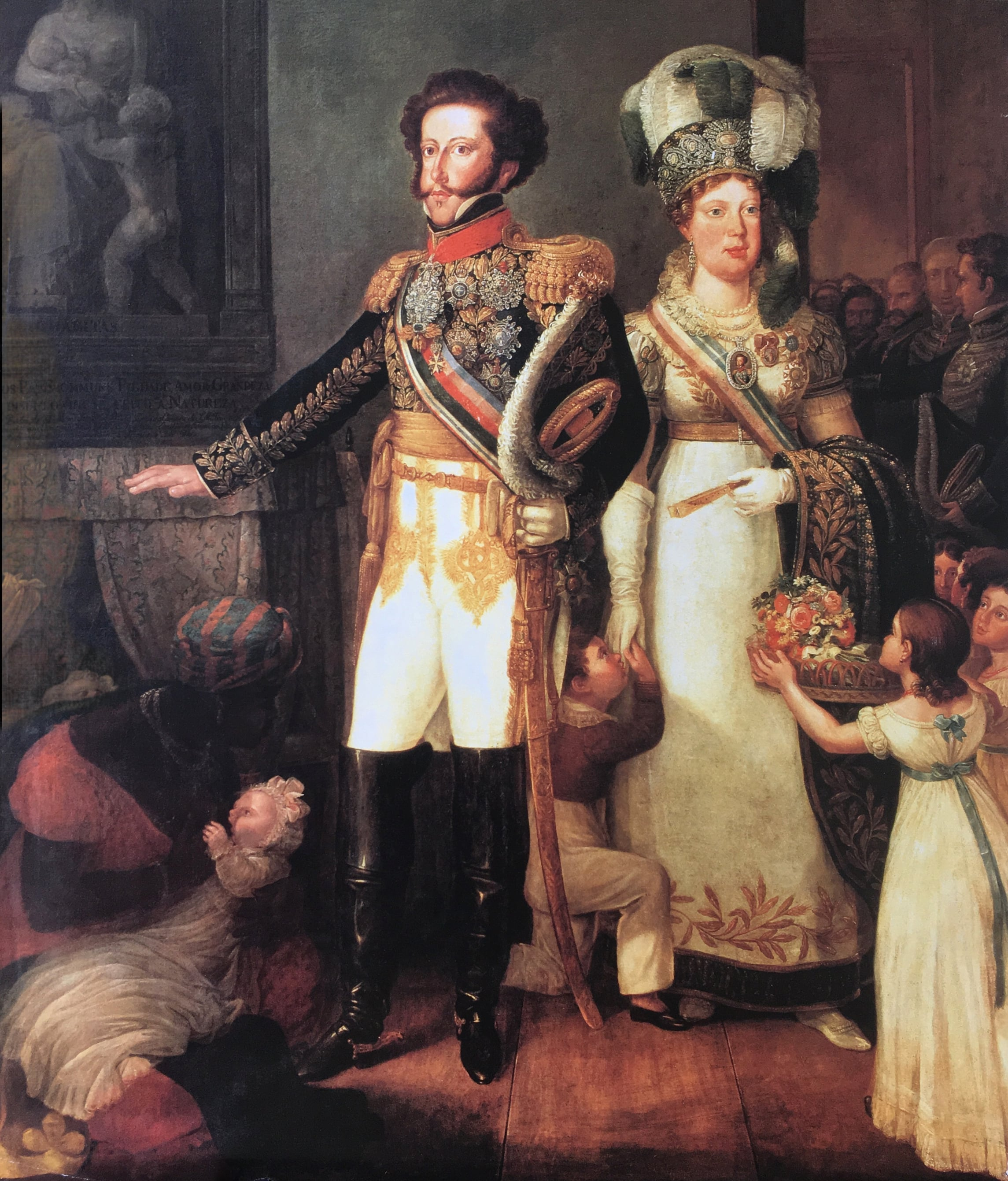
Pedro I and Maria Leopoldina visiting the Casa Dos Expostos (currently Romão Duarte orphanage) in Rio de Janeiro, by Armand Julien Pallière, 1826

King John VI of Portugal died on 10 March 1826; Dom Pedro in consequence inherited the Portuguese throne as King Pedro IV, while remaining Emperor Pedro I of Brazil. Maria Leopoldina thus became both Empress consort of Brazil and Queen consort of Portugal. However, aware that a reunion of Brazil and Portugal would be unacceptable to the people of both nations, less than two months later, on 2 May, Dom Pedro hastily abdicated the crown of Portugal in favor of their eldest daughter Maria da Glória, who became Queen Dona Maria II.

The Emperor's scandalous relationship with Domitila de Castro Canto e Melo, Marchioness of Santos, the public recognition of their illegitimate daughter, the appointment of the mistress as lady-in-waiting to the Empress, and the trip of the imperial couple together with the Marchioness of Santos to Bahia in the beginning of 1826 were events that left Maria Leopoldina totally humiliated, shaking her morally and psychologically. The daughter that the Emperor had with his mistress in May 1824 (only three months later, the Empress also gave birth) was officially legitimized by him, named Isabel Maria de Alcântara Brasileira and granted the title of Duchess of Goiás with the style of Highness and the right to use the honorific "Dona". In a letter to her sister Marie Louise, the Empress says: "The seductive monster is the cause of all my misfortunes". Solitary, isolated, devoted only to giving birth to an heir to the throne (the future Emperor Dom Pedro II would be born in 1825), Maria Leopoldina became increasingly depressed. Since the beginning of November 1826, the Empress' health rapidly waned: cramps, vomiting, bleeding and delusions were frequent in her last weeks of her life, worsened by a new pregnancy.

Maria Leopoldina was loved by all the Brazilian people, and her popularity was even greater and more expressive than that of Dom Pedro. Rio de Janeiro began to monitor the severity of the Empress' disease. The ambassador of the Kingdom of Prussia, Theremim, related with respect the public demonstrations of love for the Empress to the court of Berlin:

"The consternation among the people was indescribable; never [...] has such an unanimous feeling been seen. The people were literally on their knees pleading with the Almighty for the preservation of the Empress, the churches were not empty and in the domestic chapels everyone was on their knees, the men formed processions, not of habitual ones that almost usually provoke laughter, but of true devotion. In a word, such unexpected affection, manifested without dissimulation, must have been a real satisfaction for the sick Empress".

On 7 December 1826, the Diário Fluminense reported that the people of Rio de Janeiro continued, in their anxiety, to seek at all times to know the "afflictive state" of the Empress:

"As for the bulletins, already personally addressing the Imperial Quinta, where large and small, nationals, and foreigners, rich and poor, are mixed, with tears in their eyes, a downcast face and a heart that is bitter and uneasy, they all make the same question – How is the Empress?".

On the afternoon of the previous day (6 December), as reported by the same newspaper (and later confirmed by Father Sampaio's sermon) several processions accompanying "the Sacred Images of the respective churches" were destined for the Imperial Chapel. According to Father Sampaio:

"Was never observed on the entrance of São Cristóvão such amount of people; the carriages were run over; everyone ran in tears, however, that in the city center the prayer processions revolved, with their images, and with the accompaniment of the whole clergy, either regular or secular. The people cannot see without public signs of piety the image of Nossa Senhora da Glória, who never left her temple, and who, for the first time, under a lot of rain, went like visiting the Empress, who appeared every Saturday at the feet of its altars...There was, in a word, no brotherhood that did not take the saints of the greatest devotion to the Imperial Chapel".

=== Cause of death ===
There are disagreements about the real cause of death of the first Empress of Brazil. For some authors, Maria Leopoldina would have died as a result of puerperal sepsis, while the Emperor was in Rio Grande do Sul, where he had inspected the troops during the Cisplatine War.

The version that Maria Leopoldina died as a result of the attacks on her during a tantrum of her husband, is a widespread theory corroborated by historians such as Gabriac, Carl Seidler, John Armitage and Isabel Lustosa. The perception of real violence as the cause of death suffered a certain setback —even if a fatal assault did not necessarily reach the skeleton— with the recent exhumation of the Empress' remains where there was no bone fracture. This would have happened on 20 November 1826, when Maria Leopoldina would take over the regency so that the Emperor could travel to the South to deal with the war against Uruguay. Wanting to prove that the rumors about his extramarital relations and the bad climate between the Imperial couple were lies, Dom Pedro I decided to hold a large farewell reception where he demanded that both the Empress and his mistress the Marchioness of Santos appear together with him before the ecclesiastical and diplomatic dignitaries for the protocolary hand-kissing. With the fulfillment of this demand, Maria Leopoldina would have officially recognized her husband's mistress, and for this she defied Dom Pedro I's orders and refused to appear at the reception. The Emperor, known to have a volatile genius, had a bitter argument with his wife, and even tried to drag her around the palace, attacking her with words and kicks. At the end, he attended the hand-kissing ceremony accompanied only by the Marchioness of Santos and departed to the war with no resolution to the situation. There is no other witness of the aggression other than the three, and that the suspicions about the aggressions suffered were raised by the ladies and doctors who supported Maria Leopoldina afterwards. The reality of the facts was perhaps different:

"It was exaggerated, that Dom Pedro had kicked her, and this was the reason for her illness. The scene, witnessed by the Austrian agent [refers to the Austrian ambassador, Baron Philipp Leopold Wenzel von Mareschal], consisted of wild words. Maria Leopoldina lacked reasons for the disturbance of pregnancy, the failure of which she succumbed".

The Empress, who had been in severe depression for months and in the 12th week of pregnancy, had a profoundly damaged health. Reportedly, she send a last letter to her sister Marie Louise, dictated to the Marchioness of Aguiar, in which she mentions the terrible attack she had suffered at the hands of her husband in the presence of his mistress; however, recent studies show that this last letter from Maria Leopoldina can be a fraud. The original, in French, was never found in any file, in Brazil or abroad. The copy in the Historical Archives of the Imperial Museum in Petrópolis, is written in Portuguese, with a single sentence in French saying that the transcription was made according to an original issued on 12 December 1826. This copy, used by all scholars until then, only appeared in Rio de Janeiro on 5 August 1834 (almost eight years after the Empress's death) to be registered with the notary Joaquim José de Castro. They served as witnesses to certify the origin of the letter César Cadolino, J. M. Flach, J. Buvelot and Carlos Heindricks. Of these, evidently two, Cadolino and Flach, were greatly indebted to Maria Leopoldina and for them was nothing better than to have a "confession" made by the Empress herself.

=== Reactions ===
During Maria Leopoldina's agony, the most diverse rumors arose: that the Empress was a prisoner at the Quinta da Boa Vista, that she was being poisoned by her doctor at the behest of the Marchioness of Santos, among others. Domitila de Castro's popularity, which was no longer the best, worsened, with her house in São Cristóvão being stoned and her brother-in-law, a butler of the Empress, received two shots. The Marchioness' right to preside over medical appointments of the Empress, as her lady-in-waiting, was denied, and ministers and officials of the palace suggested that she should not continue to attend court.

The statement issued on 11 December to the Emperor about his wife's death reports seizures, high fever and delusions. Enjoying a great appreciation for the population, who admired her much more than her husband, her death was mourned by much of the nation.

This version of events was propagated to Europe, and Dom Pedro I's reputation was so tarnished that his second marriage became very difficult. It is said that the first recipient of the Imperial Order of Dom Pedro I, Emperor Francis I of Austria, would have received the award as an apology from the Brazilian emperor, his son-in-law.

Luiz Roberto Fontes – coroner who accompanied the forensic analysis of the imperial family carried out between March and August 2012 – said that a serious illness caused the miscarriage and death of Maria Leopoldina, and not a fight between the Imperial couple at Quinta da Boa Vista, in Rio de Janeiro, as he mentioned to the public in a lecture at the MusIAL (Museu do Instituto Adolfo Lutz):

"What we are able to say today is what the Empress did not die of. If there was even a fight because of Dom Pedro I's betrayal, it has nothing to do with the death of Dona Leopoldina. She had a serious infection, but we still don't know what the disease is. We need more analysis to find the cause of death. The tomography showed no fracture in the femur or other bone, dismissing the legend of falling from a ladder or the accident (provoked by Dom Pedro). From the exams, we saw that the cause could be a serious infection that she had for three weeks".

The first threat of miscarriage occurred on 19 November, when the Empress had a small bleed. With the worsening of the condition during the week, she also suffered from fever and severe diarrhea, which indicate a dangerous intestinal hemorrhage for a pregnant woman.

On 30 November, the delusions were added until medical records indicated the Empress miscarried a male fetus of about three-months-old of gestation on 2 December, days before her death. Even after losing the baby, Maria Leopoldina's health did not improve and started to have more and more delusions, fever and hemorrhages, "that is, she was in a clear septic picture, a picture of death", said the coroner.

=== Death and preservation of memory ===
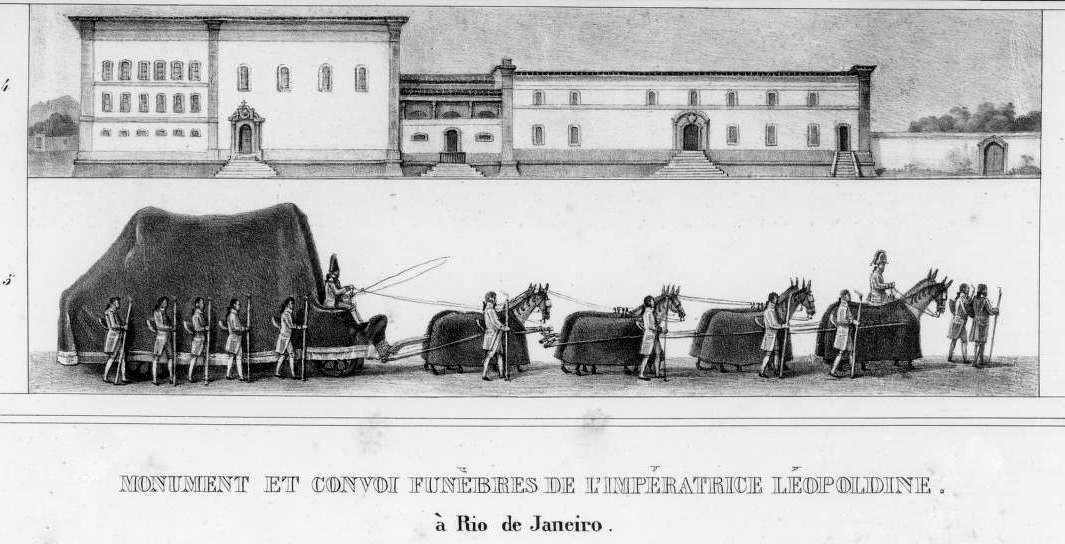
Maria Leopoldina's funeral procession in Rio de Janeiro, 1826. Drawing made by Debret.

Maria Leopoldina died at the São Cristóvão Palace in the Quinta da Boa Vista, located in the neighborhood of São Cristóvão, in the northern part of the city of Rio de Janeiro on 11 December 1826, five weeks before her 30th birthday. The funeral ceremony was chaired by Francisco do Monte Alverne, official preacher of the Empire of Brazil.

Her body, covered with the imperial mantle, was placed in three urns: the first made of Portuguese pine, the second made of lead (with its own Latin inscription, on which there was a skull with two crossed tibias, and on this, the imperial coat silver) and the third of cedar.

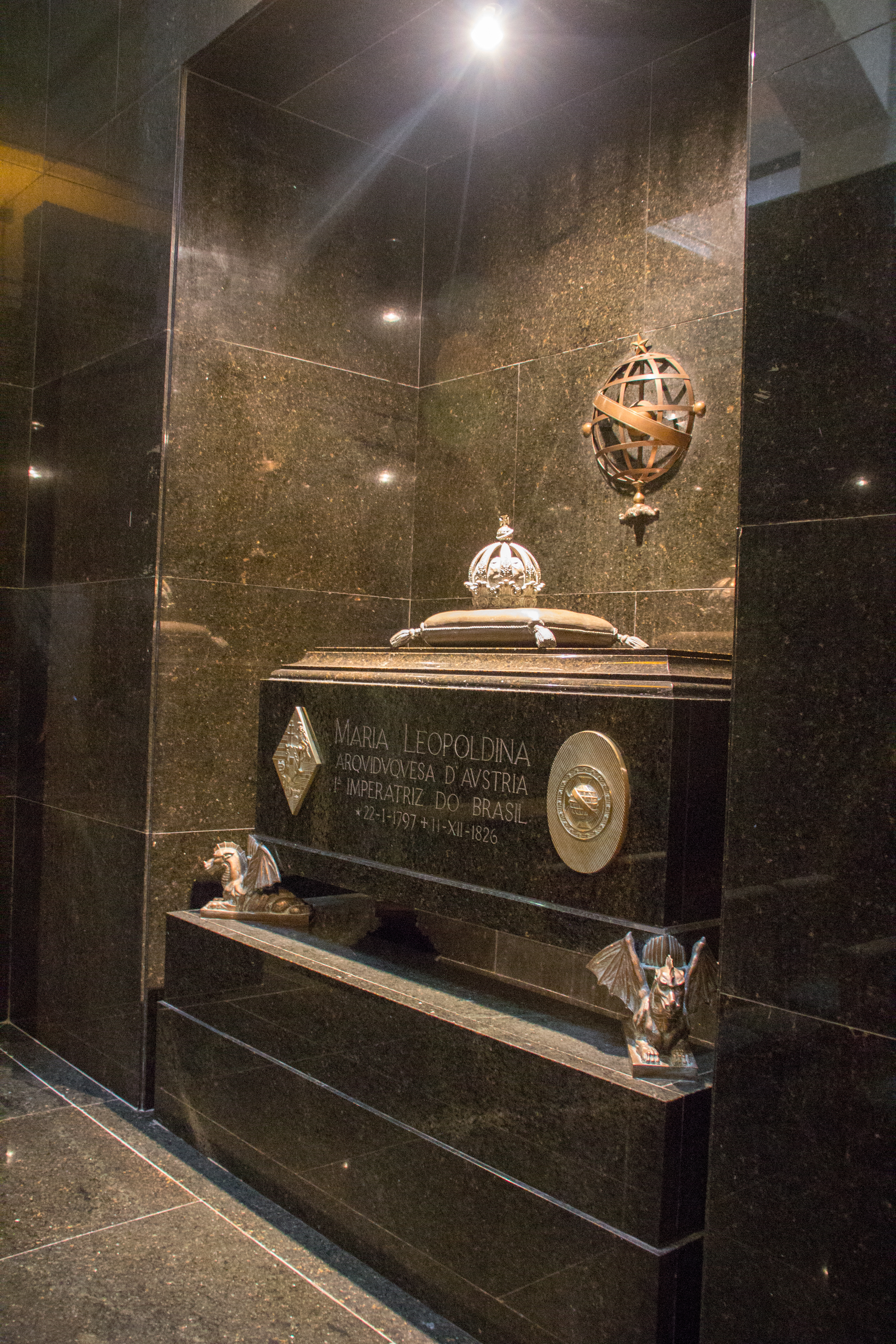
Sarcophagus of Empress Maria Leopoldina in the Monument to the Independence of Brazil in São Paulo.

She was buried on 14 December 1826 in the church of the Ajuda Convent (currently the Cinelândia). When the convent was demolished in 1911, her remains were transferred to the Santo Antônio Convent, also in Rio de Janeiro, where a mausoleum was built for her and some members of the imperial family. In 1954, her remains were definitively transferred to a green granite sarcophagus decorated with gold, in the Imperial Crypt and Chapel, under the Ipiranga Monument, in the city of São Paulo.

== Legacy ==
Although she is portrayed as a melancholic woman and humiliated by the scandals and extramarital relations of Dom Pedro I (representing her as the fragile link in a love triangle), the most recent historiography has given Maria Leopoldina a less passive image in national history.

Maria Leopoldina had great prominence in Brazilian politics, either when the Portuguese court returned to Portugal, or behind the scenes of the friction between Brazil and Portugal until the moment of Independence in 1822. While Dom Pedro I still maintained the possibility of maintaining the United Kingdom with Portugal, Maria Leopoldina had already found that the most prudent path was the total emancipation of the metropolis. Maria Leopoldina's intellectual and political education, combined with her strong sense of duty and sacrifice on behalf of the State, were fundamental to Brazil, especially after King John VI, under Portuguese pressure, was forced to return to Lisbon. Since she was an Archduchess of Austria and member of the House of Habsburg-Lorraine and who had been educated under an aristocratic and absolutist regime, Maria Leopoldina did not hesitate to defend ideals and more representative forms of government for Brazil, influenced by liberalism and constitutionalism.

Brazilians had great respect and admiration for Maria Leopoldina from the first moments when she set foot in Brazil. Very popular (a view even stronger among the poorest and slaves), from the moment of her death she had started to be called the "Mother of Brazilians". Petitions were made for the Empress to receive the title of "Guardian Angel of this nascent Empire". During the period in which she was ill in her last days of life, processions were carried out on the streets of Rio de Janeiro; churches and chapels filled with people in deep sadness. The news of her death caused a stir throughout the city. The people took to the streets in tears, and there are reports of slaves who lamented with screams: "Our mother died. What will become of us? Who will take sides with blacks?". With her death, the popularity of Dom Pedro I, allied to the problems of the first reign, declined considerably. The writer and biographer of her life, Carlos H. Oberacker Júnior, says that "rarely has a foreigner been so dear and recognized by a people like her".

During her life, Maria Leopoldina looked for ways to end slavery. In an attempt to change the type of labor in Brazil, the Empress encouraged European immigration to the country. Maria Leopoldina's arrival in Brazil fostered the beginning of German immigration to the country, first coming from the Swiss, settling in Rio de Janeiro and founding the city of Nova Friburgo. Then, to populate southern Brazil, the Empress encouraged the Germans to come. The presence of Maria Leopoldina in South America attracted attention as a way to "propagandize" Brazil among the Germanic milieu. Colônia Leopoldina, a former settlement in southern Bahia founded by Swiss and Germans, was named after Maria Leopoldina.

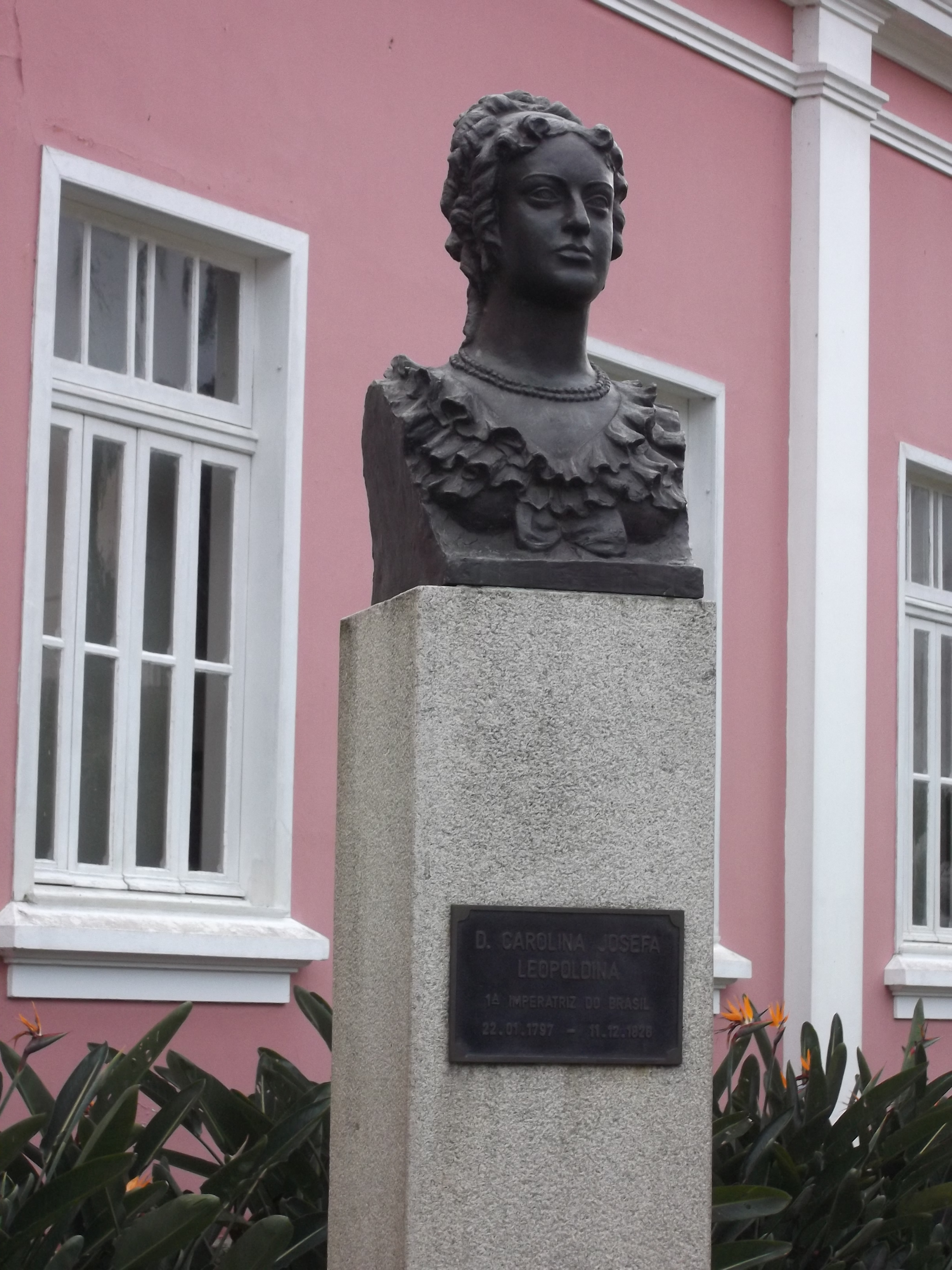
Bust of Maria Leopoldina at the Imperial Museum of Brazil

The importance and relevance of the Empress on Brazilian soil is also due to the fact of the scientific mission that accompanied her on a journey from the Italian Peninsula, composed of European painters, scientists and botanists. As Maria Leopoldina was interested in botany and geology, two German scientists came with her: botanist Carl Friedrich Philipp von Martius and zoologist Johann Baptist von Spix, known names in the natural sciences of the 19th century, in addition to the traveling painter Thomas Ender. The research of this mission resulted in the works Viagem pelo Brasil and Flora Brasiliensis, a compendium of approximately 20,000 pages with classification and illustration of thousands of species of native plants. Together, the scientists traveled another 10,000 kilometers from Rio de Janeiro to the borders with Peru and Colombia.

Maria Leopoldina's stance in refusing to return to Portugal still divides opinions, because while for a group of writers that was a revolutionary attitude, for others the Archduchess was just a strategist. For Maria Celi Chaves Vasconcelos, a professor at UERJ and a specialist in the education of noble women, there is not the slightest trace of rebellion in any writing by or about Maria Leopoldina: "Would it be revolutionary because it influenced Dom Pedro in the Proclamation of Independence? I don't think there is any revolutionary trait there; I think she was, perhaps, knowledgeable enough about political history to make the correct judgment about the moment lived and how much he was conducive to Independence", defends the researcher. "Regardless of the reasons that made Maria Leopoldina stay in Brazil, the Empress must be interpreted as a revolutionary woman because she was the first to make politics in the high sphere of Brazilian decisions", defends historian Paulo Rezzutti.

== Depictions in culture ==
Empress Maria Leopoldina has already been portrayed as a character in cinema and television, being played by Kate Hansen in the film Independência ou Morte (1972), by Maria Padilha in the miniseries Marquesa de Santos (1984) and by Érika Evantini in the miniseries O Quinto dos Infernos (2002).

Maria Leopoldina's life was also the subject of the 1996 plot of the samba school Imperatriz Leopoldinense, whose name already derives indirectly from her (because the school is based in the area of the Estrada de Ferro Leopoldina, named in honor of the Empress). On the occasion, the carnival designer and professor Rosa Magalhães received support from the Austrian government for the parade.

In 2007, the actress Ester Elias gave life to Maria Leopoldina in the musical Império, by Miguel Falabella, which tells part of the history of the Empire of Brazil.

In 2017, actress Letícia Colin played the Empress Maria Leopoldina in the telenovela Novo Mundo.

In 2018, Maria Leopoldina and Imperatriz Leopoldinense were honored by the Tom Maior samba school, at the São Paulo carnival.

== Honours ==
Styles of Empress Leopoldina of Brazil
- Reference style: Her Imperial Majesty
- Spoken style: Your Imperial Majesty

- United Kingdom of Portugal, Brazil and the Algarves:
  - Dame Grand Mistress of the Order of Saint Isabel
  - Dame Grand Cross of the Order of the Immaculate Conception of Vila Viçosa
- Empire of Brazil:
  - Dame Grand Cross of the Order of Pedro I
  - Dame Grand Cross of the Order of the Southern Cross
- Austrian Empire: Dame of the Order of the Starry Cross
- Spain: Dame of the Order of Queen Maria Luisa
- Kingdom of Bavaria: Dame of the Order of Saint Elizabeth

== Children ==
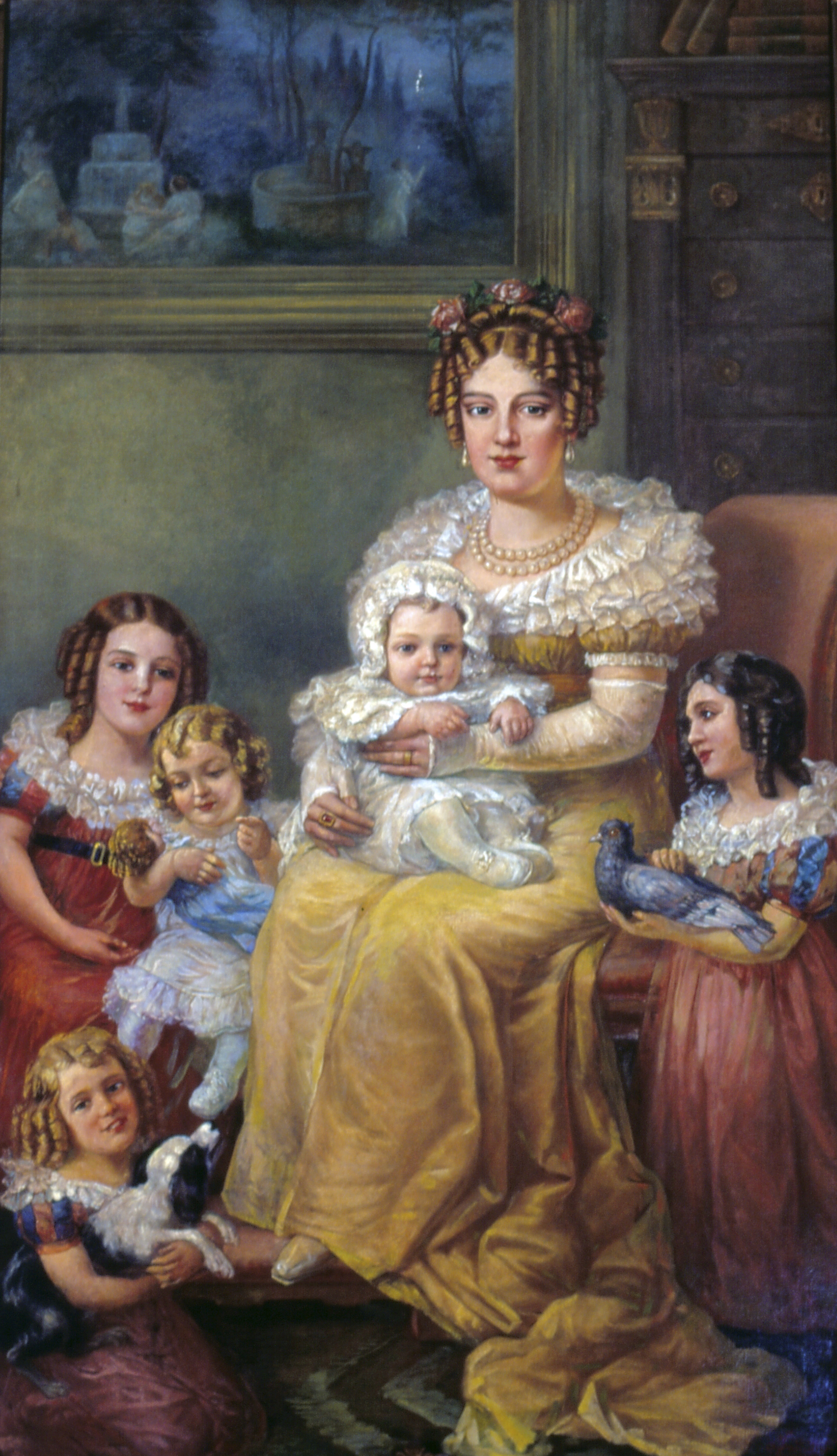
Empress Maria Leopoldina of Brazil with her children, by Domenico Failutti, 1921

By June 1818 Maria Leopoldina became pregnant, and her first child, Maria da Glória, was born after a difficult delivery on 4 April 1819. Her next pregnancy ended in a miscarriage in November 1819, and on 26 April 1820 she suffered her second miscarriage; the child, a son, was named Miguel in honor of his paternal uncle and died almost immediately. These failed pregnancies had a profound effect on Maria Leopoldina, who, conscious of her primary duty to produce an heir to the House of Bragança, became depressed and withdrew from society for a time. Her first living son, João Carlos, Prince of Beira, was born on 6 March 1821, to the joy of the court and the people, but died on 4 February 1822 aged 11 months. Her next three pregnancies resulted in three daughters, Januária (born 11 March 1822), Paula (born 17 February 1823) and Francisca (born 2 August 1824) until the birth of the long-hoped for son and heir, the future Emperor Dom Pedro II, on 2 December 1825. Her ninth and last pregnancy was fatal to her: she died from complications following a miscarriage.

Name	Portrait	Lifespan	Notes
Maria II of Portugal	Painting showing the head and shoulders of a young woman wearing a lacey blue dress with auburn hair pulled back	4 April 1819 – 15 November 1853	Queen of Portugal from 1826 until 1853. Maria II's first husband, Auguste de Beauharnais, 2nd Duke of Leuchtenberg, died a few months after the marriage. Her second husband was Prince Ferdinand of Saxe-Coburg and Gotha, who became King Dom Fernando II after the birth of their first child. She had eleven children from this marriage. Maria II was heiress presumptive to her brother Pedro II as Princess Imperial until her exclusion from the Brazilian line of succession by law no. 91 of 30 October 1835.
Miguel, Prince of Beira		26 April 1820	Prince of Beira from birth to his death.
João Carlos, Prince of Beira		6 March 1821 – 4 February 1822	Prince of Beira from birth to his death.
Princess Januária of Brazil		11 March 1822 – 13 March 1901	Married Prince Luigi, Count of Aquila, son of Don Francesco I, King of the Two Sicilies. She had four children from this marriage. Officially recognized as an Infanta of Portugal on 4 June 1822, she was later considered excluded from the Portuguese line of succession after Brazil became independent.
Princess Paula of Brazil		17 February 1823 – 16 January 1833	She died age 9, probably of meningitis. Born in Brazil after its independence, Paula was excluded from the Portuguese line of succession.
Princess Francisca of Brazil		2 August 1824 – 27 March 1898	Married Prince François, Prince of Joinville, son of Louis Philippe I, King of the French. She had three children from this marriage. Born in Brazil after its independence, Francisca was excluded from the Portuguese line of succession.
Pedro II of Brazil		2 December 1825 – 5 December 1891	Emperor of Brazil from 1831 until 1889. He was married to Teresa Cristina of the Two Sicilies, daughter of Don Francesco I, King of the Two Sicilies. He had four children from this marriage. Born in Brazil after its independence, Pedro II was excluded from the Portuguese line of succession and did not become King Dom Pedro V of Portugal upon his father's abdication.

== Ancestry ==
Ancestors of Maria Leopoldina of Austria

8. Francis I, Holy Roman Emperor (= 14)
4. Leopold II, Holy Roman Emperor
9. Maria Theresa of Austria (= 15)
2. Francis II, Holy Roman Emperor
10. Charles III of Spain (= 12)
5. Maria Luisa of Spain
11. Maria Amalia of Saxony (= 13)
1. Maria Leopoldina of Austria
12. Charles III of Spain (= 10)
6. Ferdinand I of the Two Sicilies
13. Maria Amalia of Saxony (= 11)
3. Maria Theresa of Naples and Sicily
14. Francis I, Holy Roman Emperor (= 8)
7. Maria Carolina of Austria
15. Maria Theresa of Austria (= 9)

== Footnotes ==
Maria Leopoldina of Austria House of Habsburg-Lorraine Cadet branch of the House of Lorraine Born: 22 January 1797 Died: 11 December 1826
Royal titles
New title Empire of Brazil established	Empress consort of Brazil; 12 October 1822 – 11 December 1826	Vacant Title next held by Amélie of Leuchtenberg
Preceded by Carlota Joaquina of Spain	Queen consort of Portugal; 10 March 1826 – 2 May 1826	Vacant Title next held by Auguste de Beauharnais as prince consort
