= Vila Viçosa (disambiguation) =

Vila Viçosa may refer to:

- Vila Viçosa, a municipality in Alentejo, Portugal
- Venilale, a town in East Timor formerly known as Vila Viçosa
- Nova Viçosa, a municipality in Brazil formerly known as Vila Viçosa
