= Georg Wilhelm Freyreiss =

German naturalist (1789–1825)

- Born: July 12, 1789; Free City of Frankfurt, Holy Roman Empire
- Died: April 1, 1825 (aged 35); Nova Viçosa, Bahia, Brazil

Georg Wilhelm Freyreiss (Note: Another source gives his name as Jorge Guilherme Freyreiss.) (12 July 1789, in Frankfurt am Main – 1 April 1825, in Nova Viçosa) was a German naturalist.

As an assistant naturalist, he traveled to Rio de Janeiro in 1813 with Grigory Langsdorff, the newly appointed Russian consul to Brazil. Here, he met with Lorentz Westin (1787–1846), the Swedish-Norwegian general consul, who provided the necessary means for Freyreiss to travel and explore the country's interior. With geologist Wilhelm Ludwig von Eschwege, he visited various locations in Minas Gerais, during which, he collected numerous ornithological, entomological and botanical specimens.

From August 1815, along with Friedrich Sellow and Prince Maximilian of Wied-Neuwied, he collected natural history specimens in the province of Bahia for several European institutions. In 1818 he was named a professor of zoology at the University of Rio de Janeiro.

In 1824 he published Beiträge zur näheren Kenntniss des Kaiserthums Brasilien ("Contributions to the knowledge of the empire of Brazil"). Another work attributed to Freyreiss is Reisen in Brasilien (1968), a book on Brazil that was published many years after his death. Taxa with the specific epithet of freyreissii honor his name, examples being the botanical species Ophryosporus freyreissii and Paepalanthus freyreissii.
