= Posto da Mata =

- District
- Interactive map of Posto da Mata
- Coordinates: 17°53′S 39°51′W
- Country: Brazil
- State: Bahia
- Municipality: Nova Viçosa
- Origin: Former train station in Atlantic forest

Population
  - Total: 20,000+
- Time zone: UTC−3 (BRT)

Posto da Mata is a district of the municipality of Nova Viçosa in the state of Bahia, Brazil. The name literally means a station in the woods, as there was a train station in the middle of the Atlantic forest that connected the south of the state of Bahia with the east of Minas Gerais, serving as a place to recharge the fuel.

The district is the largest of all three in the municipality, having a population of over 20 000 people.
