= Colônia Leopoldina, Alagoas =

Municipality in Alagoas, Brazil

Colônia Leopoldina
- Municipality of Alagoas, Brazil
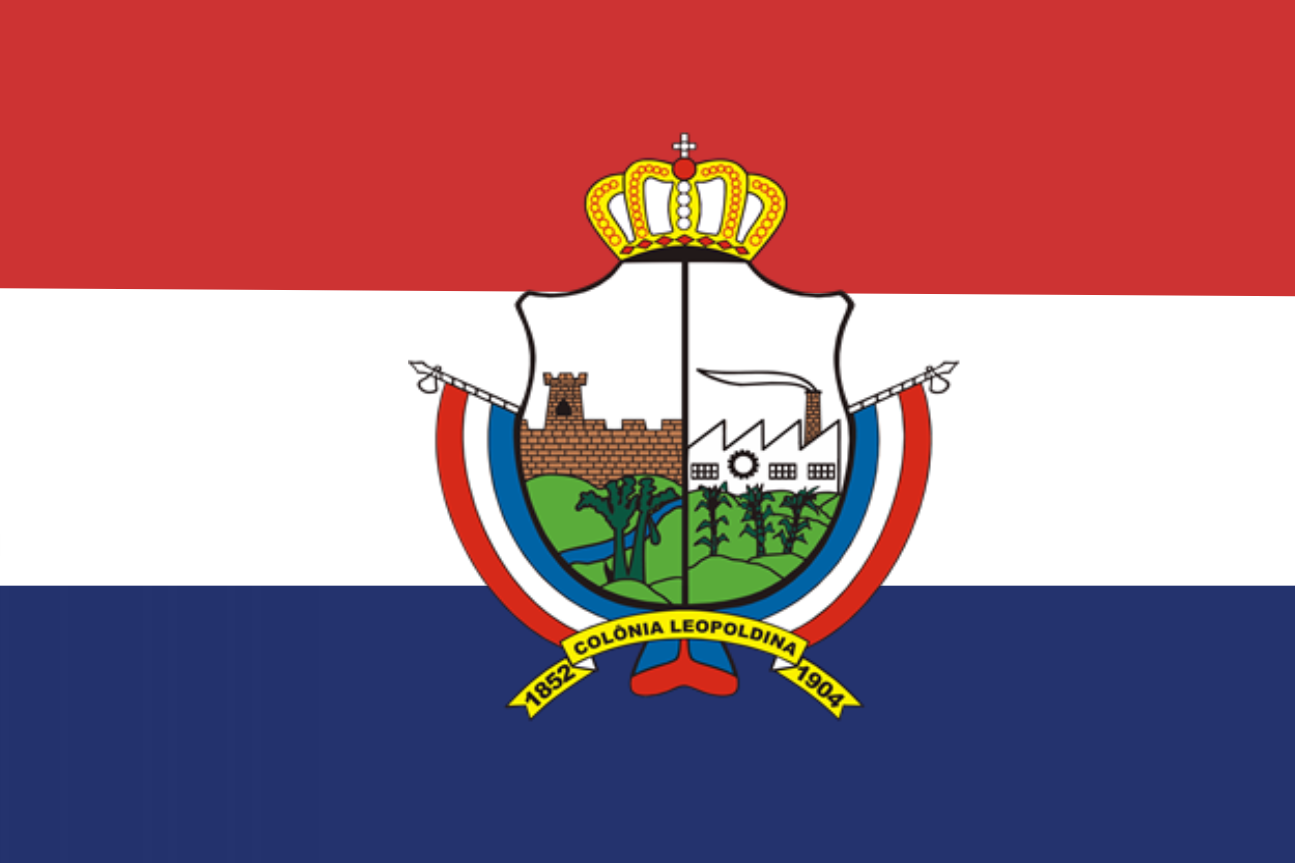
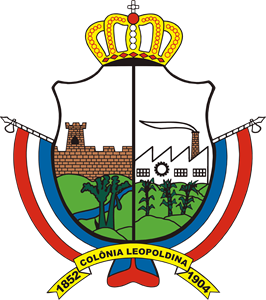
- Flag Coat of arms

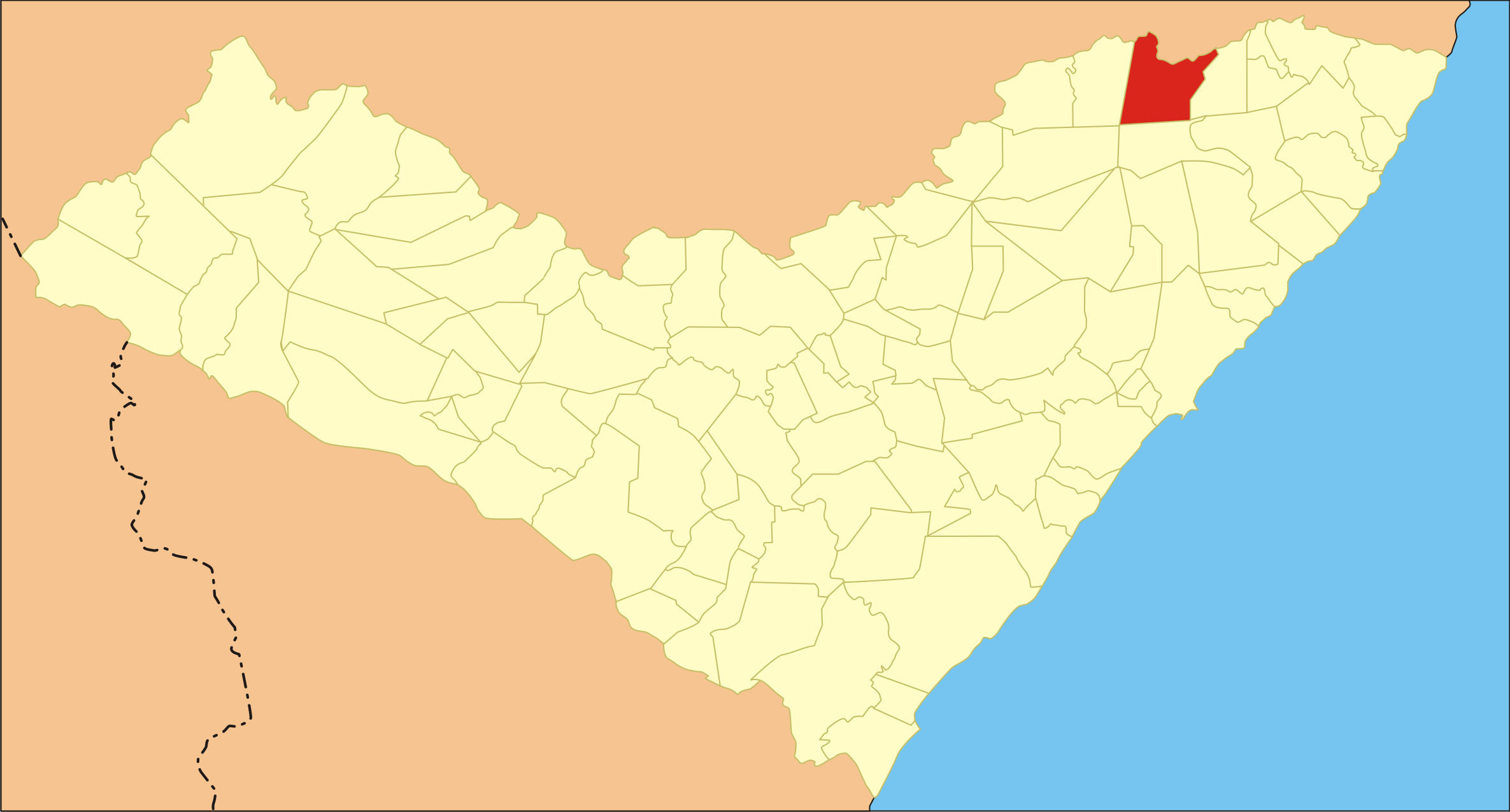
- Location of Colônia Leopoldina in Alagoas

- Location within Brazil Location within South America
- Coordinates: 8°54′50″S 35°43′30″W
- Country: Brazil
- Region: Northeast
- State: Alagoas
- Founded: 12 June 1901

Government
  - Mayor: Alexandre Gilberto Sobreira (MDB) (2025-2028)
  - Vice Mayor: Luciana Medeiros de Luna Freitas (PSB) (2025-2028)

Area
  - Total: 207.935 km^{2} (80.284 sq mi)
- Elevation: 140 m (460 ft)

Population (2022)
  - Total: 15,816
  - Density: 76.06/km^{2} (197.0/sq mi)
- Demonym: Leopoldinense (Brazilian Portuguese)
- Time zone: UTC-03:00 (Brasília Time)
- Postal code: 57975-000
- HDI (2010): 0.517 – low
- Website: colonialeopoldina.al.gov.br

Colônia Leopoldina (Central northeastern portuguese pronunciation: [kɔˈlɔ̃njɐ ˈlewpodinɐ]) is a municipality located in the Brazilian state of Alagoas. Its population is 21,818 (2020) and its area is 287 km^{2} (111 sq mi).
