= Georg Anton Schäffer =

German physician (1779–1836)

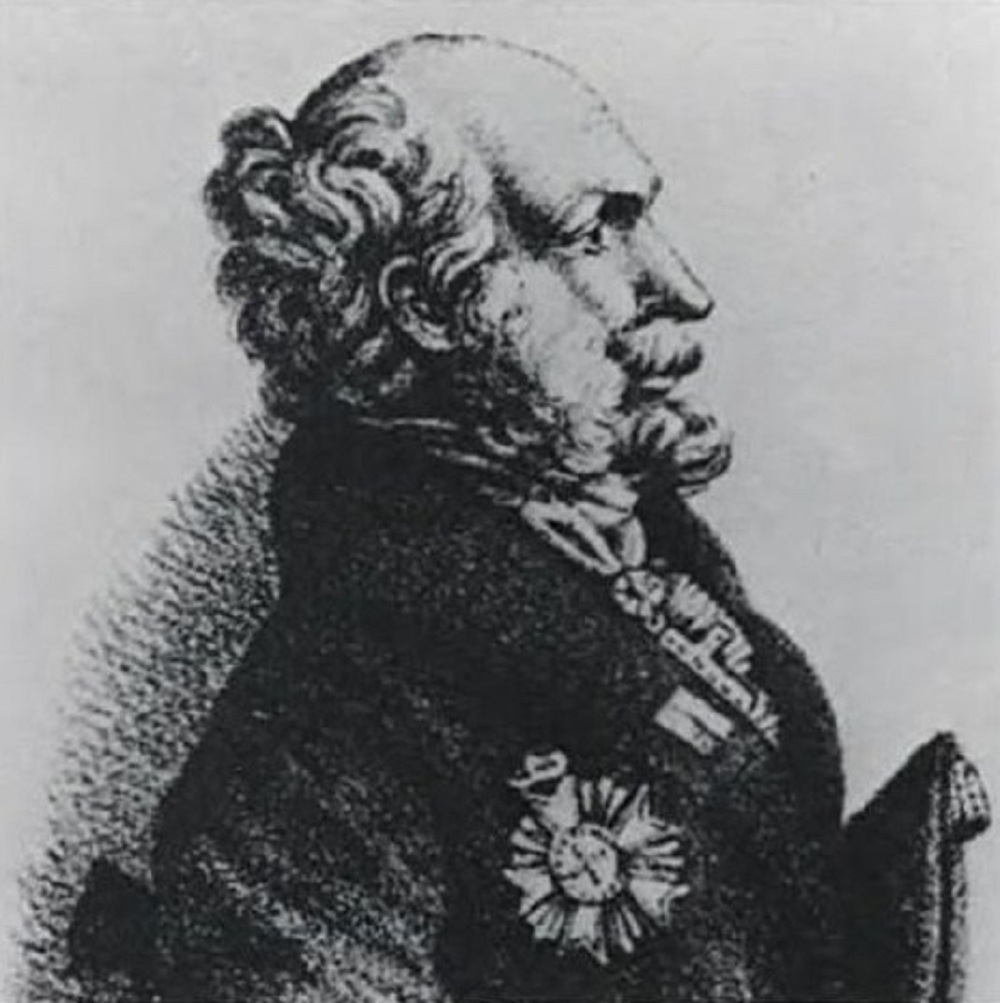
- Georg Anton Schäffer.
- Born: 27 January 1779; Münnerstadt, Bavaria
- Died: 1836 (aged 56–57); Jacarandá, Brazil
- Education: Juliusspital College of Medicine
- Occupation: Physician
- Known for: Attempted to conquer Hawaii for the Company and, ultimately, the Russian Empire
- Medical career
- Field: Surgery
- Institutions: Russian-American Company

Georg Anton Schäffer (Note: Also known by his Russian name Yegor Nikolayevich, or Egor Antonovich Sheffer; von Schaeffer in Portuguese sources.) (27 January 1779 – 1836) was a German medical doctor in the employ of the Russian-American Company who attempted to conquer Hawaii for the Company and, ultimately, the Russian Empire. The bloodless Schäffer affair (1815–1817) or the Hawaiian spectacular, as it was called by contemporary Russians, became a significant financial blunder for the Company.

In the 1820s, Schäffer became an agent of the Empire of Brazil and recruited thousands of German emigrants, the ancestors of many members of the present-day German Brazilian community, for resettlement in Brazil.

== Early life ==
Georg Anton Schäffer was born at Münnerstadt, Bavaria on 27 January 1779, in the Franconia region, as son of a distillery owner. He studied medicine at Würzburg's Juliusspital College of Medicine. He joined Imperial Russian service as a surgeon, serving in Moscow before 1812. During Napoleon's invasion of Russia he was involved in Frantz Leppich's ill-fated combat balloon project. In 1813, he was a ship surgeon on board the Suvorov. Disagreements with the captain prompted Schäffer to disembark the ship in New Archangel (present day Sitka, Alaska). Governor of the Russian-American Company, Alexander Baranov, who also happened to be at odds with Suvorov's captain, hired Schäffer into the Company's service.

== Schäffer affair ==
In 1815 Schäffer sailed to Hawaii to retrieve the Company goods left in the wreck of the Bering, which had been seized by Kaumualii, chief of Kauai island. A simple mission led by an inexperienced but ambitious physician unfolded into a major blunder for the Company. Kaumualii, who sought outside help in his domestic rivalry with king Kamehameha, invited Schäffer to his island and manipulated him into believing that the Russian-American Company could easily take over and colonize Hawaii. Schäffer, "losing all touch with reality", planned a full-blown naval assault of the rest of Hawaiian islands and sought support for his "conquest" in Saint Petersburg. Mounting resistance of Native Hawaiians and American traders forced Schäffer to admit defeat and leave Hawaii in July 1817, before his triumphant reports from Kauai reached the Russian court. The Company recognized a loss of not less than 200,000 roubles but continued entertaining "The Hawaiian project" until 1821. The Company then sued Schäffer for damages, but after an inconclusive legal standoff found it easier to let him go back to Germany.

== Return to Europe ==
In July 1818 Schäffer arrived in Denmark where he learned that Emperor Alexander I left Russia to attend a congress in Aachen. He did not get through to the tsar, instead sending his reports to Nesselrode and Ioannis Kapodistrias. He pleaded the tsar to give a go-ahead for another incursion, taking Hawaii "in one blow, with such a military force that would be sufficient to both guarantee Russian possession and instill respect". Schäffer claimed that "though not of the military profession, I am quite familiar with weaponry and, moreover, I have enough experience and courage..." for the job.

The case was delayed until Alexander's return to Russia, and again involved bureaucratic review by various state offices. In March 1819 Schaffer, fearing a final refusal, submitted another proposal. This time he demonized the Americans and their alleged goal of pushing the Russians out of the region, one colony at a time. According to Schäffer, leaving Hawaii to the Americans would spell a loss of all Russian possessions in the region. A preemptive strike at Hawaii, he wrote, was essential to retain the Russian America. The directors of the Company continued raising similar proposals, until Nesselrode voiced his and Alexander's firm aversion against any conflicts in the Pacific.

Remnants of the Hawaiian project promoted by Peter Dobell and Anders Ljungstedt circulated inside the Company until 1821. Matvey Myravyov, the Governor of the Russian-American Company in 1820–1825, closed the debate saying that "Schäffer staged a funny comedy and the Company paid dearly for it. I do not think that it can ever be played again. As for merely having a midway harbor and a supply of fresh food—there are no and there will be no obstacles to it anyway."

The Company attempted suing Schäffer for damages but he counter-attacked, demanding reimbursement for his alleged business expenses, and in the end the Company found it easier to simply let him go back to Germany. By this time the United States established a permanent consulate in Honolulu; Kaumualii, the only ally of Russians, was subdued by Kamehameha's son and successor Liholiho.

== Brazilian adventures ==
Instead of settling in Europe, in 1821 Schäffer organized a group of 47 Germans aspiring to flee their homeland and took them on a journey across the Atlantic, to Brazil. Schäffer's group was granted lands in Bahia and set up Frankental, the first successful German settlement in Brazil.

In September 1822 the Brazilian government dispatched Schäffer to Frankfurt to recruit more European settlers. He arrived in 1823, styling himself as a major and a plenipotentiary of Dom Pedro I of Brazil. This mission effectively launched the German emigration to Brazil. Schäffer was credited with bringing 5,000 Germans over five years (1824–1828). They settled in rural colonies; some of these ultimately failed (e.g. São João das Missões), others (São Leopoldo, Novo Hamburgo) exist to date. Schäffer's Germans also formed the core of the first foreign units of the emerging Brazilian Army: all unmarried men landing in Brazil faced compulsory military service, a fact that Schäffer did not advertise in advance (his German recruits had to sign a thorough eight-part contract that did not mention the draft obligations). Carlos Oberacker suggested that militarization of German settlers was Schäffer's own proposal, based on his knowledge of the Russian Cossacks.

Schäffer's unorthodox sense of reality backfired in Brazil, twice. In 1827 Schäffer returned to Brazil and applied to the king for a noble style of marquis; Dom Pedro refused, providing only a cash reward. In 1829 Schäffer demanded a different favor, this time of being appointed the Brazilian ambassador to a European court, and was rejected again.

Schäffer stayed in Brazil despite these setbacks, until his death at Jacarandá, in 1836.

== Bibliography ==
- Nikolay Bolkhovitinov (1973). Adventures of Doctor Schäffer in Hawaii, 1815–1819. Hawaiian Journal of History, 1973 volume 7 pp. 55–78.
- Nikolay Bolkhovitinov (1997, in Russian). Istoriya Russkoy Ameriki (История Русской Америки). ISBN 5-7133-0883-9. Volume 2, chapter 7, pp. 276–302: Russians on the Hawaii, 1804–1825. Contains a revised version of the 1973 article on the Adventures of Doctor Schäffer in Hawaii.
- Lee B Croft (2012). George Anton Schaeffer: Killing Napoleon From the Air. Sphynx Publications. ISBN 978-1-105-88437-5. pp. 14, 53.
- Lee B Croft (2012). George Anton Schaeffer: Arm Wrestling Kamehameha. Sphynx Publications. ISBN 978-0-9858908-1-0.
- Lee B Croft (2012). George Anton Schaeffer: Shipping Germans to Brazil. Sphynx Publications. ISBN 978-0-9858908-2-7. p. 141.
- Gavan Daws (1968). Shoal of time: a history of the Hawaiian Islands. University of Hawaii Press. ISBN 978-0-8248-0324-7. pp. 49–53.
- Lars Degen (2008, in German). Aspekte deutscher Auswanderung nach Lateinamerika: Das Beispiel Brasilien. GRIN Verlag. ISBN 978-3-640-13947-7
- Angela Maria de Castro Gomes (2002, in Portuguese. Histórias de imigrantes e de imigração no Rio de Janeiro. 7Letras. ISBN 978-85-7388-222-3
- Neill Macaulay (1986). Dom Pedro: the struggle for liberty in Brazil and Portugal, 1798–1834. Duke University Press. ISBN 978-0-8223-0681-8. p. 188
- Peter R. Mills (2002). Hawaii's Russian adventure: a new look at old history. University of Hawaii Press. ISBN 978-0-8248-2404-4.
- Claus Naske, Herman E. Slotnick (1994). Alaska: A History of the 49th State. Oklahoma University Press. ISBN 978-0-8061-2573-2.
- Johann Jakob von Tschudi (1867, in German). Reisen durch Südamerika, Volumes 3–4. F. A. Brockhaus.
