= Nova Viçosa =

Municipality of Bahia, Brazil

Coordinates: 17°53′S 39°22′W

- Municipality
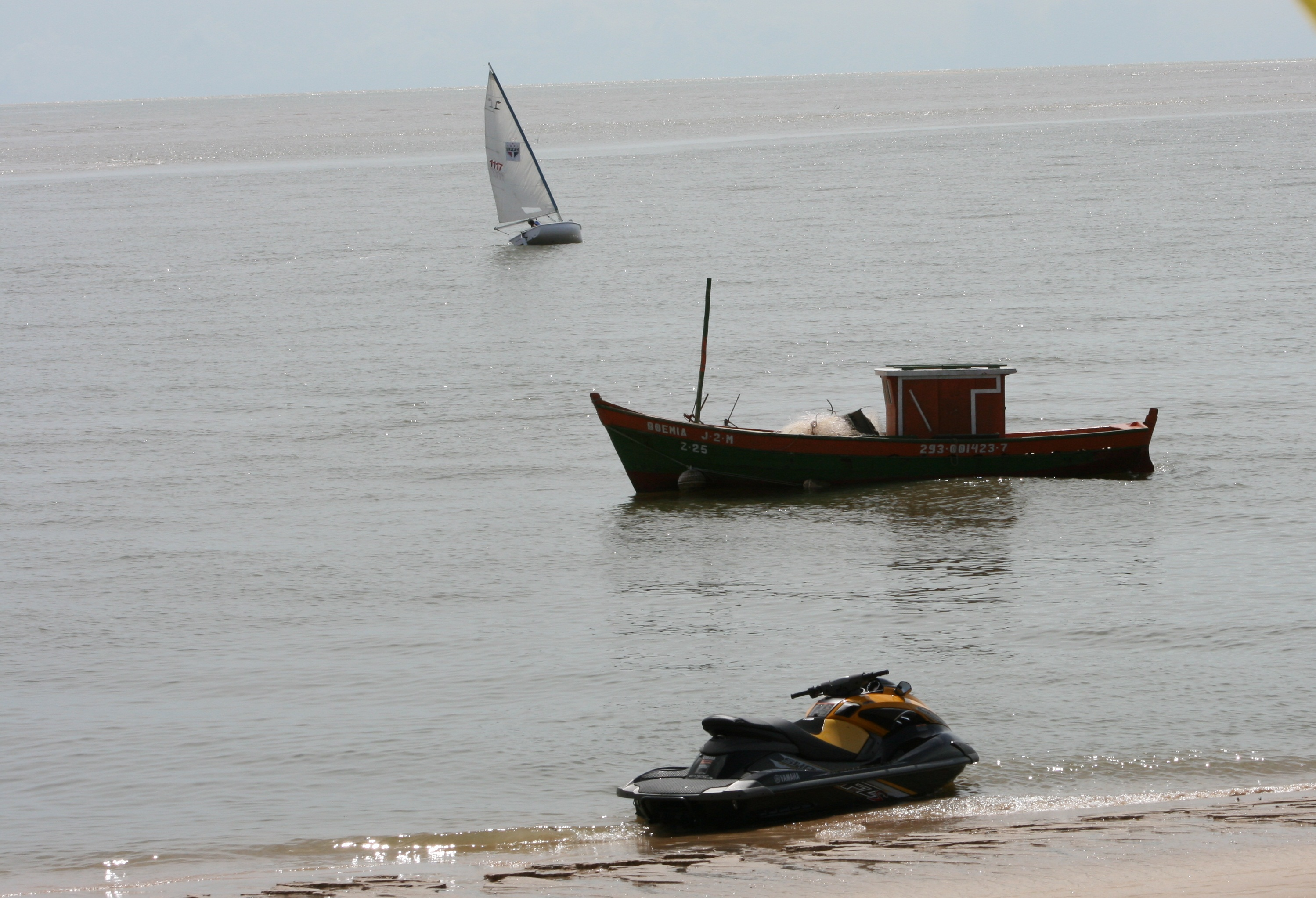
- Fishing boat at Nova Viçosa

- Flag Coat of arms

- Location in Bahia
- Country: Brazil
- Region: Nordeste
- State: Bahia
- Mesoregion: Sul Baiano

Population (2020)
  - Total: 43,783
- Time zone: UTC−3 (BRT)

Nova Viçosa is a municipality in the state of Bahia in the North-East region of Brazil. It was "discovered" in 1720 and became a municipality in 1962. The municipality contains part of the Cassurubá Extractive Reserve, a 100,768-hectare (249,000-acre) sustainable use conservation unit that protects an area of mangroves, river and sea where shellfish are harvested.

Nova Viçosa has a district called Posto da Mata, where a sub-prefecture.

Nova Viçosa used to be known as Vila Viçosa.

== See also ==
- List of municipalities in Bahia
