= Domitila de Castro, Marchioness of Santos =

Brazilian noblewoman (1797–1867)

Domitila de Castro
- Marchioness of Santos
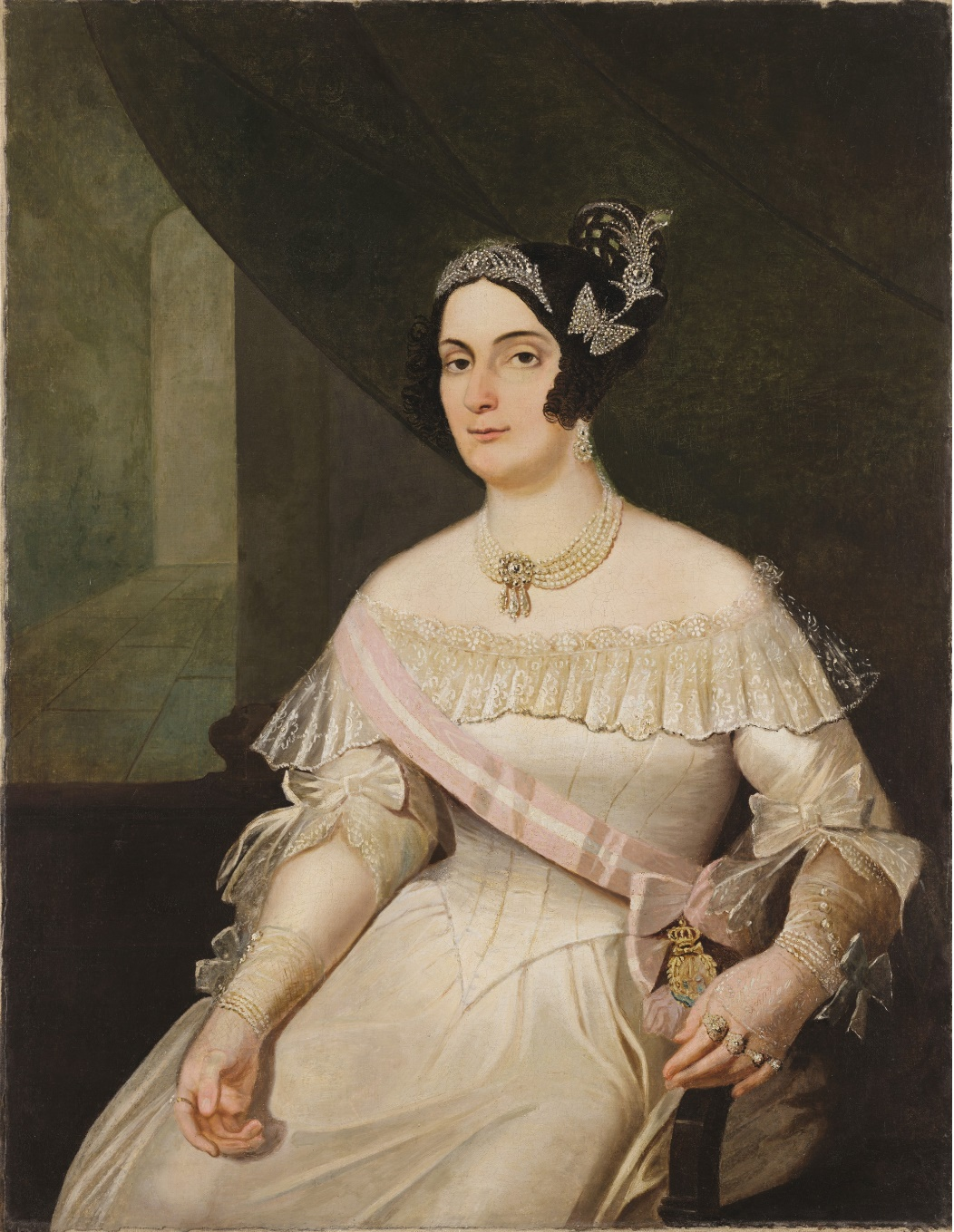
- Portrait wearing the sash of the Order of Saint Isabel by Francisco Pedro do Amaral, c. 1826
- Born: 27 December 1797; São Paulo, State of Brazil
- Died: 3 November 1867 (aged 69); São Paulo, Empire of Brazil
- Spouses: Felício Pinto Coelho de Mendonça (m. 1813; div. 1824) Rafael Tobias de Aguiar (m. 1842; died 1857)
- Issue: Francisca Pinto Coelho de Mendonça e Castro; Felício Pinto Coelho de Mendonça e Castro; Isabel Maria, Duchess of Goiás; Maria Isabel, Countess of Iguaçu; Rafael Tobias de Aguiar e Castro; João Tobias de Aguiar e Castro; Antônio Francisco de Aguiar e Castro; Brasílico de Aguiar e Castro
- Father: João de Castro Canto e Melo, Viscount of Castro
- Mother: Escolástica Bonifácia de Oliveira Toledo Ribas

Domitila (or Domitília) de Castro do Canto e Melo (Note: Her real name is Dometila de Castro Canto e Mello, but as the spelling is archaic, current historiography prefer to call her Domitila de Castro do Canto e Melo.) (27 December 1797 — 3 November 1867), 1st Viscountess with designation as a Grandee, then 1st Marchioness of Santos, was a Brazilian noblewoman and the long-term mistress and favorite of Emperor Pedro I.

== Life ==
=== Birth and family ===
Daughter of João de Castro do Canto e Melo, 1st Viscount of Castro, and Escolástica Bonifácia de Toledo Ribas, Viscountess of Castro. Domitila belonged to an aristocratic family from São Paulo. Born on 27 December 1797, she was baptized three months later, on 7 March 1798 in the Church of Nossa Senhora da Assunção (Sé) in São Paulo. According to her baptismal record, her godfather was Ensign José Duarte e Câmara.

The Brigadier João de Castro do Canto e Melo was born in the Terceira Island in the Azores, and died in Rio de Janeiro in 1826. He was the son of João Batista do Canto e Melo and Isabel Ricketts, and descended from Pero Anes do Canto, from Terceira Island. He passed to Portugal, setting up a cadet square at the age of 15 on 1 January 1768, named Standard-Bearer on 17 October 1773. He was 21 when, in 1774, he went to Rio de Janeiro and months later to São Paulo. He was transferred to the Santos Infantry line Regiment, promoted to Ensign in 1775 and to Lieutenant in the same year, to Adjudant in 1778; he was Captain in 1798, Major in the same year, and in 1815 Lieutenant Colonel. Later, after his daughter's love with the emperor, he was made Gentleman of the Imperial Chamber and still received the noble title of Viscount of Castro on 12 October 1825.

Domitila's full siblings were:

- João de Castro do Canto e Melo (March 1786 – 11 September 1853), 2nd Viscount of Castro, Field Marshal and Gentleman of the Imperial Chamber; married with Inocência Laura Vieira de Azambuja, with whom he had issue.
- José de Castro do Canto e Melo (baptized 17 October 1787 – died ca. 1842), Brigadier of the Brazilian Army. Soldier at the age of five on 1 July 1792, Standard-Bearer in 1801, Ensign in 1807, Lieutenant in 1815, Commander of the Cavalry Squad of the Legion of São Paulo and in the Battle of Itupuraí, in the 1816 campaign. Captain in 1818, Sergeant Major of the 2nd Line Cavalry Regiment of Vila de Curitiba, then São Paulo Province, in 1824. Colonel of the Army Staff in 1827. He was licensed for health reasons in 1829. Brigadier retired from the Army. Gentleman of the Imperial Chamber, dismissed in 1842. Knight of the Military Order of Saint Benedict of Aviz in 1824 and was promoted to Commander in the same order in 1827. Officer of the Order of the Southern Cross in 1827; married with his niece Francisca Pinto Coelho de Mendonça e Castro, with whom he had issue.
- Maria de Castro do Canto e Melo (baptized February 1790; died in infancy).
- Pedro de Castro do Canto e Melo (baptized 26 May 1791; died in infancy).
- Maria Benedita de Castro do Canto e Melo (18 December 1792 – 5 March 1857), married to Boaventura Delfim Pereira, Baron of Sorocaba, with whom she had issue; her second son Rodrigo Delfim Pereira, although recognized by her husband, was in fact an illegitimate son of Emperor Pedro I, her sister's lover.
- Ana Cândida de Castro do Canto e Melo (January 1795 – 27 May 1834), married to Carlos Maria de Oliva, Veador of the Imperial Chamber and Colonel of the Army, with whom she had issue.
- Fortunata de Castro do Canto e Melo (baptized 12 January 1797; died in infancy).
- Francisco de Castro do Canto e Melo (5 April 1799 – 21 June 1869), Gentleman of the Imperial Chamber, Major retired of the Army; married firstly with Francisca Leite Penteado and secondly with Lina Pereira de Castro. He had issue from his second marriage.

In addition, Domitila had an older illegitimate half-sister, Matilde Eufrosina de Castro, born from her father's earlier relationship (in fact, betrothal later terminated) with Teresa Braseiro.

=== First Marriage ===
On 13 January 1813, Domitila, at the age of fifteen, married an officer from the second squad of the Corps of Dragons in the city of Vila Rica (now Ouro Preto), Ensign Felício Pinto Coelho de Mendonça (26 February 1790 – 5 November 1833), cited by several historians as a violent man, who beat and raped her, and from whom she divorced on 21 May 1824.

After the wedding in São Paulo, Felício and Domitila left for Vila Rica. Three children were born from the marriage:

| Name | Portrait | Lifespan | Notes |
|---|---|---|---|
| Francisca Pinto Coelho de Mendonça e Castro | | 13 November 1813 – 16 August 1833 | Married on 24 May 1828 with her uncle, Brigadier José de Castro do Canto e Melo, whim whom she one daughter, Escolástica Pinto Coelho de Mendonça e Castro, who married Dr. José Soares de Gouveia. |
| Felício Pinto Coelho de Mendonça e Castro | | 20 November 1816 – 15 July 1879 | Gentleman of the Imperial Chamber, Commander of the Royal Military Order of Our Lord Jesus Christ, Midshipman (1827). He went to study in Paris (at the expense of the Brazilian government), returned to Brazil without satisfying his superiors, and was then released from active duty on 4 May 1838; owner of the Vacaria farm. About his progeny there was contradictory information: while the Genealogia Paulistana reports that he married and had 5 children, historian Sonia Maria Weinmann Collares Moreira mentions that he only had 3 natural children. |
| João Pinto Coelho de Mendonça e Castro | | April 1818 – about 1819 | Died shortly after being baptized on 6 August 1819 because during her pregnancy, Domitila was beaten by her husband, which caused a premature childbirth. |

Due to her husband's mistreatment, Domitila obtained permission from his family in São Paulo to return to her father's home with her children. He arrived back in São Paulo at the end of 1816. Felício managed to transfer his post in the army from Vila Rica to Santos and settled in São Paulo, trying to reconcile with his wife and in 1818 they returned to live together. However, given his drinking and gambling problems, it did not take long for Felício to return with his old behavior, and began the beatings and death threats to his wife. On the morning of 6 March 1819, Felício surprised Domitila next to the Santa Luiza fountain and stabbed her twice, one stab caught in the thigh and the other in the belly. Felício was arrested and taken to Santos, next to his barracks, from where he left for Rio de Janeiro. Domitila spent two months between life and death. When she recovered from her injuries, she had to fight legally against her father-in-law, who wanted to take the couple's children to educate them in the Captaincy of Minas Gerais. Domitila asked for Felício's legal separation but only obtained it five years later, when she was already the Emperor's mistress. Domitila's detractors would accuse her after being assaulted because she betrayed Felício, when in reality, through documentation and witnesses in the divorce process, he had tried to kill her to sell the land that both, with the death of his mother, had jointly inherited in Minas Gerais.

=== Imperial Mistress ===
Domitila met Dom Pedro de Alcântara, Prince-Regent of Brazil days before the Proclamation of the Independence on 29 August 1822. The Prince-Regent was returning from a visit to Santos when he received, on the banks of the Ipiranga Brook, in São Paulo, two missives (one from his wife, Princess Maria Leopoldina of Austria and another from José Bonifácio de Andrada e Silva) that informed him about the decisions of the Portuguese Courts, in which Dom Pedro stopped being Prince-Regent and received orders to return to the continent. Outraged by this "interference with his acts as ruler", and influenced by whose defended the break with the metropolis—especially by José Bonifácio de Andrada—he decided to separate Brazil from the Kingdom of Portugal and the Algarves.

Domitila was not the only lover of Dom Pedro, but she was the most important and the one with whom he had the longest relationship. Before his marriage, the Prince-Regent had been involved with a French ballerina, named Noémi Thierry, with whom he had a son. During his relationship with Domitila he had other parallel ones, such as Adèle Bonpland (wife of French naturalist Aimé Bonpland) and the dressmaker Clemence Saisset (whose husband had a store on Rua do Ouvidor), with whom he had a son. In addition to these liaisons, Domitila's own sister, Maria Benedita de Castro do Canto e Melo, Baroness of Sorocaba, also had a son with Dom Pedro.

In 1823, the now Emperor Pedro I installed Domitila at the Barão de Ubá street (today the Estácio neighborhood) which was her first residence in Rio de Janeiro. One year later, and thanks to the support of her lover, Domitila was able to have her first marriage nullified. In 1826, she received as a gift the "Casa Amarela", as her mansion became known, at number 293 of the current Avenida D. Pedro II, near Quinta da Boa Vista, in São Cristóvão (where the Museum of the First Reign now operates). The Emperor bought the house from Dr. Teodoro Ferreira de Aguiar and ordered a renovation in a neoclassical style to the architect Pierre Joseph Pézerat. The internal mural paintings are the work of Francisco Pedro do Amaral, while the internal and external bas-reliefs by Zéphyrin Ferrez.

Domitila was being elevated by her lover little by little. In 1824 she was created Baroness of Santos; on 4 April 1825 she was appointed Lady-in-waiting of Empress Maria Leopoldina, on 12 October of the same year was created Viscountess of Santos with designation as a Grandee and, on 12 October 1826 she was finally created Marchioness of Santos. Besides all this titles, on 4 April 1827 the Emperor invested his mistress with the Order of Saint Isabel, who was solely granted "to women of irreproachable conduct". Although Domitila was not born in that city, the Emperor, in an attempt to attack de Andrada brothers, born in Santos, would have given the titles to his mistress. José Bonifácio de Andrada, upon learning of this fact in his exile in France, wrote to his friend Counselor Drummond: "Who would dream that the michela (prostitute) Domitila would be Viscountess of the homeland of the Andradas! What a brazen insult!". Domitila's family also received several imperial benefits: Her father became Viscount of Castro, her brother Francisco became the Emperor's Field Assistant and the rest of her siblings received Hidalgo precedence. Domitila's brother-in-law, Boaventura Delfim Pereira (husband of Maria Benedita), was made Baron of Sorocaba.

From her relationship with Emperor Pedro I, Domitila had five children:

| Name | Portrait | Lifespan | Notes |
|---|---|---|---|
| Unnamed son | | 1823 | Stillborn. (Note: There is a rumor that the boy was given to a priest known by Domitila's family, since at the time she was still married to Felício Pinto and the Empire of Brazil was still in conflict due to its recent independence. In an interview, biographer Paulo Rezzutti says he received the information from a diary belonging to a woman named Teodora, in which she reported that her great-grandfather was the first son of the Marchioness with the Emperor and tells about the family. However, there is no proven evidence regarding this information.) |
| Isabel Maria de Alcântara Brasileira | Black and white copy of a painted portrait showing the head and shoulders of a woman with dark, curled hair, large eyes and wearing a circlet of flowers and veil on her head | 23 May 1824 – 3 November 1898 | She was the only child of Pedro I born out of wedlock who was officially legitimized by him. On 24 May 1826, Isabel Maria was given the title of "Duchess of Goiás", the style of Highness and the right to use the honorific "Dona" (Lady). She was the first person to hold the rank of duke in the Empire of Brazil. These honors did not confer on her the status of Brazilian princess or place her in the line of succession. In his will, Pedro I gave her a share of his estate. She later lost her Brazilian title and honors upon her 17 April 1843 marriage to a foreigner, Ernst Fischler von Treuberg, Count of Treuberg. |
| Pedro de Alcântara Brasileiro | | 7 December 1825 – 27 December 1825 | Pedro I seems to have considered giving him the title of "Duke of São Paulo", which was never realized due to the child's early death. |
| Maria Isabel de Alcântara Brasileira | | 13 August 1827 – 25 October 1828 | Pedro I considered giving her the title of "Duchess of Ceará", the style of Highness and the right to use the honorific "Dona" (Lady). This was never put into effect due to her early death. Nonetheless, it is quite common to see many sources calling her "Duchess of Ceará", even though "there is no record of the registry of her title in official books, which is also not mentioned in papers related to her funeral". |
| Maria Isabel de Alcântara Brasileira | Black and white photograph showing the head and shoulders of a woman with dark hair wearing a dress with a large, white collar | 28 February 1830 – 13 September 1896 | Countess of Iguaçu through marriage in 1848 to Pedro Caldeira Brant, son of Felisberto Caldeira Brant, Marquis of Barbacena. She was never given any titles by her father due to his marriage to Amélie of Leuchtenberg. However, Pedro I acknowledged her as his daughter in his will, but gave her no share of his estate, except for a request that his widow aid in her education and upbringing. |

Empress Maria Leopoldina died in 1826 due to complications caused by a miscarriage, amidst rumours who blame Domitila of the illness and death of the beloved Empress. The Marchioness of Santos' popularity, which was no longer the best, worsened, with her house in São Cristóvão being stoned and her brother-in-law, a butler of the Empress, received two shots. Her right to preside over medical appointments of the Empress, as her lady-in-waiting, was denied, and ministers and officials of the palace suggested that she should not continue to attend court.

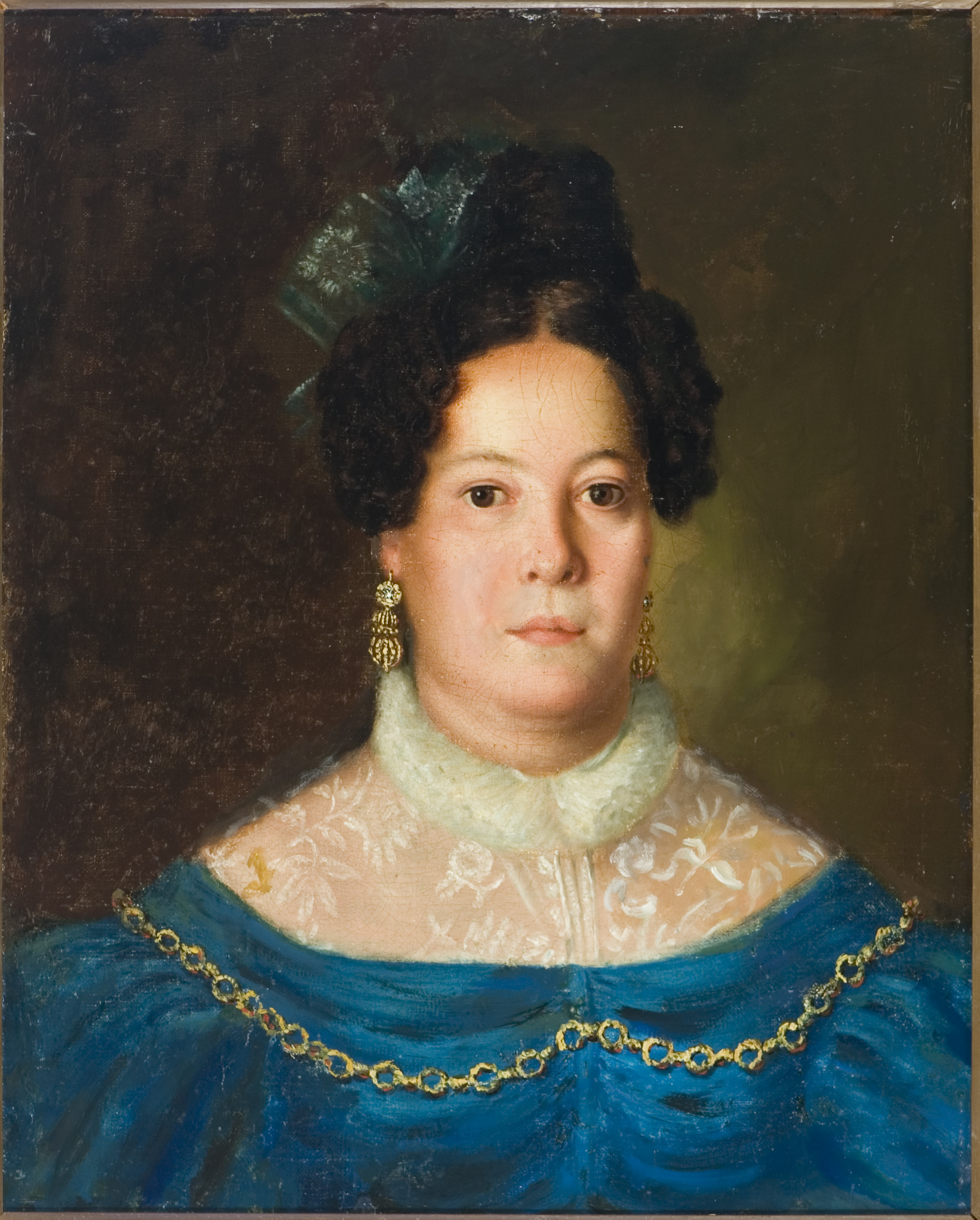
The Marchioness of Santos at the end of the 1820s.

Emperor Pedro I ended his relationship with Domitila in 1829 due to his second marriage with Amélie of Leuchtenberg. Already since 1827 he had been looking for a noble blood bride but the sufferings caused to his late wife by him and the scandalous link with the Marchioness of Santos were seen with horror by European courts and several princesses refused to marry the Emperor.

The Austrian ambassador to Rio de Janeiro, Baron Wenzel Philipp von Mareschal, wrote to Vienna about the future marriage of the Emperor and the banishment of the mistress: "Emperor D. Pedro was eventually convinced that the presence of the Lady of Santos would always be inopportune and that a simple change of residence would not satisfy anyone; he insisted on the sale of her properties, the which I heard was already provided and on her departure to São Paulo in eight or ten days".

The Emperor bought the properties of the Marchioness of Santos in Rio de Janeiro for 240 contos (240 insurance policy of the Public Debt from the Amortization Box, of 1 contos de réis), returning to Domitila "in banknotes of São Paulo" of the amount of 14 contos de réis, two contos for the Amortization Box with which she had presented it, an allowance of 1 conto de réis per month put at your order, "at par or in banknotes". Regarding the residence bought from the former mistress, Mareschal says: "It will serve the young Queen and her court". It was Dona Maria da Glória, future Queen Maria II of Portugal; that is why it would later be known as the Queen's Palace, as effectively Dona Maria da Glória settled there, albeit for a short period. Later was bought by the Viscount of Mauá and around 1900 the residence was acquired by the doctor Abel Parente, the protagonist of one of the biggest scandals in Rio de Janeiro, in 1910. It became the Museum of the First Reign in the late 1980s until 2011 when it was deactivated and the restoration and adaptation of the space began to receive the Fashion Museum - Casa da Marquesa de Santos.

=== Second Marriage ===
Since 1833, Domitila had lived with the Brigadier Rafael Tobias de Aguiar (4 October 1794 – 7 October 1857), whom she officially married in the city of Sorocaba on 14 June 1842. Rafael Tobias de Aguiar was not only a politician, but also a wealthy Sorocaban farmer: the base of his fortune was the trade in mules, but in time he ended up diversifying his business with sugar farms, cattle and horse breeding. The Tobian coat was created by him. Nicknamed the "Reizinho de São Paulo" (Little King of São Paulo) thanks to his fortune, he held the position of President of the Province of São Paulo for two terms and was elected Provincial Deputy for São Paulo. He ran twice for the position of Senator of the Empire, but his name was never chosen by Emperor Pedro II of Brazil. In 1842, as one of the main leaders of the Liberal Revolution, after his marriage to the Marchioness of Santos and the eminent invasion of Sorocaba by the troops of Luís Alves de Lima e Silva, he fled to the south where he was captured. Taken to Rio de Janeiro, he was incarcerated in the Fortress of Laje, located on a rock in the middle of Guanabara Bay. Domitila, on hearing of his arrest, arrived to the Imperial court where, by means of a representative, she pleaded to the Emperor that she could live with her husband in the Fortress of Laje to take care of his health, which was granted.

In 1844, Rafael Tobias de Aguiar was given an amnesty and the couple returned to São Paulo, where they were received with a great party. Rafael Tobias de Aguiar died on board the Vapor Piratininga on 7 October 1857 on his way to Rio de Janeiro in search of medical help. He was accompanied by his wife and one of the couple's children. Domitila's relationship with Rafael Tobias de Aguiar was the longest of her life, lasting 24 years, during which the couple had six children, of which 4 managed to reach adulthood:

| Name | Portrait | Lifespan | Notes |
|---|---|---|---|
| Rafael Tobias de Aguiar e Castro | | 21 May 1834 – 31 October 1891 | Bachelor of law in 1857. Married on 9 January 1858 with his 1st cousin once removed Anna Cândida de Oliva Gomes (granddaughter of Ana Cândida de Castro do Canto e Melo, Domitilia's sister), with whom he had issue. |
| João Tobias de Aguiar e Castro | | 17 June 1835 – 28 October 1901 | Married in 1858 with his first cousin Anna Barros de Aguiar, with whom he had issue. |
| Gertrudes de Aguiar e Castro | | June 1837 – 20 April 1841 | Died in infancy. |
| Antônio Francisco de Aguiar e Castro | | 26 June 1838 – 12 July 1905 | Married in 1858 with Placidina Adélia de Brito, with whom he had issue. |
| Brasílico de Aguiar e Castro | | 4 August 1840 – 22 February 1891 | Married in 1859 with Julia Augusta de Vasconcelos Tavares, with whom he had issue. |
| Heitor de Aguiar e Castro | | 1842 – 1846 | Died in infancy. |

=== The Solar da Marquesa de Santos ===
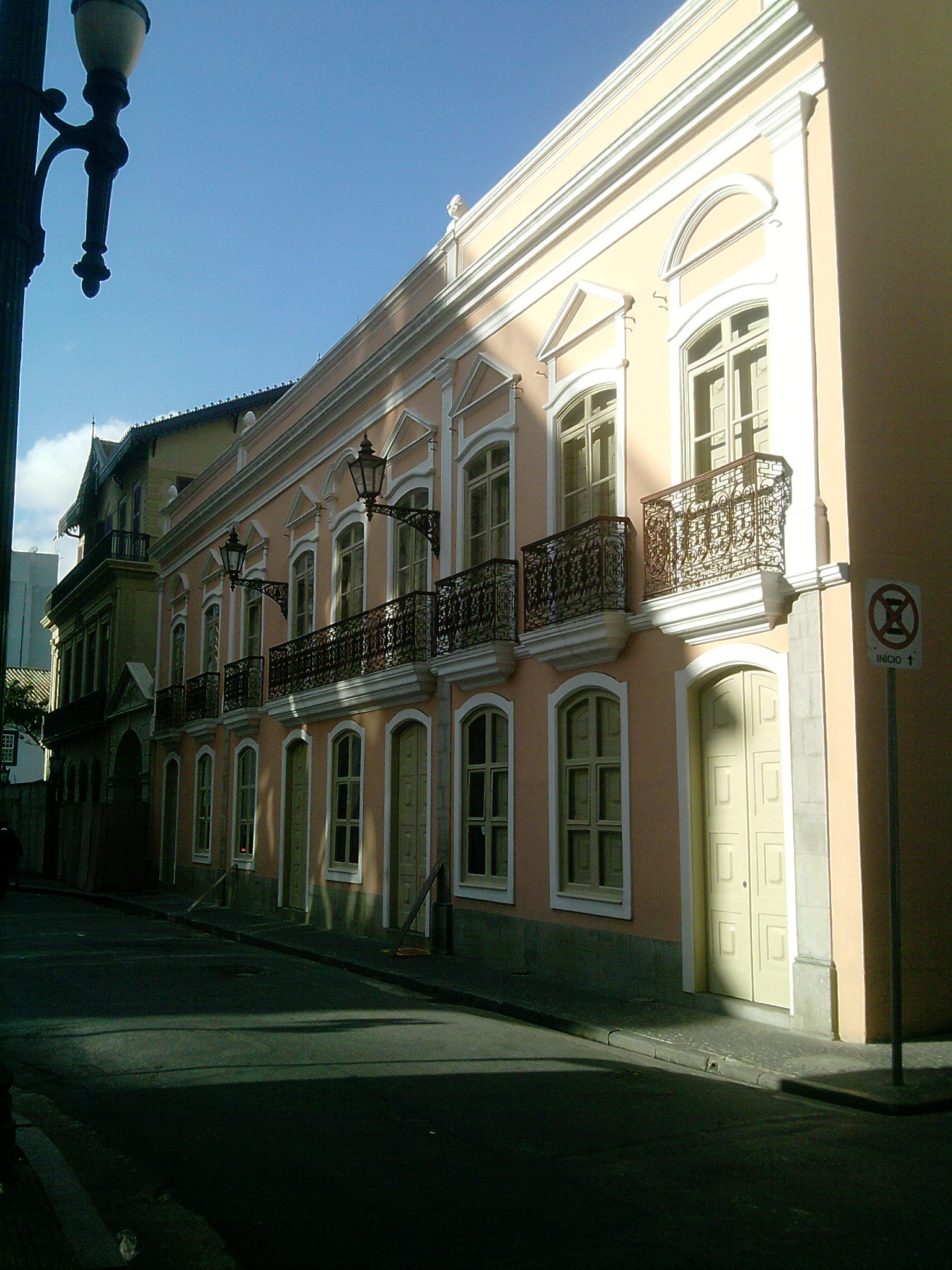
The Solar da Marquesa de Santos, Domitila's residence from 1834 until her death in 1867.

On her return to São Paulo after the end of her relationship with Emperor Pedro I of Brazil, Domitila acquired in 1834 a vast mansion on the old Rua do Carmo, currently Rua Roberto Simonsen in the city center. The first owner of the property was Brigadier José Pinto de Morais Leme according to documentation from 1802. Previously, on the site, there were two houses that were renovated and gave rise to a single building. Domitila was the owner of these house from 1834 until her death in 1867.

The property became the center of São Paulo society, animated by masquerade balls and literary evening parties given by the Marchioness of Santos. In 1880, the house was put up for auction and was acquired by the local Diocese, who transformed the Manor into the Episcopal Palace. The House today belongs to the City Hall of São Paulo, which has the Museum of the City installed there. Its historical importance is great not only because his link to Domitila but because the property is the only urban remnant built using the technique known as rammed earth still existing in the historic center of the city.

=== Later years and death ===
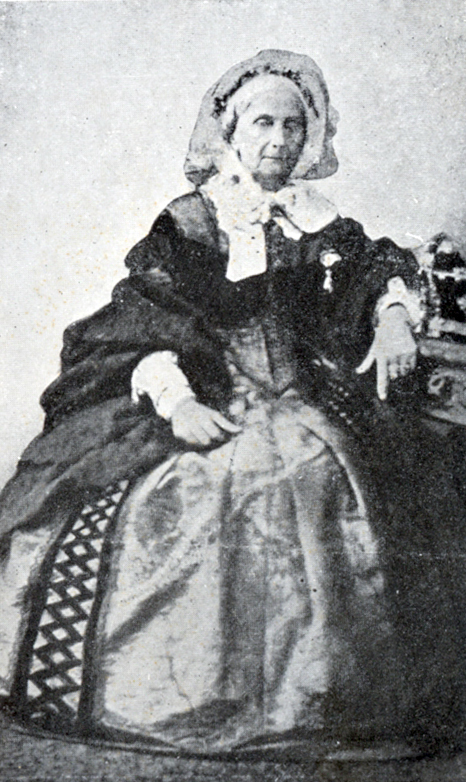
Domitila de Castro aged 68, c. 1865.

After being widowed, the Marchioness of Santos became devout and charitable, seeking to help the helpless, protecting the miserable and hungry, caring for the sick and students of the Faculdade de Direito do Largo de São Francisco, in the center of the city of São Paulo.

Domitila de Castro do Canto e Melo, Marchioness of Santos died of enterocolitis in her residence in the Rua do Carmo, now Roberto Simonsen, near the Pátio do Colégio, on 3 November 1867 aged 69. She was buried in the Cemitério da Consolação, whose original chapel was built with a donation made by Domitila by the amount of 2 contos de réis.

Despite information circulating that the cemetery's land was donated by the Marchioness of Santos, this version is incorrect. In fact, the cemetery was built, partly on land in the public domain and partly on land acquired from Marciano Pires de Oliveira for 200, 000 réis, which donated another part. After the inauguration, the area was enlarged with land expropriated by councilor Ramalho and Joaquim Floriano Wanderley.

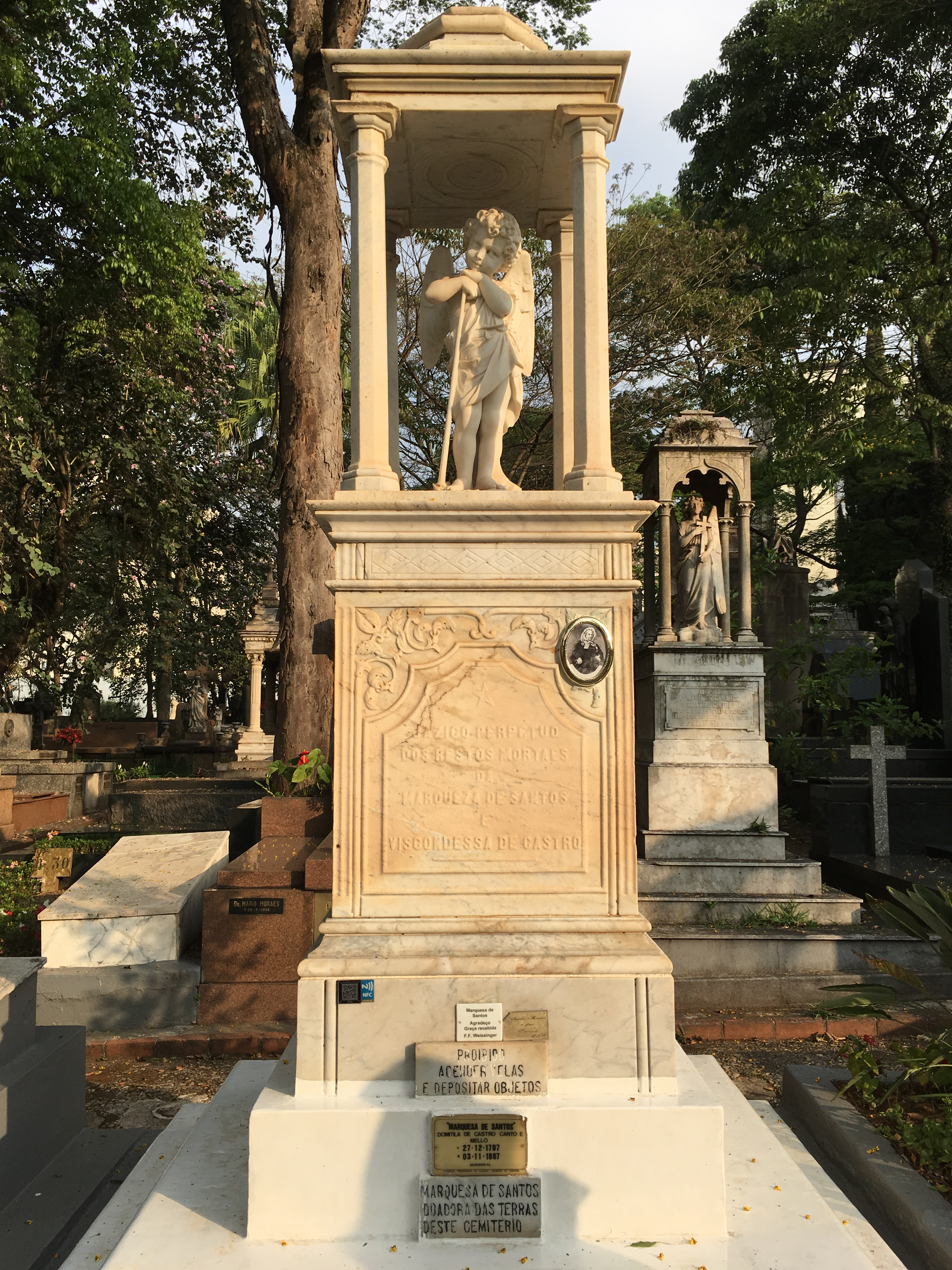
Grave of the Marchioness of Santos at the Cemitério da Consolação in her native São Paulo.

Her grave in the Cemitério da Consolação, as well the two other plots she bought adjoining her gravesite —where her younger brother Francisco de Castro do Canto e Melo, her son Felício Pinto Coelho de Mendonça e Castro, and, after a recent discovery, her daughter the Countess of Iguaçu, were also buried—, were all recovered in the 1980s by the Italian accordionist Mario Zan, one of Domitila's most famous and fervent admirers; he took care of the deposit for the maintenance of the gravesites for years and when he died in 2006 he was buried in a tomb in front of the Marchioness. Even after his death, Mario Zan continues, in a way, to pay for the maintenance of Domitila's gravesite, because according to his will, the copyrights of his music were destined to this purpose.

Domitila's grave always receives fresh flowers from people who continue to consider her a popular saint. Among the legends is that she protects the prostitutes of the city and, due to having achieved a good marriage and restructuring worthily after her scandalous relationship with Emperor Pedro I of Brazil, she became an inspiration for girls who wanted to marry well. In her grave headstone there are plaques from devotees thanking her for some grace.

== Ancestry ==
Ancestors of Domitila de Castro, Marchioness of Santos

8. Jerónimo de Castro do Canto
4. João Batista de Castro do Canto e Melo
9. Úrsula Isabel de Bettencourt de Vasconcelos
2. João de Castro Canto e Melo, 1st Viscount of Castro
10. George Ricketts
5. Isabel Ricketts
11. Sarah Wayte
1. Domitila de Castro, Marchioness of Santos
12. Carlos José Ribas
6. José Bonifácio Ribas
13. Engrácia da Cruz Ferreira
3. Escolástica Bonifácia de Oliveira Toledo Ribas
14. Pedro Álvares da Paz
7. Ana Maria de Toledo e Oliveira
15. Escolástica de Toledo Oliveira

== Representations in culture ==
=== Movies ===
- In the silent film O Grito do Ipiranga (1917), Domitila was portrayed by Luíza Lambertini.
- In the Argentine film Embrujo (1941), with direction and argumentation by Enrique Susini.
- In the film Independência ou Morte (1972), Domitila was portrayed by Glória Menezes.

=== Theater ===
- In Viriato Correia's play A Marquesa de Santos (1938), the Marchioness of Santos was portrayed by Dulcina de Moraes.
- At the revue No Paço da Marquesa (1950), with the Vedette Virgínia Lane in the role of Domitila.
- In the play O Imperador Galante (1954), written by Raimundo Magalhães Júnior, with Domitila being again portrayed by Dulcina de Moraes.
- In the play Um grito de liberdade (1972), by Sérgio Viotti, with actress Nize Silva in the role of Domitila.
- In the play Pedro e Domitila (1984), written by Ênio Gonçalves, Domitila was portrayed by Taya Perez.
- In the monologue Marquesa de Santos: verso & reverso (2019), written by Paulo Rezzutti, Domitila was portrayed by Beth Araújo.

=== Radio ===
- Dramatization of A Marquesa de Santos, by writer Paulo Setúbal by Rádio Nacional Rio de Janeiro, in 1946.
- D. Pedro e a Marquesa de Santos, written by broadcaster Cassiano Gabus Mendes, was aired by Rádio Record, São Paulo, on 7 September 1950.

=== Television ===
- In the televised play A Marquesa de Santos, aired on 12 February 12, 1962 on the program Teatro Nove, on TV Excelsior, Channel 9, São Paulo, the role of the Marchioness was portrayed by Cleyde Yáconis.
- In the soap opera Helena (1987), the Marchioness was portrayed by Norma Suely.
- In the mini-series Marquesa de Santos (1984) on Rede Manchete, the Marchioness was portrayed by Maitê Proença.
- In the miniseries Entre o Amor e a Espada (2001), by TVE Brasil, the Marchioness was portrayed by Rejane Santos.
- In the Rede Globo miniseries O Quinto dos Infernos (2002), the role of the Marchioness was portrayed by Luana Piovani.
- In Rede Globo's soap opera Novo Mundo (2017), the role of the Marchioness was portrayed by Agatha Moreira.

=== Opera ===
- Marquesa de Santos (1948), composed by João Batista de Siqueira. Opera piece in three acts with libretto by Joaquim Ribeiro.
- Chalaça (1973), by conductor Francisco Mignone.
- Domitila (2000), with music and libretto by Rio de Janeiro composer João Guilherme Ripper, inspired by the love letters exchanged between Dom Pedro I and Domitila. The soprano Maíra Lauter portrayed Domitila.

=== Rock ===
- The album "Caso Real" (2015) by the rock band Lítera that was inspired by the love affair between the Emperor Pedro I of Brazil and the Marquesa de Santos, through the book "Titília e o Demonão – Cartas Inéditas de Dom Pedro I à Marquesa de Santos", by the writer Paulo Rezzutti.

=== Sambas plots ===
- Os amores célebres do Brasil (1966), from Acadêmicos do Salgueiro.
- A Favorita do Imperador (1964), from Imperatriz Leopoldinense.
- A flecha do cupido me pegou (1981), from Caprichosos de Pilares.
- Mulheres que Brilham – a força feminina no progresso social e cultural do país (2012), from Vai-Vai.
- Paixões proibidas e outros amores (2014), from Nenê de Vila Matilde.

== Bibliography ==
- Gomes, Laurentino (2010). 1822 – Como um homem sábio, uma princesa triste e um escocês louco por dinheiro ajudaram dom Pedro a criar o Brasil - um país que tinha tudo para dar errado (in Portuguese). Globo Livros.
- Lira, Heitor (1977). História de Dom Pedro II (1825–1891): Ascenção (1825–1870) (in Portuguese). Vol. 1. Belo Horizonte: Itatiaia.
- Rangel, Alberto (1928). Dom Pedro Primeiro e a Marquesa de Santos (in Portuguese) (2 ed.). Tours, Indre-et-Loire: Arrault.
- Rangel, Alberto; Araújo, Emanuel (1984). Cartas de D. Pedro I à marquesa de Santos (in Portuguese). São Paulo: Editora Nova Fronteira.
- Rezzutti, Paulo (2011). Titília e o Demonão. Cartas inéditas de D. Pedro I à marquesa de Santos (in Portuguese). São Paulo: Geração Editorial.
- Rezzutti, Paulo (2013). Domitila. A verdadeira história da marquesa de Santos (in Portuguese). São Paulo: Geração Editorial. ISBN 978-8581300894.
- Rezzutti, Paulo (2017b). D. Leopoldina: a história não contada: A mulher que arquitetou a independência do Brasil (in Portuguese). Leya; 1ª edição. ISBN 978-8544105108.
- Rodrigues, José Honório (1975). Independência: revolução e contra-revolução (in Portuguese). Vol. 4. Rio de Janeiro: Livraria Francisco Alves Editora.
- Silva, Demosthenes de Oliveira (1975). O Solar da marquesa de Santos (in Portuguese). Rio de Janeiro: Carlos Ribeiro.
- Sousa, Octávio Tarquínio de (1972). A vida de D. Pedro I (in Portuguese). Vol. 2. Rio de Janeiro: José Olímpio.
- Viana, Hélio (1968). Vultos do Império (in Portuguese). São Paulo: Companhia Editora Nacional.
