= Isabel Maria de Alcântara, Duchess of Goiás =

Brazilian noble (1824–1898)

Isabel Maria
- Duchess of Goiás; Countess of Treuberg; Baroness of Holzen
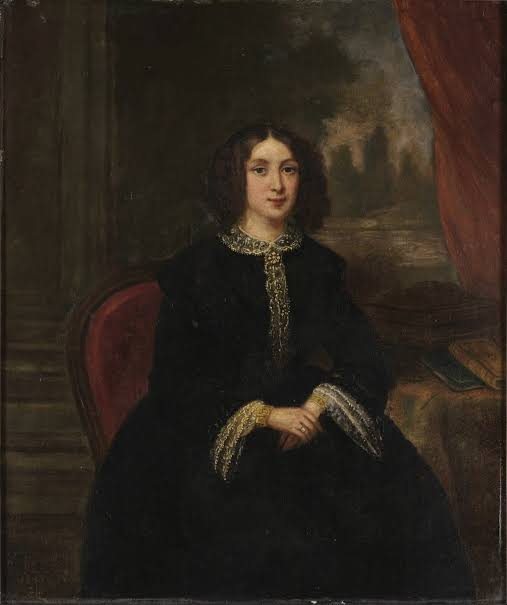
- The Duchess of Goiás, by Wagner, 1853.
- Full name: Isabel Maria de Alcântara Brasileira
- Born: 3 May 1824; Rio de Janeiro, Empire of Brazil
- Died: 3 November 1898 (aged 74); Murnau am Staffelsee, Kingdom of Bavaria
- Spouses: Ernst Joseph Johann Fischler von Treuberg, 2nd Count of Treuberg and Baron of Holzen (m. 1843; died 1867)
- Issue: Marie Amélie Fischler von Treuberg; Ferdinand Fischler von Treuberg; Augusta Maria Fischler von Treuberg; Franz Xavier Fischler von Treuberg
- Father: Pedro I of Brazil
- Mother: Domitila de Castro Canto e Melo

Isabel Maria de Alcântara Brasileira, 1st and only Duchess of Goiás (3 May 1824 – 3 November 1898), was a Brazilian noble, the recognized daughter, born out of wedlock, of Emperor Pedro I of Brazil and Domitila de Castro, Marchioness of Santos, having been baptized on 31 May 1824.

She was legitimized, or recognized as a daughter of the Emperor, on 24 May 1826, by a decree who granted her the noble title of Duchess of Goiás and the right to be treated as "Her Highness, The Duchess of Goiás", treatment that would be unexpected and even irregular by Iberian monarchical traditions. Thanks to this, an order was sent to the headquarters of the Armed Forces of Brazil to salute the girl. She was thus, in practice, treated as a Brazilian princess (although these honors did not confer on her any place in the line of succession) and was considered in the First Reign of the Empire of Brazil a kind of protector of the province of Goiás.

== Life ==
=== Birth and baptism ===
Isabel Maria was born in the city of Rio de Janeiro on 3 May 1824 and was registered as the daughter of unknown parents who would have been abandoned at the home of Colonel João de Castro (in fact, her maternal grandfather). In this condition, she was baptized twenty-eight days later, on 31 May, in the church of São Francisco Xavier do Engenho Velho, having as her godparents the parents of the Marchioness of Santos. Just before her two-year birthday, Emperor Pedro I publicly acknowledged his paternity (being the only one among his illegitimate offspring who was officially legitimized by him) and demanded that the alteration of the child's baptism seat to prove it. (Note: The alteration in the baptism seat was initially rejected by José Caetano da Silva Coutinho, Bishop of Rio de Janeiro and Major Chaplain of the Royal Chapel, which generated friction with the Emperor. The sovereign's demand was only met on 28 May 1826, after the declaration of paternity was sent to the church of São Francisco Xavier do Engenho Velho. Thus, the following note was included in the baptism seat: "I certify that on the 28th of the current month of May of the year 1826, arrived at the house of my residence, next to the diocese of São Francisco Xavier do Engenho Velho, the junior Graduate Officer of the Secretariat of Business in the Empire, Commander Francisco Gomes da Silva, telling me that His Majesty, the Emperor, ordered me to make a note on the seat of the baptism of the innocent Isabel, who was baptized in this diocese, on 31 May 1824, declaring to me together that the same Mighty Lord RECOGNIZED for his daughter the same mentioned innocent, the Lady Isabel Maria de Alcântara, and soon handed me a certificate in which she justified this, made by a Minister of State and signed by others immediately declared below and they were: the Viscount of Inhambupe, Minister of Foreigners; the Baron of Lages, Minister of War; the Viscount of São Leopoldo, Minister of the Empire. As a consequence, therefore, of the aforementioned order of His Majesty, the Emperor, and summoned by the aforementioned Commander Francisco Gomes da Silva, and of the said certificate, I proceeded to reform the seat in question, which I all affirm in fide Parochi. The Vig. MJ Roiz Dantas".)

=== Recognition by the Emperor ===
By a decree dated 24 May 1826, Emperor Pedro I of Brazil granted Isabel Maria the title of "Duchess of Goiás", the style of Highness and the right to use the honorific "Dona" (Lady), being the first person to hold the ducal rank in the newly Empire of Brazil. The imperial decree caused a furor in the Brazilian court and the event was celebrated in a party with grand gala pomp, celebrated in the Palace of Caminho Novo, the imposing residence that the Emperor built for his mistress the Marchioness of Santos on the outskirts of the Palace of São Cristóvão, the imperial palace. (Note: The mourning for the death of King John VI of Portugal was slowed down for the event, where ministers and members of the nobility were present. In an attempt to diminish the scandal generated by the recognition of paternity and the granting of the title, secretary Francisco Gomes da Silva published an article in the Diário Fluminense where he cited the example of other monarchs who acted in the same way as the Emperor, like the French monarchs Henry IV and Louis XIV.)

On 6 June 1826 and before the entire court, Isabel Maria was officially introduced to the Empress consort Maria Leopoldina of Austria. From then on, the Duchess of Goiás began to attend the palace daily to be educated along with her paternal half-sisters, the legitimate daughters of the imperial couple.

Following the death of Empress Maria Leopoldina in December 1826, Isabel Maria was taken to live permanently with her father at the Palace of São Cristóvão in August 1827. In 1829 Emperor Pedro I remarried and definitively broke up his relationship with the Marchioness of Santos, who was sent back to the city of São Paulo. The new Empress consort, Amélie of Leuchtenberg, had already made it clear that she would not allow that the illegitimate daughter of her husband would remain in the Palace of São Cristóvão and even before her arrival in Brazil, Isabel Maria had to be transferred to the Palace of Praia Grande, the official imperial summer residence, in the city of Niterói, located in the province of Rio de Janeiro.

=== Studies in Europe ===
Emperor Pedro I decided to send his legitimized daughter to be educated in Europe; on 25 November 1829, 5-years-old Isabel Maria embarked to France, taking a letter from secretary Francisco Gomes to the Viscount of Pedra Branca with the recommendation that her academical instruction should be "the best possible to make a nun, with the least possible expense, without however lacking the decency due to a daughter His Imperial Majesty, since she is a bastard". The voyage had numerous mishaps: a storm damaged the sails of the ship, its occupants were affected by an outbreak of fever and the little Duchess of Goiás began to complain of chest pain. In view of this situation, Paulo Martins de Almeida, (Note: Created Viscount of Almeida by Imperial Decree of 14 March 1846 and Viscount with Greatness by Imperial Decree of 24 July 1872.) responsible for the girl, ordered the commander of the ship to change the course to the city of Plymouth, where they landed on 8 February 1830. The cortege settled in London, while the Viscounts of Itabaiana and of Resende sought in the city of Paris one school suitable for the education of Isabel Maria.

Isabel Maria was finally taken to the city of Paris in France, and went on to study in the Ecole du Sacre-Coeur (now Musée Rodin), a boarding school where the daughters of the French Catholic aristocracy were educated. (Note: A few years later, Isabel Maria would have as a colleague in the Ecole du Sacre-Coeur the Countess of Teba, Eugenia de Montijo, future Empress of the French as the wife of Napoleon III.) In Brazil, Emperor Pedro I received monthly medical reports and information on his daughter's development. The nuns responsible for the school reported that the Duchess of Goiás was extremely docile and, with the exception of the piano, had been doing well in all subjects. However, they also reported that it was given to mood swings when forced to study.

On 7 April 1831, Emperor Pedro I abdicated the throne of Brazil and left for Europe with his wife Amélia de Leuchtenberg and his eldest legitimate daughter Queen Maria II of Portugal. Shortly after a few months as a guest of King Louis Philippe I, the former Emperor and now Duke of Braganza acquired a home and Isabel Maria began to spend the weekends with her family. This time, Amélie of Leuchtenberg accepted her and ended up adopting her as a daughter. On January 25, 1832, the Duke of Braganza went to Portugal to retake the throne usurped by his younger brother Miguel, leaving Isabel Maria in the care of his wife and mother-in-law, Princess Augusta of Bavaria, Dowager Duchess of Leuchtenberg. Soon after the constitutional forces conquered Lisbon, the Duke of Braganza sent his brother-in-law, the Marquis of Loulé, to Paris to bring his wife and daughter Queen Maria II for Portuguese territory. The Duchess of Goiás, on that occasion, returned to the boarding school.

The Duke of Braganza died on 24 September 1834 and the task of raise Isabel Maria was assumed by his widow and her mother; in his will, the Duke gave his daughter a share of his estate. The Duchess of Goiás had been separated from the Marchioness of Santos at such a young age that she had no recollection of her biological mother and therefore she had always considered Amélie of Leuchtenberg and Dowager Duchess Augusta of Leuchtenberg as her natural mother and grandmother. In 1839, under the tutelage of the Marquis of Resende, Isabel Maria went to Munich and joined the Royal Institute of Young Women to complete her studies. In 1841, Amélie of Leuchtenberg sent news of her progress to her stepson, Emperor Pedro II: "Everyone is very happy with Isabel Maria at the institute, and my mother wrote that she grows and becomes more beautiful every day".

=== Marriage ===
At that time, Amélie of Leuchtenberg started looking for a suitable husband for her stepdaughter. Although she received a considerable inheritance from her father, Isabel Maria's dowry was provided by her siblings: Emperor Pedro II of Brazil, Queen Maria II of Portugal and by her own stepmother, who personally took care of her wedding trousseau.

In 1842, the Duchess of Braganza informed the Emperor of Brazil that she had arranged for the Duchess of Goiás to marry Ernst Joseph Johann Fischler von Treuberg, 2nd Count of Treuberg and Baron of Holzen, son of Franz Xavier Nicolau Fischler von Treuberg (1775-1835) and his wife Princess Maria Kreszentia of Hohenzollern-Sigmaringen (1766-1844), youngest daughter of Karl Friedrich, Prince of Hohenzollern-Sigmaringen. Thirteen years older than the Brazilian Duchess, the Count was a wealthy landowner and related to the Prussian royal family on his mother's side. In November of that year, Amélie of Leuchtenberg asked Pedro II of Brazil to grant the Imperial Order of the Rose to Isabel Maria's future husband.

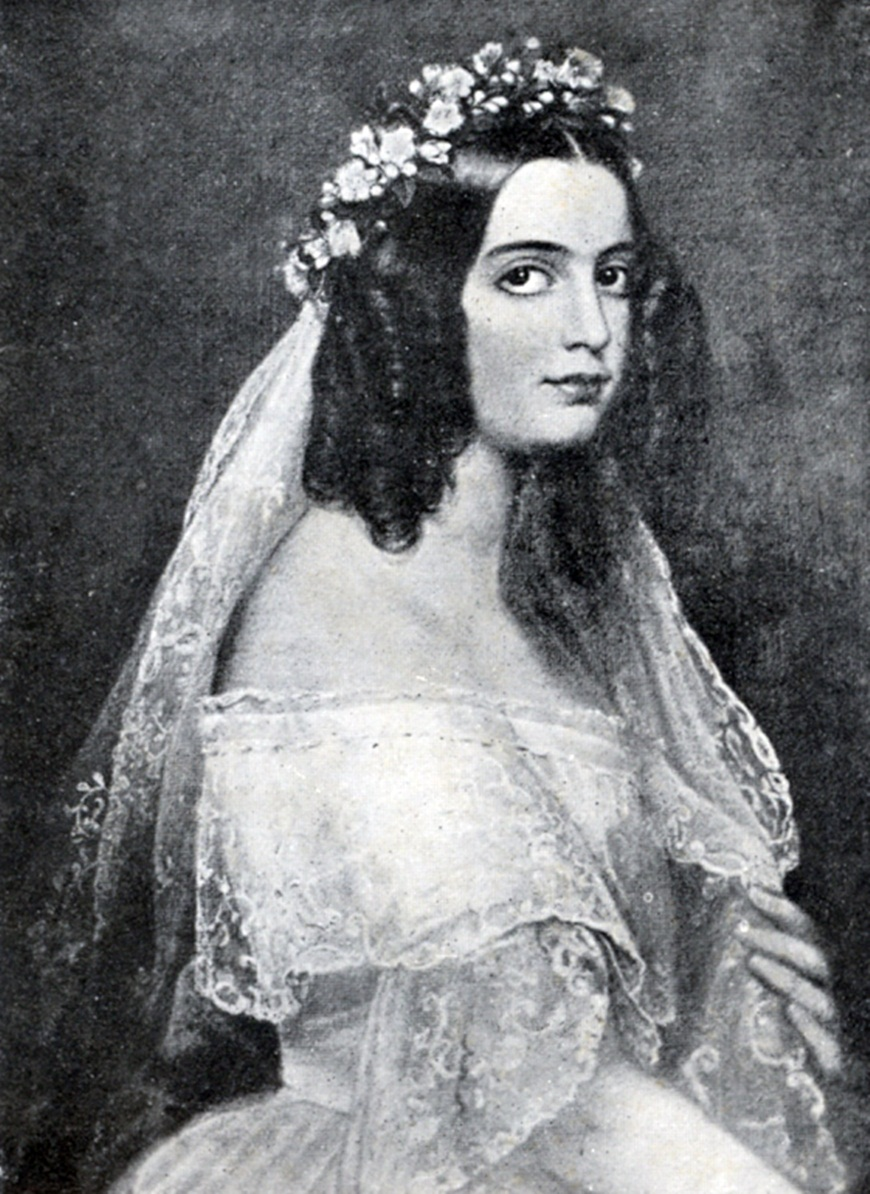
The Duchess of Goiás as a bride, ca. 1843.

The wedding ceremony took place at the Palais Leuchtenberg in Munich on 17 April 1843. Due to her marriage to a foreigner, Isabel Maria lost her Brazilian title and honors. The couple had four children:

- Marie Amélie Fischler von Treuberg (6 February 1844 – 30 March 1919).
- Ferdinand Fischler von Treuberg (24 January 1845 – 3 July 1897), 3rd Count of Treuberg and Baron of Holzen; married Rosine Antonie Therese, Edle von Poschinger. Had issue. He is an ancestor of Prince Rupert Loewenstein (1933–2014), who was the financial manager of the English rock band The Rolling Stones.
- Augusta Maria Fischler von Treuberg (8 October 1846 – 16 August 1909), married Maximilian, Baron Tänzl von Tratzberg.
- Franz Xavier Fischler von Treuberg (2 July 1855 – 1 February 1933), married firstly Karoline von Wendt and secondly to his first wife's sister, Ludovika Manuela Maria von Wendt. Had issue in both marriages.

=== Relationship with the Duchess of Braganza ===
In 1848 and shortly after marrying with Maria Isabel de Alcântara (full-sister of the Duchess of Goiás), Pedro Caldeira Brant, Count of Iguaçu, tried to contact his sister-in-law in Bavaria. Isabel Maria, who had no recollection of her maternal family, was shocked when she received from the Count, as proof of her biological ancestry, the letters exchanged between Emperor Pedro I of Brazil and the Marchioness of Santos in which the lovers mentioned their daughter. The story, which had been hidden from the Duchess of Góias by the express wish of the late former Emperor and Duke of Braganza, ended up initially shaking the family relationship that Isabel Maria had with her stepmother Amélie of Leuchtenberg, whom she considered her mother.

=== Widowhood, later years, and death ===
The 2nd Count of Treuberg died on 14 May 1867, just six months before the death of his mother-in-law, the Marchioness of Santos. Isabel Maria de Alcântara (who remained in Europe and never returned to her homeland), died at Murnau am Staffelsee in the Kingdom of Bavaria, on 3 November 1898, exactly 31 years after her mother's death.

== Titles ==
- 24 May 1826 – 17 April 1843: Her Highness The Duchess of Goiás
- 17 April 1843 – 3 November 1898: The Countess of Treuberg, Baroness of Holzen

== Ancestry ==
Ancestors of Isabel Maria de Alcântara, Duchess of Goiás

8. Peter III of Portugal
4. John VI of Portugal and Brazil
9. Maria I of Portugal and Brazil
2. Pedro I of Brazil and IV of Portugal
10. Charles IV of Spain
5. Carlota Joaquina of Spain
11. Maria Luisa of Parma
1. Isabel Maria de Alcântara Brasileira
12. João Batista de Castro do Canto e Melo
6. João de Castro do Canto e Melo, 1st Viscount of Castro
13. Isabel Ricketts
3. Domitila de Castro, Marchioness of Santos
14. José Bonifácio Ribas
7. Escolástica Bonifácia de Oliveira Toledo Ribas
15. Ana Maria de Toledo e Oliveira

== Bibliography ==
- Lira, Heitor (1977). História de Dom Pedro II (1825–1891): Ascenção (1825–1870) (in Portuguese). Vol. 1. Belo Horizonte: Itatiaia. ISBN 978-8531903571.
- Rangel, Alberto (1928). Dom Pedro Primeiro e a Marquesa de Santos (in Portuguese) (2 ed.). Tours, Indre-et-Loire: Arrault.
- Rezzutti, Paulo (2015). D. Pedro - A história não contada (in Portuguese). São Paulo: LeYa Editora. ISBN 978-85-7734-583-0.
- Rodrigues, José Honório (1975). Independência: revolução e contra-revolução (in Portuguese). Vol. 4. Rio de Janeiro: Livraria Francisco Alves Editora.
- Sousa, Octávio Tarquínio de (1972). A vida de D. Pedro I (in Portuguese). Vol. 2. Rio de Janeiro: José Olímpio.
- Viana, Hélio (1968). Vultos do Império (in Portuguese). São Paulo: Companhia Editora Nacional.
