= Maria Isabel de Alcântara, Countess of Iguaçu =

Maria Isabel de Alcântara
- Countess of Iguaçu
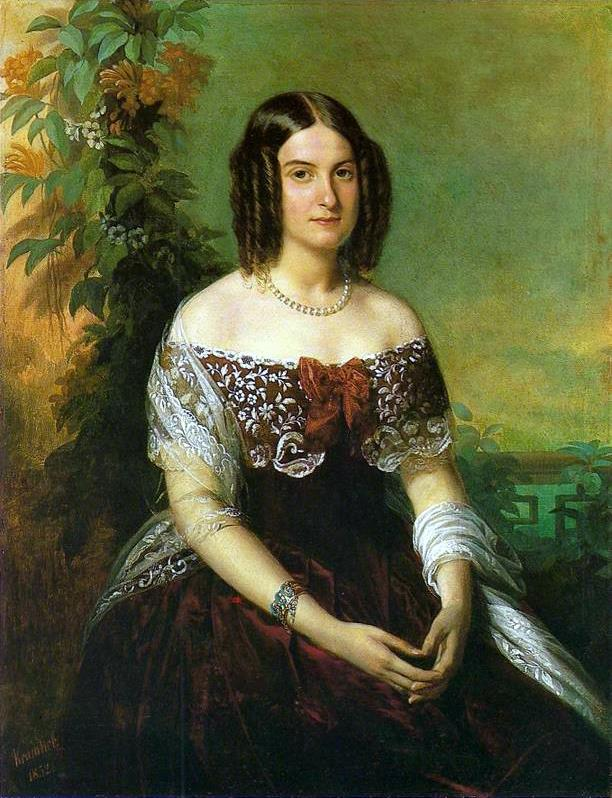
- The Countess of Iguaçu, by Ferdiand Krumholz, c. 1852.
- Full name: Maria Isabel de Alcântara Bourbon
- Born: 28 February 1830; São Paulo, Empire of Brazil
- Died: 6 September 1896 (aged 66); São Paulo, Brazil
- Buried: Consolação Cemetery
- Spouse: Pedro Caldeira Brant, Count of Iguaçu (m. 1848; died 1881)
- Issue: Isabel Caldeira Brant; Pedro de Alcântara Caldeira Brant; Luís de Alcântara Caldeira Brant; Maria Teresa Caldeira Brant; Isabel Maria Caldeira; Brant; Deolinda Caldeira Brant; João Severino de Alcântara
- Father: Pedro I of Brazil
- Mother: Domitila de Castro

Maria Isabel de Alcântara Bourbon (28 February 1830 – 5 September 1896) was the third daughter (fifth child) of Emperor Pedro I of Brazil and his mistress, Domitila de Castro, Marchioness of Santos.

Maria Isabel received the same name as her second sister, the Duchess of Ceará, who died in 1828 at only two months old. Her father never gave her any titles due to his marriage to Amélie of Leuchtenberg. Still, Pedro I acknowledged her as his daughter in his will but gave her no share of his state, except asking for his widow to aid in her education and upbringing. He wished she was given a good European education like her oldest sister, the Duchess of Goiás. However, the Marchioness declined to send the girl to Europe.

== Childhood ==
=== Early life ===
Maria Isabel was born on February 28, 1830, and inherited the same illness as her father, epilepsy. Maria Isabel's childhood was almost always in the shadow of the imperial family.

Even though she was the result of the extramarital affair between her father, Pedro I, and her mother, the Marchioness of Santos, she grew up in the same way as her brothers. The consequences of this relationship only appeared later.

==== Education ====
Her training follows the European model. She was instructed to learn the traditional rules of etiquette like her sisters. Her life was surrounded by dresses and porcelain, and it was a simple and common childhood for members of the Brazilian nobility.

== Lands ==
Everyone knew that Maria Isabel was the result of the relationship outside of marriage between Pedro I and the Marchioness of Santos. Even so, she was raised to become the Countess of Iguaçu, a title she never received. With her emperor father, marquise mother and several heir brothers and half-siblings, she grew up to be part of the nobility. However, due to the adultery of which she was the result, she never received anything from her father, be it title or land.

=== Lands received by Emperor Pedro II ===
She received vast lands from her half-brother Pedro II, among them several pastures and cattle in Juiz de Fora, Ouro Preto, in her districts of Antônio Pereira, Cachoeira do Campo, Lavras Novas and Amaranthine.

In addition to lands in Congonhas, Moeda and Mariana. She lived with her husband Pedro Caldeira Brant, Count of Iguaçu. They lived in the parish, town and city of Nossa Senhora da Piedade do Iguaçu, currently Nova Iguaçu in Engenho de Santo Antônio de Jacutinga. The property (now in ruins), is located at the top of a hill behind Uniabeu, what is today the municipality of Belford Roxo, in Baixada Fluminense.

== Marriage and children ==
=== Marriage ===
On 2 September 1848, at the age of eighteen, Maria Isabel married Pedro Caldeira Brant, the Count of Iguaçu, son of Felisberto Caldeira Brant, Marquis of Barbacena. At their wedding, Maria Isabel became the second Countess of Iguaçu.

=== Children ===
The couple had seven children:

- Isabel dos Santos
- Luís de Alcantâra Caldeira Brant, married Maria Luísa Pereira de Brito
- Pedro de Alcântara Caldeira Brant
- Deulinda dos Santos, married Claudiano dos Santos
- Maria Teresa Caldeira Brant, married Charles Collins
- Isabel Maria dos Santos, married Antônio Dias Paes Leme
- José Severiano de Alcântara

== Death ==
The Countess of Iguaçu died on September 6, 1896 at the age of 66. From that day on, even though Maria Isabel's life was over, a new mystery began.

=== Mystery over burial place ===
Until around 2015, the whereabouts of her body remained a mystery. For up to approximately 120 years, no one was able to locate the place where she was buried. Unlike most of the imperial family, they are easily found in cemeteries.

The Countess used to travel between São Paulo and Rio de Janeiro for much of her life, which raises the question of what state she should be in. Furthermore, many Brazilian nobles were often buried in Europe, such as Germany and Portugal. But historians could not conclude where she was.

Recently, architect and historian Paulo Rezzutti decided to dedicate himself to finding the cemetery where Maria Isabel was buried. He analyzed various obituaries and newspaper stories and recounted the deaths of important people. That's how he discovered "As Raízes da Condessa de Iguaçu" published by O Estado de S. Paulo on September 6, 1896.

From this clue, he found the Civil Registry record of Santa Ifigênia, which reads: “She was buried in the Municipal Cemetery”. She was buried in the Consolação Cemetery. The countess's coffin was next to that of her mother, the Marchioness of Santos. Rezzutti checked the municipal historical archive and found the tombstone. There was no adornment on the tombstone nor her name carved into the stone.

Arms of Maria Isabel, Countess of Iguaçu (by marriage to Pedro Caldeira Brant)

== Titles ==
- February 28, 1830 – September 2, 1848: Miss. Maria Isabel de Alcântara Bourbon
- September 2, 1848 – February 18, 1881: Countess Maria Isabel of Iguaçu

== Bibliography ==
- Lewin, Linda (2003). Surprise Heirs: Illegitimacy, inheritance rights, and public power in the formation of Imperial Brazil, 1822-1889. Stanford University Press. ISBN 0804746060.
- Rangel, Alberto (1928). Dom Pedro Primeiro e a Marquesa de Santos (in Portuguese) (2 ed.). Tours, Indre-et-Loire: Arrault.
- Rangel, Alberto (1984). Cartas de Pedro I à Marquesa de Santos (in Portuguese). Editora Nova Fronteira.
- Viana, Hélio (1968). Vultos do Império (in Portuguese). São Paulo: Companhia Editora Nacional.

== Ancestry ==
Ancestors of Maria Isabel de Alcântara, Countess of Iguaçu

16. John V of Portugal
8. Peter III of Portugal
17. Maria Anna of Austria
4. John VI of Portugal and Brazil
18. Joseph I of Portugal
9. Maria I of Portugal and Brazil
19. Mariana Victoria of Spain
2. Pedro I of Brazil and IV of Portugal
20. Charles III of Spain
10. Charles IV of Spain
21. Maria Amalia of Saxony
5. Carlota Joaquina of Spain
22. Philip, Duke of Parma
11. Maria Luisa of Parma
23. Louise Élisabeth of France
1. Maria Isabel de Alcântara Bourbon
24. Jerónimo de Castro do Canto
12. João Batista de Castro do Canto e Melo
25. Úrsula Isabel de Bettencourt de Vasconcelos
6. João de Castro do Canto e Melo, 1st Viscount of Castro
26. George Ricketts
13. Isabel Ricketts
27. Sarah Wayte
3. Domitila de Castro Canto e Melo, Marchioness of Santos
28. Carlos José Ribas
14. José Bonifácio Ribas
29. Engrácia da Cruz Ferreira
7. Escolástica Bonifácia de Oliveira Toledo Ribas
30. Pedro Álvares da Paz
15. Ana Maria de Toledo e Oliveira
31. Escolástica de Toledo Oliveira
