= Mario Zan =

Italian accordionist based in Brazil

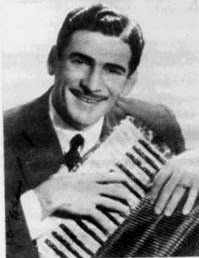
Image of Mario Zan

Mario Giovanni Zandomeneghi (Roncade, October 9, 1920 — São Paulo, November 9, 2006), known as Mario Zan, was an Italian accordionist based in Brazil, famous for composing the hymn commemorating the IV Centenary from São Paulo city and for its typical music from festas juninas in São Paulo.

== Biography ==
Mario Giovanni Zandomeneghi was born in Roncade, Veneto, Treviso province, Italy and, in the 1920s, immigrated with his family to São Paulo. The Zandomeneghi family settled in Santa Adélia, in the region of Catanduva, in the interior of São Paulo, where Mario Zan had as his main supporter his cousin and accordionist Hilário Fossalussa, from the city of Olímpia, also in São Paulo .

Mario Zan started playing accordion at the age of thirteen and was considered one of the best accordionists in Brazil, having become famous for his compositions (more than a thousand recorded), many of them being the most popular songs from São Paulo's festas juninas, such as Quadrilha Completa, Balão Bonito, Noites de Junho and Pula a Fogueira. Mario Zan was also the author of the commemorative hymns of the 400 years and 450 years of city of São Paulo. Zan also composed dubs, being by him the famous Dobrado Silvino Rodrigues. The "King of Baião" Luís Gonzaga once said that Mario Zan was the true "Accordion King".

Two of his songs crossed Brazilian borders: Nova Flor (written in partnership with Palmeira and recorded in English as Love me like a Stranger, in Spanish as Los hombres no deben llorar, in German as Fremde oder Freunde) and the Anthem of the Fourth Centenary of São Paulo, written in partnership with JA Alves.

== Death ==
Mário Zan died after a cardiac arrest in São Paulo. His body was veiled in the and Legislative Assembly of São Paulo buried in the Consolation Cemetery, in front of the tomb where the Marchioness of Santos is buried, as desired by Mário himself, a great admirer of Domitila de Castro Canto e Melo, Marchioness of Santos.
