= Tobias de Aguiar =

Brazilian politician

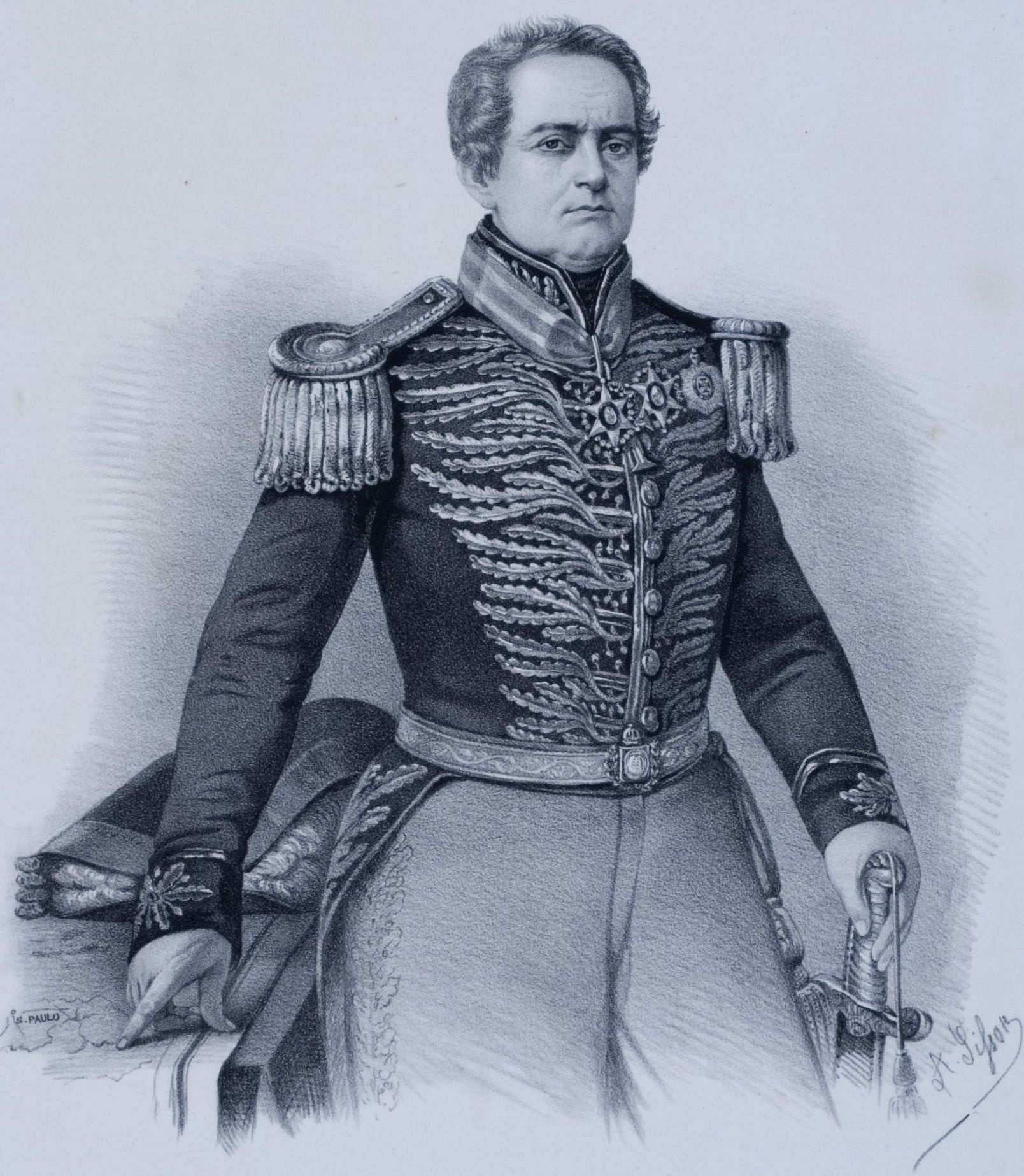
- Born: 4 October 1794; Sorocaba, Brazil
- Died: 7 October 1857 (aged 63) Rio de Janeiro coast, Brazil
- Rank: Brigadier
- Conflicts: Ragamuffin War

Rafael Tobias de Aguiar (4 October 1794 – 7 October 1857) was a Brazilian politician and military officer, from Sorocaba, São Paulo. He was one of The São Paulo Liberal Revolution leaders in 1842.

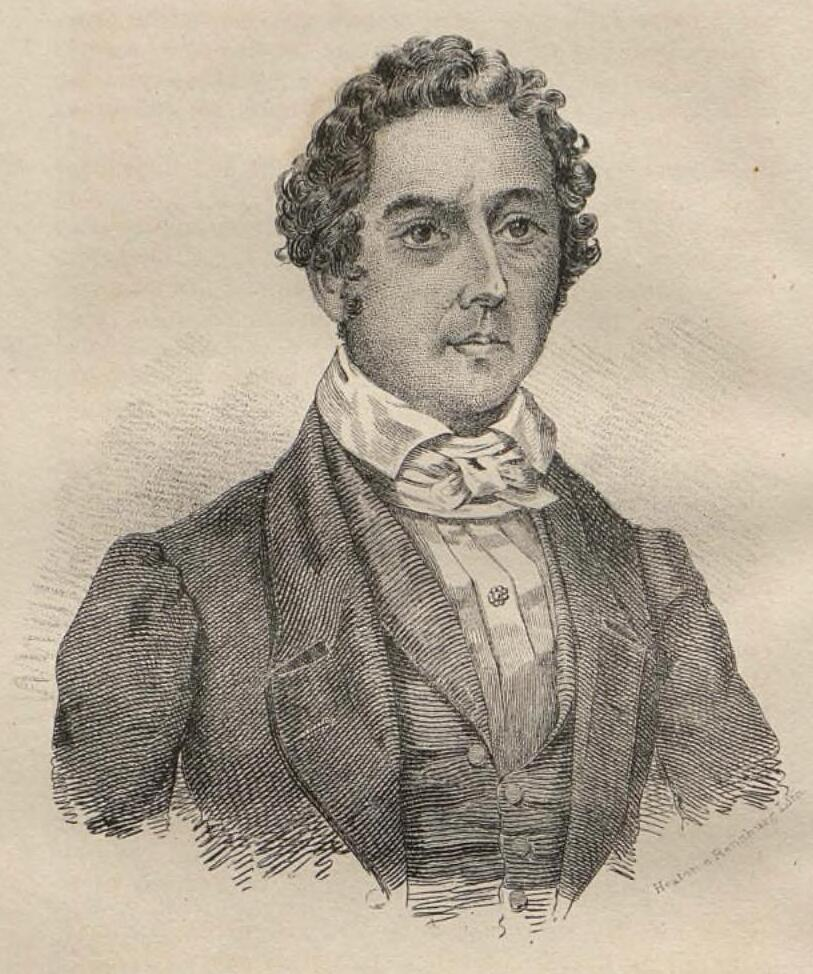
A depiction of young Tobias de Aguiar during the Revolution of 1842, in "História do movimento político que no ano de 1842 teve lugar na Província de Minas Gerais", 1844
