= Rua do Ouvidor =

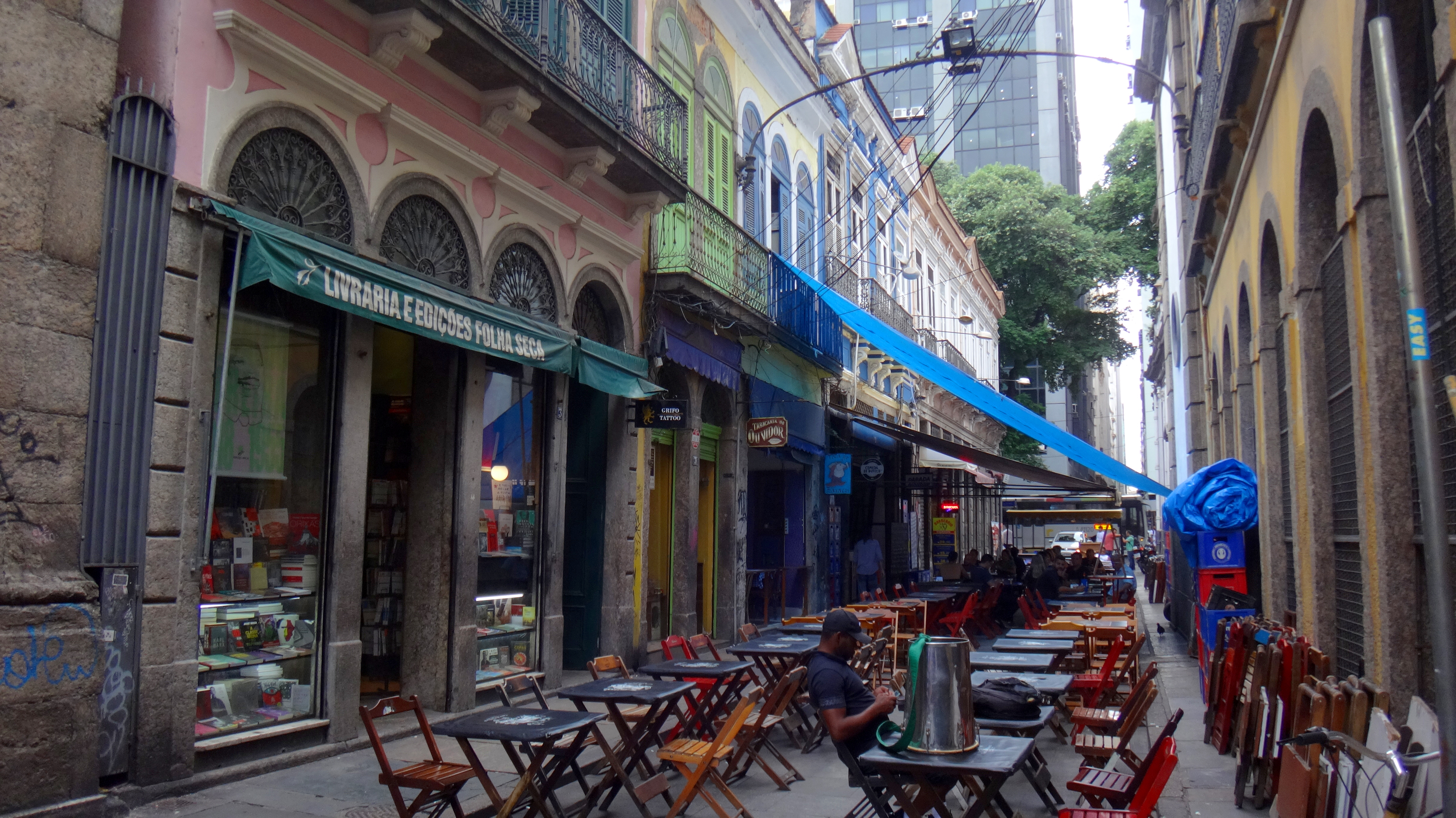
- Former name(s): Rua Desvio do Mar; Rua do Gadelha; Rua de Aleixo Manuel Albernaz; Rua do Barbalho; Rua da Santa Cruz; Rua da Quitanda; Rua de Pedro da Costa; Rua da Sé Nova
- Location: Rio de Janeiro
- From: Largo de São Francisco
- To: Orla Conde

Rua do Ouvidor is a street located in the Centro neighborhood of Rio de Janeiro, Brazil. During the 19th century it was the main commercial hub of the city, housing upscale jewelry stores, boutiques, cafes and newspapers. Nowadays it houses bars, restaurants and bookstores.

== History ==
The thoroughfare already existed during the 16th century, then called Desvio do Mar (Detour to the Sea), a path that provided access to the warehouses or trapiches of the old port of Rio. The street was also called Rua do Gadelha, de Aleixo Manuel Albernaz, do Barbalho, da Santa Cruz, da Quitanda, de Pedro da Costa, and da Sé Nova.

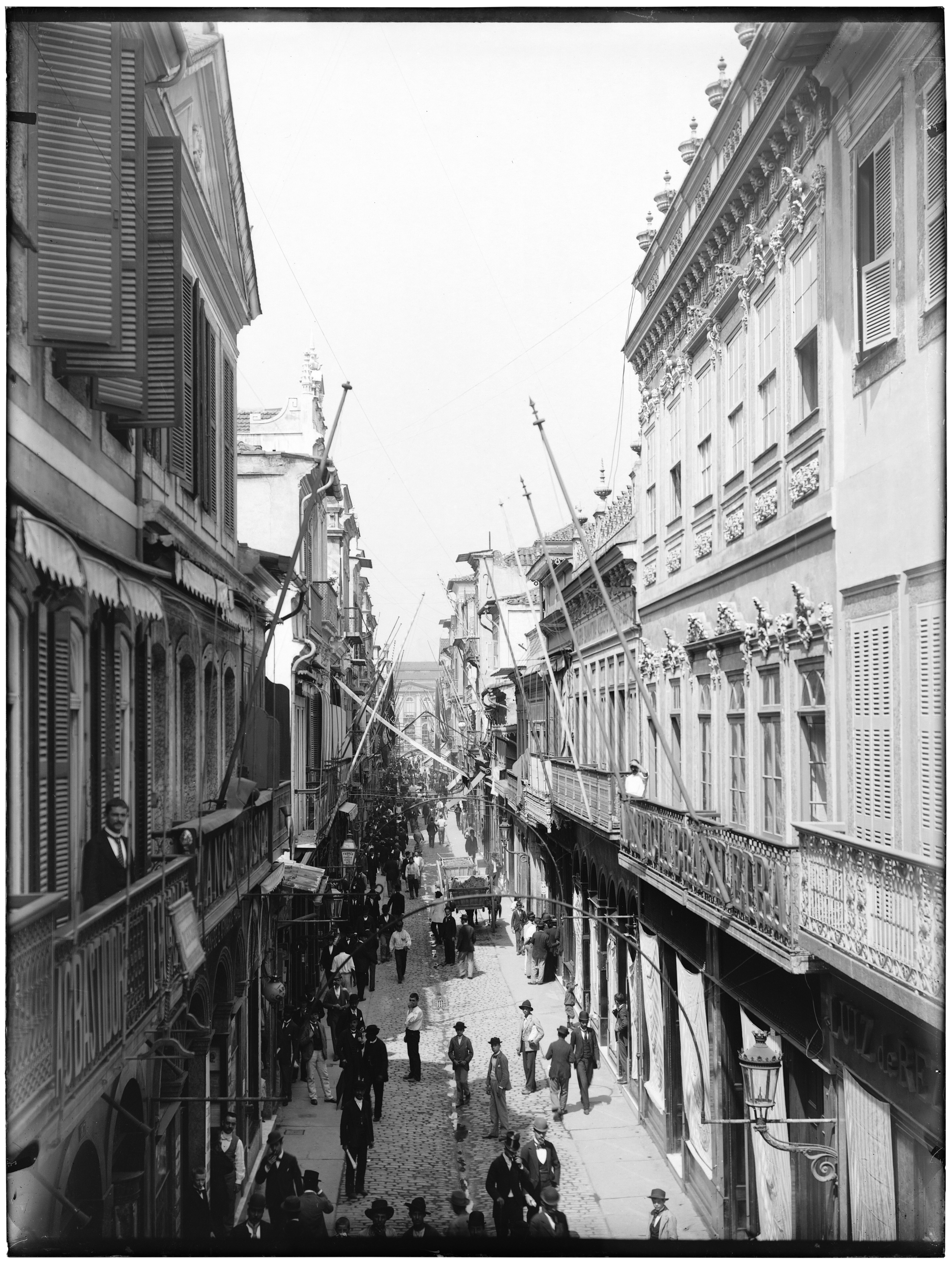
Rua do Ouvidor between circa 1885 and circa 1895. Photography by Marc Ferrez. Instituto Moreira Salles collection

The name Rua do Ouvidor was established around 1780, where the ouvidor (magistrate) Francisco Berquó da Silveira had his house at the time.

During the 19th century, with the transfer of the Portuguese court to Brazil, it was considered the most important street in Rio de Janeiro, home of jewelry stores, parfumists, French-style clothing boutiques and seat of most of the newspapers at the time. Despite its narrowness, it was also one of the main places where the Carnival celebrations were held. Writers such as Joaquim Manuel de Macedo and Machado de Assis wrote about the social life of Rua do Ouvidor; in his Memórias da Rua do Ouvidor, Macedo wrote that the street was "[...] the most popular and crowded street, and also the most frivolous, indiscreet, gossipy, extravagant, vain, polyglot, and encyclopedic of all the streets of Rio de Janeiro."

After 1900, the street lost its place as a main luxury point, with the opening of the wider Avenida Rio Branco.
