= Liberal rebellions of 1842 =

Liberal Rebellions of 1842
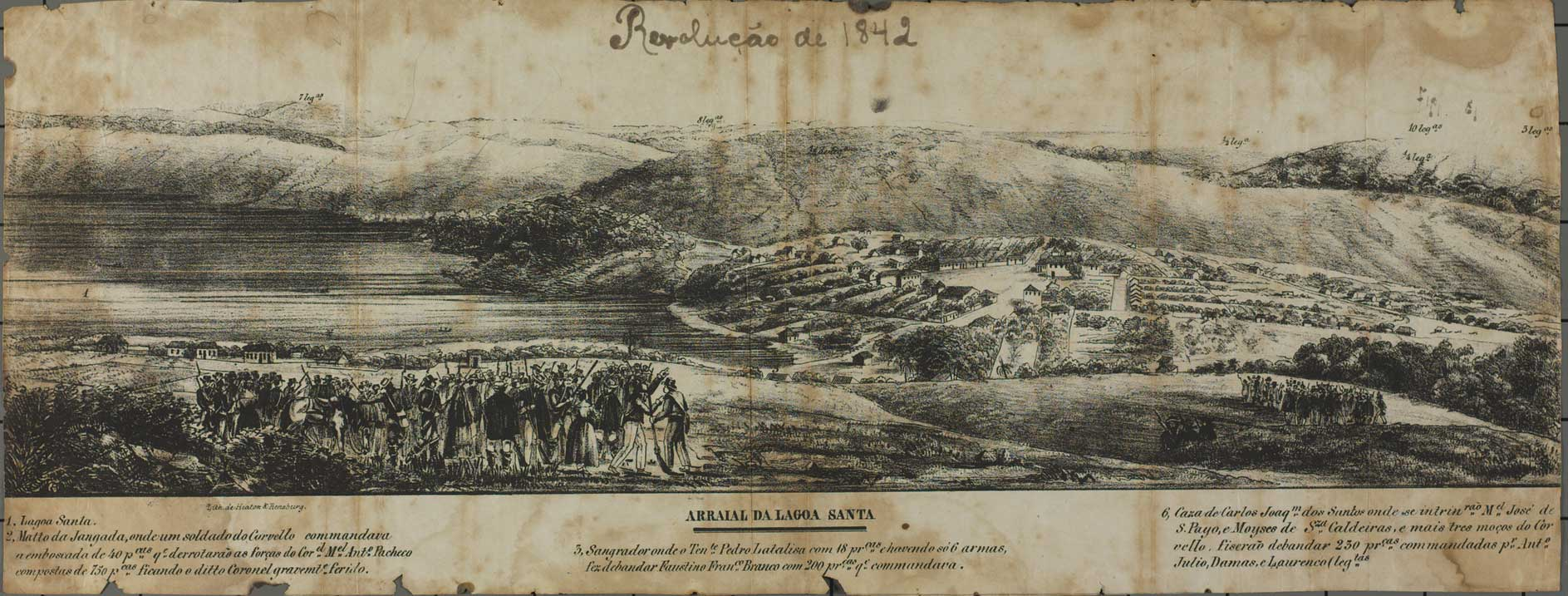
- View of the village of Lagoa Santa during the revolution of 1842
Date	May 1842 – August 1842
Location	Minas Gerais and São Paulo
Result	Central government victory

Belligerents
Empire of Brazil: National Guard	Rebels: Minas Gerais; São Paulo

Commanders and leaders
Bernando J. da Veiga; Lima e Silva	Teófilo Ottoni; José Feliciano; Tobias de Aguiar

The Liberal Rebellions of 1842 were a series of rebellions that took place in the Brazilian provinces (Note: Prior to the 1891 Brazilian Constitution the country's subdivisions were called provinces instead of the current states.) of Minas Gerais and São Paulo in response to actions taken by emperor Dom Pedro II to unify power under the central government and limit the powers of the provinces. These rebellions were poorly coordinated and were put down by the central government to little effect. Along with the rebellions in Rio Grande do Sul, the Liberal Rebellions marked the end of a series of province-level rebellions that threatened the Empire of Brazil's stability.

== Background ==
These rebellions occurred at the height of a long period instability between 1831 and 1840 when the Empire of Brazil was ruled by a regency. The regency was due to Dom Pedro I's decision to abdicate the throne because of the dissolving relations between the Emperor and the assembly, a failed war with Argentina, and a mounting constitutional crisis. Pedro I's decision to abdicate left his five-year-old son Pedro II in charge, requiring the establishment of the regency. In order to avoid mass secession by the individual provinces in Brazil, the regency undertook a massive decentralization process that saw the central government giving more powers to the then provinces of Brazil. However, the provinces seized these new powers and began to rebel. In an effort to prevent the collapse of the Empire of Brazil, the regents handed over power to the 14 year old Pedro II who began to recentralize power in the Empire. Furthermore, the end of the old regency created new powers to Pedro II, for instance the ability to dissolve the Chamber of Deputies and remove and appoint cabinet ministers, powers that gave him more unquestioned authority.

After assuming the throne, Pedro II enacted two laws that undid much of the decentralizing efforts taken by the regency and allowed the central government to assume much more control. The first law reversed the decentralization of the police and gave the power to control them back to the central government, and the second law centralized the justice system. Immediately following the enactment of these laws, Pedro II and the cabinet appointed loyalists as political agents, chiefs of police and judges in the provinces that would soon rebel. These initial actions paired with other centralization efforts deprived the provinces and cities of much of the power and authority they previously had. Since these actions were taken by the conservative government, liberals in the more powerful provinces began to speak of rebellion. The change from the regency to Pedro II's rule represented a change from liberal rule to conservative rule, which also contributed to unrest amongst the liberal elite in São Paulo, Minas Gerais, and Rio de Janeiro.

== Causes ==
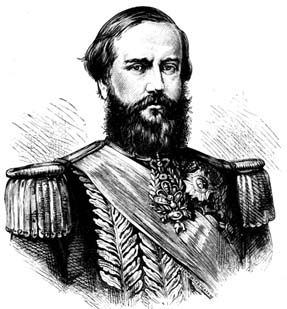
The Emperor at the time of the revolts, Dom Pedro II.

Unrest in the provinces of Maranhão (Balaiada) and Rio Grande do Sul (Ragamuffin War) had not been fully resolved, when, in 1840, the young emperor Pedro II assumed the throne. Francisco de Lima's Liberal Party had pushed through the premature declaration of the Emperor's majority on 23 July 1840.

The Ministry, dominated by conservatives since March 23 of 1841, adopted centralizing measures which resulted in intense agitation from Liberals. These measures reflected the fears among the elites about the potential social dangers that accompanied unrestrained social liberty and what that could cause for the power of the Emperor. The members of the Ministry also feared that Dom Pedro II's efforts would have a negative effect on the economic interests of the larger states. However, there was dissent stirring, for in May 1842 the Liberals would take over the House. In an attempt to minimize the influence of the Liberals in São Paulo, the emperor dismissed Tobias de Aguiar and, after the short tenure of Melo Alvim, appointed José da Costa Carvalho to replace Manuel Marques, since Manuel Marques de Sousa, Count of Porto Alegre was a rich farmer who interacted with the Reactionaries. Pedro also dissolved the Chamber of Deputies, which at that time was dominated by liberals. Pedro's actions were encouraged by members of his cabinet who belonged to the more conservative Party of Order.

The actions taken by the central government to prevent the return to power of the liberals led to rebellion. In May 1842, liberals rebelled in the provinces of Minas Gerais and São Paulo in retaliation for the Emperor's decision — on the advice of a Council of State dominated by reactionaries — to call for new elections, annulling the previous election alleged to have been tainted by widespread fraud by the Liberal Party.

Liberal elites in Minas Gerais, São Paulo, and Rio de Janeiro appointed new provincial presidents and began military resistance. They had expected much more control in Pedro II's new government due to their appointment of many supporters in the Chamber of Deputies. However, they failed to anticipate Pedro II's ability to dissolve the chamber of deputies, which he did, rendering their influence useless. As a result, liberals in Minas Gerais and São Paulo rose up in a spontaneous and armed rebellion, convinced that simply showing armed resistance would be enough to secure their demands.

== The revolt in São Paulo ==
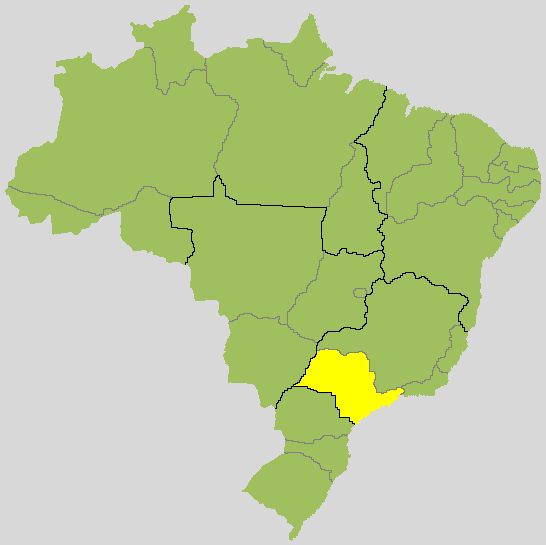
A map of Brazil with São Paulo highlighted

The revolt in São Paulo began on May 17, 1842. This revolt was one of the major events of the liberal rebellions of 1842. The rebellion had two causes: one, it comprised a reaction to the overall shift towards conservatism in the government that Dom Pedro II was leading. Two, and more specific to the state of São Paulo, it was a reaction to new laws that modified and regulated the criminal code, and the newly instituted forced adjournment of the House of Deputies. Furthermore, the government of Dom Pedro II had recently banned the trading of horse and mules with the Southern province of Rio Grande do Sul due to rebel activity in that province. This represented a realization of the liberal elites' fears that the centralization of the new government would damage economic interests, as horse and mule training was an important economic activity in São Paulo; thus, rebellion broke out in Sorocaba, a town closely linked to this trade.

The rebellion established a new leadership to challenge the established leadership in São Paulo. Rafael Tobias de Aguiar, one of the wealthiest merchants in Brazil and a powerful nativist leader, was sworn to "defend the Emperor and the Constitution until the last drop of his blood." He named military commanders, dispatched emissaries, suspended the "law reform" and declared null and void the acts performed under it.

Under his military command, he established the Liberating Column, with some 1,500 men, to march to São Paulo where they would overthrow the President of the Province, José da Costa Carvalho. Sorocaba was declared the provisional capital of the province, and was joined by several inland villages such as Itu, Itapeva, Porto Feliz, Itapetininga and Capivari. However, the rebel forces were quickly opposed by the Rio de Janeiro National Guard and the army.

The president (governor) of the province of Rio de Janeiro, Honório Hermeto, commanded the provincial National Guard, and traveled through the province to organize a response.

He joined forces in Ouro Preto with Luís Alves de Lima e Silva (then-Baron and later Duke of Caxias), who commanded the National Guard of São Paulo and Minas Gerais. Dom Pedro II put Lima e Silva in charge of ending the rebellions in São Paulo because of his status as an effective and heroic military commander and because of his work in 1840 to quell a rebellion taking place in Maranhão which he ended with a decisive victory. The rebel capital of Sorocaba fell to the forces of Hermeto and Silva on June 20 of the same year. On 1 July, he advanced with troops towards Ouro Preto, where, after defeating the rebels, he freed his father and uncle, who the rebels had held captive.

The defeated leaders of the rebellion were captured and then deported to the province of Espírito Santo while their followers and general rebels were pushed into service in the Emperor's army. Response to the defeat of the Emperor's armies was limited. While some bishops attempted religious ceremonies to celebrate their victory, Luís Alves de Lima e Silva, the leader of the victors, argued that the dead should be remembered, but a victory over other Brazilians was not worth celebrating.

== The revolt in Minas Gerais ==
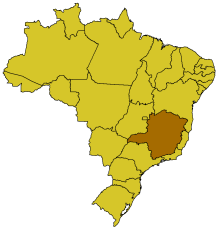
A map of Brazil with Minas Gerais highlighted.

In the Province of Minas Gerais, the revolt broke out June 10, 1842 in Barbacena, which was chosen to host the revolutionary government. José Feliciano Pinto Coelho da Cunha was named as interim president of the Province. On July 4 in Queluz (now Conselheiro Lafaiete), legal forces were beaten by the insurgents commanded by Col. Antonio Nunes Galvão. The rebels received new volunteers, especially from Santa Luzia, Santa Quiteria, Santa Bárbara, Itabira, Caeté and Sabará.

Luís Alves de Lima e Silva, commander of the army, employed the same strategy used in São Paulo, taking the capital as quickly as possible, on August 6, 1842. He was able to narrowly defeat the rebels in August.

The rebels come out winners in Lagoa Santa, under the leadership of Teófilo Ottoni. However Lima e Silva reunited his forces and attacked Santa Luzia, ending the insurgency in the province. The Liberals became known as "luzias" due to the Battle of Santa Luzia.

The defeated, among which were Teófilo Ottoni and Camilo Maria Ferreira Armond (count of Prados), were sent to prison in Ouro Preto and Barbacena.

This rebellion was poorly coordinated with the one that took place São Paulo, as only rebels in Barbacena rebelled, and even the rebels in this city demonstrated a lack of fighting spirit and an uncertainty over the desired outcome which likely contributed to their lack of success.

== End of the Revolt of 1842 ==
The remaining rebels were easily defeated, and by late August, the uprisings had been quelled. Among the rebel leaders was the former regent, Diogo Antônio Feijó, who was arrested. He died shortly afterwards in 1843. As Honório Hermeto returned from Minas Gerais to Rio de Janeiro, he was welcomed with celebrations and demonstrations of joy by the authorities and populace of the districts he traversed.

Much of the failure of the rebellion can be attributed to the lack of coordination among the rebels, their trepidation about disrupting the social order, and their unwillingness to work together in a meaningful way. These shortcomings contributed to a general indecisiveness and hesitation when the rebellions broke out. Another key reason the rebellions were so unsuccessful was that the leaders of the rebellion ascribed to political philosophy that saw rebellion as a symbolic measure to defend the status quo, and not to change it. Therefore, the rebellion was not intended to use military means to overthrow the government or to allow the provinces to secede but to show their displeasure with the actions of the government. They did not intend to overthrow Pedro II as they made clear when they initiated rebellion, but to use rebellion as a way to reassert their rights in government, not change it. Ultimately, the rebels framed rebellion as a means to protect Dom Pedro II by forcing the resignation of the Cabinet Members and overturning of bad policies. This stance likely led to the muted response from the emperor and his cabinet. However, since the idealistic stance that the rebels took clashed with the nature of rebellion and because the rebels were unable to fight a civil war or sustain military action, they resorted to abandoning their principles and fleeing. Therefore, the rebellion was easily squashed. The end of the Liberal Rebellions also marked a significant step in the consolidation of government power in Brazil, moving from a less-centralized system to a full nation state that prioritized the national interest over the local interests. In the international system, Brazil was able to present itself as a nation state.

== Bibliography ==
- MARINHO, José Antônio. História do Movimento Político (...) de Minas Gerais. Rio de Janeiro: 1844.
- O combate de Venda Grande
- História da Polícia Militar do Districto Federal - Vol I (1809-1889) editora da Polícia Militar, Rio de Janeiro, 1925
- Ribeiro, João. Historia do Brasil:1901
- Barman, Roderick J. (1999). Citizen Emperor: Pedro II and the Making of Brazil, 1825–1891. Stanford, California: Stanford University Press. ISBN 978-0-8047-3510-0.
- Needell, Jeffrey D. (2006). The Party of Order: the Conservatives, the State, and Slavery in the Brazilian Monarchy, 1831–1871. Stanford, California: Stanford University Press. ISBN 978-0-8047-5369-2.
