= Cemitério da Consolação =

Cemetery in São Paulo, Brazil

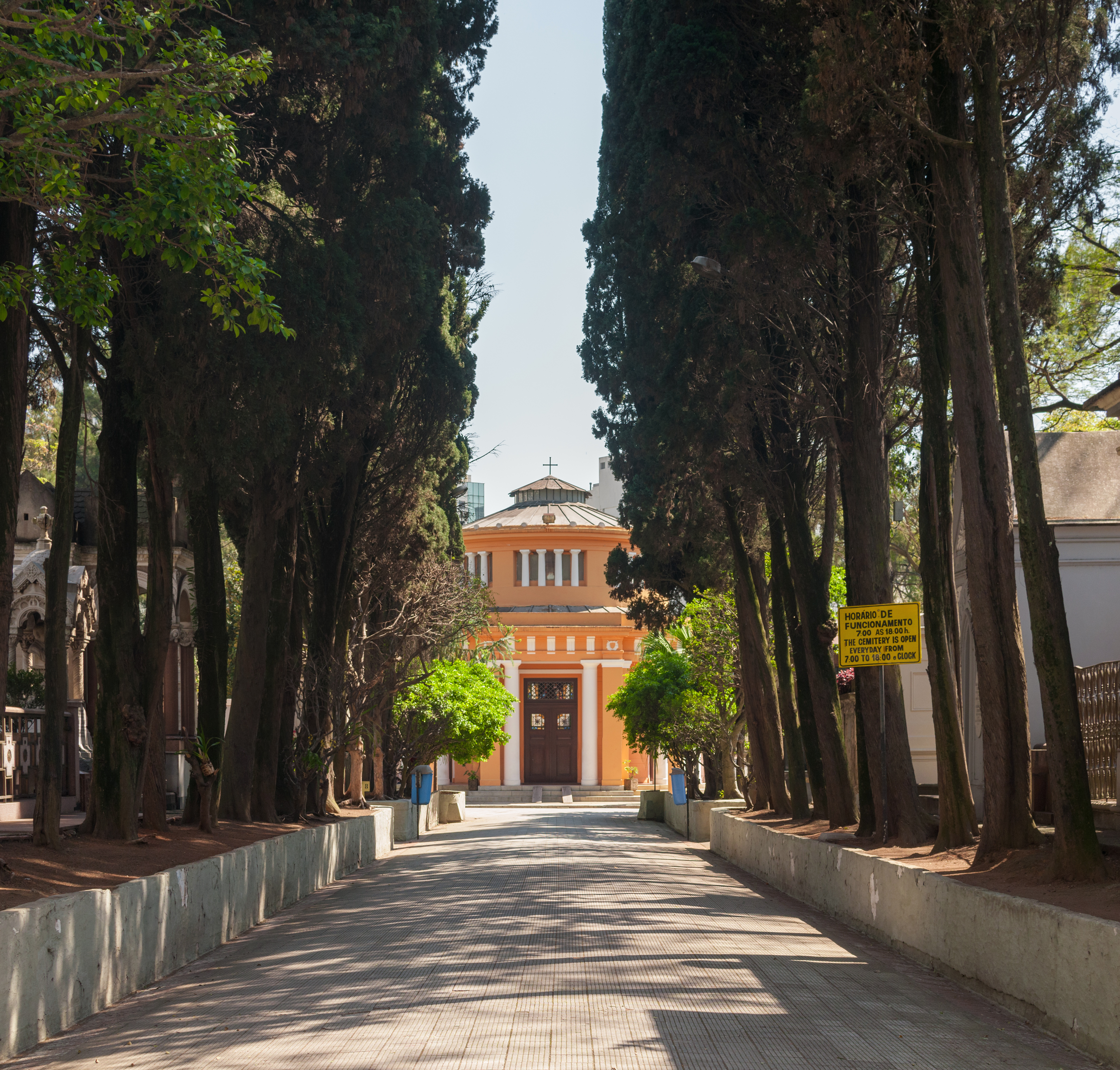
- Interactive map of Cemitério da Consolação

Details
- Established: 15 August 1858; 167 years ago
- Location: Rua da Consolação, 1660; São Paulo
- Country: Brazil
- Coordinates: 23°33′4″S 46°39′24″W
- Find a Grave: Cemitério da Consolação

The Cemitério da Consolação is a cemetery in São Paulo, Brazil. Located along the north side of the Rua da Consolação in the district of Consolação, it was founded on 15 August 1858, with the name of Cemitério Municipal, being the city's first public graveyard.

The cemetery is known by its pieces of funerary art, with graves, statues and mausoleums built and sculpted by artists such as Victor Brecheret, Ramos de Azevedo, Luigi Brizzolara and Galileo Emendabili.

== Notable burials ==
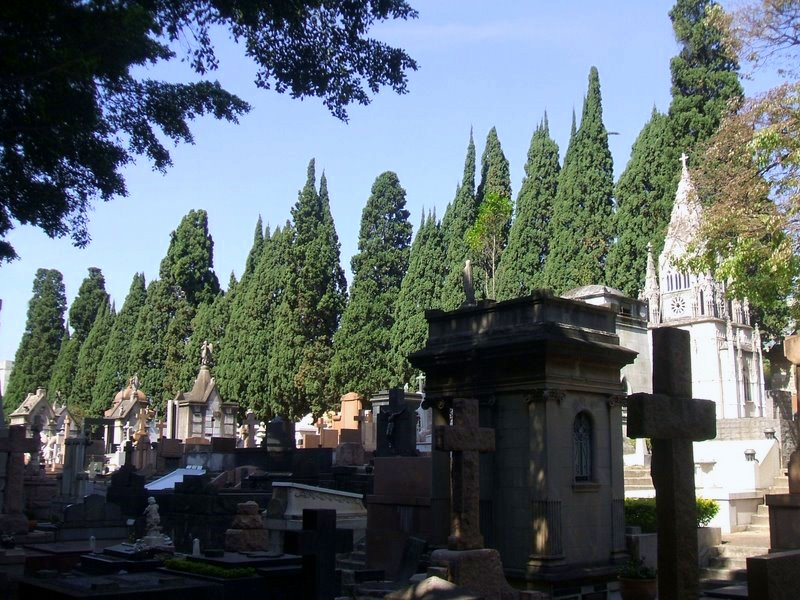
Consolação Cemetery

The cemetery houses the tombs of notable figures of São Paulo and Brazilian history. Some of them are:

- Tarsila do Amaral, artist
- Mario de Andrade, writer
- Oswald de Andrade, writer
- Ademar de Barros, politician
- Maria Bueno, tennis player
- Domitila de Castro, Marchioness of Santos, noblewoman and royal mistress
- José da Costa Carvalho, Marquis of Monte Alegre, Prime Minister of Brazil
- Alexandre Levy, pianist, composer and conductor
- Monteiro Lobato, writer
- Washington Luis, 13th President of Brazil
- Antonio de Alcântara Machado, journalist, politician and writer
- Count Francesco Matarazzo, Italian Brazilian businessman
- Olívia Guedes Penteado, art patron and philanthropist
- Campos Sales, 4th President of Brazil
