= Octávio Tarquínio de Sousa =

Brazilian historian (1889–1959)

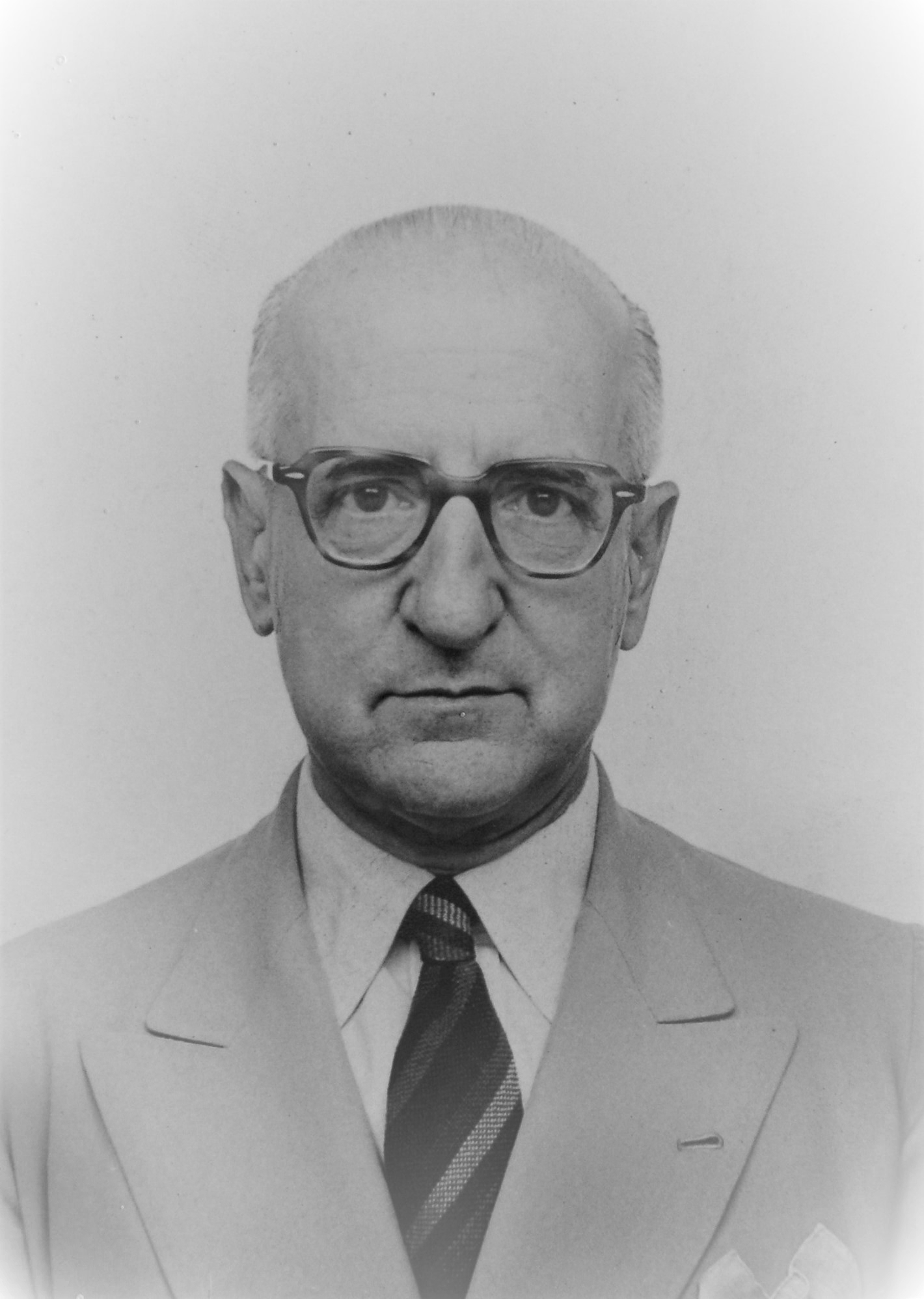
- Sousa in the 1950s
- Born: 7 September 1889; Rio de Janeiro, Empire of Brazil
- Died: 22 December 1959 (aged 70); Rio de Janeiro, Brazil
- Education: Faculty of Legal and Social Sciences of Rio de Janeiro
- Occupations: Writer; historian
- Spouse: Lucia Miguel Pereira
- Writing career
- Years active: 1914–1958
- Notable work: História dos Fundadores do Império do Brasil (1957)

Octávio Tarquínio de Sousa (7 September 1889 – 22 December 1959) was a Brazilian historian who wrote several works on the history of Brazil and some of its historical figures, such as emperor Pedro I, José Bonifácio and Diogo Antônio Feijó. His most notable work was the compilation História dos Fundadores do Império do Brasil (History of the Founders of the Empire of Brazil) published in 1957. Tarquínio died in a plane crash in 1959.

== Biography ==
=== Early life and legal career ===
The son of Bráulio Tarquínio de Sousa Amaranto and Joana Oliveira de Sousa, Tarquínio was born in Rio de Janeiro on 7 September 1889. He finished his secondary studies and joined the Faculty of Legal and Social Sciences of Rio de Janeiro, where he graduated with a law degree in 1907, beginning his career in the Postal Office administration and later joining the Postal Service of Rio de Janeiro from 1914 to 1918.

In 1918 he became the general attorney of the Federal Court of Audits. In 1924 he was the Brazilian representative to the International Conference on Emigration and Immigration held in Rome. In 1932 he became one of the court's ministers, retiring in 1946.

=== Career as writer and historian ===
Tarquínio began his career as a writer in 1914, when he published the work Monólogo das Coisas, a collection of short stories with some of his personal memoirs, and began to actively collaborate with the journal O Estado de S. Paulo from 1916 to 1917. In 1928 he published a translation to Portuguese of Omar Khayam's Rubaiyat, also acting as a literary critic.

Together with important Brazilian intellectuals who emerged in the 1930s, such as Gilberto Freyre, Caio Prado Júnior and Sérgio Buarque de Holanda, Tarquínio elaborated studies on Brazilian history, bringing new concepts to historiography and writing biographies about important historical Brazilian figures such as Bernardo Pereira de Vasconcelos, Evaristo da Veiga, Diogo Antônio Feijó, José Bonifácio and Pedro I. The biographies were written from 1937 to 1952 and later compiled in a single work: História dos Fundadores do Império do Brasil (History of the Founders of the Empire of Brazil), in 1957, becoming his most notable work.

Tarquínio was a member of the Brazilian Historic and Geographic Institute.

=== Death ===
Tarquínio died in a mid-air collision over Rio de Janeiro on 22 December 1959, together with his wife Lucia Miguel Pereira (b. 1904).
