= Princess Paula of Brazil =

Brazilian aristocrat (1823–1833)

Princess Paula
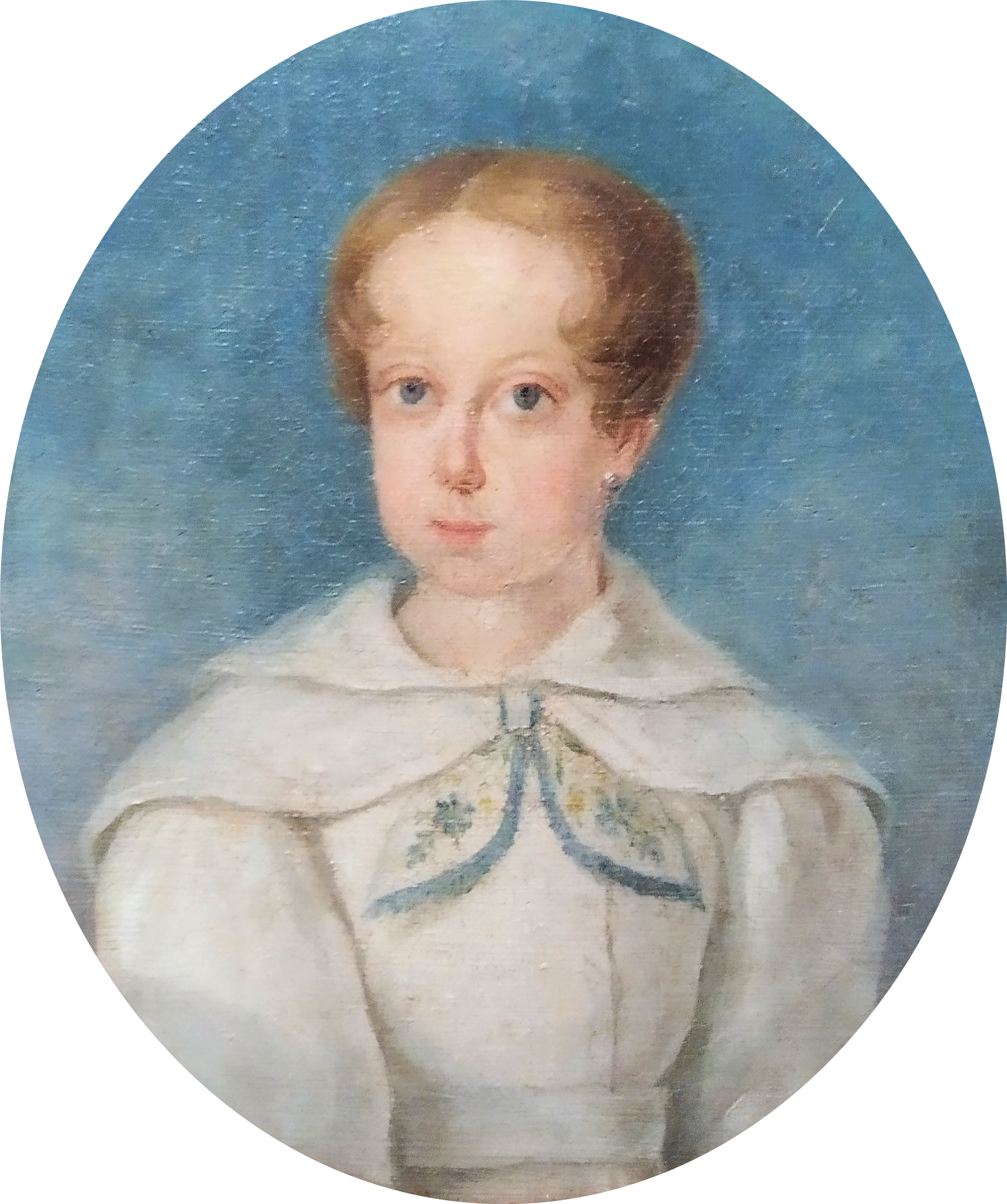
- Portrait, c. 1830, attributed to Simplício Rodrigues de Sá
- Born: 17 February 1823; Palace of São Cristóvão, Rio de Janeiro, Empire of Brazil
- Died: 16 January 1833 (aged 9); Palace of São Cristóvão, Rio de Janeiro, Empire of Brazil
- Burial: Convento de Santo Antônio (Convent of Saint Anthony), Rio de Janeiro
Names
- Paula Mariana Joana Carlota Faustina Matias Francisca Xavier de Paula Micaela Gabriela Rafaela Gonzaga
- House: Braganza
- Father: Pedro I of Brazil
- Mother: Maria Leopoldina of Austria

Dona Paula (17 February 1823 – 16 January 1833) was a princess of the Empire of Brazil, as well as an Infanta of Portugal, and thus, a member of the Brazilian branch of the Portuguese House of Braganza. Her parents were Emperor Dom Pedro I, the first ruler of an independent Brazil, and Archduchess Leopoldina of Austria. Born in Rio de Janeiro, Paula was the couple's fifth child and third daughter; she lost her mother at the age of three and her father at the age of eight, when he abdicated and left Brazil for Portugal, where he wanted to restore the throne of Paula's eldest sister, Maria da Glória, who should have become queen regnant of Portugal.

After her mother's death, Paula and her siblings were mainly raised by a slave, a wet-nurse and a statesman whom Pedro I had appointed to take care of his five children. Paula and her siblings were present when her father married his second wife, Amélie de Beauharnais, who eventually became like a mother to the children. After her father abdicated and left, the children were left alone in Brazil, as his father took Amélie with him; the two had a daughter abroad. Paula became severely ill in late 1832 and died in early 1833, at the age of nine. She was buried, at her father's request, in Rio de Janeiro.

== Biography ==
=== Birth ===
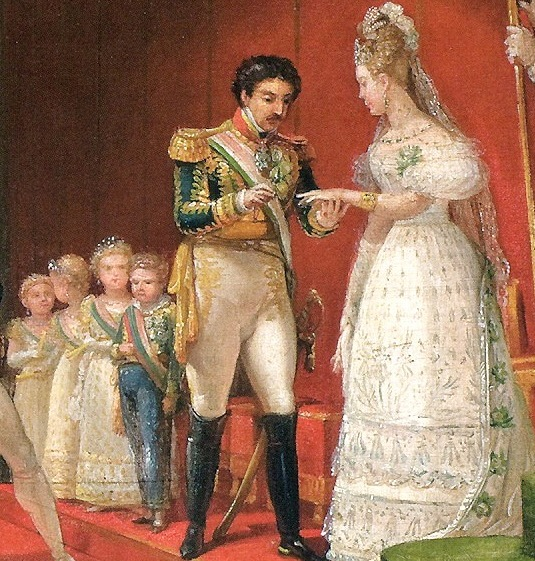
The Emperor's Second Marriage (detail) by Jean-Baptiste Debret. Behind the Emperor are his children by order of precedence: Pedro, Januária, Paula and Francisca.

Paula was born on 17 February 1823 at the Paço de São Cristóvão in Rio de Janeiro, the Brazilian capital; one week later, the princess was baptized Paula Mariana Joana Carlota Faustina Matias Francisca Xavier de Paula Micaela Gabriela Rafaela Gonzaga by Bishop José Caetano da Silva Coutinho, at the Imperial Chapel. The last four names were always bestowed on members of the royal family and the name Paula honored São Paulo, where the independence (see below) had been signed.

She was the third daughter of Emperor Dom Pedro I and his first wife Archduchess Leopoldina of Austria. Through her father, she was a member of the Brazilian branch of the House of Braganza, which was an illegitimate branch of the House of Aviz. She was thus a granddaughter of King João VI. Through her mother, she was a niece of Napoleon and a first cousin of Franz Joseph I of Austria. As the daughter of a member of the ruling Portuguese royal house, Paula was referred to by the honorific Dona (Lady) from birth.

The year before Paula's birth, the independence of Brazil had been declared in September 1822; as Pedro only had daughters, Paula was supposed to have been fourth in the line of succession to the Portuguese throne. However, under Portuguese law, Paula was a foreigner having been born after the independence and was thus excluded from the line of succession. However, her elder sister Maria da Glória was not excluded from the succession having been born in 1819; she ascended the Portuguese throne after the death of João VI and the abdication of Pedro on 28 May 1826. Instead of her mother, Paula was suckled by the same wet nurse who would later suckle the Prince Imperial.

=== Life ===
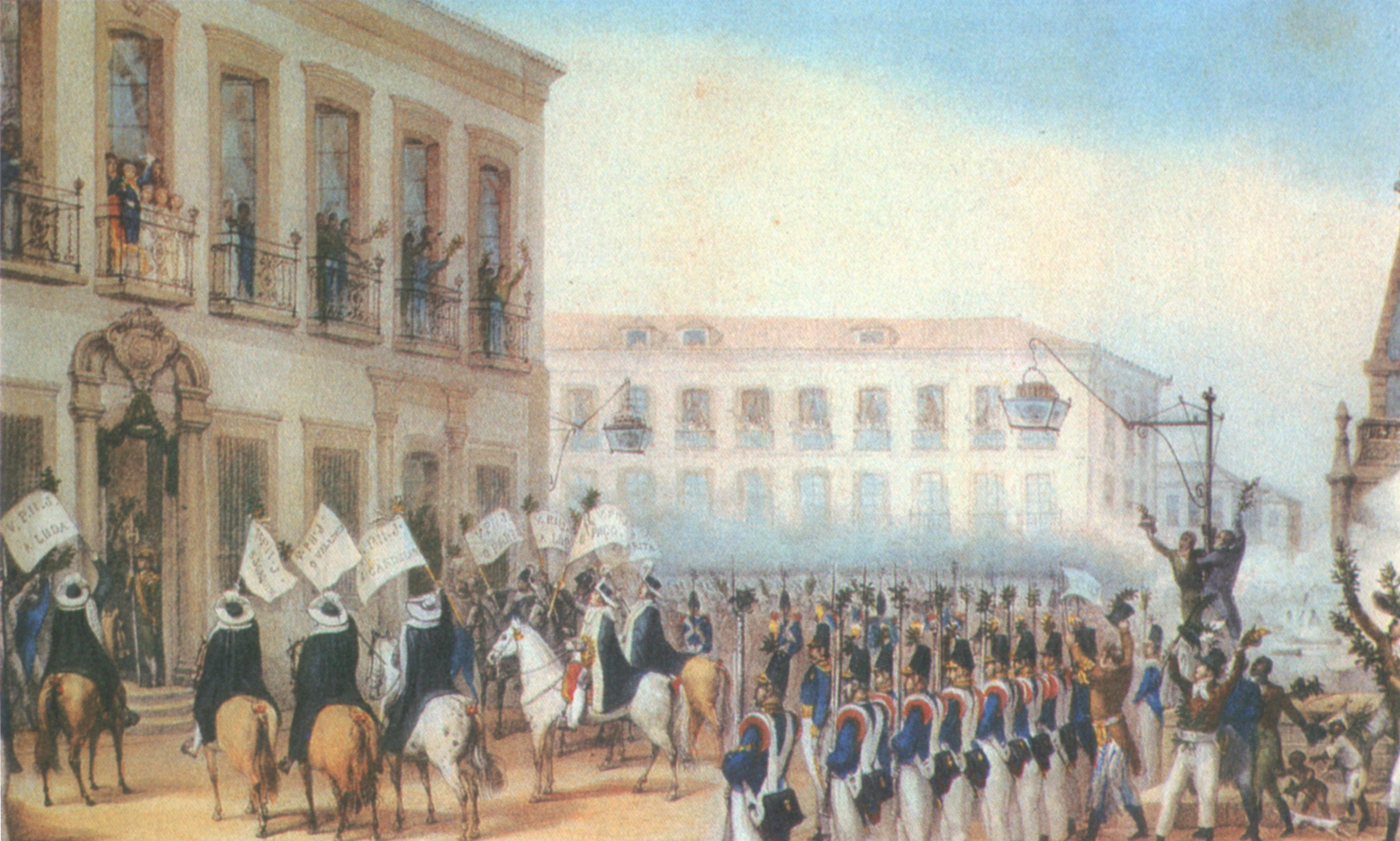
Acclamation of D. Pedro II by Debret. In the up-left corner, Pedro is on the balcony with his sisters.

On 11 December 1826, Empress Leopoldina died after either giving birth to a stillborn son or suffering a miscarriage. However, at the time there were rumors that purported Pedro had actually killed Leopoldina during a heated discussion. Supposedly, Pedro had kicked Leopoldina in the womb, causing her to have a miscarriage and die. Domitila de Castro, Pedro's longtime mistress, and Philipp von Mareschal, the Austrian minister in Brazil, had witnessed the quarrel and Mareschal stated that the couple exchanged only insults and nothing else.

Pedro greatly missed his wife and arranged a second marriage, this time to Napoleon's step-granddaughter, Amélie de Beauharnais von Leuchtenberg. The two were married on 17 October 1829. Amélie became like a mother to Pedro's five surviving children, Maria da Glória (born 1819), Januária (born 1822), Paula, Francisca (born 1824) and the Prince Imperial (born 1825), all of whom adored their new mother.

The Emperor abdicated the Brazilian throne of 7 April 1831 and left Brazil for Portugal in order to support his eldest daughter's claim to the Portuguese throne. Pedro's vessel left that very morning and Pedro, now styling himself "the Duke of Braganza", took with him Amélie, Maria da Glória and his sister Ana de Jesus. The children never saw their father or stepmother again. Before he left, Pedro had appointed José Bonifácio de Andrada as legal guardian, Mariana de Verna Coutinho to continue as aia, and an afro-Brazilian war veteran named Rafael to generally tend to his children. Out of these three, Rafael remained loyal to the Emperor until his death in 1889.

Left with no one else, the children formed close bonds with each other, they were even "dependent on each other." Besides this, the three sisters were obedient and helpful towards their brother, who was now Emperor of Brazil and outranked them. The children regularly attended Glória Church, studied, played and had meals as a family; this is something that Bonifácio and Coutinho tended to personally. On 9 April 1831, the Prince Imperial was acclaimed as the new Emperor. While the Emperor was displayed at a palace window, his sisters stood by him. Meanwhile, in Paris, Amélie gave birth to a daughter, Princess Maria Amélia.

=== Death ===
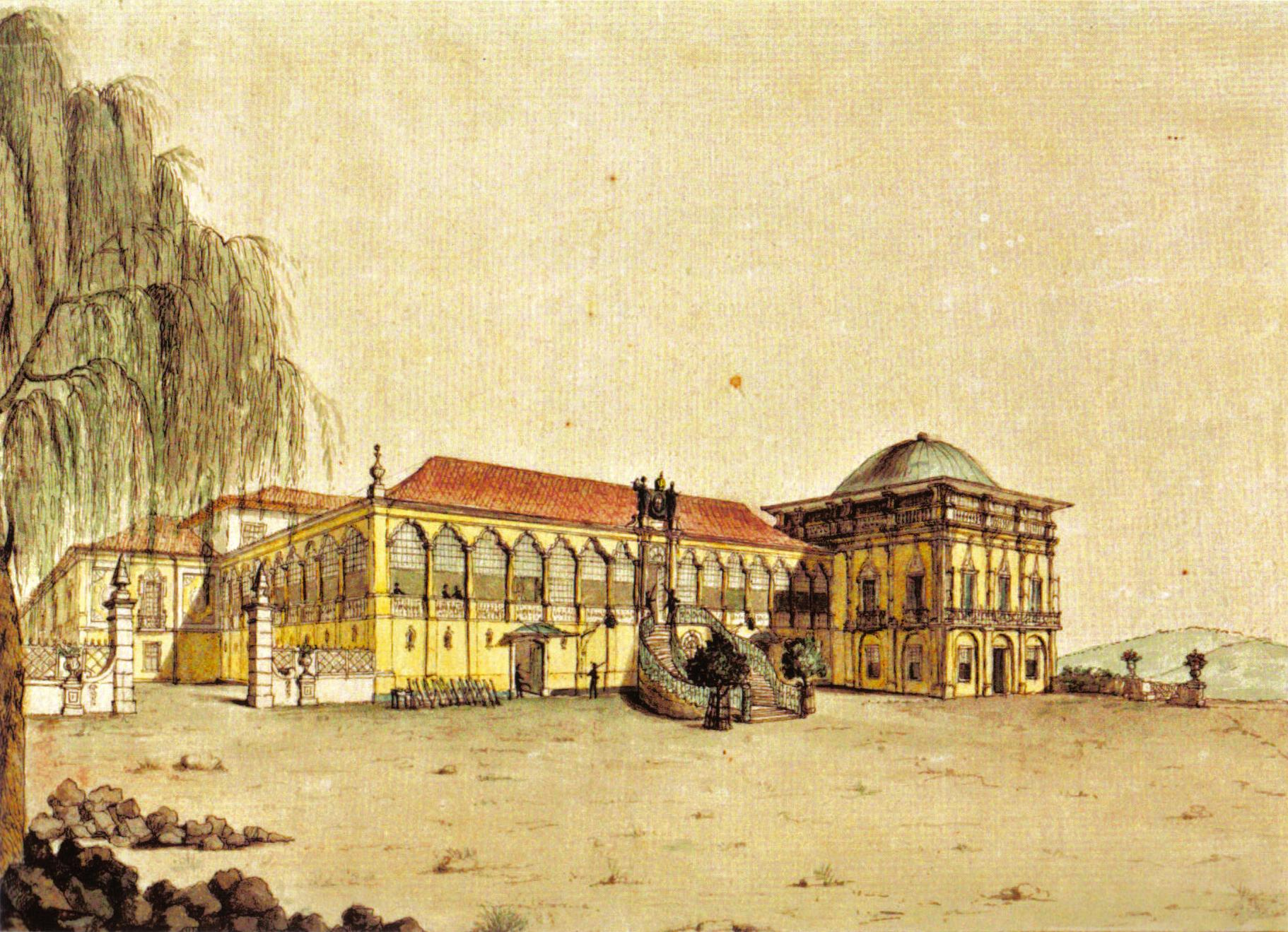
Paço de São Cristóvão, where Paula was born, lived and died. 1817 painting by Debret.

Paula was described as "filled with peace, fortitude and resignation", or "the most quiet and gentle of Leopoldina and Pedro's children" and seldom complained, even though she had suffered from frequent health problems ever since infancy; she was often so sick that she could not do her lessons with her siblings. She had never been robust or entirely healthy until the middle of 1831, when she had a bout of strength: she was able to lead an active life and grew taller.

However, at the end of 1832, she became severely ill. Historian Roderick Barman suggests that Paula had meningitis; however scholar Mick Isle introduces the theory that Paula had malaria. Isle further states that the royal doctors administered quinine (both orally and anally), soups, leeches, mustard plaster and applied acidic substances to her skin; this made the Princess "scream out in pain."

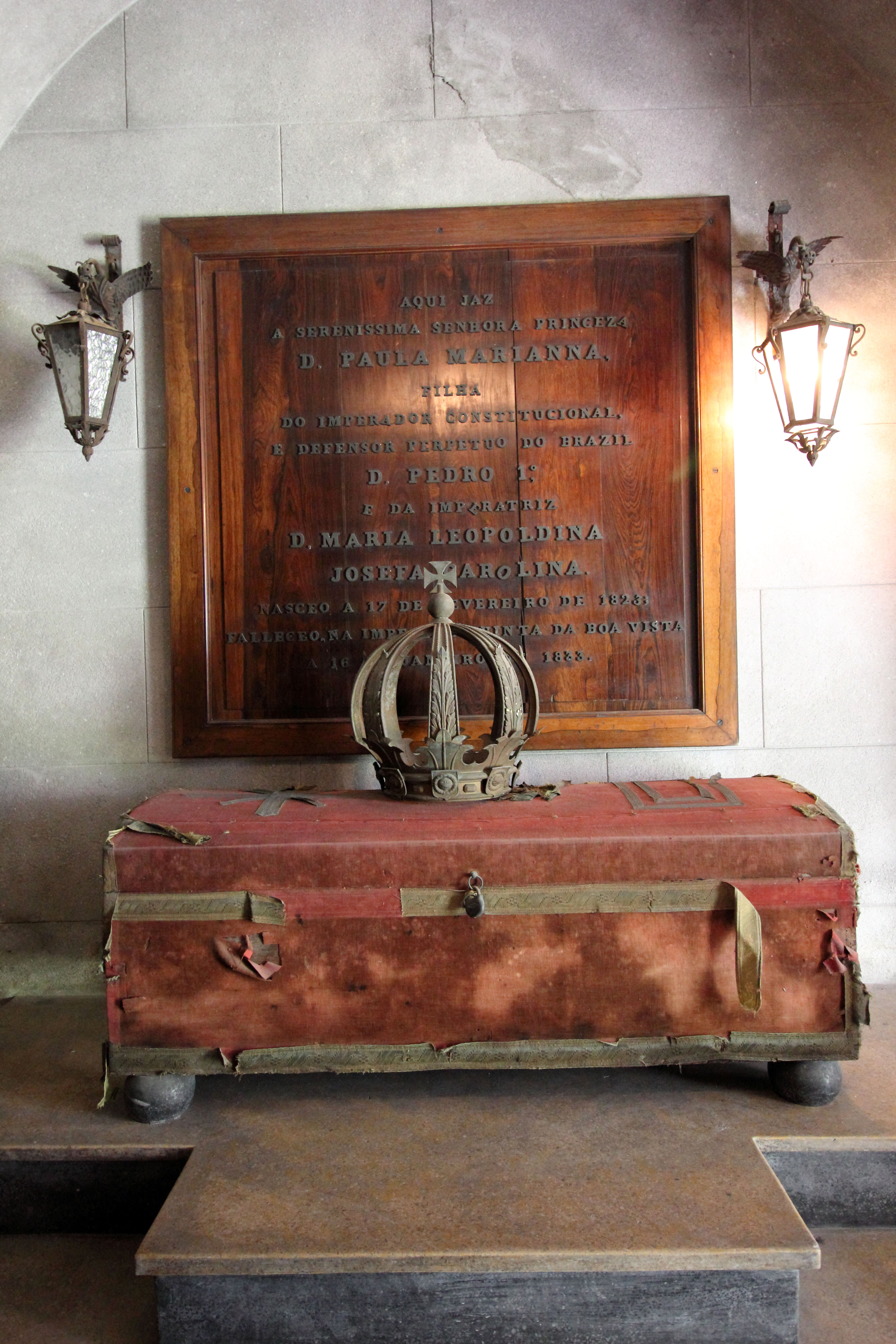
Paula's casket in the Convent of Saint Anthony in Rio de Janeiro.

Nonetheless, these techniques were useless, for Paula died on 16 January 1833, one month shy of her tenth birthday. Upon learning of his daughter's impending death, the Duke of Braganza, who was in Porto, made two requests to Bonifácio: "the first is to keep for me a bit of her beautiful hair; the second is to place her in the convent of Our Lady of Good Aid and in the same spot where her good mother, my Leopoldina for whom even today I still shed tears of longing, is located ... I ask you as a father, as a pitiful desolate father, to do me a favor and go in person to deposit next to the body of her mother this fruit of her womb and on this occasion pray for one and other." Paula was given a grand state funeral which was not seen again until the death of Pedro II's son, Prince Imperial Afonso, in 1847. Her current burial place is in Rio de Janeiro's Convent of Saint Anthony, next to her brother João Carlos and later her nephews Afonso and Pedro. Her death made her siblings feel even more abandoned. In 1834, the Duke of Braganza also died.

== Ancestry ==
Ancestors of Princess Paula of Brazil

8. Peter III of Portugal
4. John VI of Portugal and Brazil
9. Maria I of Portugal and Brazil
2. Pedro I of Brazil and IV of Portugal
10. Charles IV of Spain
5. Carlota Joaquina of Spain
11. Maria Luisa of Parma
1. Princess Paula of Brazil
12. Leopold II, Holy Roman Emperor
6. Francis II, Holy Roman Emperor
13. Maria Luisa of Spain
3. Maria Leopoldina of Austria
14. Ferdinand I of the Two Sicilies
7. Maria Theresa of Naples and Sicily
15. Maria Carolina of Austria

== Bibliography ==
- Barman, Roderick J. (1999). Citizen Emperor: Pedro II and the Making of Brazil, 1825–1891. Stanford, California: Stanford University Press. ISBN 978-0-8047-3510-0.
- Calmon, Pedro (1975). História de D. Pedro II (in Portuguese). Vol. 1–5. Rio de Janeiro: J. Olympio.
- Carvalho, José Murilo de (2007). D. Pedro II: ser ou não ser (in Portuguese). São Paulo: Companhia das Letras. ISBN 978-85-359-0969-2.
- Costa, Sérgio Corrêa da (1972) [1950]. Every Inch a King: A Biography of Dom Pedro I First Emperor of Brazil. Translated by Samuel Putnam. London: Robert Hale. ISBN 978-0-7091-2974-5.
- Costa, Sérgio Corrêa da (1995). As quatro coroas de D. Pedro I (in Portuguese). Rio de Janeiro: Paz e Terra. ISBN 978-85-219-0129-7.
- Instituto Histórico e Geográfico Brasileiro (1969). Revista do Instituto Histórico e Geográfico Brasileiro (in Portuguese). Rio de Janeiro.
- Isle, Mick (2001). Malaria. New York: Rosen. ISBN 978-0-8239-3342-6.
- Longo, James McMurtry (2008). Isabel Orleans-Bragança: The Brazilian Princess Who Freed the Slaves. Jefferson, North Carolina: McFarland & Company. ISBN 978-0-7864-3201-1.
- Lyra, Heitor (1977). História de Dom Pedro II (1825–1891): Ascenção (1825–1870) (in Portuguese). Vol. 1. Belo Horizonte: Itatiaia.
- Macaulay, Neill (1986). Dom Pedro: The Struggle for Liberty in Brazil and Portugal, 1798–1834. Durham, North Carolina: Duke University Press. ISBN 978-0-8223-0681-8.
- Montgomery-Massingberd, Hugh (1977). Burke's Royal Families of the World: Europe and Latin America. Vol. 1. Buckingham: Burke's Peerage. ISBN 978-0-85011-023-4.
- Morato, Francisco (1835). Memória sobre a soccessão da coroa de Portugal, no caso de não haver descendentes de Sua Magestade Fidelíssima a rainha D. Maria II (in Portuguese). Lisbon: Typographia de Firmin Didot.
- Olivieri, Antonio Carlos (1999). Dom Pedro II, Imperador do Brasil (in Portuguese). São Paulo: Callis. ISBN 978-85-86797-19-4.
- Schwarcz, Lilia Moritz (1998). As barbas do Imperador: D. Pedro II, um monarca nos trópicos (in Portuguese) (2nd ed.). São Paulo: Companhia das Letras. ISBN 978-85-7164-837-1.
- Santos, Eugénio Francisco dos (2011). "Fruta fina em casca grossa". Revista de História da Biblioteca Nacional (in Portuguese). 74. Rio de Janeiro: SABIN. ISSN 1808-4001.
- Sousa, Octávio Tarquínio de (1972) [1954]. A vida de D. Pedro I (in Portuguese). Vol. 3. Rio de Janeiro: José Olympio. OCLC 634896259.
- Vainfas, Ronaldo (2002). Dicionário do Brasil Imperial (in Portuguese). Rio de Janeiro: Objetiva. ISBN 978-85-7302-441-8.
