= Amélie of Leuchtenberg =

Empress of Brazil from 1829 to 1831

- Duchess of Braganza
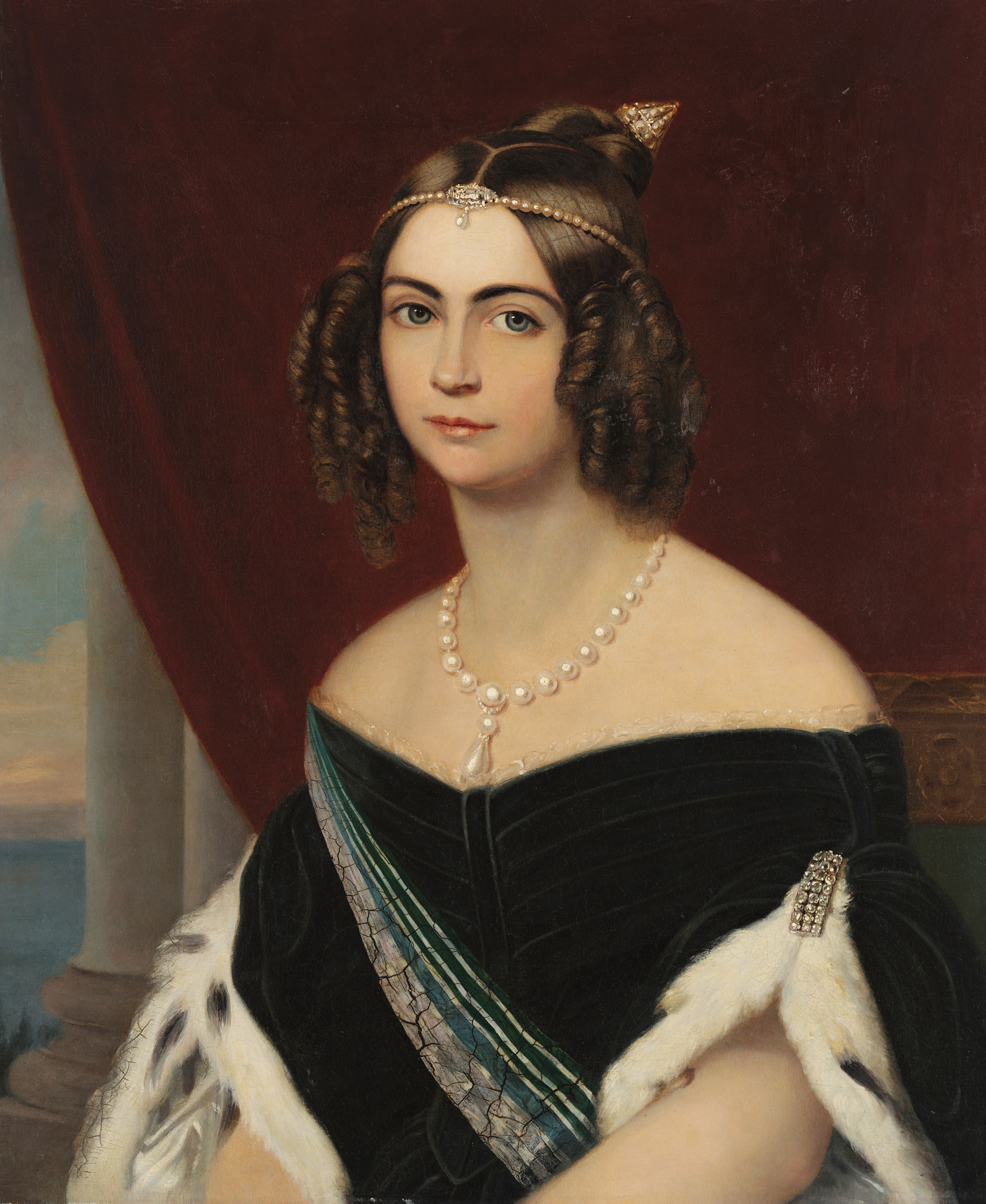
- Portrait by Friedrich Dürck, 1839

Empress consort of Brazil
- Tenure: 2 August 1829 – 7 April 1831
- Born: 31 July 1812; Milan, Kingdom of Italy
- Died: 26 January 1873 (aged 60); Lisbon, Kingdom of Portugal
- Burial: 1873; Pantheon of the House of Braganza, Lisbon; 1984; Monument to the Independence of Brazil, São Paulo
- Spouse: Pedro I of Brazil (m. 1829; died 1834)
- Issue: Princess Maria Amélia of Brazil
Names
- Amélia Augusta Eugénia Napoleona de Beauharnais
- House: Beauharnais
- Father: Eugène, Duke of Leuchtenberg
- Mother: Princess Augusta of Bavaria

Amélie of Leuchtenberg (Portuguese: Amélia Augusta Eugénia Napoleona de Beauharnais; French: Amélie Auguste Eugénie Napoléonne de Beauharnais; 31 July 1812 – 26 January 1873) was Empress of Brazil as the wife of Pedro I of Brazil.

She was the granddaughter of Josephine de Beauharnais, Empress of the French. Her father, Eugène de Beauharnais, was the only son of Empress Josephine and her first husband Alexandre, Viscount of Beauharnais. He thus became a stepson of Napoleon Bonaparte when his mother married the future emperor. The mother of Empress Amélie was Princess Augusta, daughter of Maximilian I, King of Bavaria.

== Early life ==
Amélie of Leuchtenberg was born in Milan on 31 July 1812 to Eugène de Beauharnais, Duke of Leuchtenberg, and Princess Augusta of Bavaria. She spent her early childhood in the Napoleonic Kingdom of Italy. In 1814, when Amélie was two years old, French emperor Napoleon Bonaparte was defeated, and her family moved to Munich in the Kingdom of Bavaria, where she grew up.

Princess Augusta personally directed Amélie's education. Contemporary observers regarded her as one of the best educated and best prepared princesses in the German states. As Amélie approached adulthood, Princess Augusta considered a royal marriage that would preserve the standing of the House of Leuchtenberg. When a marriage to Emperor Pedro I of Brazil was arranged, Augusta personally prepared her daughter for life at the Brazilian court.

== Family ==
Amélie belonged to the House of Beauharnais. Through her father, she was a granddaughter of Joséphine de Beauharnais and a step-granddaughter of Napoleon Bonaparte. Through her mother, she was a granddaughter of Maximilian I Joseph of Bavaria.

Like many members of her family, Amélie grew up among Europe's ruling dynasties. Her sister Josephine of Leuchtenberg became queen consort of King Oscar I of Sweden, while her brother Auguste de Beauharnais, 2nd Duke of Leuchtenberg married Queen Maria II of Portugal.

== Marriage ==
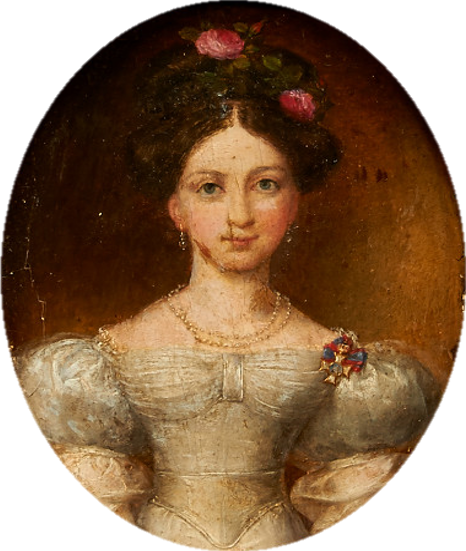
Amélie at age 17, by Friedrich Wilhelm Spohr, 1829

After the death of his first wife, the Austrian archduchess Maria Leopoldina, in December 1826, Emperor Pedro I of Brazil (and King Pedro IV of Portugal) sent the Marquis of Barbacena to Europe to find him a second wife. His task was not easy; several factors complicated the search. First, Dom Pedro had stipulated four conditions: a good family background, beauty, virtue and culture. Conversely, the emperor of Brazil did not have a particularly good image in Europe: his relationship with the Marchioness of Santos was notorious, and few eligible princesses were expected to be eager to leave the courts of Europe to marry a widower who had a tarnished reputation as a husband, becoming step-mother to his five children. To make matters worse, the former father-in-law of Dom Pedro, Francis I of Austria, had a low opinion of his son-in-law's political views, and apparently acted to prevent a new marriage to ensure that his grandchildren would inherit the throne of Brazil if they survived infancy.

After refusals by eight princesses that turned the ambassador into an object of scorn in the courts of Europe, Barbacena, in agreement with the Emperor, lowered his requirements, seeking for Dom Pedro a wife merely "good and virtuous". Amélie now became a good possibility, but their encounter was brought about not by Barbacena, but by Domingos Borges de Barros, Viscount of Pedra Branca, minister in Paris, to whom she had been pointed out. She came from a distinguished and ancient line on her mother's side, the Wittelsbachs, but her father, an exile who shared in the disgrace of Napoleon Bonaparte's deposition as emperor, was not an optimal marital match. However, that was her sole "defect". The princess was tall, very beautiful, well proportioned, with a delicate face. She had blue eyes and brownish-golden hair. António Teles da Silva Caminha e Meneses, Marquis of Resende, sent to verify the beauty of the young lady, praised her highly, saying that she had "a physical air that like that the painter Correggio gave us in his paintings of the Queen of Sheba". She was also cultured and sensitive. A contemporary piece in The Times of London affirms that she was one of the best educated and best prepared princesses in the German world.

The marriage contract was signed on 29 May 1829 in England, and ratified on 30 June in Munich by Amélie's mother, the Duchess of Leuchtenberg, who had tutored her daughter personally. On 30 July of that year, in Brazil, a treaty of marriage between Pedro I and Amélie of Leuchtenberg was promulgated. Upon confirming the marriage, Dom Pedro definitively broke his links to the Marchioness of Santos and, as evidence of his good intentions, instituted the Order of the Rose, with the motto "Amor e Fidelidade" ("Love and Fidelity"). A proxy marriage ceremony on 2 August in the chapel of the Palais Leuchtenberg in Munich was a simple affair with few in attendance, as Amélie insisted on donating to a Munich orphanage the appreciable amount Dom Pedro had sent for a ceremony with full pomp. Dom Pedro was represented by the Marquis of Barbacena. Amélie was barely seventeen years old; Dom Pedro was thirty.

Amélie's mother foresaw the difficulties her daughter might face, and prepared her carefully. Besides a good dowry and trousseau, she gave her a great deal of advice, recommending that she be demonstrative of her feelings and overcome any timidity so as not to discourage her husband, that she be loving toward her stepchildren, and above all that she remain faithful, as empress, to the interests of the Brazilians. Scientist Carl Friedrich von Martius was sent with her on the journey to teach her about Brazil, and Ana Romana de Aragão Calmon, Countess of Itapagipe, to familiarize her with her husband's personality and the customs of the Brazilian court, and to teach her Portuguese.

== Arrival in Brazil and life as empress ==
The Emperor's Second Marriage, painted by Jean-Baptiste Debret

Amélie sailed to the New World from Ostend, the Netherlands on the frigate Imperatriz. Among those accompanying her on board were Barbacena and the 10-year-old Maria II of Portugal in whose favor her father had renounced his rights to the Portuguese throne back in 1826. Barbacena, on that same trip, had received the mission to bring Maria to the care of her grandfather, Austrian emperor Francis I, but in the middle of the journey learned that Maria's throne had been usurped by Miguel, brother of Dom Pedro, and decided instead to take her to England, which he considered a safer place. After concluding the imperial marriage contract, they embarked again for Brazil together with Amélie's entourage, including Amélie's brother, Auguste de Beauharnais, 2nd Duke of Leuchtenberg.

They arrived in Rio de Janeiro on 15 October 1829, after a crossing that went more rapidly than planned. Tradition says that upon hearing that the ship was approaching, Dom Pedro embarked on a tugboat to meet it on the far side of the bar, and that he collapsed with emotion upon seeing his wife on deck. Shortly after the newlyweds' first encounter, Dom Pedro's children by his first marriage were brought out to their new stepmother's ship for the couple and children to lunch together. The following day at noon, under a heavy rain, Amélie disembarked and was received with a solemn procession. She then went with Dom Pedro to the Imperial Chapel to receive the nuptial blessings. All were dazzled by her beauty, highlighted by a long white gown and a robe embroidered in silver, in the French fashion. After the ceremony came a public celebration with fireworks, and a grand state banquet for the court.

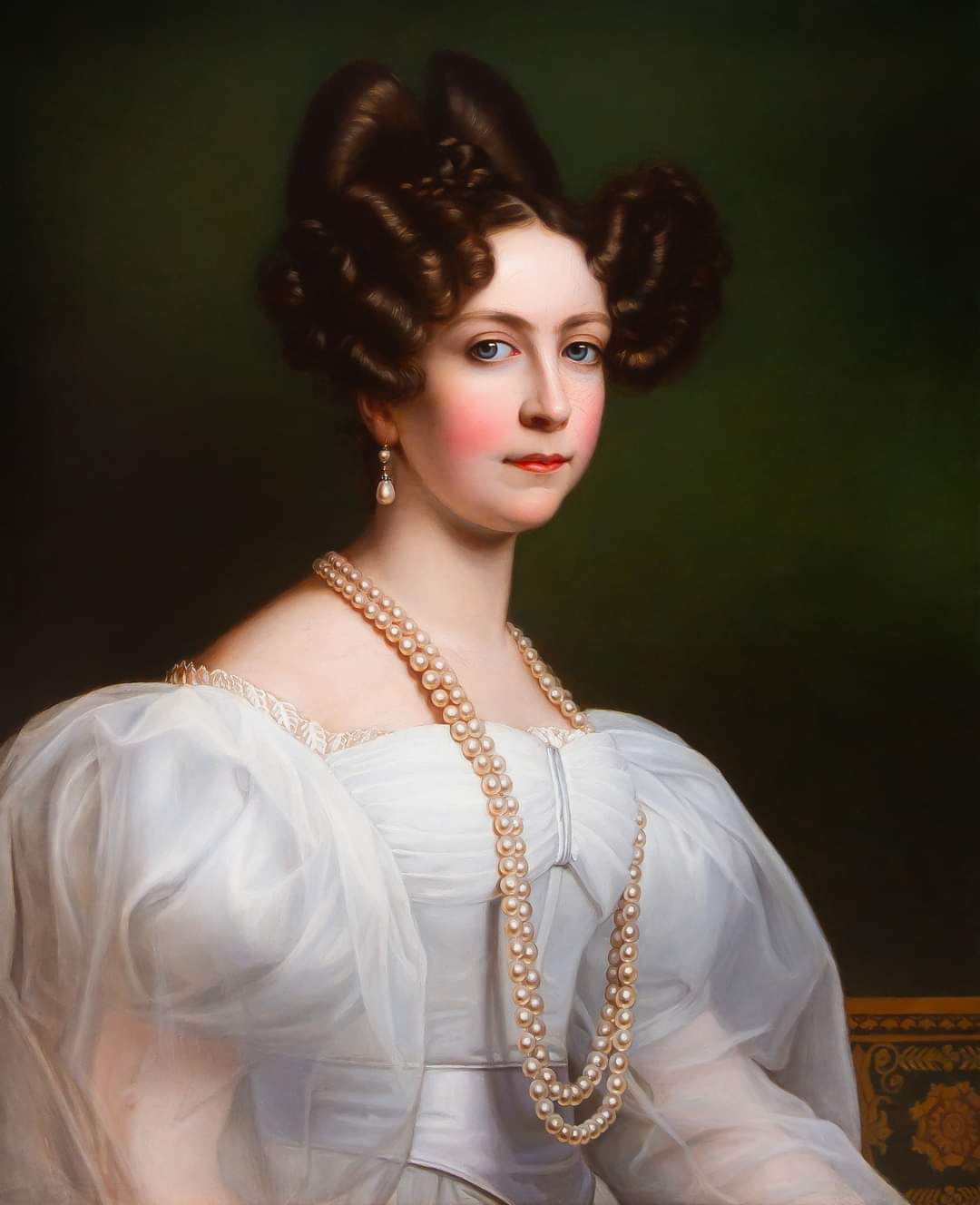
Portrait of Empress Amélie by Joseph Karl Stieler, 1829

In January 1830 the new empress was formally presented in court, with a dance at which all of the ladies dressed in pink, the empress's favorite color. The following day, the couple began their honeymoon, spending six weeks at the ranch of Father Correa, in Serra da Estrela, future locale of the city of Petrópolis. On their return they encountered a court troubled by problems caused by the emperor's intimate confidante Chalaça (Francisco Gomes da Silva). Barbacena took the opportunity to rid himself of his old foe, recommending that he leave for Europe, in which he counted on the support of the new empress, anxious to break one more link to her husband's adventurous past. She had already shown a strong attitude in refusing from the outset to receive at court Isabel Maria de Alcântara, Duchess of Goiás, Dom Pedro's daughter by the Marchioness of Santos, and demanding that Isabel Maria be sent to school in Switzerland.

Upon settling into the imperial palace, the Paço de São Cristóvão, and perceiving what she considered an inadequate standard of protocol, Amélie established French as the court language and adopted a ceremonial modeled after European courts. She sought to update the cuisine and fashion, redecorated the palace, acquired new tableware and silverware, and attempted to refine the manners of the court. She achieved at least a partial success in this last, and the elegance of the Empress, always impeccably dressed, became internationally famous.

Their marriage was a happy one, unlike Dom Pedro's first, and she reportedly had a good relationship with her legitimate stepchildren as well. Her beauty, good sense, and kindness promptly won the affections of both her husband and his children by his first marriage. She made sure that the latter had a good family environment and received a good education. Shortly after the marriage, a French traveler reported "it appears that the empress continues to exercise her influence over the children of Dom Pedro. The happy results are already apparent, she has already made considerable renovations to the palace, and order has commenced to reign; the princesses' education is supervised and directed personally by the empress", with the same care going to the heir to the throne, little Prince Pedro de Alcântara (later Emperor Pedro II of Brazil); the proof of this last being that he soon began to call her "mamãe" ("mommy"). Amélie always expressed her affection for Pedro II, and maintained a correspondence with him until the end of her life, trying to instruct and support him. Nearly six decades of their correspondence survive. Dom Pedro II reciprocated her kindness, soliciting her help in arranging marriages for his own daughters and visiting her in Lisbon in 1871.

Her presence was also important in restoring her husband's popularity and giving him courage during a difficult period for the new empire, but the popular enthusiasm generated by the marriage was short-lived. José Bonifácio advised her on what her husband would need to do to reconcile with the people of Brazil, but nothing worked. The precarious economic situation and political turbulence precipitated the inevitable crisis and on 7 April 1831, Dom Pedro abdicated the throne in favor of his young son.

== Return to Europe ==
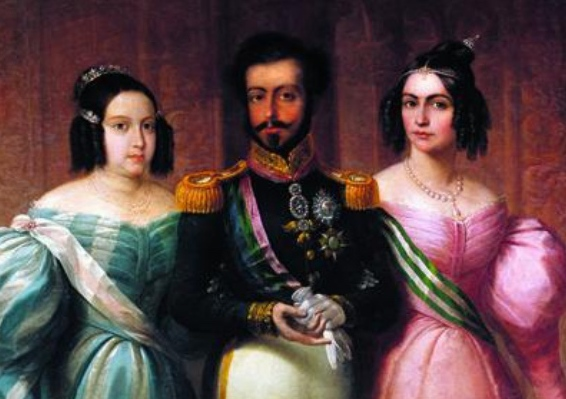
The Duke and Duchess of Braganza (right) with Queen Maria II of Portugal, Pedro's eldest daughter, just months before his death, 1834

After Dom Pedro I abdicated the crown, Amélie accompanied her husband back to Europe. They now held the titles of Duke and Duchess of Braganza. She was three months pregnant and suffered badly from nausea on the sea voyage. After resupplying the ship at Faial Island in the Azores, they arrived at Cherbourg, in France, on 10 June 1831. They were received with the honors appropriate to reigning monarchs, greeted with a 21-gun cannon salute and by a detachment of 5,000 soldiers of the National Guard. The prefecture of the city offered them a palace as accommodation, but a mere ten days after their arrival Dom Pedro left for London, leaving behind Amélie, who was reunited with Maria da Glória the 23rd of the same month.

Amélie soon established residence in Paris, with Maria da Glória and with Dom Pedro's illegitimate daughter Isabel Maria, Duchess of Goiás, whom Amélie ended up adopting as her own daughter. On 30 November 1831 Amélie gave birth to Princess Maria Amélia, who would prove to be her only child. Her father expressed his happiness in a letter to young Dom Pedro II: "Divine Providence has seen fit to diminish the sadness my paternal heart feels for the separation from V.M.I. (Vossa Majestade Imperial, "Your Imperial Majesty") giving to me a daughter and, to V.M.I., another sister and subject".

Meanwhile, Dom Pedro I, as Duke of Braganza, began a bloody battle against his brother Dom Miguel I of Portugal for the Portuguese crown, in the name of his daughter Maria da Glória. Upon receiving the news of the Duke's victory in Lisbon, Amélie left with her daughter and stepdaughter for Portugal, arriving in the capital on 22 September 1833. With Miguel defeated and exiled from Portugal, Dom Pedro and his family established themselves first at Ramalhão Palace and later at Queluz Palace.

== Widowhood and final years ==
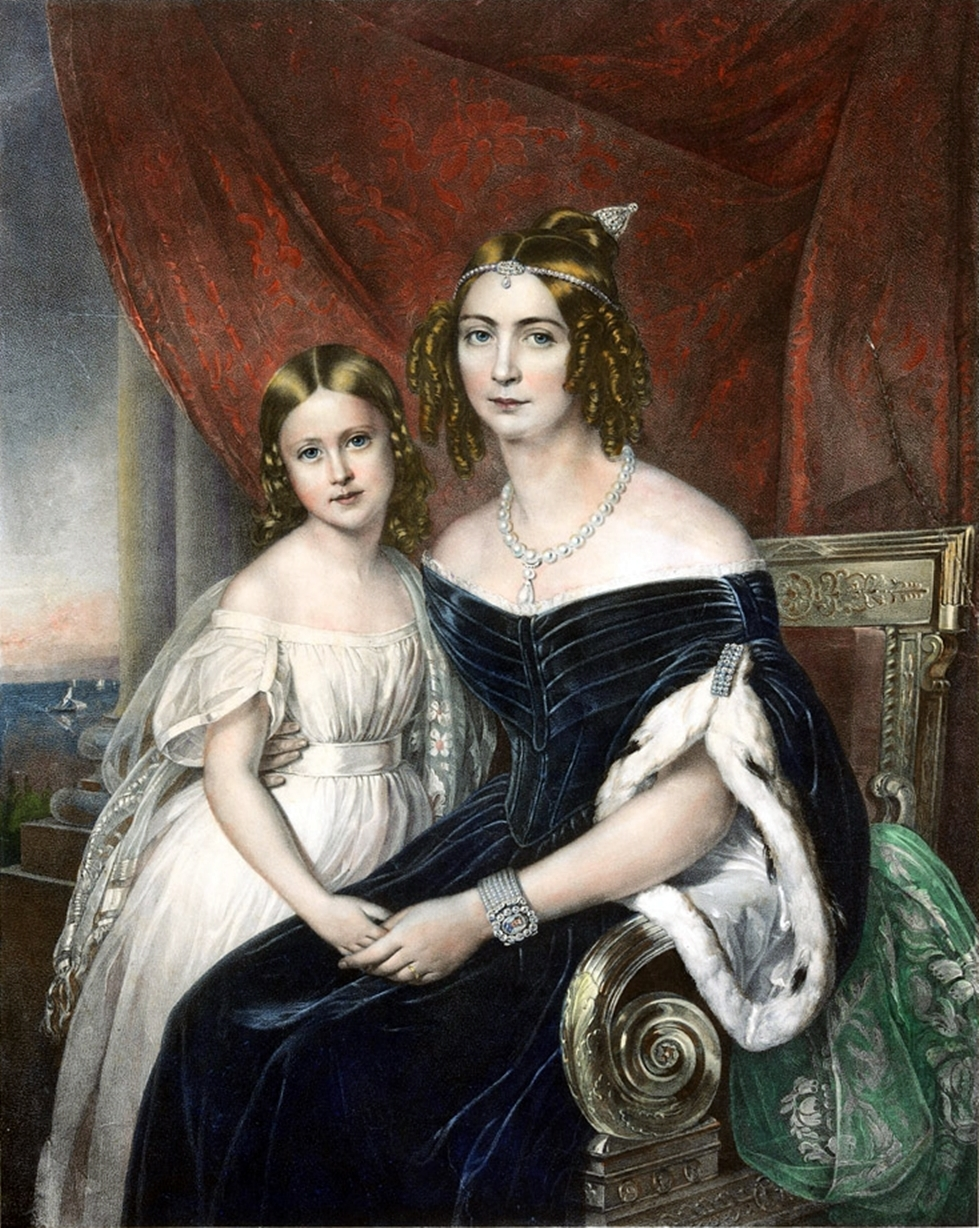
Amélie with her daughter, Princess Maria Amélia, 1840

The venturesome life of Dom Pedro had undermined his health; he contracted tuberculosis, and died on 24 September 1834. Amélie respected the provisions of his will. He had wished that Maria Isabel de Alcântara, Countess of Iguaçu, his illegitimate daughter by the Marchioness of Santos, be given a good European education like her sister, the Duchess of Goiás. However, the Marchioness declined to send the girl. Dom Pedro also stipulated legacies for his other illegitimate children, reducing the inheritance of Amélie and her own daughter; the provision showed that Dom Pedro loved all his children, legitimate or not.

Amélie never remarried; she moved to the Palácio das Janelas Verdes ("Palace of Green Windows", also known as the Palácio de Alvor-Pombal, now housing Portugal's National Museum of Ancient Art) and dedicated herself to charitable works and to her daughter's education. Maria Amélia showed herself to be very intelligent and to be a talented musician. Occasionally, Amélie visited Bavaria with her daughter. Despite being established in Portugal, they were not considered part of the Portuguese royal family. Amélie solicited recognition for herself and her daughter as members of the Brazilian imperial family, thereby entitled to a pension, but Dom Pedro II was still a minor and the Brazilian Regency feared possible influence by the empress-widow Amélie in state business, as well as the possibility of her adherence to political factions that might harm the government. They refused to recognize her daughter Maria Amélie as a Brazilian princess and forbade her to set foot in the country. This situation changed when Dom Pedro II reached majority. His relations with them were good, and on 5 July 1841 Amélie and Maria Amélia were recognized as members of the Brazilian imperial family. Prior to that, Maria Amélia's status and place in the line of succession had been doubtful, because she was conceived in Brazil while her father, Pedro I, was still the emperor, but was born abroad, after his abdication, and Brazil's Constitution invested the Imperial Parliament to settle doubts pertaining to the imperial succession. Soon after the start of his personal reign, Pedro II requested that Parliament should recognize his sister's rights. On 5 July 1841, Pedro II finally signed into law the statute approved by the Brazilian Parliament, recognizing Maria Amélia as a Brazilian princess.

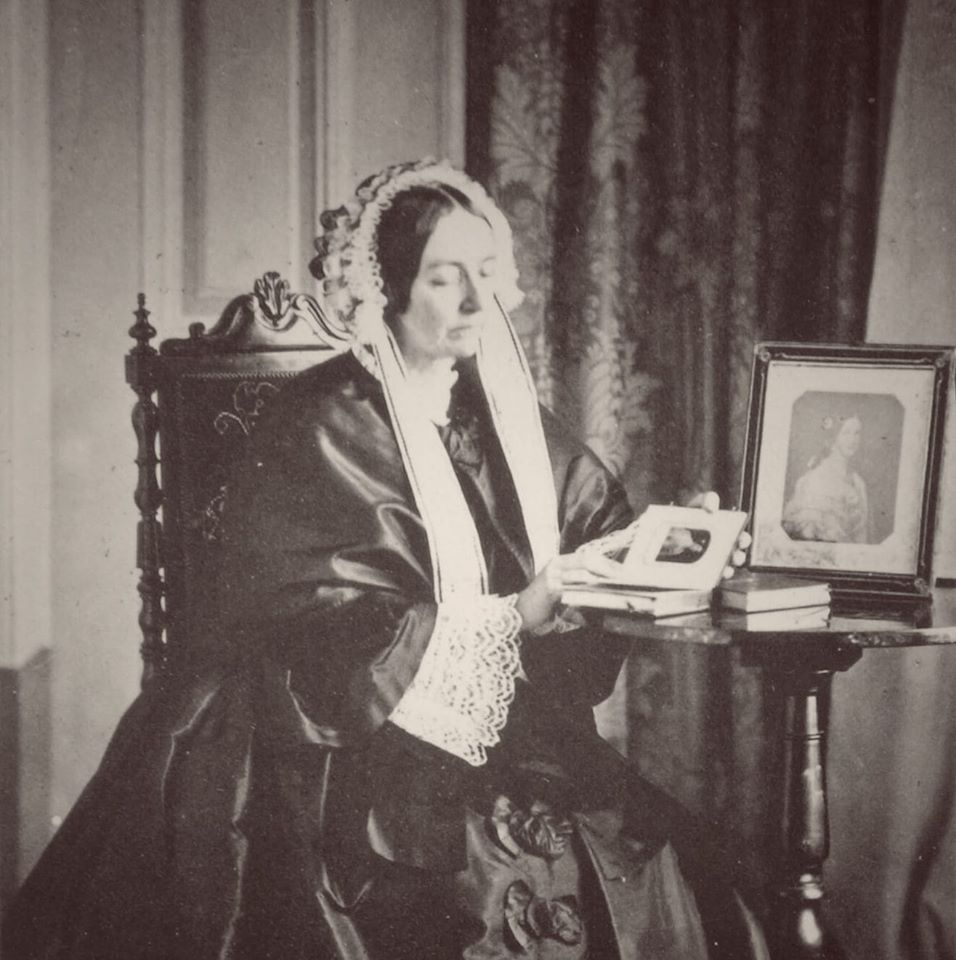
Photograph of Amélie by Francisco Augusto Gomes, 1861. She wore black for the rest of her life in mourning for her husband, brother, and daughter

Princess Maria Amélia became engaged to Archduke Maximilian of Austria (later Emperor Maximilian of Mexico) at the beginning of 1852, but shortly afterward began to show symptoms of tuberculosis. Because of the disease, she and her mother moved to Funchal, on Madeira Island, in search of healthier airs, arriving on 31 August 1852. Nonetheless, the princess died there of tuberculosis at the age of 22 on 4 February 1853. Her death profoundly affected her mother, who visited Maria Amélia's tomb every year on the anniversary of her death, and financed the construction of a still-extant hospital in Funchal named "Princesa Dona Maria Amélia", and left her properties in Bavaria to Archduke Maximilian, "whom [she] would have been happy to have as a son-in-law, if God had saved her beloved daughter Maria Amélia." After Maria Amélia's death, Amélie settled again in Lisbon.

=== Health issues, death, and burial ===
Amélie had suffered from angina pectoris since 1834, following her husband's death, and presented lesions on her lungs. By 1871, her health had severely deteriorated, a condition about which her stepson, Pedro II, was constantly informed. She suffered from fever, symptoms of bronchitis, and respiratory distress. She was even administered the last rites; however, her condition improved upon learning she would be visited by her sister, Queen Josephine of Sweden, and by Pedro II. By 1872, she presented edema in her lower extremities, dyspnea, and capillary bronchitis. Amélie died on 26 January 1873, at the age of 60, due to congestive heart failure. Her body was embalmed shortly after death. A statement was issued on 29 January:

The body of Her Majesty the Empress of Brazil was embalmed by Drs. Barral and Manuel Carlos Teixeira, with the executors and the Countess of Rio Maior, D. Isabel, attending this act. Before the body was enclosed in the lead coffin, Her Majesty was shown to the Marquises of Resende, the Viscounts of Almeida and of Aljezur, the ladies, and all the servants of her household.

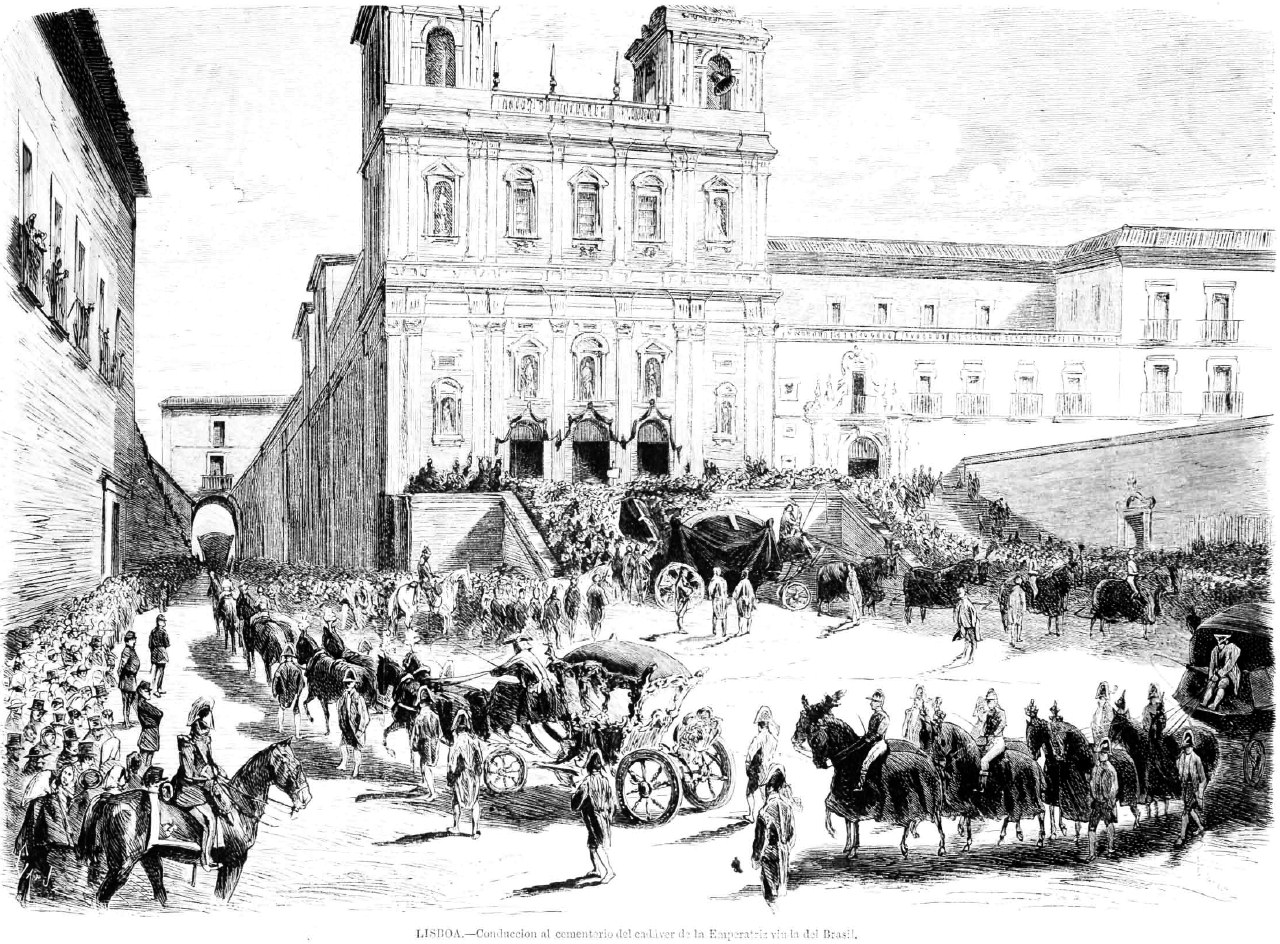
Arrival of the funeral procession of the empress at the Monastery of São Vicente de Fora in Lisbon

Amélie was interred in the Royal Pantheon of the House of Braganza in Lisbon. Under the terms of her last will and testament, her sister, Queen Josephine, was named her primary heir—inheriting, among other assets, the Braganza Tiara. However, many documents pertaining to Pedro I were bequeathed to Brazil and are currently held in the Imperial Museum's Historical Archive in Petrópolis. In 1982, her remains were repatriated to Brazil and then translated to the Imperial Crypt and Chapel in the Monument to the Independence of Brazil in São Paulo.

== Exhumation ==
In 2012, researchers from the University of São Paulo exhumed Amélie's remains alongside those of Pedro I and Maria Leopoldina. The investigation revealed that Amélie's body had undergone extensive preservation through mummification, with skin, hair, and internal organs remaining intact. Forensic examinations identified an incision in the jugular vein used to inject aromatic preservatives, such as camphor and myrrh, during the original 19th century embalming. Lead forensic archaeologist Valdirene Ambiel noted that the casket's hermetic seal further prevented decomposition by blocking microorganisms. Before reinterment, the body underwent a modern re-embalming process based on the original methods.

== Arms ==
Styles of Empress Amélia of Brazil
- Reference style: Her Imperial Majesty
- Spoken style: Your Imperial Majesty
- Alternative style: Madam

Coat of Arms of Amélie of Leuchtenberg as Empress of Brazil

== Ancestry ==
Ancestors of Amélie of Leuchtenberg

8. François de Beauharnais, marquis de La Ferté-Beauharnais
4. Alexandre, vicomte de Beauharnais
9. Henriette de Pyvart de Chastullé
2. Eugène, Duke of Leuchtenberg
10. Joseph Gaspard Tascher de la Pagerie
5. Joséphine Tascher de La Pagerie
11. Rose Claire des Vergers de Sannois
1. Amélie of Leuchtenberg
12. Frederick Michael, Count Palatine of Zweibrücken
6. Maximilian I Joseph of Bavaria
13. Countess Palatine Maria Franziska of Sulzbach
3. Princess Augusta of Bavaria
14. Prince George William of Hesse-Darmstadt
7. Princess Augusta Wilhelmine of Hesse-Darmstadt
15. Countess Maria Louise Albertine of Leiningen-Dagsburg-Falkenburg

== Descendants ==
With Dom Pedro I of Brazil, formerly also Pedro IV of Portugal:

- Princess Maria Amélia of Brazil (1 December 1831 – 4 February 1853)

== Cultural representations ==
Amélie of Leuchtenberg is the protagonist of a novel by Ivanir Calado, Imperatriz no Fim do Mundo: Memórias Dúbias de Amélia de Leuchtenberg ("Empress at the End of the World: Dubious Memoirs of Amélie of Leuchtenberg," 1997), and has been played on film and television by:

- Maria Cláudia, in the film "Independência ou Morte" ("Independence or Death", 1972)
- Cida Marques, in the miniseries "Entre o Amor e a Espada" ("Between Love and the Sword", 2001)
- Cláudia Abreu, in the miniseries "O Quinto dos Infernos" ("The Fifth Circle of Hell", 2002)

== Bibliography ==
- Torres, Lígia Lemos (1947). Imperatriz Dona Amélia (in Portuguese). São Paulo: Elvino Pocai.
- Rezzutti, Paulo (2015). D. Pedro: a história não contada: O homem revelado por cartas e documentos inéditos (in Portuguese). Leya. ISBN 9788577345830.

Amélie of Leuchtenberg House of Beauharnais Born: 31 June 1812 Died: 26 January 1873
Brazilian royalty
Vacant Title last held by Maria Leopoldina of Austria	Empress consort of Brazil; 2 August 1829 – 7 April 1831	Vacant Title next held by Teresa Cristina of the Two Sicilies
