= Princess Maria Amélia of Brazil =

Brazilian princess (1831–1853)

Princess Maria Amélia
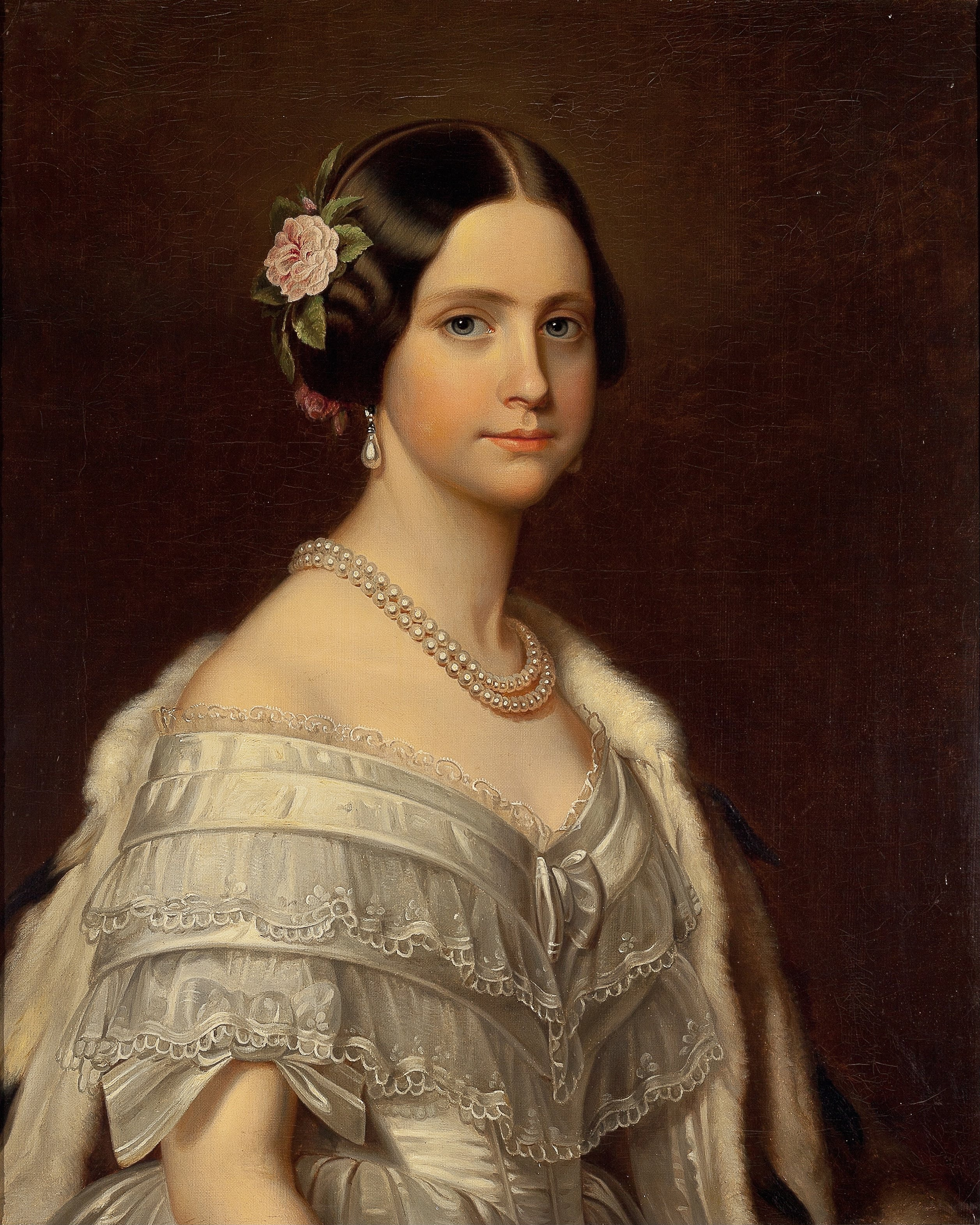
- Princess Dona Maria Amélia around age 17, c. 1849
- Born: 1 December 1831; Paris, France
- Died: 4 February 1853 (aged 21); Funchal, Portugal
- Burial: Convento de Santo Antônio (Convent of Saint Anthony), Rio de Janeiro, Brazil
Names
- Maria Amélia Augusta Eugênia Josefina Luísa Teodolinda Elói Francisco Xavier de Paula Gabriela Rafaela Gonzaga
- House: Braganza
- Father: Pedro I of Brazil
- Mother: Amélie of Leuchtenberg
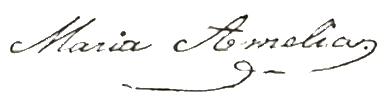
- Signature

Dona Maria Amélia (1 December 1831 – 4 February 1853) was a princess of the Empire of Brazil and a member of the Brazilian branch of the House of Braganza. Her parents were Emperor Pedro I, the first ruler of Brazil, and Amélie of Leuchtenberg. The only child of her father's second marriage, Maria Amélia was born in France after Pedro I abdicated the Brazilian throne in favor of his son Dom Pedro II. Before Maria Amélia was a month old, Pedro I went to Portugal to restore the crown of the eldest daughter of his first marriage, Dona Maria II. He fought a successful war against his brother Miguel I, who had usurped Maria II's throne.

Only a few months after his victory, Pedro I died from tuberculosis. Maria Amélia's mother took her to Portugal, where she remained for most of her life without ever visiting Brazil. The Brazilian government refused to recognize Maria Amélia as a member of Brazil's Imperial House because she was foreign-born, but when her elder half-brother Pedro II was declared of age in 1840, he successfully intervened on her behalf.

Maria Amélia became engaged to Archduke Maximilian of Austria in early 1852, but before the marriage could take place she contracted tuberculosis, and was taken to the town of Funchal on the Portuguese island of Madeira. Despite its reputedly healthy climate, her health continued to deteriorate, and she died on 4 February 1853. Her body was taken to mainland Portugal and interred in the Pantheon of the House of Braganza; almost 130 years later, her remains were taken to Brazil. In honor of her daughter, Maria Amélia's mother financed the construction of the "Princesa D. Maria Amélia" hospital in Funchal. Maria Amélia's fiancé, Maximilian, made a pilgrimage to Brazil and Madeira, a journey that influenced his acceptance of the throne of Mexico in 1864.

== Early life ==
=== Birth ===
Maria Amélia was born on 1 December 1831 in Paris and christened Maria Amélia Augusta Eugênia Josefina Luísa Teodolinda Elói Francisco Xavier de Paula Gabriela Rafaela Gonzaga. (Note: There is some confusion over Maria Amélia's full name. Her birth certificate dated 1 December 1831 says that she was named Maria Amélia Augusta Eugênia Josefina Luísa Teodolinda Elói Francisco Xavier de Paula Gabriela Rafaela Gonzaga (Almeida 1973, p. 45; Sousa 1972, p. 187). Her parents seems to have changed their mind and Maria Amélia was renamed Maria Amélia Augusta Eugênia Josefina Luísa Teodolinda Francisca Xavier de Paula Gabriela Rafaela Gonzaga according to her baptism certificate of 20 December 1831 (Almeida 1973, p. 47). Thus the name Elói was removed and the male Francisco was changed to its female form, Francisca. To further complicate the matter, there are a few later authors, such as Max Fleiuss (Fleiuss 1940, p. 11) and Lígia Lemos Torres (Torres 1947, p. 145), who misspelled her name, writing Heloísa instead of Elói.) She was the only daughter of Dom Pedro, Duke of Braganza, and his second wife Amélie of Leuchtenberg. Through her father, Maria Amélia was a member of the Brazilian branch of the House of Braganza (Portuguese: Bragança), and was referred to by the honorific Dona (Lady) from birth. She was the granddaughter of the Portuguese King João VI. Maria Amélia's mother was the daughter of Eugène de Beauharnais, Duke of Leuchtenberg. Eugène's stepfather was Napoleon Bonaparte, Emperor of France. Eugène was married to Princess Augusta, eldest daughter of King Maximilian I of Bavaria.

Pedro had formerly been the first Emperor of Brazil, as Pedro I, and also King of Portugal, as Pedro IV. He was succeeded on the Portuguese throne by his eldest daughter, Maria II, Maria Amélia's elder half-sister. The young Queen was the child of Pedro's first marriage to Maria Leopoldina of Austria. In 1828, Maria II's crown was usurped by Dom Miguel I, Pedro's younger brother. Eager to restore his daughter to her throne, Pedro abdicated the Brazilian crown in April 1831 and departed for Europe with Amélie, who was pregnant with Maria Amélia.

To acknowledge Maria Amélia's rights as a Brazilian princess, Pedro invited several guests to observe her birth, including the Brazilian diplomatic envoy to France. The newborn's godparents were King Louis Philippe I of France and his consort Maria Amalia of Naples and Sicily, after whom she was named. Pedro sent a letter to his children who had remained in Brazil—including his son, child-emperor Dom Pedro II—with the message: "Divine Providence wanted to lessen the sorrow that my paternal heart feels in the separation from Y.I.M. [Your Imperial Majesty], giving me one more Daughter, and to Y.I.M., one more sister and subject".

=== Brazilian princess ===
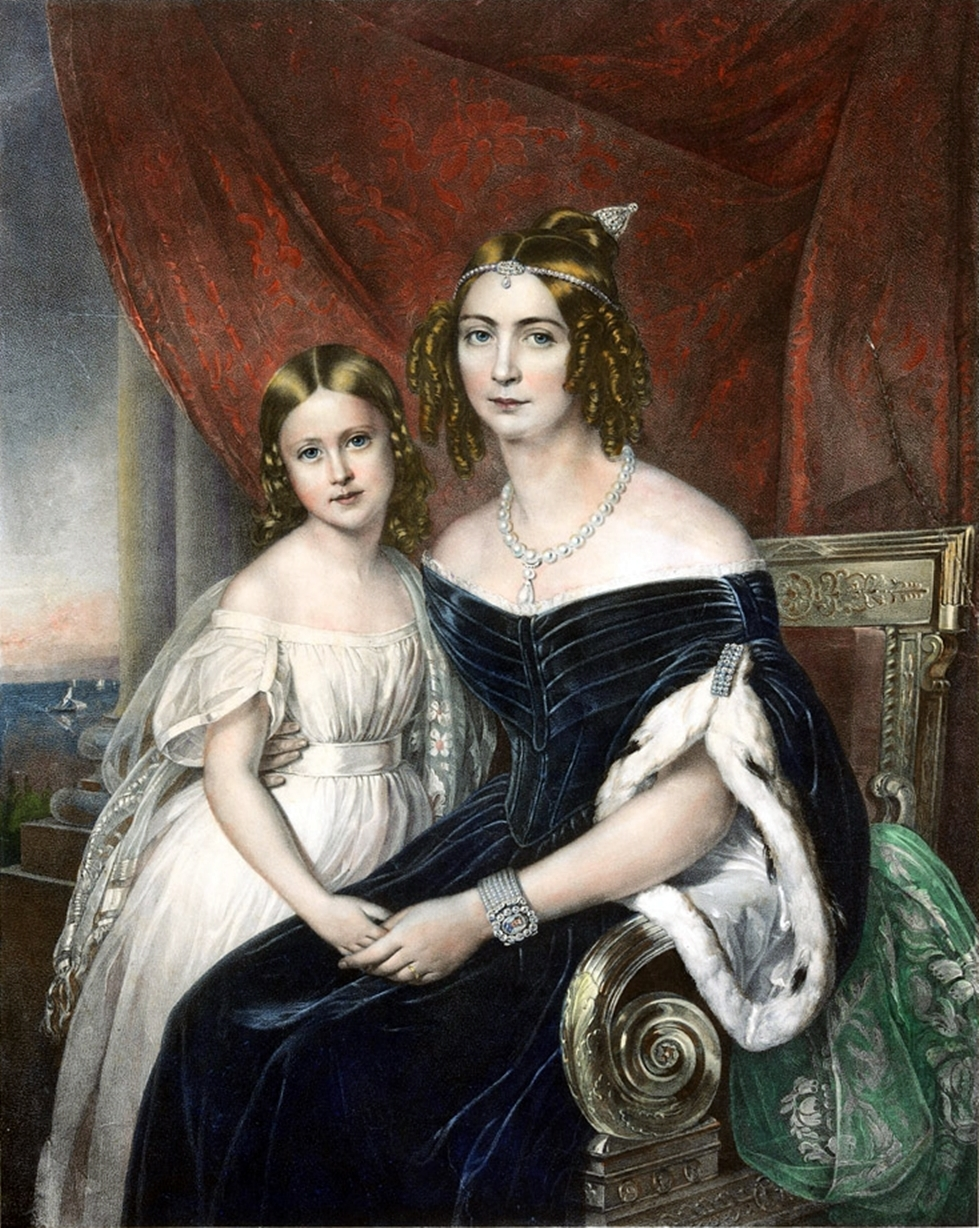
Maria Amélia with her mother, c. 1840

When Maria Amélia was only 20 days old, her father departed France to invade Portugal. For almost two years, she lived in Paris with her mother and half-sister Maria II. When news arrived that the Portuguese capital, Lisbon, had fallen to Pedro's forces, Amélie of Leuchtenberg left Paris with her infant daughter and stepdaughter for Portugal. They arrived in Lisbon on 22 September 1833 and disembarked the next day. Charles John Napier, a British naval officer who had fought alongside Pedro, wrote about the emotional reunion:

I never saw [Pedro] so happy and pleased; he went onboard just a little above Belém; he was received at the ladder by the empress [Amélie] who hugged and kissed him with the greatest affection: the queen [Maria II] was very moved and could not hold her tears. The little Princess [Maria] Amélia, his youngest daughter, took much of his attention: she became somewhat scared of seeing his bushy beard and did not warm to his caresses.

With Miguel I defeated and in exile, and Maria II restored to the throne, Maria Amélia and her family remained in Portugal, first residing in Ramalhão Palace, and later in the Royal Palace of Queluz near Lisbon. But the war had taken its toll on Pedro's health, and he was dying of tuberculosis. Maria Amélia, who was not yet three years old, was taken during the early hours of 24 September 1834 to Pedro's deathbed. Very weak, Pedro raised his hands to bless her and said: "Always tell this child of the father who loved her so dearly ... not to forget me ... always to obey her mother ... those are my last wishes". Pedro died in the early afternoon of the same day.

The widowed Amélie never remarried, and spent her time overseeing her daughter's upbringing in Portugal, where they remained despite not being members of the Portuguese Royal Family, though closely related. Neither Amélie nor her daughter ever visited Brazil, but Amélie unsuccessfully petitioned the Brazilian government to recognize her daughter as a member of Brazil's Imperial Family, which would have entitled her to an income. Maria Amélia's half-brother Pedro II was a minor, and the government of Brazil was in the hands of a precarious regency. The government refused to acknowledge Maria Amélia as a Brazilian princess owing to her foreign birth, and forbade both her and her mother from setting foot in Brazil. The situation would only change after Pedro II was declared of age in 1840 and was in a position to insist that she be recognized as a member of his household. Aureliano Coutinho (later Viscount of Sepetiba), the Minister of Foreign Affairs, requested the Brazilian parliament to grant Maria Amélia recognition, which occurred on 5 July 1841.

=== Education and engagement ===
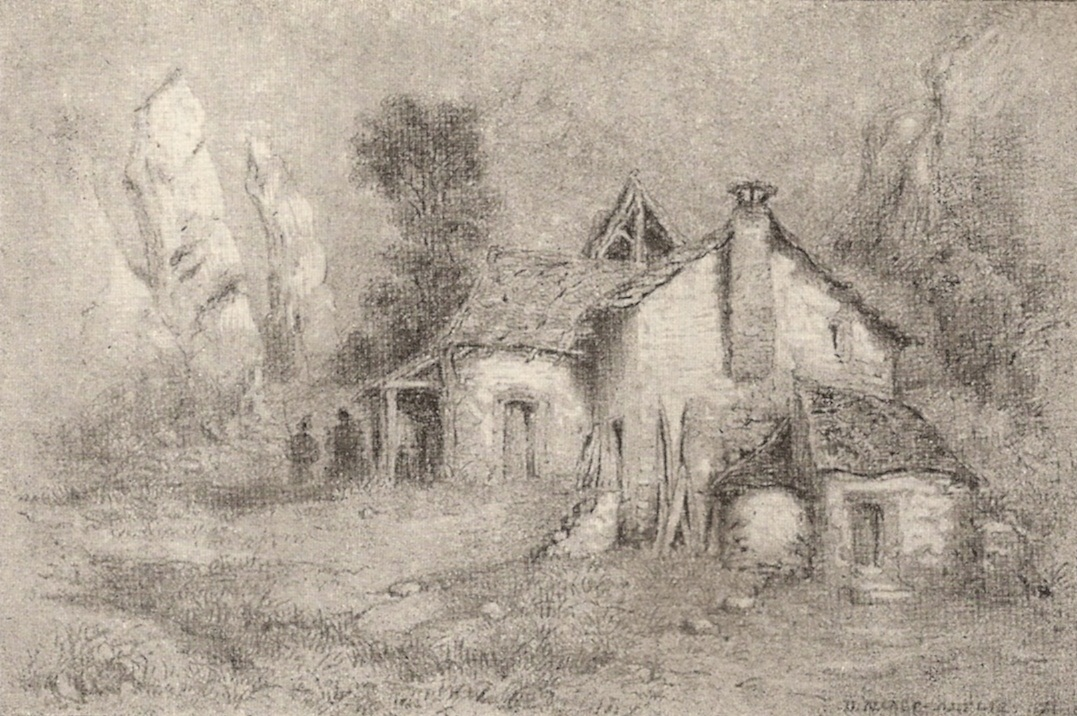
A drawing made by Maria Amélia

With the purpose of refining her education, Maria Amélia moved with her mother in the middle 1840s to Munich, capital of Bavaria, where many of her relatives lived. A dedicated student, she was given classes that encompassed a broad array of subjects that included rhetoric, philosophy, history, geography, German literature, mathematics and physics. She learned to speak and write not only in Portuguese, but also in English, French and German. She became highly skilled in drawing, painting and playing the piano. An intelligent young woman with a fiery temper and shrewd mind, Maria Amélia was described by a teacher as having, "without knowing, an exceptional talent for dialectic, an ability that would make the fortune of a young law student."

The memory of her father apparently motivated Maria Amélia's dedication to her education. The late Duke of Braganza cast a large shadow in her life, and was always remembered by his daughter, who would often ask the people around her: "and my father, who looks at me from heaven, shall he be pleased with his daughter?" She was never quite able to cope with her father's death and it deeply touched her. Maria Amélia remarked after she saw a garden where Pedro planted a sycamore:

A profound sadness invaded me when contemplating these trees, which had survived my father and probably shall survive all of us. It is an image of human fragility. Man is the most frail of all beings; he dies, while the objects which were seemingly created for his use, endure the centuries! ... But I am digressing in my melancholic reflections.

At the end of 1850 Maria Amélia and her mother returned to Portugal, and settled in the Janelas Verdes palace. In early 1852, her cousin the Austrian Archduke Maximilian, then serving in the Austrian navy and on a stopover in Portugal, paid a visit to her. Maximilian's mother was the younger half-sister of Maria Amélia's maternal grandmother, and both women were members of the House of Wittelsbach from Bavaria. He was also related to Maria Amélia's older half-siblings, as his father was the younger brother of Brazilian Empress Leopoldina. They had met previously at a family reunion in Munich in 1838, when they were only children. In this second meeting, however, they fell in love. Maximilian was enthralled by Maria Amélia, a kind young woman with blue eyes and blonde hair "of striking beauty as well as cultivated intelligence". They were betrothed, but the engagement was never made official as a result of her early death.

== Later years ==
=== Death ===
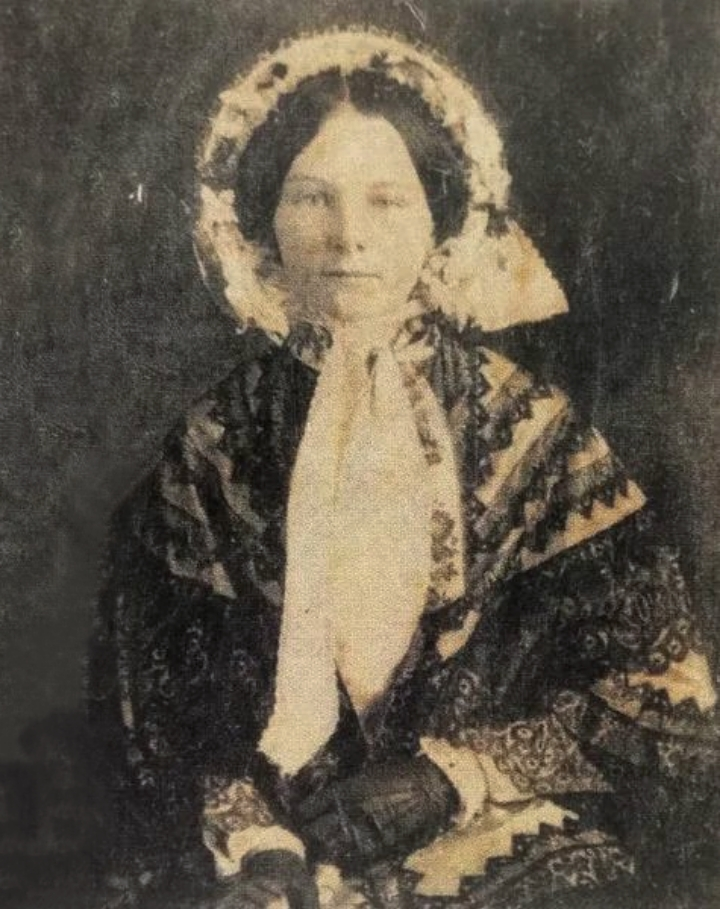
Maria Amélia, aged 19

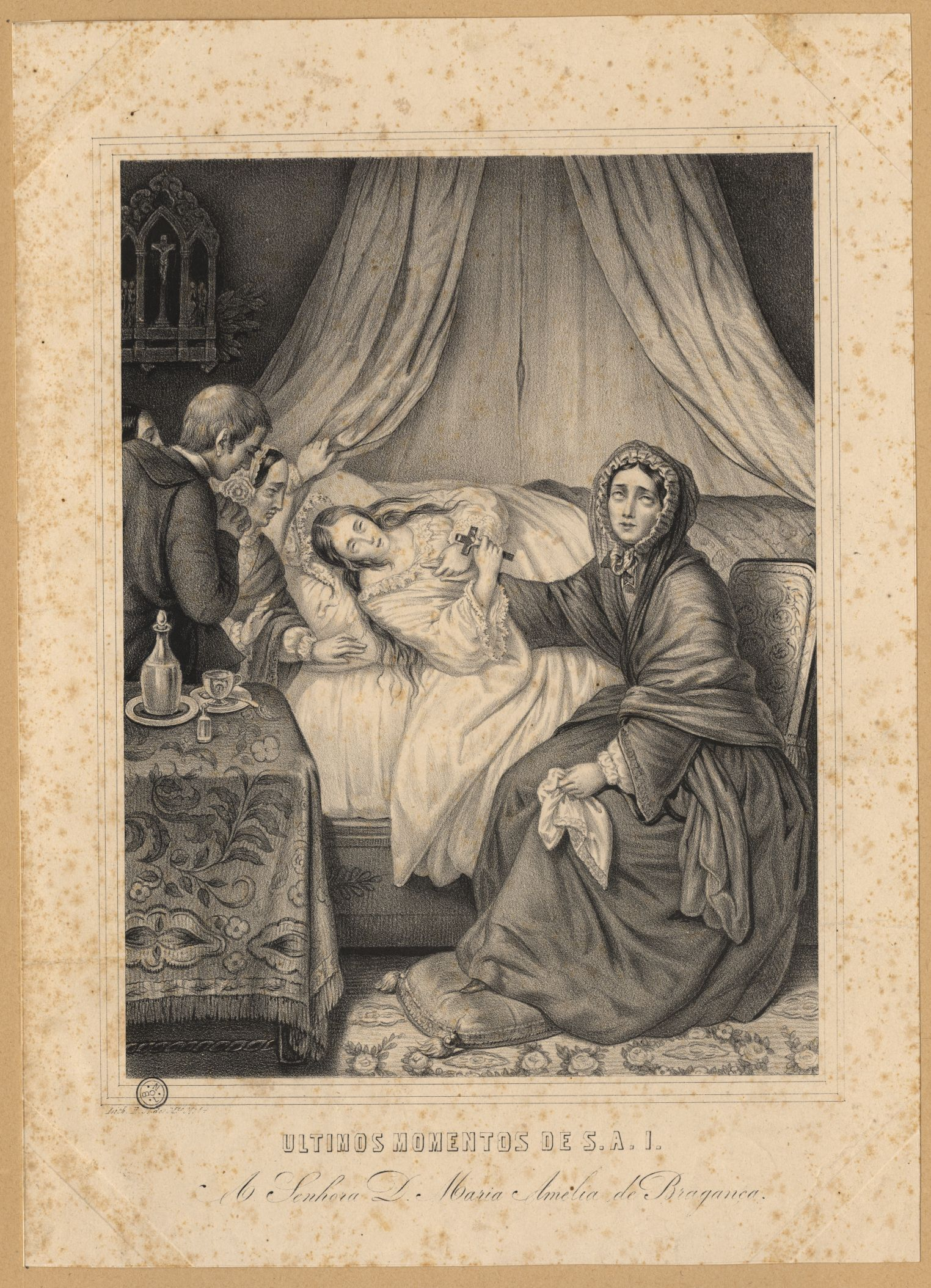
Maria Amélia's last moments with her mother at the bedside

In February 1852, Maria Amélia contracted scarlet fever. As the months passed, she did not recover and developed a persistent cough, the onset of tuberculosis. On 26 August, the princess departed from the Janelas Verdes palace, where she lived, and traveled to the island of Madeira. The island's climate had a salutary reputation, as Maria Amélia noted: "the fevers disappear, they say, as if by magic!"

Maria Amélia and her mother, who had accompanied her, disembarked on 31 August in Funchal, the capital of Madeira. The entire town greeted her joyfully, and a crowd followed the princess to her new home. She adored the island and told her mother: "If I one day recover my previous robust health, isn't that so mommy, we will stay a long time in this island. We will make long excursions in the mountains, we will find new paths, just as we did in Stein!" But her health worsened, and by the end of November, all hope was gone. By the beginning of 1853, the princess was bedridden, and she knew death was approaching: "My strength diminishes from day to day; I can feel it ... we are reaching the beginning of the end." A little after midnight in the early hours of 4 February, a priest administered the last rites. Maria Amélia tried to comfort her mother: "Do not cry ... let God's will be done; may He come to my aid in my last hour; may He console my poor mother!" She died later that morning at around 04:00.

The princess's body remained in a chapel next to the house where she died until it was taken back to the Portuguese mainland on 7 May 1853. On 12 May, the coffin was disembarked at Lisbon, and a grandiose funeral followed. Her remains were interred next to her father's in the Braganza Pantheon, located in the Monastery of São Vicente de Fora. Almost 130 years later, in 1982, Maria Amélia's remains were carried to Brazil and placed in the Convento de Santo Antônio (Convent of Saint Anthony) in Rio de Janeiro, where other Brazilian royals are interred.

=== Legacy ===
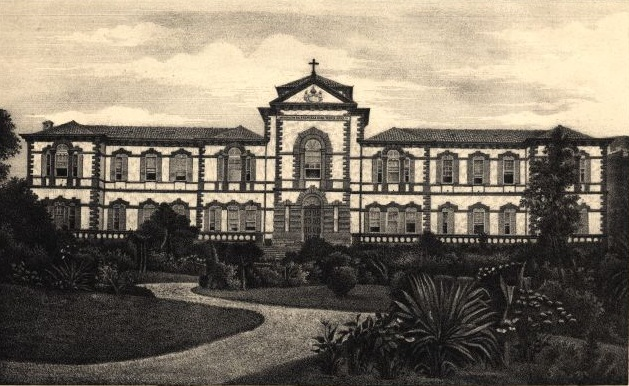
Princesa D. Maria Amélia Hospital

Emperor Pedro II had never met his younger sister in person, but had developed a strong relationship with her through her letters. He wrote in his journal seven years after her death: "I heard the mass for my sister [Maria] Amélia with whom I was so close and feel so sorry for never having met." Amélie visited her daughter's tomb every 4 February until her own death, and financed the construction of a hospital in Funchal called "Princesa D. Maria Amélia" in her daughter's honor; the hospital is still in existence. Amélie bequeathed her properties in Bavaria to Archduke Maximilian, "whom [she] would [have felt] happy having as a son-in-law, had God conserved [her] beloved daughter Maria Amélia". (Note: Maximilian died in 1867, six years before Amélie. Her will disposed that if Maximilian had died without children, her properties would go to her nephew Nicholas, son of Maximilian de Beauharnais, 3rd Duke of Leuchtenberg. See Almeida 1973, p. 152.)

Archduke Maximilian was haunted by the memory of Maria Amélia, and after his marriage to Charlotte of Belgium he made a pilgrimage in 1859–60 to locations connected to his ex-fiancée. Upon reaching the island of Madeira, he wrote: "Here died, of tuberculosis, on 4 February 1853, the only daughter of the Empress of Brazil, an extraordinarily gifted creature. She left this flawed world, pure as an angel who returns to Heaven, her true native land."

Maximilian visited the hospital in Funchal that bore Maria Amélia's name, and until his death financed the maintenance of a double hospital room there. He also donated a statue of Our Lady of Sorrows in memory of Maria Amélia. Next he visited the house (called Quinta das Angústias, or Anguished Villa) where she died; he wrote: "for a long time I stood silent amidst thoughts of sorrow and longing under the shadow of a magnificent tree that enfolds and protects the house where the angel, so bitterly wept for, ceased to exist". In his memoirs, Maximilian also mentioned the island of Madeira, where "the life [was] extinguished that seemed destined to guarantee my own tranquil happiness".

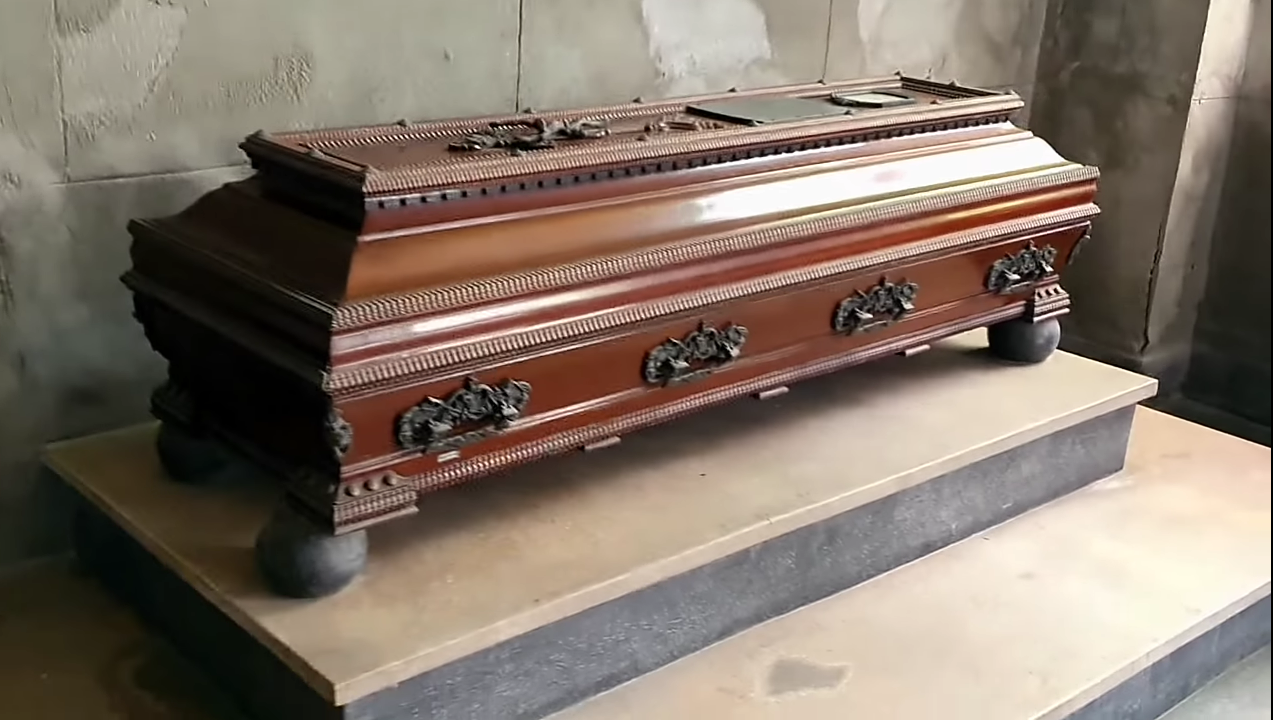
Maria Amélia's casket in the Convent of Saint Anthony in Rio de Janeiro, Brazil

Following his arrival in Brazil on 11 January 1860 Maximilian became fascinated by the country, the only concurrent monarchy in South America, and then under the rule of his deceased fiancée's elder brother. Inspired by the stability and prosperity he saw there, on 10 April 1864 he agreed to become emperor of the newly resuscitated Mexican Empire, believing he could achieve the same results in Mexico. But instead, after fighting between Mexican conservatives and liberals, Maximilian was executed on 19 June 1867, after being captured by Juaristas. In a last homage to Maria Amélia, as he was stripped of his belongings to face a firing squad, Maximilian asked that the small medallion of the Blessed Virgin Mary she had given to him, and which he wore around his neck, be sent to her mother. While Maria Amélia's life had little effect on events in either Brazil or Portugal, her death had significant, if indirect, repercussions on the history of Mexico. (Note: The death of Maria Amélia created the need in Maximilian to relieve his "troubled soul" (Longo 2008, p. 107) resulting in his tour of places associated with the princess. The search for links to Maria Amélia eventually took him to Brazil, where he began to conceive a purpose for his empty life, and this in turn prompted his later acceptance of the Mexican crown with tragic results (Longo 2008, p. 107; Calmon 1975, p. 631). According to historian Pedro Calmon, Maximilian called Pedro II "tutor" and regarded him as an "example". Maximilian told his Brazilian cousin that whatever good he had done for Mexico had been a result of what he learned from Pedro II and Brazil on his 1860 trip (Calmon 1975, p. 755).)

== Titles and honors ==
Styles of Maria Amélia, Princess of Brazil
- Reference style: Her Highness
- Spoken style: Your Highness
- Alternative style: Madam

=== Titles and styles ===
- 1 December 1831 – 4 February 1853: Her Highness The Princess Dona Maria Amélia of Brazil

=== Honors ===
Princess Maria Amélia was a recipient of the following Brazilian Orders:

- Grand Cross of the Order of Pedro I.
- Grand Cross of the Order of the Rose.

She was a recipient of the following foreign honors:

- Royal Order of Noble Ladies of Queen Maria Luisa.
- Grand Cross of the Portuguese Order of the Immaculate Conception of Vila Viçosa.
- Grand Cross of the Portuguese Order of Saint Isabel.
- Insignia of the Austrian Order of the Starry Cross.
- Insignia of the Bavarian Order of Saint Elizabeth.

== Ancestry ==
Ancestors of Princess Maria Amélia of Brazil

8. Peter III of Portugal
4. John VI of Portugal and Brazil
9. Maria I of Portugal and Brazil
2. Pedro I of Brazil and IV of Portugal
10. Charles IV of Spain
5. Carlota Joaquina of Spain
11. Maria Luisa of Parma
1. Princess Maria Amélia of Brazil
12. Alexandre, Viscount of Beauharnais
6. Eugène, Duke of Leuchtenberg
13. Joséphine Tascher de la Pagerie
3. Amélie of Leuchtenberg
14. Maximilian I Joseph of Bavaria
7. Princess Augusta of Bavaria
15. Princess Augusta Wilhelmine of Hesse-Darmstadt

== Bibliography ==
- Almeida, Sylvia Lacerda Martins de (1973). Uma filha de D. Pedro I: Dona Maria Amélia (in Portuguese). São Paulo: Companhia Editora Nacional. OCLC 633948363.
- Barman, Roderick J. (1999). Citizen Emperor: Pedro II and the Making of Brazil, 1825–1891. Stanford, California: Stanford University Press. ISBN 978-0-8047-3510-0.
- Calmon, Pedro (1950). O Rei Cavaleiro (in Portuguese) (6 ed.). São Paulo, São Paulo: Edição Saraiva.
- Calmon, Pedro (1975). História de D. Pedro II (in Portuguese). Vol. 5. Rio de Janeiro: José Olympio. OCLC 3577729.
- Fleiuss, Max (1940). Dom Pedro Segundo (in Portuguese). Rio de Janeiro: Imprensa Nacional.
- "História: Mausoléu Imperial" [History: Imperial Mausoleum]. Santuário e Convento de Santo Antônio (in Portuguese). Rio de Janeiro: Província Franciscana da Imaculada Conceição do Brasil. 2010. Archived from the original on 6 July 2011.
- Haslip, Joan (1971). The Crown of Mexico: Maximilian and His Empress Carlota. New York, New York: Holt, Rinehart and Winston. ISBN 978-0-03-086572-5.
- Hyde, H. Montgomery (1946). Mexican Empire: the history of Maximilian and Carlota of Mexico. London: Macmillan & Co.
- Laemmert, Eduardo (1849). Almanak Administrativo, Mercantil e Industrial (Almanaque Laemmert) (in Portuguese). Rio de Janeiro: Eduardo e Henrique Laemmert & C.
- Laemmert, Eduardo (1853). Almanak Administrativo, Mercantil e Industrial (Almanaque Laemmert) (in Portuguese). Rio de Janeiro: Eduardo e Henrique Laemmert & C.
- Longo, James McMurtry (2008). Isabel Orleans-Bragança: The Brazilian Princess Who Freed the Slaves. Jefferson, North Carolina: McFarland & Company. ISBN 978-0-7864-3201-1.
- Lira, Heitor (1977) [1938]. História de Dom Pedro II (1825–1891): Ascenção (1825–1870) (in Portuguese). Vol. 1. Belo Horizonte: Itatiaia. OCLC 163324850.
- Morato, Francisco de Aragão (1835). Memória sobre a soccessão da coroa de Portugal, no caso de não haver descendentes de Sua Magestade Fidelíssima a rainha D. Maria II (in Portuguese). Lisbon: Typographia de Firmin Didot.
- Schmidt, Maria Junqueira (1927). Amelia de Leuchtenberg: A segunda imperatriz do Brasil (in Portuguese). São Paulo: Companhia Melhoramento de São Paulo.
- Sousa, Octávio Tarquínio de (1972) [1954]. A vida de D. Pedro I (in Portuguese). Vol. 3. Rio de Janeiro: José Olympio. OCLC 634896259.
- Torres, Lígia Lemos (1947). Imperatriz Dona Amélia (in Portuguese). São Paulo: Elvino Pocai.
