= Ana Romana de Aragão Calmon =

Brazilian noble (1784–1862)

- First Baroness and Countess of Itapagipe
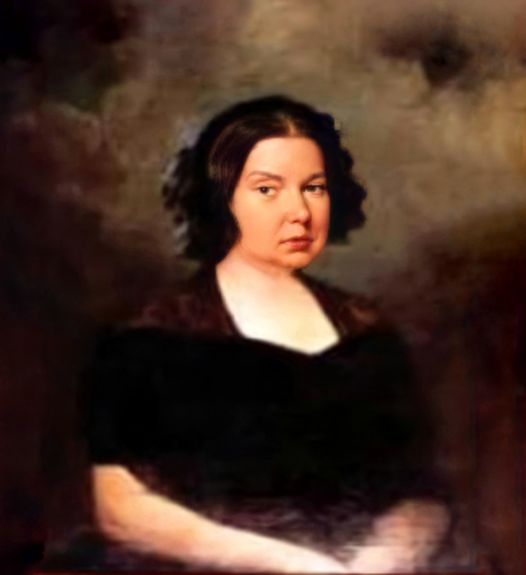
- Born: August 9, 1784; Bahia, Brazil
- Died: November 10, 1862 (aged 78); Rio de Janeiro, Brazil
- Spouse: Francisco Xavier da Silva Cabral
- Father: José Góis de Sequeira
- Mother: Luísa Antônia Calmon du Pin e Almeida

Ana Romana de Aragão Calmon, first Baroness and Countess of Itapagipe (August 9, 1784 – November 10, 1862), was a member of the Brazilian nobility who carried out various palace functions, including lady of the palace, head chamberlain to the empress and lady chamberlain to the imperial princess of Brazil. She also accompanied the future Maria II of Portugal on her first trip to Portugal.

== Biography ==
Calmon was born on August 9, 1784 in Bahia. Her parents were José Góis de Sequeira and Luísa Antônia Calmon du Pin e Almeida. She married on November 5, 1800, in the chapel of São Gonçalo do Camoroji, Salvador, with the fidalgo Francisco Xavier da Silva Cabral, counselor and judge of the Kingdom of Portugal. She died in Rio de Janeiro, on November 10, 1862.

== Titles ==
Emperor Pedro I of Brazil granted her a barony which was created by decree on December 12, 1825, and the county by decree of October 12, 1826. Her title had a toponymic origin, being taken from a stream in Bahia.
