= Ramalhão Palace =

Neoclassical palace in Sintra, Portugal

Coordinates: 38.785908°N 9.373101°W

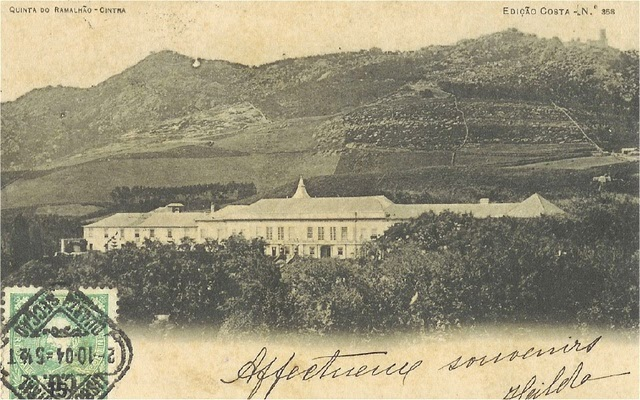
A view of Ramalhão Palace at the turn of the 19th/20th centuries.

The Palace of Ramalhão is a neoclassical Palace in Sintra, Portugal. The palace has its origins in a small farm that was enlarged into a palace by Luis Garcia de Bivar in 1470. It was at this palace where Queen Carlota Joaquina frequently stayed after 1802, and where she was exiled after refusing to swear to the Portuguese Constitution of 1822. The building is decorated in the Louis XVI style. The palace interior includes exotic frescos attributed to the painter Manuel da Costa, one of the decorators of the Palace of Queluz.

== See also ==
- Carlota Joaquina of Spain
- Sintra

== Sources ==
- (Portuguese) Palácio e Quinta do Ramalhão
