= Château de Poncin =

Residence in Poncin, Ain, France

Coordinates: 46°05′13″N 2°24′38″E

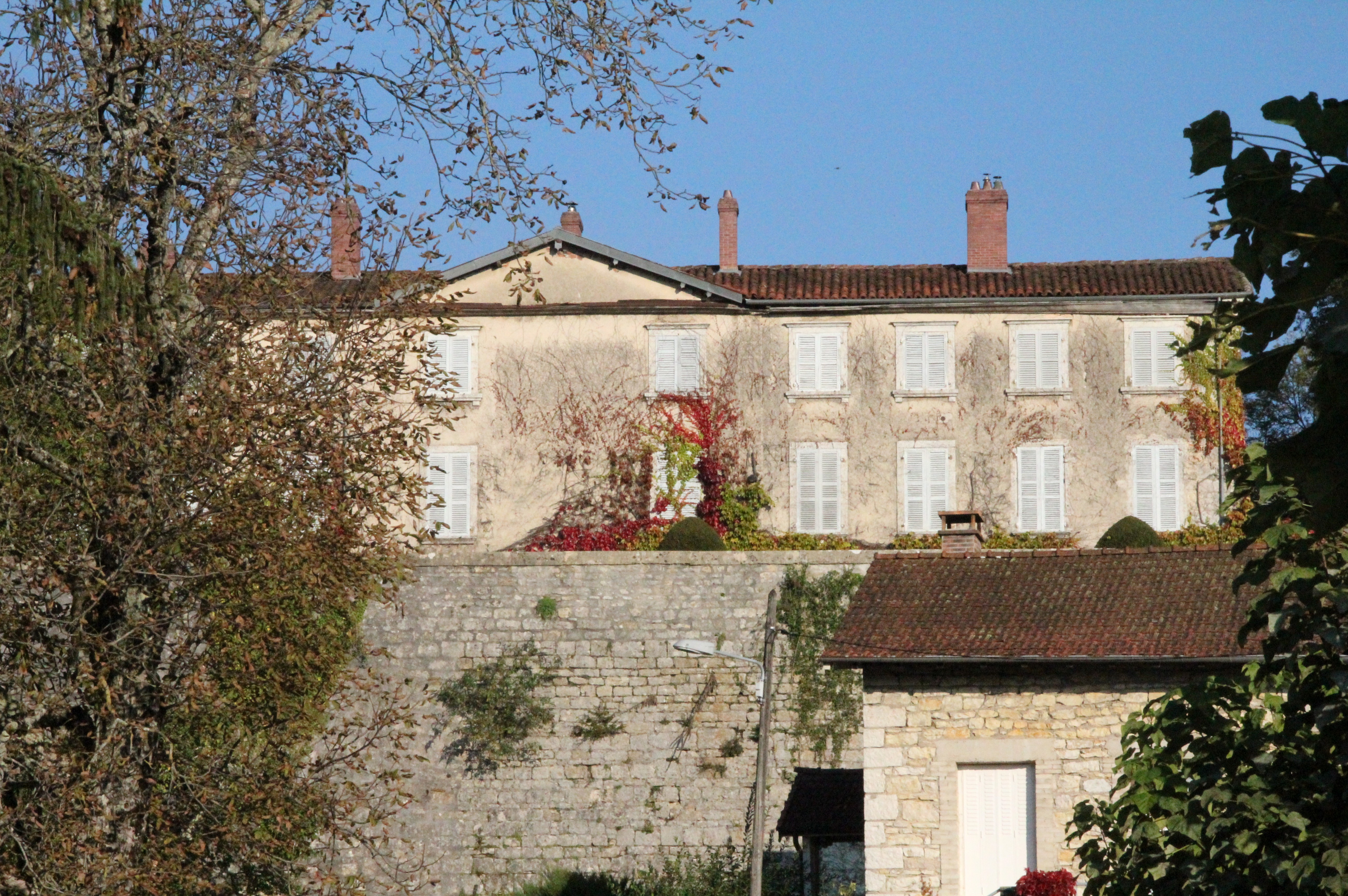
View of modern Château de Poncin today

The Château de Poncin is a former castle, now a stately residence, in the commune of Poncin in the Ain département of France. The present château on the site was constructed from the mid-18th century; parts of the original castle remain.

== History ==
Humbert II de Thoire built the castle at Poncin in 1180. It was one of the favourite residences of the lords of Thoire-Villars, who kept their court of accounts there. In 1290, it was rebuilt by Humbert IV de Thoire. On 19 October 1308, Humbert V, lord of Thoire and Villars, had it entirely remodelled and sold it, for 7,500 livres viennoises, in suzerainty to the lord de la Tour du Pin, Jean II de Viennois, dauphin of Viennois who returned it to him in fief lige. The rights passed in turn to the Counts of Savoy, recognised by acts of 16 October 1375 and 7 February 1385.

On 29 October 1402, Humbert VII, last of the lords of Thoire-Villars, "heavy with years and troubles", sold the seigneurie of Poncin to Amadeus VIII, Duke of Savoy, along with all of his lands in Bresse and Bugey, keeping the use of them until his death, which came on 7 May 1423. The castle stayed with the House of Savoy for a century and a half.

Poncin was forsaken by the Dukes of Savoy, who seldom went there. It was, among others, included in the dowery of Anne of Cyprus, widow of Louis, Duke of Savoy, and in that of Claudine de Bretagne, Viscountess de Bridiers (La Souterraine), widow of the Philip II, Duke of Savoy, dowager of Annecy, Châteauneuf in Valromey (Songieu), Poncin and Cerdon, who made a residence of it for a time.

In April 1513,Charles III, Duke of Savoy included it, with Cerdon and some other territories in Bugey, in the dowry of Philiberte de Savoie, his sister, Marquise of Gex and Fossan (Fossano), wife of Giuliano de' Medici, Duke of Nemours, Marquis of Suriane (Soragna) and Chazene. She died in 1524 without children. Having made her brother her heir, Poncin reverted to Savoy.

On 7 November 1531, the lordship of Poncin and its castle, with that of Cerdon, was given to Charles de la Chambre, Baron of Meximieux and Sermoyer, in exchange for lands in Loyettes. On 18 September 1565, Emmanuel Philibert, Duke of Savoy, took de la Chambre's lands at Poncin and Cerdon in exchange for the lordships of Pérouges and Montréal, granting them in appanage to Philip, Duke of Nemours.

The Dukes of Nemour, throughout the 16th and 17th centuries, made important modifications to the castle. Their descendants retained ownership until the 18th century.

In 1601, the castle was entirely dismantled by Charles de Gontaut, duc de Biron, on the orders of King Henri IV. In 1717, the land was given to Artus-Joseph de la Poype-Saint-Jullin who partially reconstructed. Around 1750, it passed to the Quinson family. Gaspard Roch de Quinson, wanting to install gardens, restored the terrasses for this purpose in 1760. The Quinsons still owned it at the time of the French Revolution.

At the Revolution, the château was sacked and severely damaged. It remained abandoned for forty years, until a new mayor of Poncin, monsieur Jantet, bought it in 1831 to create a very beautiful English garden.

The château then became the property of Joseph Savarin de Marestan who had been named conseiller de la préfecture of l' Allier. he came from an old Bugey family, ennobled at the end of the 17th century, which had provided a succession of bodyguards and musketeers to the king and had, in 1815 been given the title Baron de Marestan.

The modern château is privately owned and not open to the public. It has been partially listed (façades and roof, remains of the ancient fortification, terrasses, supporting wall and gardens) since 1973 as a monument historique by the French Ministry of Culture.

== See also ==
- List of castles in France
