= Philiberta of Savoy =

House of Savoy member and Duchess of Nemours (1516 – 1524)

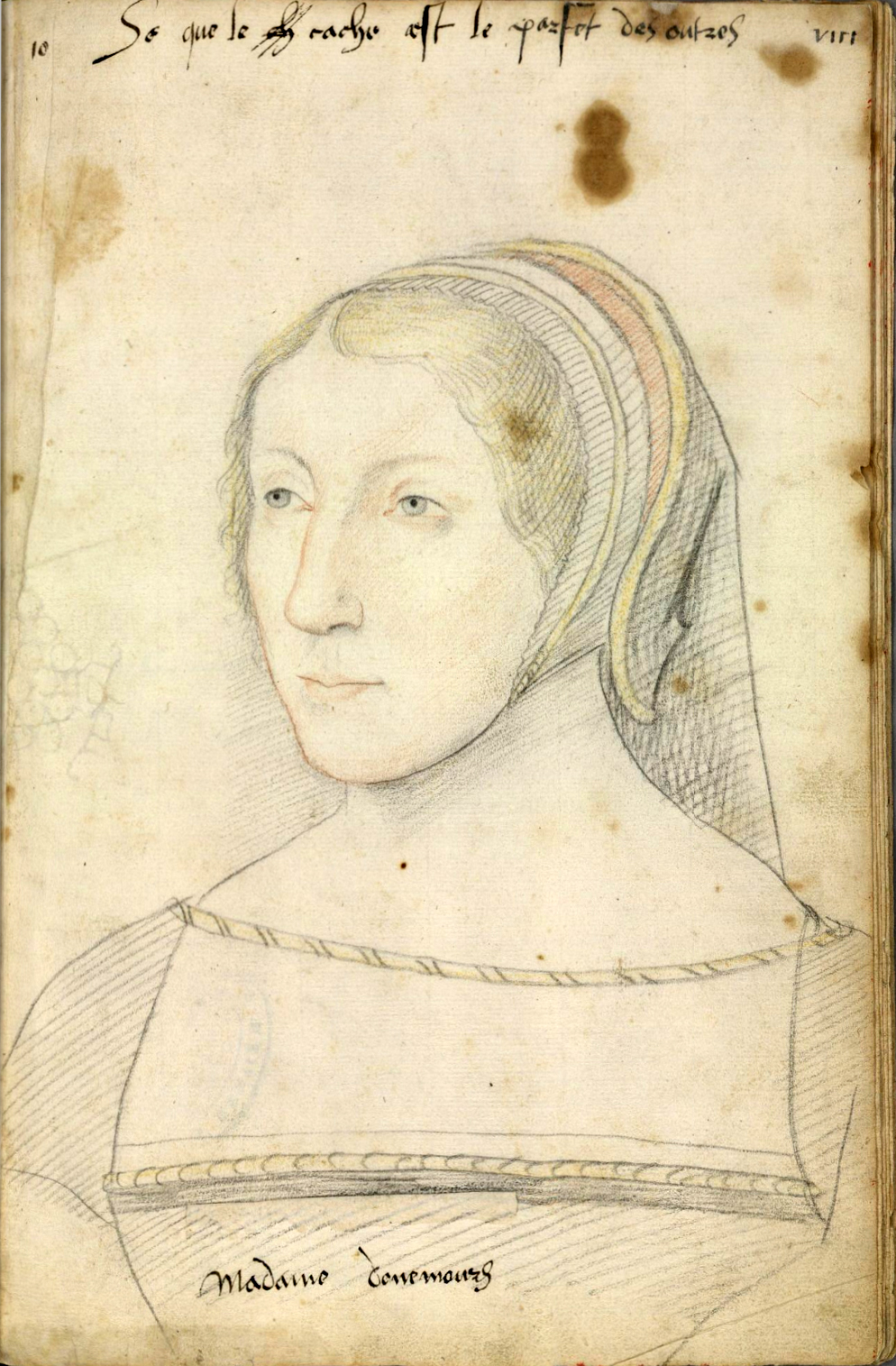
- Contemporary portrait by François Clouet.
- Born: 1498
- Died: April 4, 1524 (aged 25–26)
- Title: Duchess of Nemours
- Spouse: Giuliano de' Medici (1515–his death)
- Parents: Philip II, Duke of Savoy (father); Claudine de Brosse (mother)
- Family: House of Savoy

Philiberta of Savoy (or Filiberta; 1498 – April 4, 1524), Duchess of Nemours, was a Savoisian noblewoman and member of the House of Savoy.

== Early life and engagement ==
Philiberta was the daughter of Philip II, Duke of Savoy, and his second wife, Claudine de Brosse. After Philip died during Claudine's pregnancy, Claudine withdrew to Billiat to give birth to Philiberta. Claudine brought the Shroud of Turin with her into seclusion, then in possession of the House of Savoy, a relic that Philiberta would revere throughout her life.

Philiberta's elder half-sister, Louise of Savoy, was the mother of King Francis I of France. Philiberta was therefore Francis I's aunt, though she was four years his junior. In her youth, Philiberta was close to her mother, acting as a constant companion until Claudine's death in 1513.

=== Personality and appearance ===
Historian Jean-Henri Merle d'Aubigné assessed Philiberta to be an intelligent, albeit "simple-hearted" girl who engaged often in charity. Biographers Annie Turner Wittenmyer and Martha Walker Freer similarly described her as "modest" and of a "gentle" or "timid" disposition. She was also a devoted believer of the Catholic faith, which attracted several suitors before her eventual engagement.

Accounts differ on Philiberta's physical appearance. Some critics considered her a likely candidate as the inspiration for a painting that was attributed to Leonardo da Vinci: 'Holy Family with St Catherine' (today hosted at the Hermitage Museum). This painting was later identified as the work of Cesare da Sesto, da Vinci's contemporary. In a 1938 biography of da Vinci, Antonina Vallentin described Philiberta as a "thin girl with a pale, pinched face, and almost a hunchback," but referenced no source—coeval or otherwise—for this assessment. Contemporary portraits were made of Philiberta by artist François Clouet, who was generally recognised for his accuracy.

=== Engagement ===
In 1513, Philiberta was engaged to Italian nobleman Giuliano de' Medici. Giuliano committed to the marriage somewhat reluctantly: his brother, Pope Leo X, orchestrated the union to solidify an alliance with France. Philiberta's brother, Duke of Savoy Charles III, opposed the marriage, believing the House of Medici to be beneath that of Savoy. Giuliano's sister-in-law, Alfonsina Orsini, also opposed the union, on the grounds that Philiberta brought no dowry. The union proceeded nonetheless, largely due to the will of King Francis I, who viewed the union positively.

== Marriage ==
Philiberta and Giuliano did not marry until February 1515, when she was 17 years of age.

Francis invested Giuliano with the title of Duke of Nemours, which had recently reverted back to the French crown. Giuliano would not exercise the title, as he and Philiberta relocated to Rome shortly after marriage. Pope Leo X welcomed the couple with an extravagant reception, spending 150,000 ducats on festivities.

Giuliano had been ill with tuberculosis for some time, and his health began to deteriorate early in the marriage. Philiberta became his carer, attending to him for the final few months of his life. Within a year of marriage, Giuliano died aged 37; Philiberta was 18.

Though her marriage had been arranged, Philiberta sincerely grieved her husband. Nonetheless, because their marriage had not produced an heir, the Medici family was hostile to Philiberta, and she began considering how to secure her position outside of Italy.

== Duchess of Nemours ==
At the time of Giuliano's death in March 1516, the letters patent that would make him Duke of Nemours had not yet been registered by the Parlement of Paris, meaning Philiberta was not automatically ennobled as a duchess. When King Francis I ordered for Philiberta to receive the Duchy of Nemours, Parlement obliged reluctantly in April. Philiberta received the duchy, but only as a usufructary; she was also prohibited from deforesting the lands and collecting the full tax revenue yielded by Nemours. Philiberta subsequently petitioned her nephew to grant her the privileges she had been denied. When Francis agreed in June, Philiberta returned to France from Rome, though she rarely visited Nemours for the rest of her life.

To provide her with a purpose that might soothe her grief, Francis granted her the power to release prisoners she deemed worthy of clemency. To conduct this work, she travelled throughout France for a year, then settled at the royal court. Philiberta struggled to adjust to the busy, ostentatious environment, though she found comfort in the strong religious convictions of her niece, Marguerite de Navarre. The equally pious Philiberta came to rely on Marguerite's company, and the two women became close friends.

Philiberta would not remarry, though she was briefly courted in 1517 by Odet de Foix, Viscount of Lautrec. A leader in King Francis' military, de Foix sought to wed Philiberta to improve his position. Her brother Charles III, Duke of Savoy, discouraged de Foix from proposing, because he planned to orchestrate a marriage between Philiberta and the King of Portugal.

In June 1521, Philiberta left the court to attend the marriage of her brother Charles III to Beatrice of Portugal, intending to return to her childhood estates afterwards. She had tired of high society, finding it to be decadent, and was struggling to comply with the political manoeuvres expected of her by her brother and nephew. Furthermore, she had likely contracted tuberculosis, the same illness that had killed her husband, and her own health began to falter. Her departure was to the great personal disappointment of Marguerite.

== Later life ==
In the last few years of her life, Philiberta retreated increasingly into religious activities. She lived in relative isolation at a castle owned by the House of Savoy in Virieu-le-Grand, Bugey, travelling little, and devoted herself to helping the region's poor. Like Marguerite, she keenly followed the writings of Guillaume Briçonnet, Bishop of Meaux, and developed a fledgling interest in ideas underpinning the growing Reformation movement.

In 1523, Philiberta funded the construction of the Chapel of Nemours, a chapel on the grounds of the Château des ducs de Savoie. This chapel adjoined the Sainte-Chapelle, which housed the Shroud of Turin at the time.

== Death ==
Philiberta died on April 4, 1524 in Virieu-le-Grand, aged 26, likely a result of complications related to tuberculosis. The Duchy of Nemours reverted to the French crown upon her passing.

Her death deeply affected Marguerite, who sought spiritual guidance from Briçonnet. Philiberta was also mourned by residents of Bugey. She was buried in a marble tomb at the Chapel of Nemours, adjoining the Shroud of Turin she had revered in life, and near the grave of her beloved mother.

=== Relics ===
In February 1636, Christine of France ordered repairs on the Chapel of Nemours that required moving Philiberta's tomb. When the tomb opened inadvertently, workers were surprised to find the body inside relatively intact. They sought the help of the Court of Auditors to verify what they had seen, aware that their attachment to the House of Savoy biased them. A Jesuit priest and historian named Father Colomby, who was visiting the area, was appointed to investigate. Colomby affirmed that Philiberta's body had unusually flexible limbs, well-preserved skin, and an intact face. Once his report concluded, her tomb was returned to the chapel.

Additional repairs to the chapel were conducted in 1661. This time, careless workers destroyed Philiberta's tomb with falling rocks. Both her tomb and her body shattered. This time, Philiberta's remains were divided into relics; local canons took her bones, head, and hair to be housed in different churches. Her head was eventually returned to the Chapel of Nemours.

== In art and culture ==
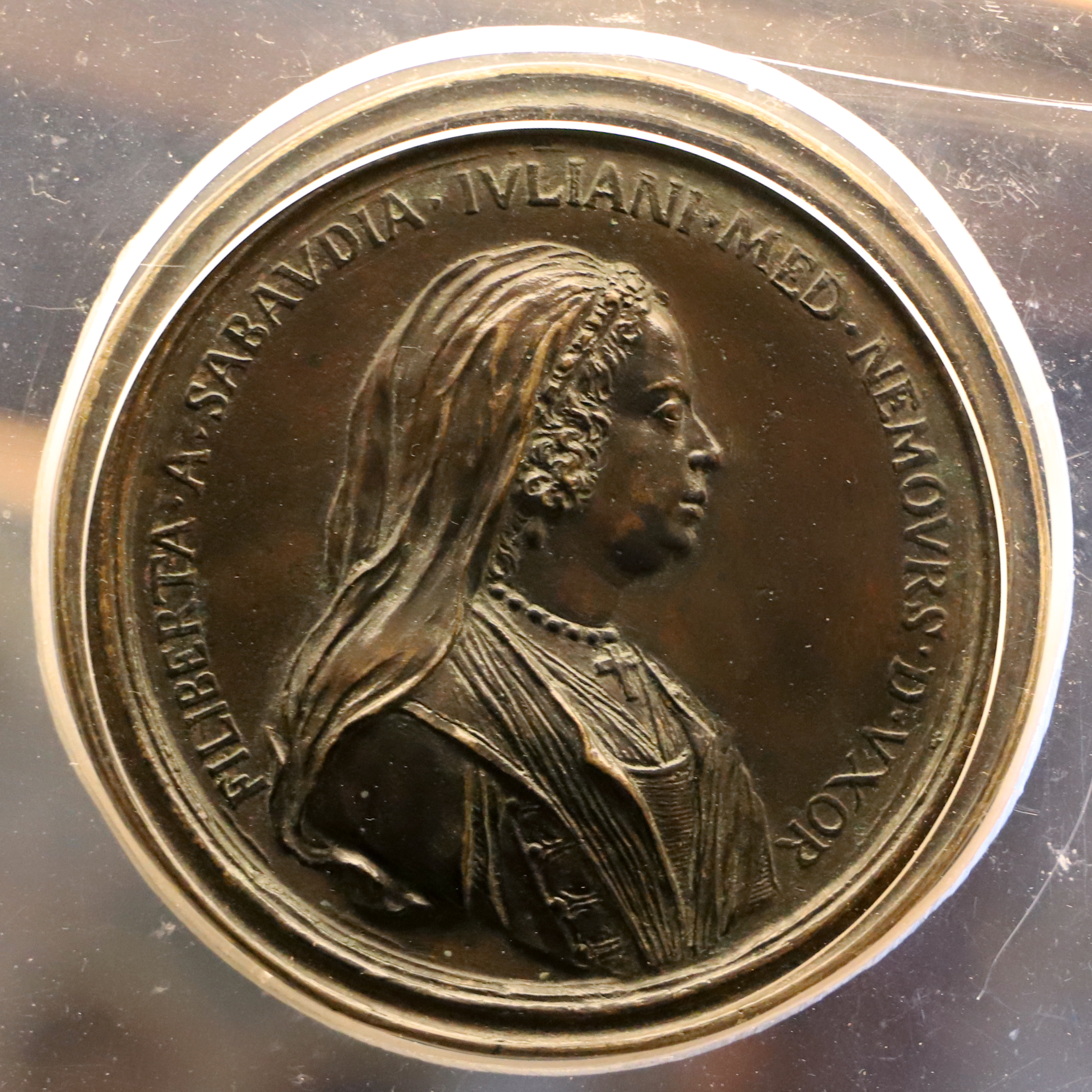
Medal depicting Philiberta (1739).

=== Poetry and art ===
Vittoria Colonna wrote poetry addressed to Philiberta during Philiberta's time in Rome. Upon Giuliano's death, Ludovico Ariosto wrote a memorial ode from the perspective of Giuliano's apparition, addressing the mourning Philiberta with affection.

In 1739, artist Antonio Francesco Selvi memorialised Philiberta in a bronze medal, as part of a series depicting figures associated with the House of Medici.

=== Modern works ===
A fictionalised Philiberta appears as a minor character in The Enchantress of Florence (2008) by Salman Rushdie.

=== Association with Leonardo da Vinci ===
Philiberta's marriage to Giuliano de' Medici was a disappointment to the artist Leonardo da Vinci, of whom Giuliano was a patron. Some scholars believe that da Vinci's composition, Allegory of the Wolf and the Eagle, was likely created around the time of the wedding. It is commonly interpreted as an allegorical (and possibly satirical) commentary on political power struggles between Italy's Medici papacy and the French monarchy at the time.

Some scholars have further suggested that Philiberta may have inspired the Mona Lisa. Others hypothesise that Giuliano commissioned the painting to depict another of his lovers, but did not claim the finished work in order to avoid upsetting Philiberta. However, neither theory is a popular school of thought among art historians.
