= Claudine de Brosse =

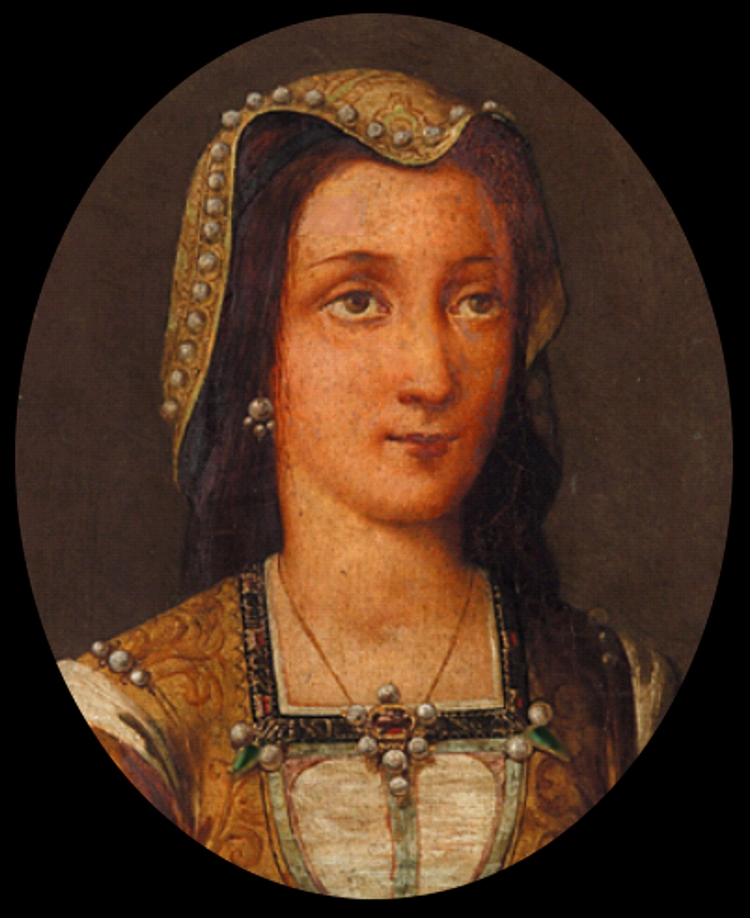

Duchess consort of Savoy
- Tenure: 16 April 1496 – 7 November 1497
- Born: 1450
- Died: 1513 (aged 62–63)
- Spouse: Philip II, Duke of Savoy
- Issue: Charles III, Duke of Savoy; Philippe, Duke of Nemours; Philiberta, Duchess of Nemours
- House: de Brosse
- Father: Jean II de Brosse
- Mother: Nicole, Countess of Penthièvre

Claudine de Brosse (1450 – 13 October 1513) was a French noblewoman and Duchess Consort of Savoy in 1496–1497 by marriage to Philip II, Duke of Savoy. She was regent of Savoy during the minority of Philibert II, Duke of Savoy between 1497 and 1498.

== Early life ==
Claudine was born in Brittany to Jean II de Brosse and Nicole de Châtillon in 1450. The daughter of a countess and a jure uxoris count, Claudine was exposed to political manoeuvring in her youth. She adopted a motto from one of her grandfathers: encore est vive la souris ("the mouse is still alive"), itself likely taken from a ballad by Charles, Duke of Orléans.

== Marriage ==
Claudine married Philip II, Count of Bresse on 11 November, 1485. She was his second wife, following the death of Margaret of Bourbon in 1483. Early in their marriage, she was frustrated to find competition for her husband's favour with existing members of his inner circle. Nonetheless, she made reference to her motto ("the mouse is still alive") in a letter to a friend, and suggested she was confident that she could secure her position.

Claudine assumed responsibility for raising Philip's children from a previous marriage, and had six children with him, three of whom survived infancy. Their eldest was Charles III, who succeeded his half-brother as duke of Savoy; their youngest was Philiberta of Savoy, eventual Duchess of Nemours. Son Philip later became duke of Nemours. Of their remaining children, Louis (1488–1502), died as a teenager, and two died shortly after birth: Assolone (1494) and Giovanni Amedeo (1495).

Claudine would develop an especially close relationship with Philiberta, who served as her "constant companion" until Claudine's death in 1513.

== Duchess and dowager ==
In April 1496, Claudine's husband became duke of Savoy, and she became duchess consort His reign was short-lived: he died in November 1497, while Claudine was still pregnant with their daughter, Philiberta.

Claudine acted as regent of the duchy of Savoy until her husband's successor, Philibert II, came of age. The wax seal she used during this period depicted a combined coat of arms representing the families Savoy, Brosse, and Brittany.

Upon Philip's death, she became the usufructuary dowager of several territories throughout Auvergne-Rhône-Alpes. Of these, her favourite was Billiat; she retreated to an estate there in 1498, where she largely spent the rest of her life.

In widowhood, Claudine concentrated on spiritual affairs. She donated a vineyard in the parish of Bassens in return for an understanding that its canons end every mass with an antiphon in honour of the Virgin Mary. She particularly revered the Shroud of Turin, a relic believed by some Catholics to be the burial shroud of Jesus, which was in the House of Savoy's possession. She believed it was capable of miracles, such as protecting those who viewed it from illness, and kept it with her at Billiat for a time. Her strong religious convictions greatly influenced Philiberta.

In 1504, Philibert II died, and her eldest son Charles became the duke of Savoy. At the time of Charles' ascension, nearly two-thirds of Savoy's annual revenues were committed to payments for widows of previous dukes, of which Claudine was one, alongside Blanche de Montferrat and Marguerite d’Autriche.

In 1506, Claudine and Charles successfully petitioned Pope Julius II to declare that the shroud was a true relic of Jesus. They also convinced the Catholic Church to introduce the Feast of the Holy Winding Sheet of Christ. The Catholic Church has not maintained its explicit endorsement of the relic's authenticity in the centuries since, though the feast day continues.

== Later life and death ==
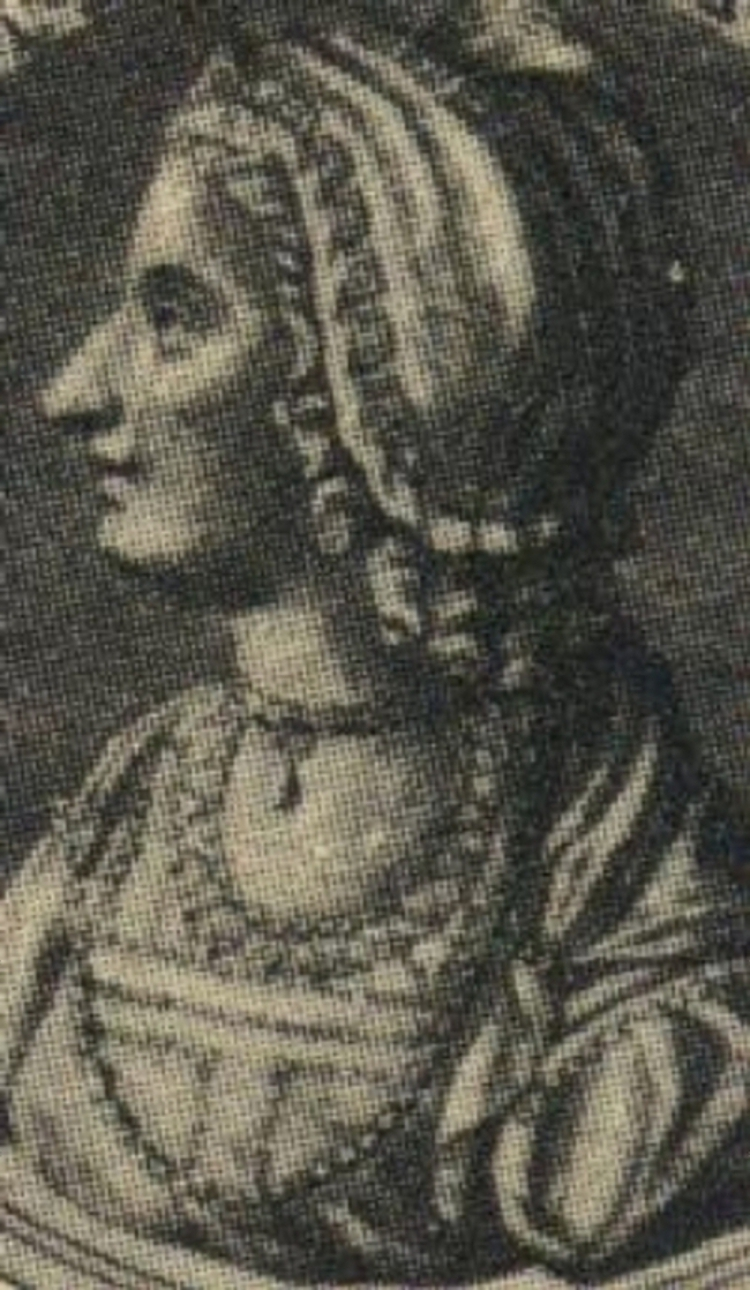
Depiction of Claudine.

With the urging of the French crown, Philiberta was engaged to Italian nobleman Giuliano de' Medici in 1513. Giuliano was the brother of Pope Leo X, and the marriage between the House of Savoy and House of Medici was seen as politically advantageous for both France and Italy. In one of her final acts before her death, Claudine approved the engagement.

Claudine died on 13 October, 1513 in Chambéry. She was initially buried at the Sainte-Chapelle, the chapel at the House of Savoy's Château des ducs de Savoie complex in Chambéry. Her eldest son, Charles, organised a grand funeral for her.

Some time before the late 19th century, her remains were relocated to the Chapel of Nemours at the same complex to rest beside those of her daughter, Philiberta.

== Sources ==
- Cholakian, Patricia Francis; Cholakian, Rouben Charles (2006). Marguerite de Navarre. Columbia University Press.
- Setton, Kenneth M. (1984). The Papacy and the Levant, 1204-1571. Vol. IV. The American Philosophical Society.
