= Charles V of Spain =

Charles V of Spain may refer to:

- Charles V, Holy Roman Emperor, who between 1516 and 1556 was also King Charles I of Spain
- Charles, Count of Molina, who claimed the crown as Charles V of Spain between 1833 and 1845

== See also ==
- Charles V (disambiguation)
