= Charles II =

Charles II may refer to:

== Kings or Emperors ==
- Charles II of France or Charles the Bald (823–877), king of the West Franks and Holy Roman Emperor
- Charles II of Naples (1254–1309)
- Charles II of Navarre (1332–1387)
- Charles II of Sweden or Charles VIII of Sweden (1409–1470)
- Charles II of Spain (1661–1700)
- Charles II of Norway or Charles XIII of Sweden (1748–1818)
- Charles II of Romania or Carol II (1893–1953)
- Charles II of England (1630–1685)
- Charles II of Bohemia or Charles VI, Holy Roman Emperor (1685–1740)

== Others ==
- Charles II of Alençon (1297–1346)
- Charles II, Duke of Lorraine (1364–1431)
- Charles II, Duke of Bourbon (1434–1488)
- Charles II, Duke of Guelders (1467–1538)
- Charles II of Savoy (1489–1496)
- Charles II, Count of Nevers (died 1521)
- Charles II, Duke of Orléans (1522–1545)
- Charles II, Margrave of Baden-Durlach (1529–1577)
- Charles II, Archduke of Inner Austria (1540–1590)
- Charles II, Count of Hohenzollern-Sigmaringen (1547–1606)
- Charles II, Lord of Monaco (1555–1589)
- Charles II, Duke of Elbeuf (1596–1657)
- Charles II, Duke of Mantua and Montferrat (1629–1665)
- Charles II, Elector Palatine (1651–1685)
- Charles II, Grand Duke of Mecklenburg-Strelitz (1741–1816)
- Charles II, Duke of Parma (1799–1883)
- Charles II, Landgrave of Hesse-Philippsthal (1803–1868)
- Charles II, Duke of Brunswick (1804–1873)
- Charles Albert II, Prince of Hohenlohe-Waldenburg-Schillingsfürst (1742–1796)
- Charles Egon II, Prince of Fürstenberg (1796–1854)
- Charles Emmanuel II, Duke of Savoy (1634–1675)
- Charles Frederick II, Duke of Württemberg-Oels (1690–1761)
- Fancy (ship), a privateer frigate originally christened Charles II

== See also ==
- Charles
- King Charles (disambiguation)
