= Charles III (disambiguation) =

Charles III (born 1948) is King of the United Kingdom and 14 other Commonwealth realms.

Charles III or 3 may also refer to:

== Kings and emperors ==
- Charles III of the Carolingian Empire ("Charles the Fat") (839–888)
- Charles III of West Francia ("Charles the Simple") (879–929)
- Charles III of Naples (1345–1386)
- Charles III of Navarre (1361–1425)
- Charles III of Hungary and Croatia (Charles VI, Holy Roman Emperor) (1685–1740)
- Charles Emmanuel III of Sardinia (1701–1773)
- Charles III of Spain (1716–1788) (previously reigned as Charles III of Sicily)
  - The name Charles III of Spain was previously used by Charles VI, Holy Roman Emperor (1685–1740) during the War of the Spanish Succession, c. 1705–1713
  - The name Charles III of Sicily is also sometimes used to refer to Charles II of Spain (1661–1700), who was the third king named Charles to rule in Sicily.
- Charles III John of Norway (Charles XIV John of Sweden and Norway) (1763–1844)
- Charles III of Bohemia (Charles I of Austria) (1887–1922)

== Other nobles and royals ==
- Charles III of Anjou (1290–1325)
- Charles III of Alençon (1337–1375)
- Charles III of Savoy (1486–1553)
- Charles III, Duke of Bourbon (1490–1527)
- Charles III of Lorraine (1543–1608)
- Charles III, Prince of Guéméné (1655–1727)
- Charles III Philip, Elector Palatine (1661–1742)
- Charles III William, Margrave of Baden-Durlach (1679–1738)
- Charles Albert III of Hohenlohe-Waldenburg-Schillingsfürst (1776–1843)
- Charles III of Monaco (1818–1889)
- Charles Egon III, Prince of Fürstenberg (1820–1892)
- Charles III of Parma (1823–1854)

== Pretenders ==
- Charles Edward Stuart (1720–1788), Stuart pretender who styled himself Charles III

== Art and Entertainment ==
- Charles III (album), by organist Charles Earland
- His Majesty King Charles III (portrait)
- King Charles III (play), a 2014 play by Mike Bartlett, about the future British king (released when he was still Prince of Wales)
  - King Charles III (film), a 2017 adaptation of the play

== See also ==
- King Charles (disambiguation)
- Order of Charles III, established by Charles III of Spain
- Royal Family Order of Charles III
- Carlos III (disambiguation)
