= King Charles =

King Charles may refer to:

== Kings ==
- Charles I (disambiguation)
- Charles II (disambiguation)
- Charles III (disambiguation)
  - Charles III, the current king of the United Kingdom and other realms (born 1948)
- Charles IV (disambiguation)
- Charles V (disambiguation)
- Charles VI (disambiguation)
- Charles VII (disambiguation)
- Charles VIII (disambiguation)
- Charles IX (disambiguation)
- Charles X (disambiguation)
- Charles XI of Sweden (1655–1697)
- Charles XII of Sweden (1682–1718)
- Charles XIII of Sweden (1748–1818)
- Charles XIV of Sweden (1763–1844)
- Charles XV of Sweden (1826–1872)
- Carl XVI Gustaf of Sweden (born 1946)

== Dogs ==
- Cavalier King Charles Spaniel
- King Charles Spaniel

== Media ==
- King Charles (film), a 1913 British silent historical film about Charles II of England
- King Charles (news program), a former American news discussion show on CNN (2023-2024)

== Other uses ==
- King Charles (musician) (born 1985), singer-songwriter
- King Charles's Island, a former name of two islands in the Galápagos Archipelago, now chiefly Floreana Island

== See also ==
- Charles King (disambiguation)
- Charles Rex (disambiguation), "Charles the King" in Latin, as used in some forms of address in English
- Carolus Rex (disambiguation), "King Charles" in its latinate form, as used in some formal documents in English
- Prince Charles (disambiguation)
- Lord Charles (disambiguation)
- Sir Charles (disambiguation)
- Charles (disambiguation)
