= Charles B. King =

Charles B. King may refer to:

- Charles B. King (soldier) (died 1944), American namesake of Camp King in Germany
- Charles Bird King (1785–1862), United States portrait painter
- Charles Brady King (1868-1957), American engineer & entrepreneur

== See also ==
- Charles King (disambiguation)
- King (surname)
