= Louise of Savoy =

Mother of Francis I, Regent of France (1476–1531)

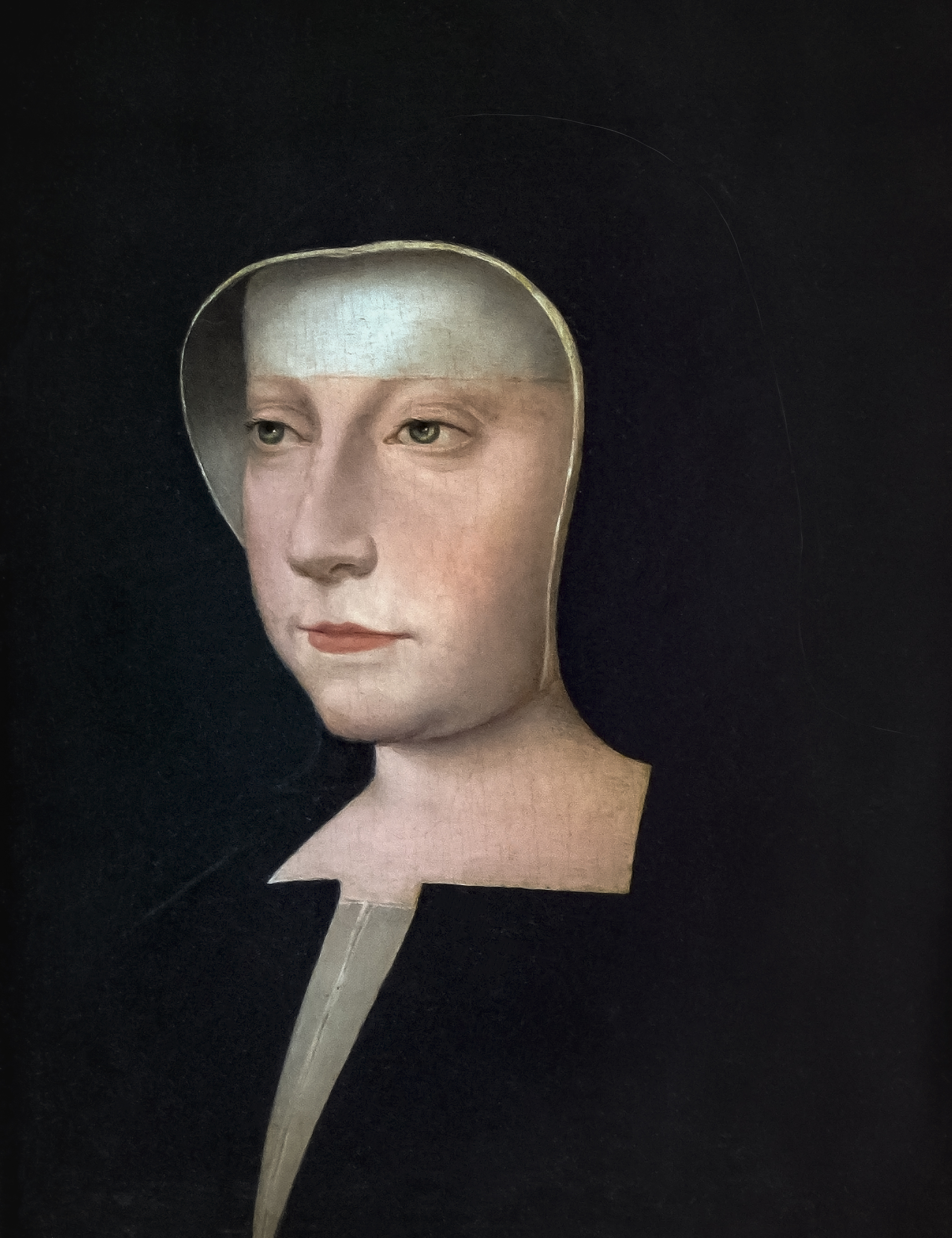
- Portrait by Jean Clouet

Regent of France
- Regency: 1515–1516; 1523–1526; 1529
- Monarch: Francis I
- Born: 11 September 1476; Pont-d'Ain
- Died: 22 September 1531 (aged 55); Grez-sur-Loing
- Burial: 19 October 1531; Basilica of St Denis, France
- Spouse: Charles, Count of Angoulême (m. 1488; died 1496)
- Issue: Marguerite, Queen of Navarre; Francis I of France
- House: Savoy
- Father: Philip II, Duke of Savoy
- Mother: Margaret of Bourbon

Louise of Savoy (11 September 1476 – 22 September 1531) was a French noble and regent, Duchess suo jure of Auvergne and Bourbon, Duchess of Nemours and the mother of King Francis I and Marguerite of Navarre. She was politically active and served as the regent of France in 1515, in 1525–1526 and in 1529, during the absence of her son.

== Family and early life ==
Louise of Savoy was born at Pont-d'Ain, the eldest daughter of Philip II, Duke of Savoy and his first wife, Margaret of Bourbon. Her brother, Philibert II, Duke of Savoy, succeeded her father as ruler of the duchy and head of the House of Savoy. He was, in turn, succeeded by their half-brother Charles III, Duke of Savoy.

Because her mother died when she was only seven, she was brought up by Anne de Beaujeu, who was regent of France for her brother Charles VIII. At Amboise she met Margaret of Austria (daughter of Maximilian and Mary of Burgundy), who was betrothed to the young king and with whom Louise would negotiate peace several decades later.

== Marriage ==
At age eleven, Louise married Charles of Orléans, Count of Angoulême, on 16 February 1488 in Paris, though she only began living with him when she was fifteen. Despite her husband having two mistresses, the marriage was happy, and they shared a love of books.

Charles' household was presided over by his châtelaine Antoinette de Polignac, Dame de Combronde, by whom he had two illegitimate daughters, Jeanne of Angoulême and Madeleine. Antoinette became Louise's lady-in-waiting and confidante. Her children were raised alongside Louise's own. Charles had another illegitimate daughter, Souveraine, by Jeanne le Conte, who also lived in the Angoulême chateau. She would later arrange marriages for her husband's illegitimate children.

Their first child, Marguerite, was born on 11 April 1492; their second child, Francis, was born on 12 September 1494.

When her husband fell ill after going out riding in the winter of 1495, she nursed him and suffered much grief when he died on 1 January 1496.

Terracotta bust from 1515, Louvre Museum.

== Widowed and motherhood ==
When she was widowed at the young age of 19, Louise deftly manoeuvred her children into a position that would secure for each of them a promising future. Though they remained in Cognac for two years, she moved her family to court on the accession of King Louis XII, her husband's cousin.

Louise had a keen awareness of the intricacies of politics and diplomacy, and was deeply interested in the artistic and scientific advances of Renaissance Italy. She made certain that her children were educated in the spirit of the Italian Renaissance, assisted by her Italian confessor, Cristoforo Numai from Forlì. She commissioned books specifically for them and she taught Francis Italian and Spanish.

When Louis XII became ill in 1505, he determined that Francis should succeed him and that both Louise and Francis's wife Anne of Brittany should be part of the regency council. He recovered and Francis became a favourite of the king, who eventually gave him his daughter Claude of France in marriage on 8 May 1514. Following the marriage, Louis XII made Francis his heir.

== Mother of the King ==
With the death of Louis XII on 1 January 1515, Francis became king of France. On 4 February 1515, Louise was named Duchess of Angoulême, and on 15 April 1524, Duchess of Anjou.

=== The Bourbon inheritance ===
Her mother having been one of the sisters of the last dukes of the main branch of Bourbon, after the death of Suzanne, Duchess of Bourbon, in 1521, Louise, on basis of proximity of blood, advanced claims to the Duchy of Auvergne and other possessions of the Bourbons. Francis supported her, but this led then into rivalry with Charles III, Duke of Bourbon, Suzanne's widower, whom she proposed to marry in order to settle the Bourbon inheritance issue. When her suit was insultingly rejected by Charles, Louise instigated efforts to undermine him. This led to Charles' exile and his attempt to regain his lost status by waging war against the King. He died in 1527 having failed to regain his lost lands and titles. Louise recovered Auvergne from confiscations and became duchess in the name of her son.

=== Regent ===
Louise of Savoy remained politically active on behalf of her son, especially in the early years of his reign. During his absences, she acted as regent on his behalf. Louise served as the Regent of France in 1515, during the king's war in Italy, and again from 1525 to 1526, when the king was at war and during his time as a prisoner in Spain.

In 1524, she sent one of her servants, Jean-Joachim de Passano, to London to open unofficial negotiations with Cardinal Wolsey for a peace treaty; the negotiations were not a success, although they may have prepared the ground for the Treaty of the More the following year.

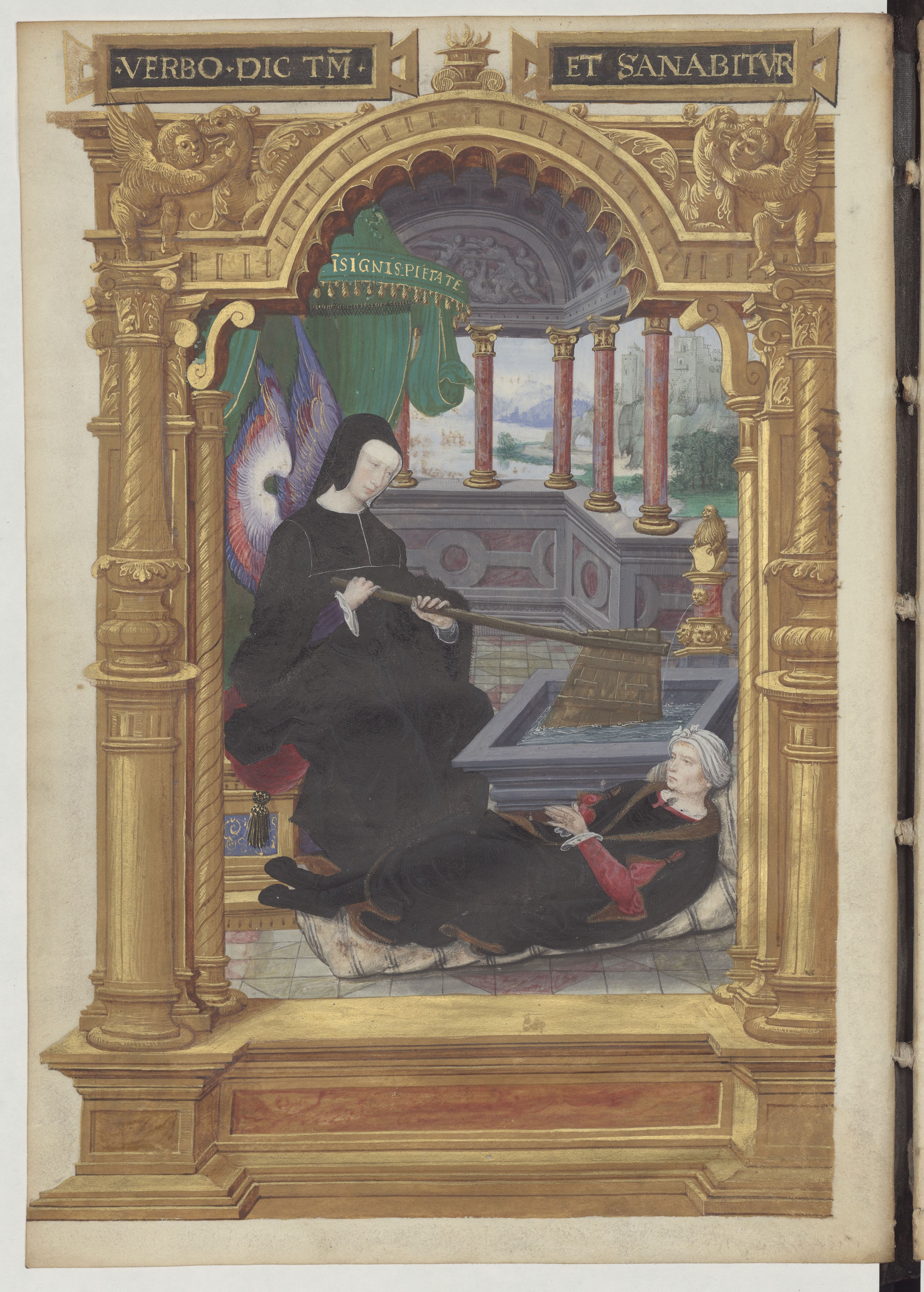
Louise of Savoy symbolically taking over the "rudder" in 1525, and requesting the help of Suleiman the Magnificent, here shown lying at her feet enturbanned

She initiated friendly relations with the Ottoman Empire by sending a mission to Suleiman the Magnificent requesting assistance, but the mission was lost on its way in Bosnia. In December 1525, a second mission was sent, led by John Frangipani, which managed to reach Constantinople, the Ottoman capital, with secret letters asking for assistance in getting Francis released and an attack on Habsburg possessions. Frangipani returned with a positive answer from Suleiman on 6 February 1526, initiating the first steps of a Franco-Ottoman alliance.

She was the principal negotiator for the Treaty of Cambrai between France and the Holy Roman Empire, which concluded on 3 August 1529. That treaty, called "the Ladies' Peace", ended the second Italian war between the head of the Valois dynasty, Francis I of France, and the head of the Habsburg dynasty, Charles V, Holy Roman Emperor. The Treaty temporarily confirmed Habsburg hegemony in Italy. The treaty was signed by Louise of Savoy for France and her sister-in-law, Margaret of Austria, for the Holy Roman Empire.

== Death ==
Louise of Savoy died on 22 September 1531, in Grez-sur-Loing of the plague. Her remains were entombed at Saint-Denis in Paris. After her death, her lands, including Auvergne, became crown lands. Through her daughter Marguerite (Queen of Navarre) and her granddaughter Jeanne d'Albret, she is the ancestress of the Bourbon kings of France, as her great-grandson, Henry of Navarre, succeeded as Henry IV of France.

== Sources ==
- Hacket, Francis (1937). Francis the First. Garden City, New York: Doubleday, Doran and Company, Inc. ASIN B001DW6NR8.
- Jansen, Sharon L. (2002). The Monstrous Regiment of Women: Female Rulers in Early Modern Europe. Palgrave Macmillan.
- Knecht, R.J. (1982). Francis I. Cambridge University Press.
- Merriman, Robert Bigelow (1966). Suleiman the Magnificent 1520-1566. Cooper Square Publishers Inc.
- Seward, Desmond (1973). Prince of the Renaissance: The Golden Life of François I. New York: Macmillan Publishing Co. ISBN 9780026097000.

Louise of Savoy House of Savoy Born: 11 September 1476 Died: 22 September 1531
| Preceded by New creation | Duchess of Nemours; 1524–1528 | Succeeded by Philip of Savoy |
