= Charles Rex =

Charles Rex may refer to:

- King Charles (disambiguation), a number of kings' names, and persons' nicknames
- Charles Rex (novel), a 1922 romance novel by Ethel M. Dell

== See also ==
- Charles Rex Berry (1924–2005), American football player
- Carolus Rex (disambiguation), where Carolus is Latin for Charles
