= Carlos III =

Carlos III may refer to:

- Charles III of Spain, King of Spain from 1759 to 1788
- Royal and Distinguished Spanish Order of Carlos III, a Spanish award
- Universidad Carlos III de Madrid, a Spanish university bearing his name

== See also ==
- Charles III (disambiguation)
