= Charles VI =

Charles VI may refer to:

== Kings and Emperors ==
- Charles VI of France (1368–1422), "the Well-Beloved" and "The Mad"
- Charles VI, Holy Roman Emperor (1685–1740), and Charles VI of Naples

== Others ==
- Infante Carlos, Count of Montemolin (1818–1861), pretender to the throne of Spain, styled "Charles VI" by Carlists
- Charles VI, Prince of Löwenstein-Wertheim-Rosenberg (1834–1921)
- Charles VI (opera), an 1843 opera by Fromental Halévy

== See also ==
- King Charles (disambiguation)
- Charles
