= Charles VIII =

Charles VIII may refer to:

- Charles VIII of Sweden (1409–1470), Charles II of Sweden, Charles I of Norway
- Charles VIII of France (1470–1498), "the Affable"
- Carlos VIII (disambiguation), regnal name of two claimants to the Spanish throne

== See also ==
- King Charles (disambiguation)
- Charles, given name
