= Carolus Rex (disambiguation) =

Carolus Rex frequently refers to King Charles XII of Sweden

Carolus Rex (Latin: King Charles) may also refer to:

- King Charles (disambiguation), kings named Charles, who in Latin documents and on 17th-century English coins are referred to as "Carolus Rex"
- Carolus Rex (bastion), a portion of the Gothenburg city wall
- Carolus Rex (album), a 2012 album by Sabaton
- Carolus Rex March, a Swedish military march composed by Wilhelm Harteveld

== See also ==
- Charles Rex (disambiguation)
- Carolus (disambiguation)
- Rex (disambiguation)
