= Charles King =

Charles or Charlie King may refer to:

== Academics and writers ==
- Charles King (educator) (1789–1867), American academic, politician and newspaper editor
- Charles Ray King (1813–1901), American physician and author, son of John Alsop King, grandson of Rufus King
- Charles William King (1818–1888), English writer and collector of gems
- Charles Glen King (1896–1988), American biochemist
- Charles King, pen name of E. Lee Spence (born 1947), American author/editor of non-fiction
- Charles King (professor of international affairs) (born 1967), American academic and author

== Designers ==
- Charles Brady King (1868–1957), American inventor and automobile pioneer
- Charles Spencer King (1925–2010), English designer of Land Rovers

== Military ==
- Charles King (general) (1844–1933), American military leader and author
- Charles King (British Army officer) (1890–1967), British engineer and army officer
- Colonel Charles B. King (c.1910–1944), American intelligence officer killed in World War II (see Camp King § Post World War II (1945-1953))
- Charles Edwin King (1849–1862), Union Army drummer and the youngest confirmed soldier to die during the American Civil War
- Charles Monroe King, United States Army soldier and subject of the book A Journal for Jordan: A Story of Love and Honor by Dana Canedy and the upcoming film A Journal for Jordan

== Performers ==
- Charles King (musical actor) (1886–1944), American vaudevillian actor
- Charles King (character actor) (1895–1957), American film actor
- Charlie King (folk singer) (born 1947), American folk singer and activist
- Charlie King (The Only Way Is Essex), English participant in scripted reality show

== Politicians ==
- Charles D. B. King (1875–1961), President of Liberia
- Charles J. King (1925–2016), member of the Florida House of Representatives
- Charlie King (politician) (born 1959), American politician and attorney from New York City

== Sports ==
- Charles King (English cricketer) (1832–1872), English cricketer
- Charles King (New Zealand cricketer) (1847–1917), New Zealand cricketer
- Charles King (footballer) (1860–1928), English footballer; played in 1880 FA Cup Final
- Charles King (athlete) (1880–1958), American Olympic silver medalist
- Charles King (cyclist) (1911–2001), British Olympic cyclist
- Charlie King (American football) (1943–2026) American football player
- Charlie King (baseball) (1912–1969), American baseball player
- Charlie King (Australian footballer) (1926–2007), Australian rules footballer for Geelong
- Charlie King (sports broadcaster), first indigenous Australian sports commentator at Olympic Games
- Charlie King (footballer, born 1979), Scottish footballer

== Others ==
- Charles King (merchant) (fl. 1721), British merchant and writer on economics
- Charles King (composer) (1687–1748), English composer and musician
- Charles Bird King (1785–1862), American portrait painter
- Charles W. King (before 1805–after 1849), American merchant in 1837 Morrison incident
- Charles Henry King (1853–1930), American businessman and banker in Nebraska
- Charles E. King (1874–1950), educator, Hawaii territorial legislator and songwriter
- Charles King (1912–1972), American TV executive and founder of King World Productions
- Charles King, co-founder and CEO of the nonprofit Housing Works

== See also ==
- King (surname)
- King Charles (disambiguation), for kings named Charles
