= Charles VII =

Charles VII may refer to:

== Kings and Emperors ==
- Charles VII of Sweden (1130–1167), actually Charles I of Sweden (1161–1167)
- Charles VII of France (1403–1461), "the Victorious"
- Charles VII, Holy Roman Emperor (1697–1745)
- Charles III of Spain (1716–1788), and Charles VII of Naples

== Others ==
- Carlos María de los Dolores (1848–1909), pretender to the throne of Spain, styled "Charles VII" by Carlists
- Charles VII, Archduke of Austria

== See also ==
- King Charles (disambiguation)
- Charles
