= Carlos VIII =

Carlos VIII may refer to:

- Carlos Hugo, Duke of Parma (1930–2010)
- Archduke Karl Pius of Austria, Prince of Tuscany (1909–1953)

== See also ==
- Charles VIII (disambiguation)
