= Carl I =

Carl I may refer to:

- Carl VII of Sweden (ca. 1130–1167), actually the first historically known Swedish Charles.
- Carl I of Norway (1409–1470), VIII of Sweden.

== See also ==
- Charles I (disambiguation)
