= Margaret of Bourbon (1438–1483) =

Countess of Bresse

- Countess of Bresse; Lady of Bugey
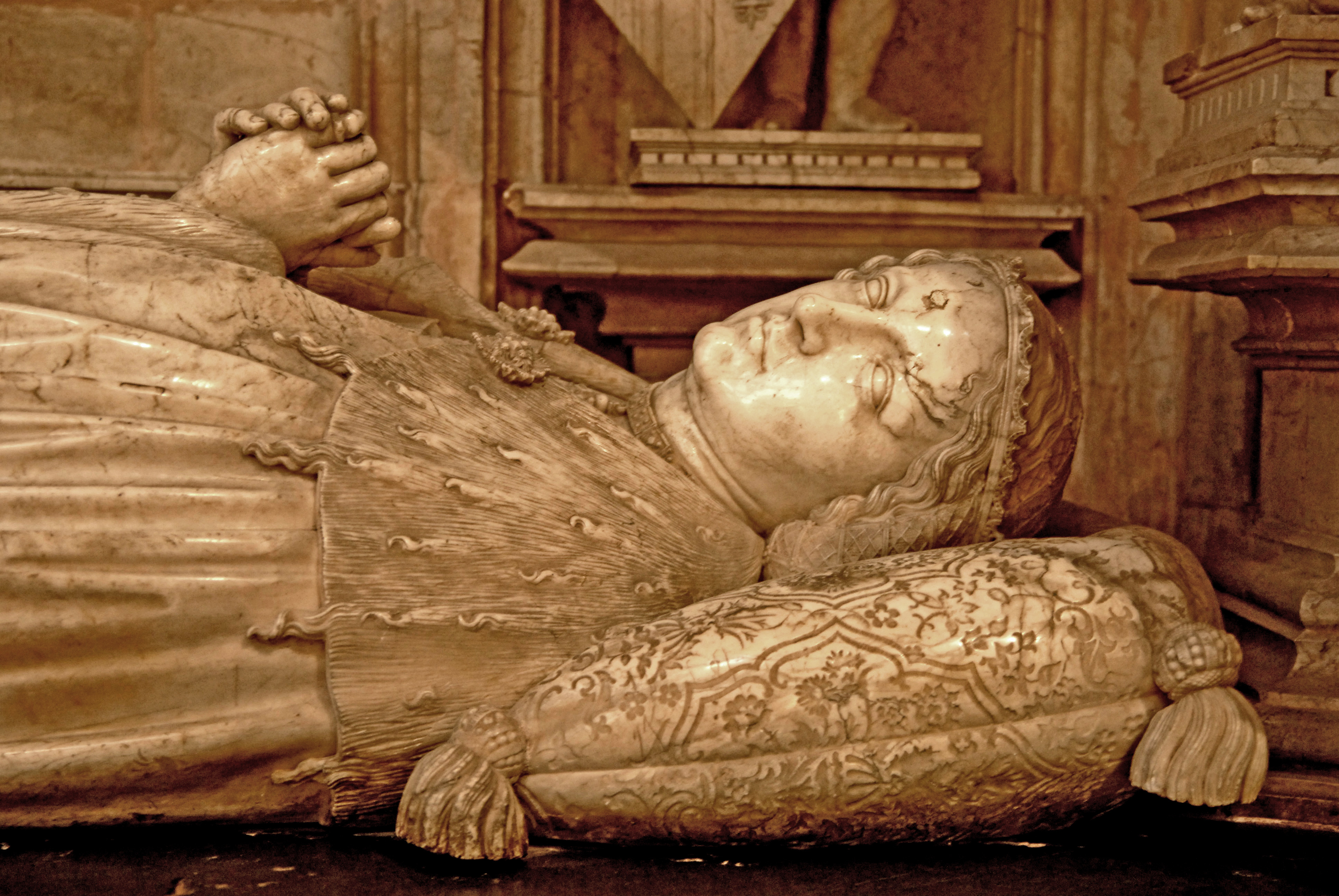
- Born: 5 February 1438
- Died: 24 April 1483 (aged 45)
- Spouse: Philip II, Duke of Savoy
- Issue: Louise, Countess of Angoulême; Girolamo; Philibert II, Duke of Savoy
- House: Bourbon
- Father: Charles I, Duke of Bourbon
- Mother: Agnes of Burgundy

Margaret of Bourbon (5 February 1438 – 24 April 1483) was a French noblewoman and the first wife of Philip II, Duke of Savoy, from 1472 until her death in 1483. She was the daughter of Charles I, Duke of Bourbon and Agnes of Burgundy.

== Marriage and issue ==
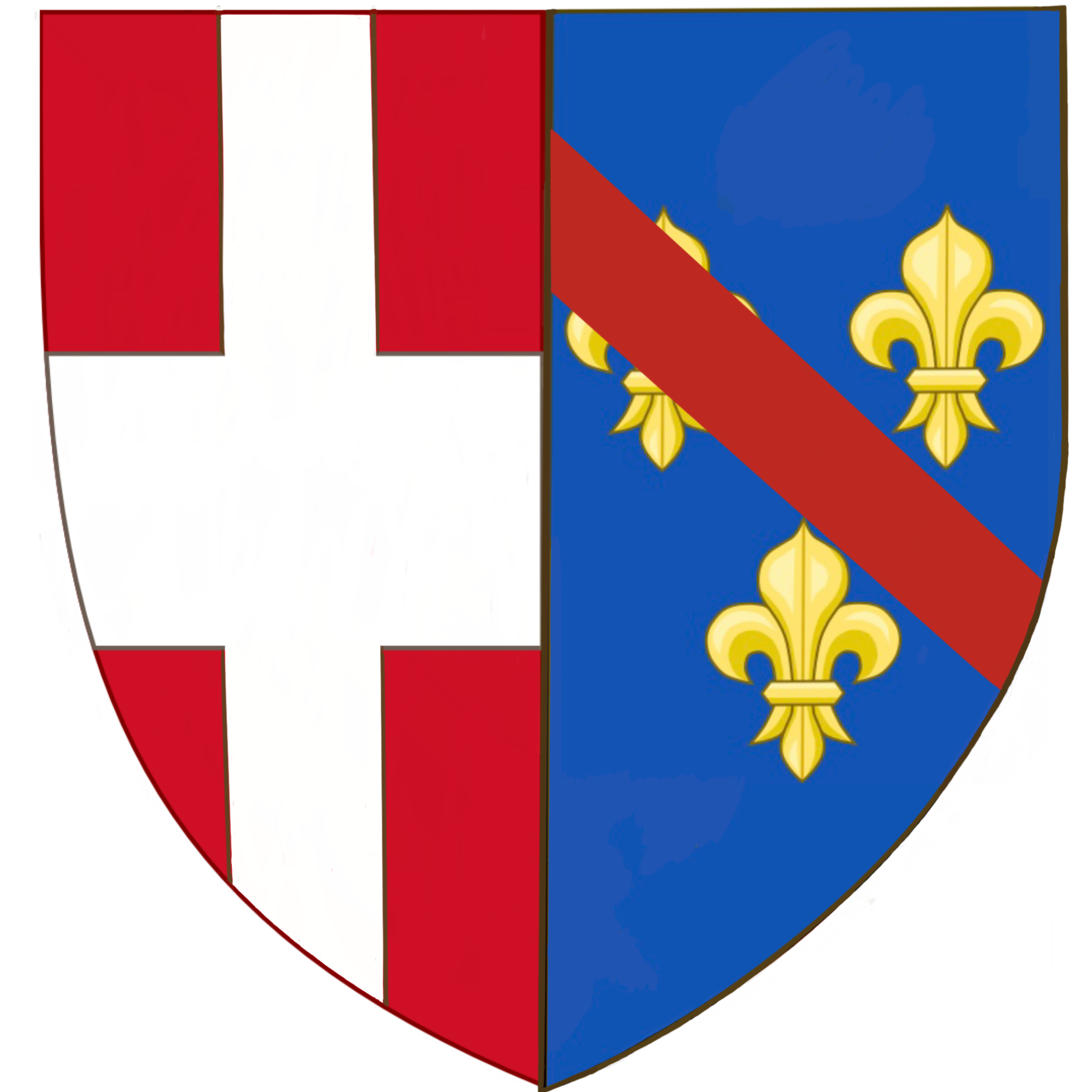
Coat of arms of Margaret of Bourbon

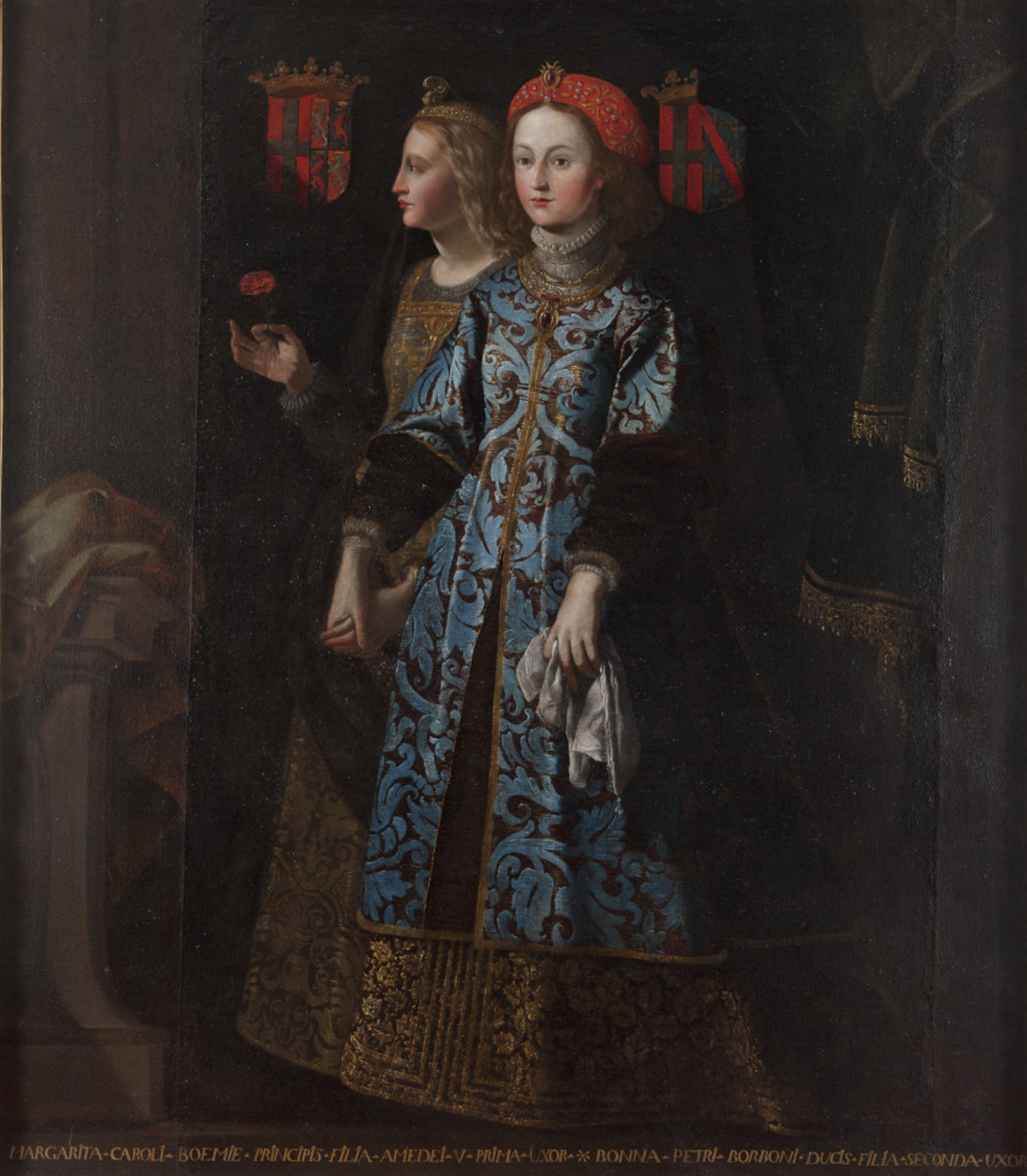
Portrait of Margaret of Bourbon and Claudine de Brosse, the first and second wives, respectively, of Philip II, Duke of Savoy. c. 1620–1635

On 6 April 1472, she became the first wife of Philip II, Duke of Savoy (1443–1497). Her children from this marriage were:

1. Louise (1476–1531), married Charles d'Orléans, Count of Angoulême, and had children including:
  1. Francis I of France, whose daughter Margaret of Valois married Emmanuel Philibert, Duke of Savoy.
  2. Marguerite of Navarre, Queen consort of King Henry II of Navarre.
2. Girolamo (1478)
3. Philibert II (1480–1504)

== Death ==
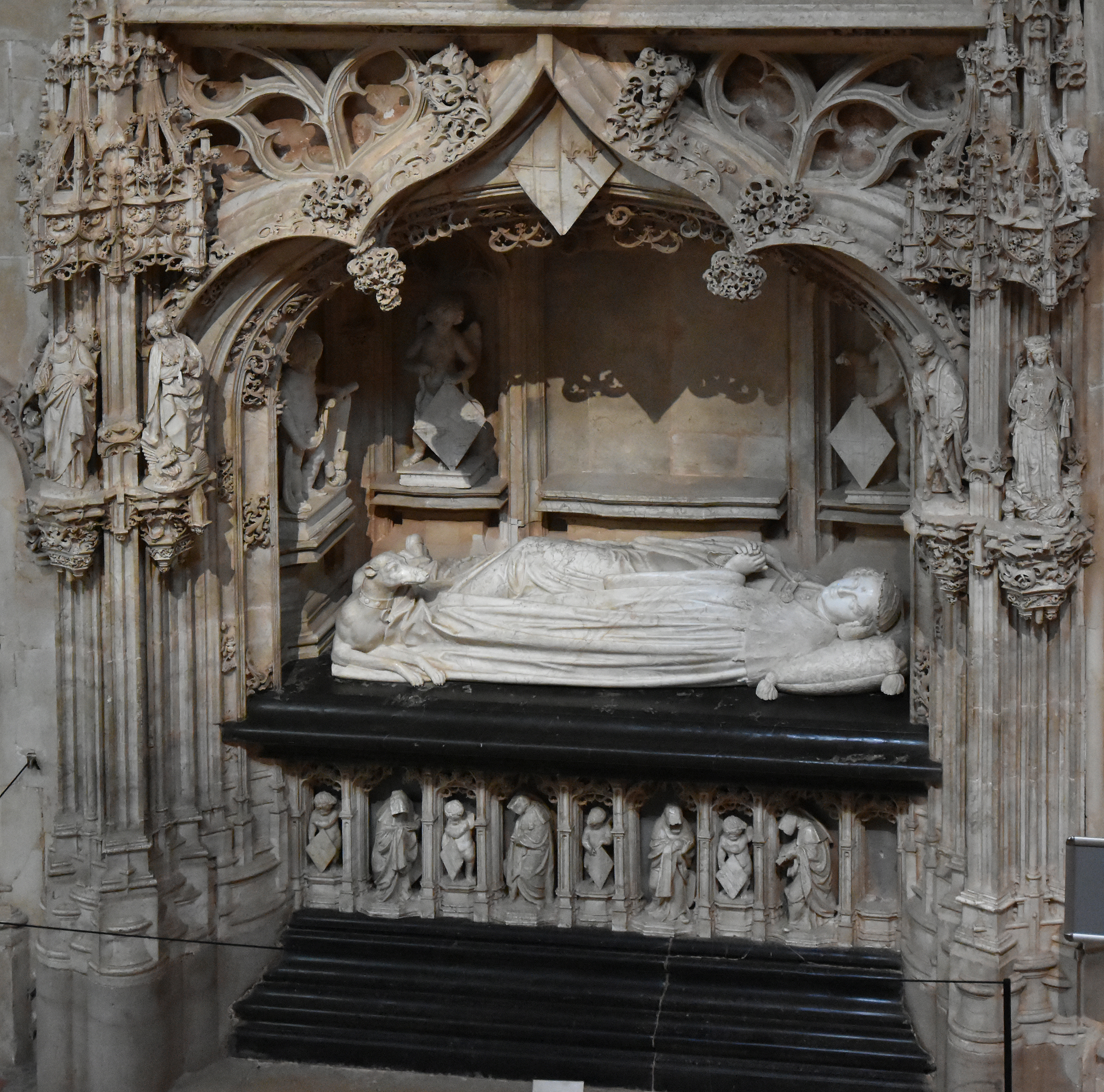
The tomb of Margaret in the Royal Monastery of Brou, Bourg-en-Bresse.

She died on 24 April 1483 at the Chateau de Pont d'Ain. Her tomb is currently in the Royal Monastery of Brou, which her daughter-in-law, Margaret of Austria, Duchess of Savoy, began in 1506 to house the tombs of Philbert after his early death, as well as Margaret and eventually herself.

== Ancestors ==
Ancestors of Margaret of Bourbon (1438–1483)

8. Louis II, Duke of Bourbon
4. John I, Duke of Bourbon
9. Anne of Auvergne, Countess of Forez
2. Charles I, Duke of Bourbon
10. John, Duke of Berry
5. Marie of Berry, Duchess of Auvergne
11. Joan of Armagnac
1. Margaret of Bourbon
12. Philip the Bold, Duke of Burgundy
6. John the Fearless, Duke of Burgundy
13. Margaret III of Flanders
3. Agnes of Burgundy
14. Albert I, Duke of Bavaria
7. Margaret of Bavaria
15. Margaret of Brieg

== Sources ==
- Hand, Joni M. (2013). Women, Manuscripts and Identity in Northern Europe, 1350-1550. Ashgate Publishing Limited.
- Knecht, R.J. (1982). Francis I. Cambridge University Press.
