= Charles IX =

Charles IX may refer to:

- Charles IX of France (1550–1574)
- Charles IX of Sweden (1550–1611)

== See also ==
- King Charles (disambiguation)
- Charles
