= Charles X =

Charles X may refer to:

- Charles X of France (1757–1836)
- Charles X Gustav (1622–1660), King of Sweden
- Charles, Cardinal de Bourbon (1523–1590), recognized as Charles X of France but renounced the royal title

== See also ==
- King Charles (disambiguation)
- Professor X, Charles Francis Xavier, a fictional character in X-Men comics and movies
- "Charlie X", a 1966 episode of the TV show Star Trek
