= Charles I =

Charles I may refer to:

== Kings and emperors ==
- Charlemagne (742–814), numbered Charles I in both list of Holy Roman Emperors and the list of French kings
- Charles I of Anjou (1226–1285), also king of Albania, Jerusalem, Naples and Sicily
- Charles I of Hungary (1288–1342), also king of Croatia
- Charles I of Navarre (1294–1328), also Charles IV of France
- Charles I of Bohemia (1316–1378), also Charles IV, Holy Roman Emperor
- Charles I of Norway (1408–1470), also Charles VIII of Sweden
- Charles V, Holy Roman Emperor (1500–1558), also Charles I of Spain
- Charles I of England (1600–1649)
- Charles I of Württemberg (1823–1891)
- Charles I of Romania or Carol I (1839–1914)
- Charles I of Portugal or Carlos I (1863–1908)
- Charles I of Austria or Karl I (1887–1922), also Charles IV of Hungary and Charles III of Bohemia

== Others ==
- Charles I, Duke of Lorraine (953–993)
- Charles I, Count of Flanders (1083–1127/86–1127), called Charles the Good
- Charles, Count of Valois or Charles I, count of Alençon 1291–1325
- Charles I, Lord of Monaco (died 1357)
- Charles I, Duke of Bourbon (1401–1456)
- Charles I, Count of Nevers (1414–1464)
- Charles I, Margrave of Baden-Baden (died 1475)
- Charles I, Count of Armagnac (1425–1497)
- Charles I, Count of Ligny (1448–1530)
- Charles I, Duke of Savoy (1468–1490), titular king of Cyprus, Jerusalem, and Armenia
- Charles I, Duke of Münsterberg-Oels (1476–1536)
- Charles I, Duke of Mecklenburg (1540–1610)
- Charles I, Duke of Elbeuf (1556–1605)
- Charles I, Count Palatine of Zweibrücken-Birkenfeld (1560–1600)
- Charles I, Duke of Mantua and Montferrat or Charles Gonzaga (1580–1637)
- Charles I Louis, Elector Palatine (1617–1680)
- Charles I, Landgrave of Hesse-Kassel (1654–1730)
- Charles I, Landgrave of Hesse-Philippsthal (1682–1770)
- Charles I, Duke of Brunswick-Wolfenbüttel (1713–1780)
- Charles I, Duke of Parma (1716–1788), also Charles III of Spain and Sicily and Charles VII of Naples
- Charles I, Duke of Lucca (1799–1883), also Charles II, Duke of Parma and Louis II of Etruria
- Charles Emmanuel I, Duke of Savoy (1562–1630)

== Artworks and literature ==
- Charles I in Three Positions, an oil painting of Charles I of England by Sir Anthony van Dyck (1635 or 1636)
- King Charles I (play), a 1737 play by William Havard
- Charles the First (Mitford play), an 1834 tragedy by Mary Russell Mitford
- Charles the First (Shelley play), an unfinished 1822 historical verse drama by Percy Bysshe Shelley
- Charles the First (Basquiat), by American artist Jean-Michel Basquiat

== See also ==
- Carl I (disambiguation)
