= Charles IV =

Charles IV may refer to:

== Kings and Emperors ==
- Charles IV of France (1294–1328), "the Fair"
- Charles IV, Holy Roman Emperor (1316–1378)
- Charles IV of Navarre (1421–1461)
- Charles V, Holy Roman Emperor (1500–1558), King of Naples as Charles IV
- Charles VI, Holy Roman Emperor (1685–1740), Duke of Brabant and King of Sicily as Charles IV
- Charles IV of Spain (1748–1819)
- Charles IV of Norway (1826–1872), also known as Charles XV in Sweden
- Charles IV of Hungary (1887–1922)
- Charles Emmanuel IV of Sardinia (1751–1819), also styled "Charles IV of England and Scotland" by Jacobites

== Others ==
- Charles IV of Maine (1414–1472)
- Charles IV of Anjou (1446–1481)
- Charles IV of Alençon (1489–1525)
- Charles, Duke of Vendôme (1489–1537), also known as Charles IV de Bourbon
- Charles IV, Duke of Lorraine (1604–1675)
- Charles Egon IV, Prince of Fürstenberg (1852–1896)

== See also ==
- King Charles (disambiguation)
