= Philip II of Savoy =

Duke of Savoy from 1496 to 1497

Philip II
- Portrait by Macrino d'Alba, c. 1497

Duke of Savoy
- Reign: 16 April 1496 – 7 November 1497
- Predecessor: Charles II
- Successor: Philibert II
- Born: 5 February 1438; Château de Chambéry, Duchy of Savoy
- Died: 7 November 1497 (aged 59); Château de Chambéry, Duchy of Savoy
- Spouse: Marguerite de Bourbon; Claudine de Brosse
- Issue: Louise, Countess of Angoulême; Philibert II of Savoy; Charles III, Duke of Savoy; Philippe, Duke of Nemours; Philiberta, Duchess of Nemours; René of Savoy (illegitimate); Antonia, Lady of Monaco (illegitimate); Claudina, Countess of Horne (illegitimate)
- House: Savoy
- Father: Louis of Savoy
- Mother: Anne of Cyprus

Philip II (5 February 1438 – 7 November 1497), known as the Landless, was Duke of Savoy from 1496 until his death in 1497. A member of a junior branch of the House of Savoy, he was the son of Louis I, Duke of Savoy, and the younger brother of Amadeus IX, Duke of Savoy. Philip inherited the duchy late in life, following the death of his grandnephew Charles II.

== Biography ==
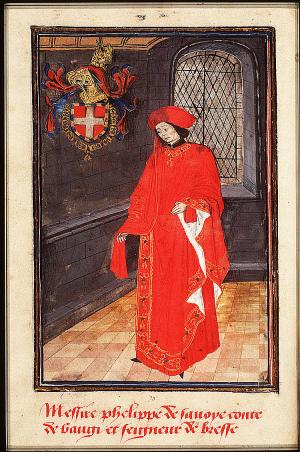
Philipp II in the manuscript Statuts, Ordonnances et Armorial de l'Ordre de la Toison d'Or, c. 1473

Philip was the granduncle of the previous duke Charles II, and the youngest surviving son of Louis, Duke of Savoy and Anne of Cyprus. However, he was not the heir general of the previous duke, there being several females before him in the line of succession. To ensure male inheritance to the Savoy line, his eldest son Philibert was married to his cousin, the only sister of the deceased young Duke. However, the plan did not succeed: the girl died at age twelve. (Philip had already died in the meantime.) The children of the daughters of Philip's eldest brother Duke Amadeo IX were next in line, and were entitled to the inheritance of the line of heirs-general, including Cyprus and Jerusalem. Despite the fact that Cyprus and Jerusalem did not bar succession in female line, Philip took those claims and used those titles as well. His male successors in Savoy also continued to do so, thus giving their ducal title a higher, royal titulary.

He spent most of his life as a junior member of the ducal family. His original apanage was the district of Bresse, close to the French and Burgundian border, but it was lost and therefore Philip received his sobriquet "the Landless", or "Lackland".

== Family ==
=== First marriage ===
He married Margaret of Bourbon (5 February 1438 – 1483) and had:

1. Louise (1476–1531), married Charles d'Orléans, Count of Angoulême, had children including:
  1. Francis I of France whose daughter Margaret of Valois married Emanuele Filiberto of Savoy.
  2. Marguerite of Navarre (1492–1549); Queen consort of King Henry II of Navarre
2. Girolamo (1478)
3. Philibert II (1480–1504)

Coat of Arms of the Dukes of Savoy

=== Second marriage ===
He married Claudine de Brosse of Brittany (1450–1513), daughter of Jean II de Brosse and Nicole de Châtillon, and they had:

1. Charles III (1486–1553), who succeeded his half-brother as Duke of Savoy
2. Louis (1488–1502)
3. Philip (1490–1533), duke of Nemours
4. Assolone (1494)
5. Giovanni Amedeo (1495)
6. Philiberta (1498–1524), married Giuliano de' Medici, Duke of Nemours (1479–1516)

=== Illegitimate issue ===
He also had eight illegitimate children by two mistresses.

With Libera Portoneri:

1. René of Savoy (1468 – 31 March 1525), served as Governor of Nice and Provence, known as the Grand Bastard of Savoy and father-in-law of Anne, 1st Duc de Montmorency
2. Antonia of Savoy, married Jean II, Lord of Monaco
3. Peter of Savoy, Bishop of Geneva

With Bona di Romagnano:

1. Claudina (Claudia) of Savoy (d. 2 May 1528), married Jacob III, Count of Horne (d. 15 August 1531).
2. Margherita (Margaret) of Savoy.
3. Giovanna (Johanna) of Savoy.
4. Michele (Michael) of Savoy, a priest

Philip is an ancestor, through an illegitimate daughter of Honorat II of Savoy, of Joséphine de Beauharnais, first wife of Napoleon.

== Ancestry ==
Ancestors of Philip II of Savoy

8. Amadeus VII, Count of Savoy
4. Amadeus VIII, Duke of Savoy
9. Bonne of Berry
2. Louis, Duke of Savoy
10. Philip the Bold
5. Mary of Burgundy
11. Margaret III, Countess of Flanders
1. Philip II, Duke of Savoy
12. James I of Cyprus
6. Janus of Cyprus
13. Helvis of Brunswick-Grubenhagen
3. Anne of Cyprus
14. John I, Count of La Marche
7. Charlotte of Bourbon-La Marche
15. Catherine of Vendôme

== Sources ==
- Cholakian, Patricia Francis; Cholakian, Rouben Charles (2006). Marguerite de Navarre. Columbia University Press.
- Hand, Joni M. (2016). Women, Manuscripts and Identity in Northern Europe, 1350-1550. Routledge.
- Jackson-Laufer, Guida Myrl (1999). Women Rulers Throughout the Ages: An Illustrated Guide. ABC-CLIO.
- Kemp, Martin (2006). Leonardo Da Vinci. Oxford University Press.
- Knecht, R.J. (1982). Francis I. Cambridge University Press.
- Ripart, Laurent (2019). "Le Saint Suaire, les Savoie et Chambery (1453-1515)". In Merlotti, Andrea; Nicolotti, Andrea; Cozzo, Paolo (eds.). The Shroud at Court: History, Usages, Places and Images of a Dynastic Relic (in French). Brill. pp. 57–74. ISBN 9789004390508.
- Vester, Matthew, ed. (2013). Sabaudian Studies: Political Culture, Dynasty, and Territory (1400–1700). Truman State University Press.

Philip II of Savoy House of Savoy Born: 5 February 1438 Died: 7 November 1497
Regnal titles
Preceded by Charles II	Duke of Savoy; 1496–1497	Succeeded by Philibert II
