= Charlie King (Australian footballer) =

Australian rules footballer (1926–2007)

Personal information
- Full name: Charles William King
- Born: 31 July 1926
- Died: 12 September 2007 (aged 81); Caloundra, Queensland
- Original team: Sandhurst
- Height: 178 cm (5 ft 10 in)
- Weight: 82 kg (181 lb)

Playing career^{1}
Years	Club	Games (Goals)
1949	Geelong	6 (0)
- ^{1} Playing statistics correct to the end of 1949.

Charles William King (31 July 1926 – 12 September 2007) was an Australian rules footballer who played with Geelong in the Victorian Football League (VFL). King died in Caloundra, Queensland on 12 September 2007, at the age of 81.
