= Philip, Duke of Nemours =

French nobleman

Philippe, Duke of Nemours
- Born: 1490; Bourg-en-Bresse
- Died: 25 November 1533; Marseille
- Spouse: Charlotte d'Orléans
- House: House of Savoy
- Father: Philip II, Duke of Savoy
- Mother: Claudine de Brosse

Philip of Savoy, Duke of Nemours (1490 – 25 November 1533) was a French nobleman. He was a son of Philip II, Duke of Savoy, and his second wife Claudine de Brosse. He was a half-brother of Louise of Savoy, the mother of Francis I of France. He was the founder of the Nemours branch of the house of Savoy which eventually settled in France.

Originally destined for the priesthood, he was given the bishopric of Geneva at the age of five, but resigned it in 1510, when he was made count of Genevois. He served under Louis XII of France, with whom he was present at the battle of Agnadello (1509), under the emperor Charles V in 1520, and finally under his nephew, Francis I.

In 1528 Francis gave him the duchy of Nemours and married him to Charlotte of Orleans, a daughter of Louis d'Orléans, Duke of Longueville. They had:

- Joanna (1532–1568), who married Nicolas, Duke of Mercœur
- Jacques, Duke of Nemours

== Sources ==
- Oresko, Robert (2004). "Maria Giovanna Basttista of Savoy-Nemours (1644-1724): Daughter, Consort, and Regent of Savoy". In Orr, Clarissa Campbell (ed.). Queenship in Europe 1660-1815: The Role of the Consort. Cambridge University Press. ISBN 9780521814225.
- Potter, David (1995). A History of France, 1460-1560: The Emergence of a Nation State. St. Martin's Press.

Philip, Duke of Nemours House of Savoy Born: 1490 Died: 25 November 1533
Preceded by Louise of Savoy	Duke of Nemours; 1528–1533	Succeeded by Jacques of Savoy
