= Charles III of Savoy =

Duke of Savoy from 1504 to 1553

Charles III
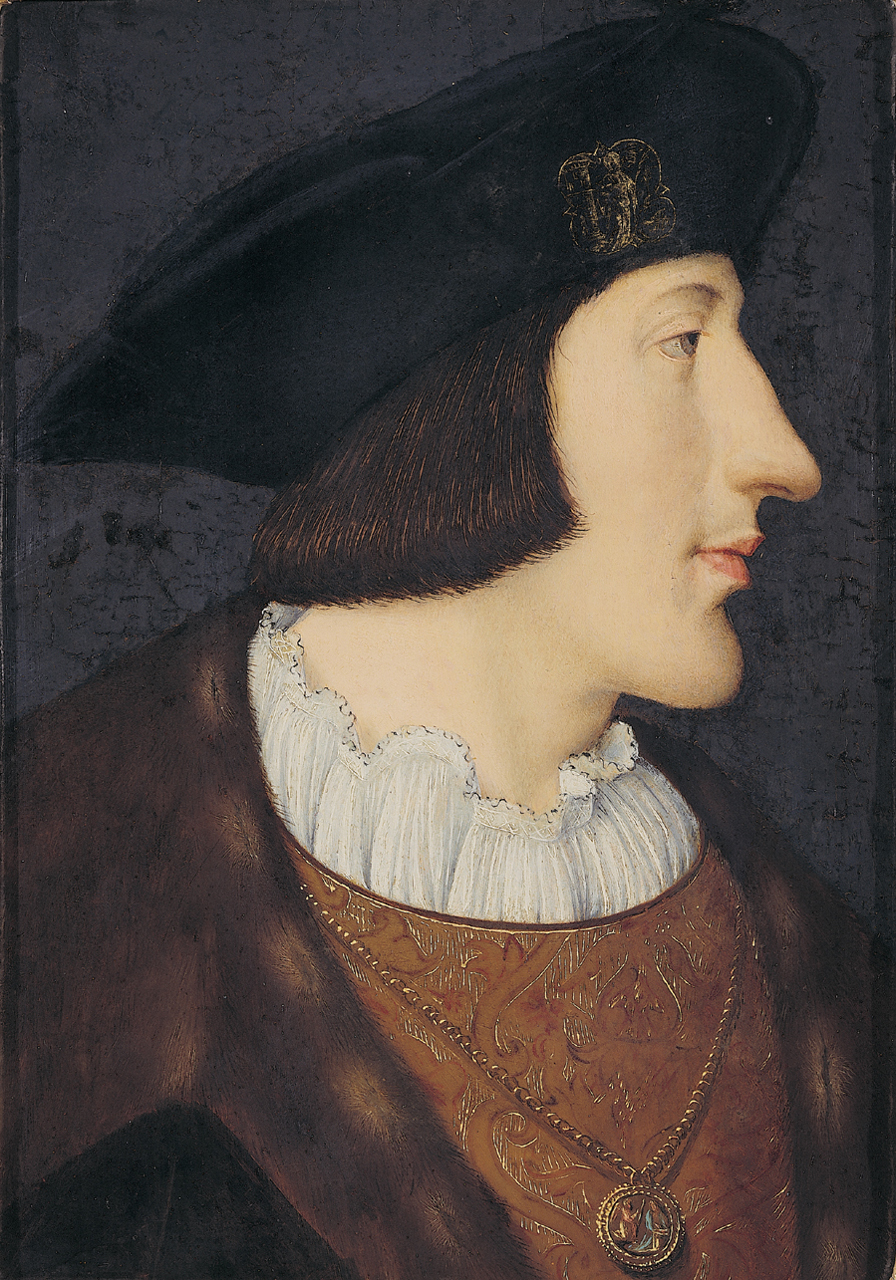
- Portrait attributed to Jean Clouet, c. 1500–1510

Duke of Savoy
- Reign: 10 September 1504 – 17 August 1553
- Predecessor: Philibert II
- Successor: Emmanuel Philibert
- Born: 10 October 1486; Chazey-sur-Ain
- Died: 17 August 1553 (aged 66); Vercelli
- Spouse: Beatrice of Portugal
- Issue see details...: Emmanuel Philibert, Duke of Savoy
- House: Savoy
- Father: Philip ΙΙ the Landless
- Mother: Claudine de Brosse
- Religion: Catholic

Charles III of Savoy (10 October 1486 – 17 August 1553), often called Charles the Good, was Duke of Savoy from 1504 to 1553, although most of his lands were ruled by the French between 1536 and his death. Ruling for nearly 49 years, he is the third longest reigning Savoyard monarch, behind Charles Emmanuel I and Victor Amadeus II.

== Biography ==
Coat of Arms of the Dukes of Savoy

Charles was a younger son of Philip (Filippo) the Landless and Claudine de Brosse. His grandparents were Duke Louis of Savoy and Anne of Cyprus. As a child, there were next to no expectations for him to succeed to any monarchy. He was christened as a namesake of the then-reigning Duke, Charles I of Savoy, the Warrior, his first cousin. However, when he was ten years old, his father unexpectedly succeeded his grandnephew Charles II of Savoy as duke and head of the Savoy dynasty, which had now also received the titles of the kingdoms of Cyprus, Jerusalem and Armenia. However, Charles's father was not the heir general of the deceased duke, only the male heir. Jerusalem, Cyprus and certain other claims and possessions could go to a different heir, and they did, in principle, going to Charles II's sister Yolande Louise. Charles's father was not ready to relinquish those, and he took such titles to his own titulary, staking a claim. He also had Yolande marry his son, Philibert the Handsome, in 1496, to ensure the male line of succession.

In 1497, Charles's half-brother Philibert succeeded their father as Duke of Savoy, etc. Philibert however died childless in 1504, surprisingly, and now Charles succeeded, at age eighteen.

Charles faced down challenges to his authority, including from Philibert Berthelier.

After Yolande's death in 1499, the de jure rights of Jerusalem and Cyprus were lost to the Savoy family. Charles however, as some sort of heir-male, took those titles, which his successors also used. In 1713, Charles's great-great-great-grandson Victor Amadeus II of Savoy received confirmation to that title from the Kings of Spain and France, who also claimed it. The rights, according to succession of heirs general, i.e. not excluding female lines, had gone, until Charles's death, to the House of La Trémoille, the French lords of La Tremoille, Princes of Talmond and Taranto.

In response to the riots between Catholic and Protestants within Geneva, Charles launched a surprise attack in July 1534, but his army was beaten back. A second siege in October 1535 was attempted, and again Charles's army was defeated when forces from Bern arrived to assist Geneva. Charles was allied with the Habsburg camp in Western European politics, where Francis I of France and Emperor Charles V battled for ascendancy. France invaded Savoy in 1536, and held almost all of Charles's possessions. He spent the rest of his life practically in exile, at the mercy of relatives. He died in 1553 and was succeeded by his only surviving child, Emanuele Filiberto.

He was the duke who imprisoned François Bonivard, the "prisoner of Chillon" in 1530.

== Issue ==
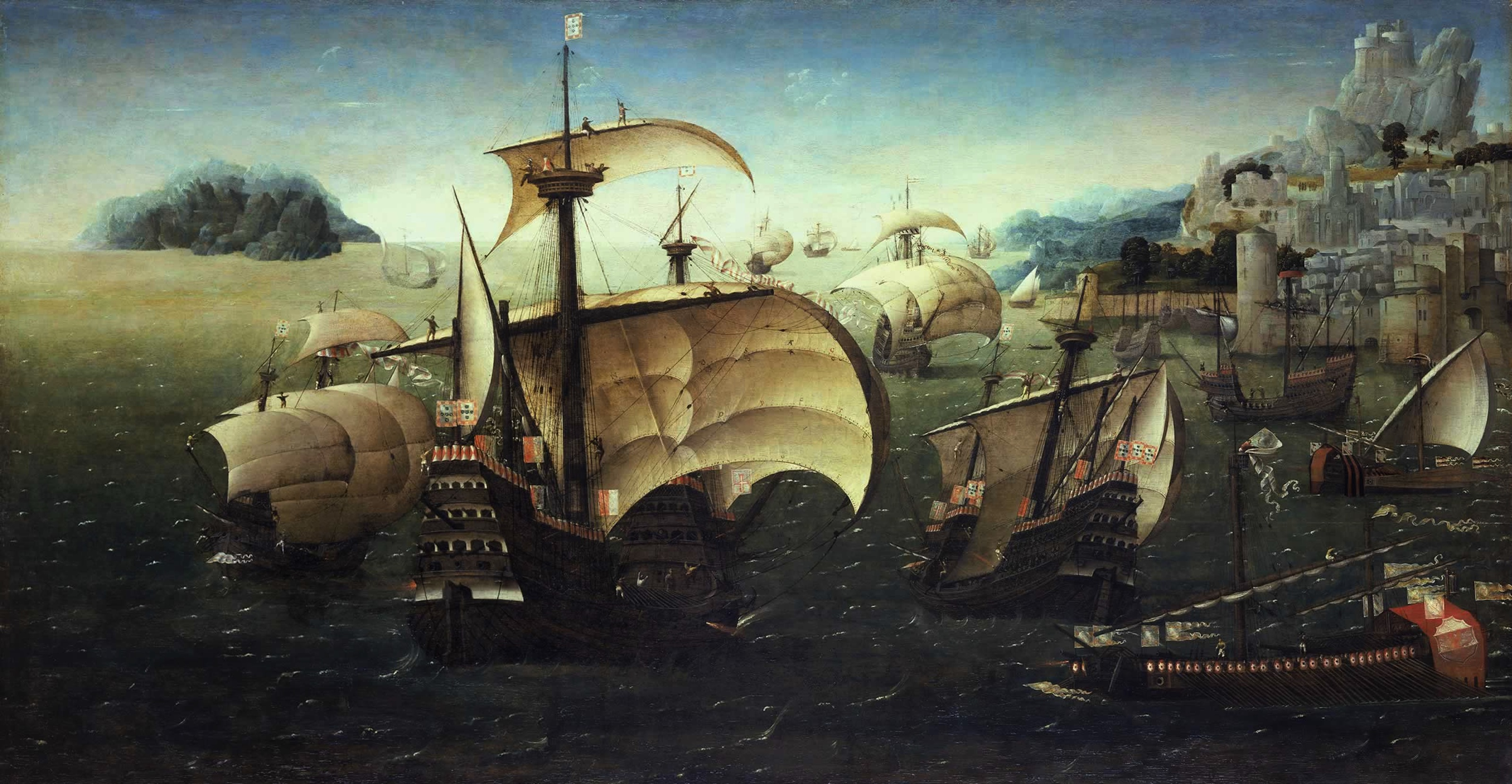
The famed carrack Santa Catarina do Monte Sinai, and other Portuguese ships, carrying the marriage party of Beatrice of Portugal to Savoy, 1521

Charles married the rich, beautiful and ambitious Infanta Beatrice of Portugal, daughter of the richest monarch in Europe at the time, Manuel I of Portugal, and Maria of Aragon. Beatrice was both first cousin and sister-in-law of Emperor Charles V. They had nine children, but only one child, Emmanuel Philibert, would reach adulthood:

- Adriano Giordano Amadeo, Prince of Piedmont (19 November 1522 – 10 January 1523)
- Ludovico, Prince of Piedmont (4 December 1523 – 25 November 1536)
- Emmanuel Philibert, Duke of Savoy (8 July 1528 – 30 August 1580), married Marguerite, Duchess of Berry, sister of Henri II, King of France
- Caterina (25 November 1529 – May 1536)
- Maria (12 June 1530 – 1531)
- Isabella (May 1532 – 24 September 1533)
- Emanuele (May 1533; died young)
- Emanuele (May 1534; died young)
- Gianmaria (3 December 1537 – 8 January 1538)

== Sources ==
- Mallett, Michael; Shaw, Christine (2012). The Italian Wars, 1494–1559. Pearson Educational Limited. ISBN 9781317899389.
- Oresko, Robert (2004). "Maria Giovanna Basttista of Savoy-Nemours (1644-1724): Daughter, Consort, and Regent of Savoy". In Orr, Clarissa Campbell (ed.). Queenship in Europe 1660-1815: The Role of the Consort. Cambridge University Press. ISBN 9780521814225.
- Paas, John Roger (1985). The German Political Broadsheet, 1600–1700: 1600–1615. Otto Harrassowitz. ISBN 978-3447023276.
- Ripart, Laurent (2019). "Le Saint Suaire, les Savoie et Chambery (1453-1515)". In Merlotti, Andrea; Nicolotti, Andrea; Cozzo, Paolo (eds.). The Shroud at Court: History, Usages, Places and Images of a Dynastic Relic (in French). Brill. pp. 57–74. ISBN 9789004390508.

Charles III of Savoy House of Savoy Born: 10 October 1486 Died: 17 August 1553
Regnal titles
Preceded by Philibert II	Duke of Savoy; 1504–1553	Succeeded by Emmanuel Philibert
