= Yolande Louise of Savoy =

Duchess of Savoy from 1497 to 1499

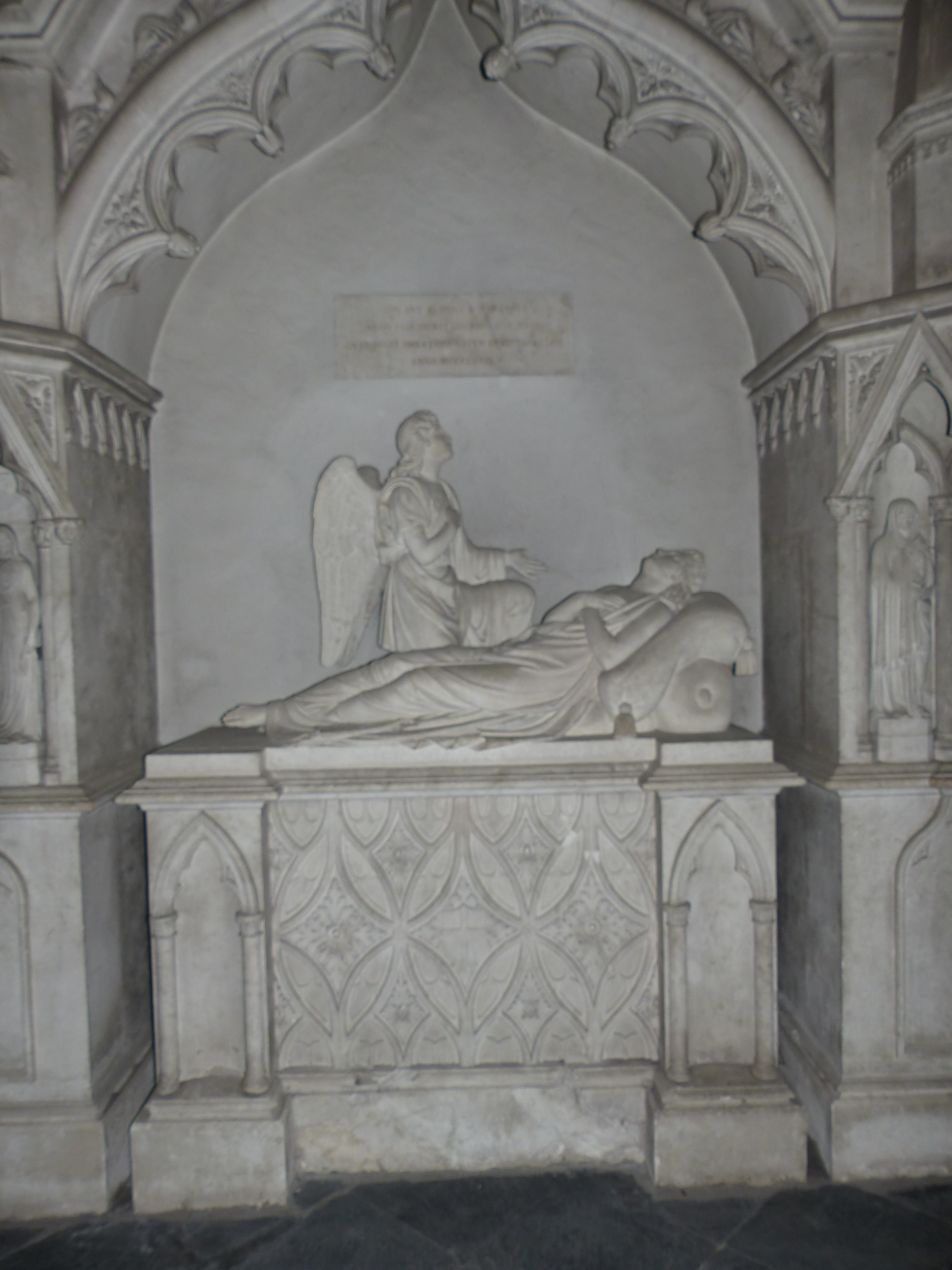
- Cenotaph of Yolande-Louise de Savoie to Hautecombe Abbey

Duchess consort of Savoy
- Tenure: 7 November 1497 – 1499
- Born: 1487
- Died: 1499 (aged 11–12)
- Spouse: Philibert II, Duke of Savoy
- House: Savoy
- Father: Charles I, Duke of Savoy
- Mother: Blanche of Montferrat

Yolande Louise of Savoy (1487–1499) was Duchess of Savoy as the wife of Philibert II, Duke of Savoy.

== Biography ==
She was daughter of Duke Charles I of Savoy, the Warrior, and Blanche of Montferrat, as well as granddaughter of Philibert's late uncle, Duke Amedeo IX of Savoy. She was the heir-general of her brother, father, grandfather, and also grandmother Yolande of France, the eldest surviving daughter of King Charles VII of France. Her birth-right, after the death of her brother, was the succession of the kingdoms of Cyprus and Jerusalem, although Philibert's father took those titles.

In 1496, her brother Duke Charles II of Savoy died childless, being the male heir of the line of Savoy, and her uncle became sovereign. The same year, she was married to Philibert, her cousin and the new heir to the throne. The marriage produced no heirs.

Next year, Philibert's father died and he succeeded as Duke of Savoy. The couple then advanced their claims and took the titles Queen and King of Cyprus, Jerusalem and Armenia.

In 1499, the 12-year-old died, childless. Her heir was her first cousin, Princess Charlotte of Naples, later Countess of Laval. Philibert continued to use the titles of Cyprus etc., despite the death of his first wife.

== In fiction ==
She is the subject of a novel by Maud Stricane: L'oubliée de Hautecombe (2005)

== Sources ==
- Scott, John Beldon (2003). Architecture for the Shroud, Relic and Ritual in Turin. University of Chicago Press.

Yolande Louise of Savoy House of Savoy Born: c. 1487 Died: 1499
Titles in pretence
Preceded by Charles II of Savoy	— TITULAR — Queen of Jerusalem, Cyprus, and Armenia; 16 April 1496 – 1499	Succeeded by Charlotte of Naples
