= Charles V =

Charles V may refer to:

== Kings and Emperors ==
- Charles V, Holy Roman Emperor (1500–1558)
- Charles V of Naples (1661–1700), better known as Charles II of Spain
- Charles V of Sicily (1716–1788), better known as Charles III of Spain
- Charles V of France (1338–1380), called the Wise

== Others ==
- Charles V, Duke of Lorraine (1643–1690)
- Charles Egon V, Prince of Fürstenberg (1891–1973)
- Infante Carlos of Spain, Count of Molina (1788–1855), first Carlist pretender to the throne of Spain (as Charles V)

== See also ==
- Karl V. (opera)
- Carlos V (chocolate bar)
- King Charles (disambiguation)
- Charles
