= Blanche of Montferrat =

Duchess of Savoy

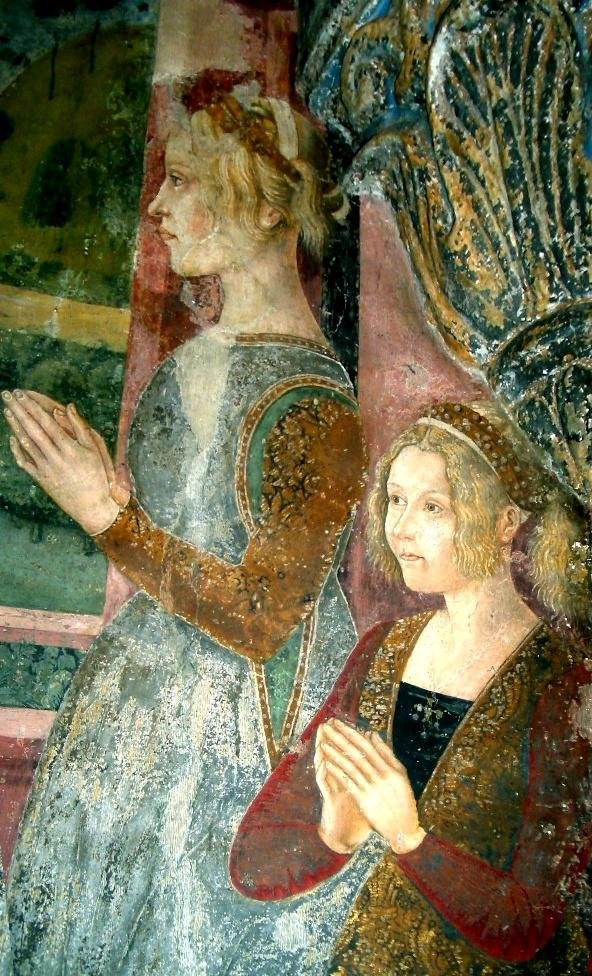
- Blanche, on the left, and her older sister, Giovanna

Duchess consort of Savoy
- Born: 1472
- Died: 30 March 1519 (Aged 46-47)
- Burial: Church of the Blessed Virgin in Carignano
- Spouse: Charles I, Duke of Savoy
- Issue: Yolande Louise of Savoy; Charles II, Duke of Savoy
- House: Palaeologus-Montferrat
- Father: William VIII, Marquis of Montferrat
- Mother: Elisabetta Sforza

Blanche of Montferrat (Italian: Bianca di Monferrato; 1472 – 30 March 1519) was Duchess of Savoy as the wife of Charles I of Savoy. She acted as regent for her only son Charles from 1490 until his accidental death in 1496.

== Life ==
Blanche was the eldest daughter of Marquess William VIII Palaiologos of Montferrat and Elisabetta Sforza, daughter of Duke Francesco I Sforza of Milan and Bianca Maria Visconti, after whom Blanche was named. Her mother Elisabetta died at age 17 when Blanche was less than a year old.

Her father then remarried to Bernarde de Brosse.

== Marriage ==
On 1 April 1485, Blanche married her second cousin, Duke Charles I of Savoy. The marriage produced two surviving children:

- A stillborn son (September 1486)
- Yolande Louise of Savoy (2 July 1487 – 13 September 1499), married Philibert II of Savoy; died childless at the age of 12.
- A son (born and died in May 1488)
- Charles II, Duke of Savoy (23 June 1489 – 16 April 1496).
- A daughter (born and died in March 1490)

== Regency ==
After the death of her husband in 1490, Blanche gave birth to her youngest child, who did not survive. She then acted as regent for her young son, Charles, who had succeeded his father in his regnal and titular titles. She remained the ruler of Savoy until her son, who was seven years old at the time, was accidentally killed in a fall at Moncalieri. Her surviving child Yolande fell ill and died three years later, without having produced any children; therefore Blanche's line became extinct.

In December 1518, Blanche fell seriously ill, possibly with tuberculosis. In her will dated 12 February 1519, she named her choice of burial place which was the chapel of the Church of the Blessed Virgin in Carignano.

== Sources ==
- Denieul-Cormier, Anne (1968). A Time of Glory: The Renaissance in France, 1488-1559. Doubleday & Company, Inc.
- Jansen, S. (2002). The Monstrous Regiment of Women: Female Rulers in Early Modern Europe. Palgrave Macmillan.
