= Philibert II of Savoy =

Duke of Savoy from 1497 to 1504

Philibert II
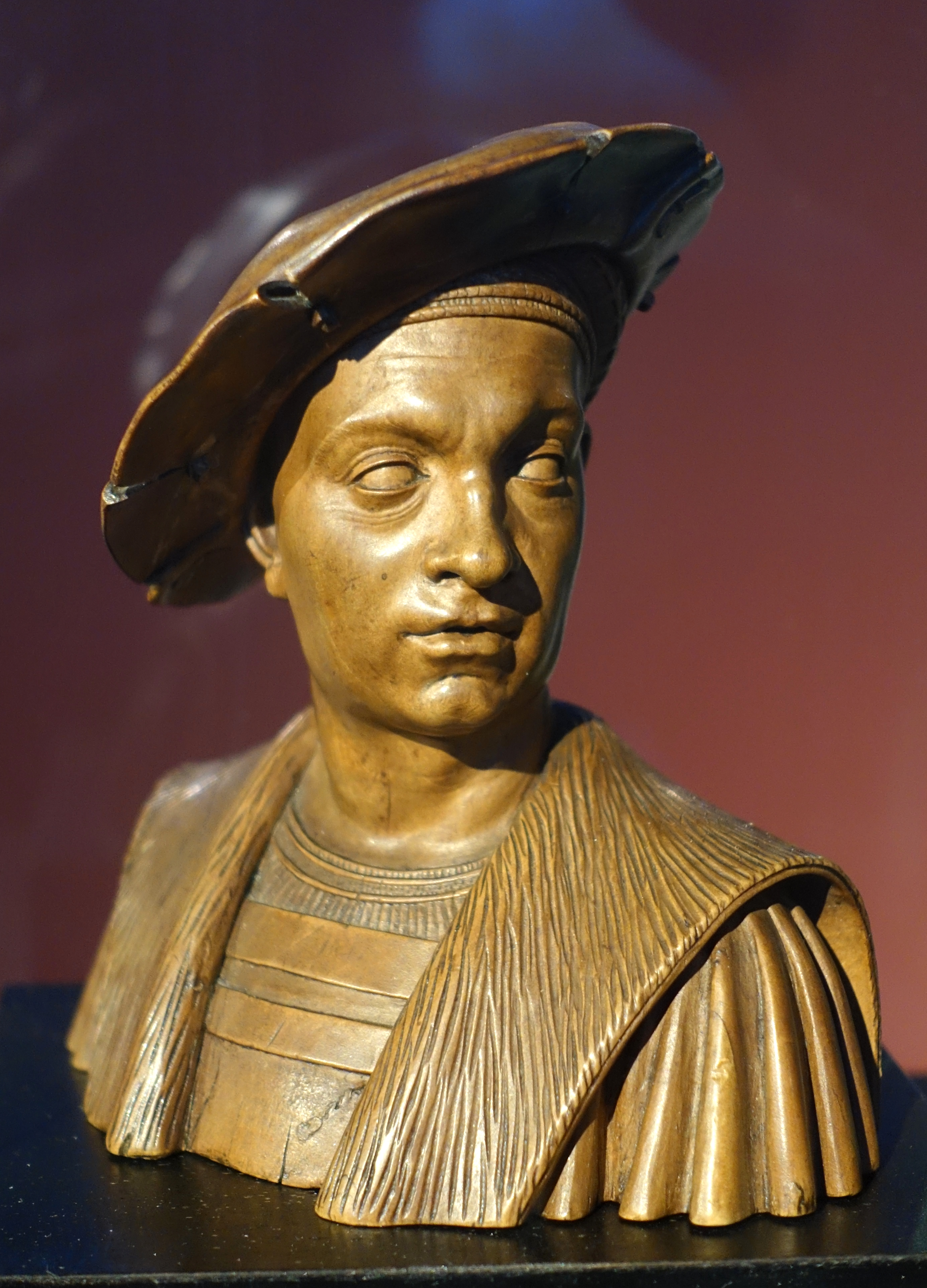
- Walnut wood bust by Conrad Meit, between 1515–1525

Duke of Savoy
- Reign: 7 November 1497 – 10 September 1504
- Predecessor: Philip II
- Successor: Charles III
- Born: 10 April 1480; Pont-d'Ain
- Died: 10 September 1504 (aged 24)
- Spouses: Yolande Louise of Savoy; Margaret of Austria
- House: Savoy
- Father: Philip II of Savoy
- Mother: Marguerite of Bourbon

Philibert II (10 April 1480 – 10 September 1504), nicknamed the Handsome or the Good, was the Duke of Savoy from 1497 until his death.

== Biography ==
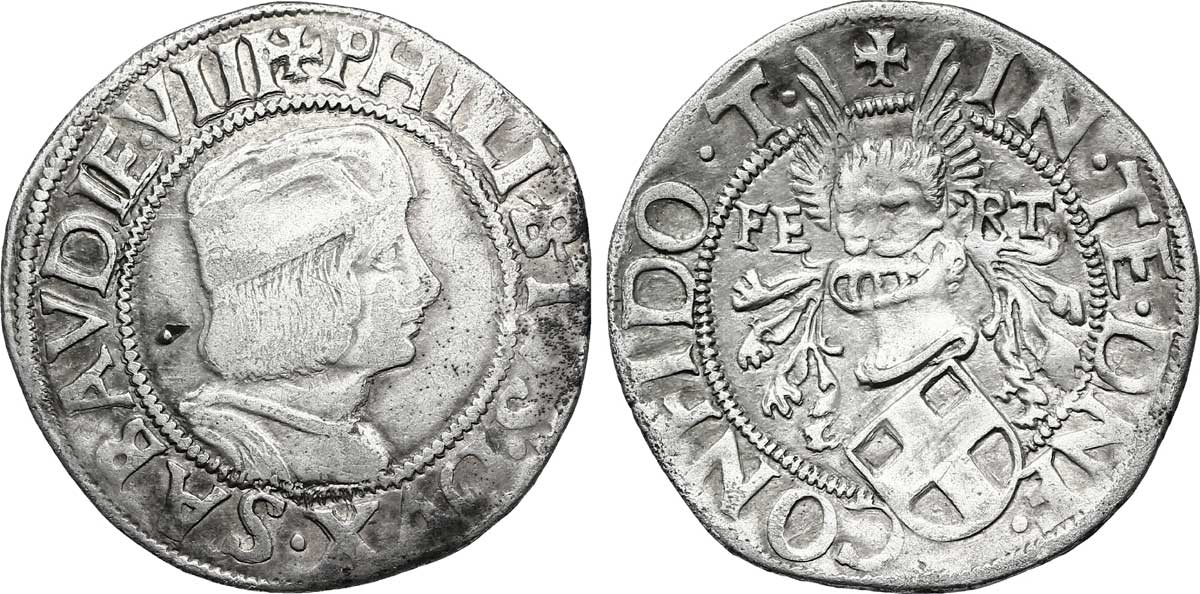
Philibert II, duke of Savoy, 1500

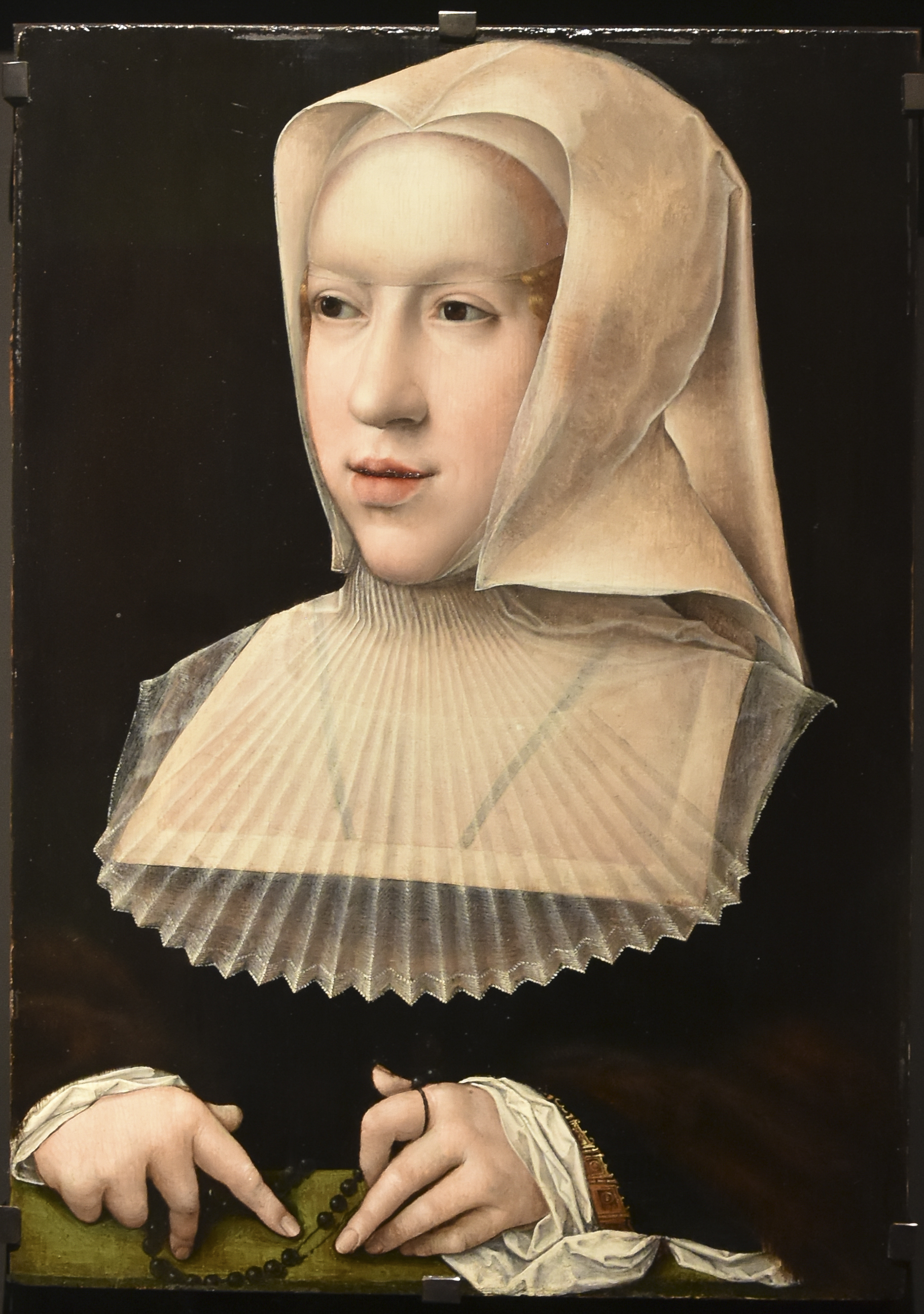
Margaret of Austria as a widow by Bernard van Orley

Born in Pont-d'Ain, Philibert was the son of Philip (Filippo) the Landless and his first wife Marguerite of Bourbon. In 1496, Philibert's father surprisingly succeeded as Duke, when his underaged grandnephew Duke Charles II of Savoy died, being the male heir of the line of Savoy.

The same year, the 16-year-old Philibert married the 9-year-old Yolande Louise of Savoy, his cousin and the only sister of the deceased young duke. She was daughter of Duke Charles I of Savoy, the Warrior, and Blanche of Montferrat, as well as granddaughter of Philibert's late uncle, Duke Amadeus IX of Savoy. She was the heir-general of her brother, father, grandfather, and her grandmother Yolande of France, the eldest surviving daughter of king Charles VII of France. Her birthright, after the death of her brother, was the succession of the kingdoms of Cyprus, Jerusalem, and Armenia although Philibert's father took those titles.

Coat of Arms of the Dukes of Savoy.

After a brief reign, Philip II died in 1497 and Philibert succeeded as Duke of Savoy. The young couple then at last advanced their claims, and took the titles Queen and King of Cyprus, Jerusalem and Armenia.

In 1499, the 12-year-old first wife of Philibert died, childless. Her heir was her first cousin, Princess Charlotte of Naples, later Countess of Laval. Philibert continued to use the titles of Cyprus etc., despite the death of his first wife.

His next marriage tied him into the web of alliances around the Habsburgs, who ruled the Netherlands, Alsace, Franche-Comté, Tyrol, Austria, etc. In 1501, he married Margaret of Austria, the only daughter of Maximilian I and his first wife Mary of Burgundy, the duchess of Burgundy. She had previously been married to John, Prince of Asturias, heir to the thrones of Aragon and Castile.

Early in Philibert's reign, his first cousin Charles VIII of France died in 1498. The next king, Louis XII, would invade Italy the following year and conquer most of Naples. Louis would also conquer Milan, which neighboured Savoy to the east, thus putting the Savoyards between French possessions.

Philibert died in 1504 at the age of 24. Because he had no children, he was succeeded by his young half-brother Charles III.

== Family ==
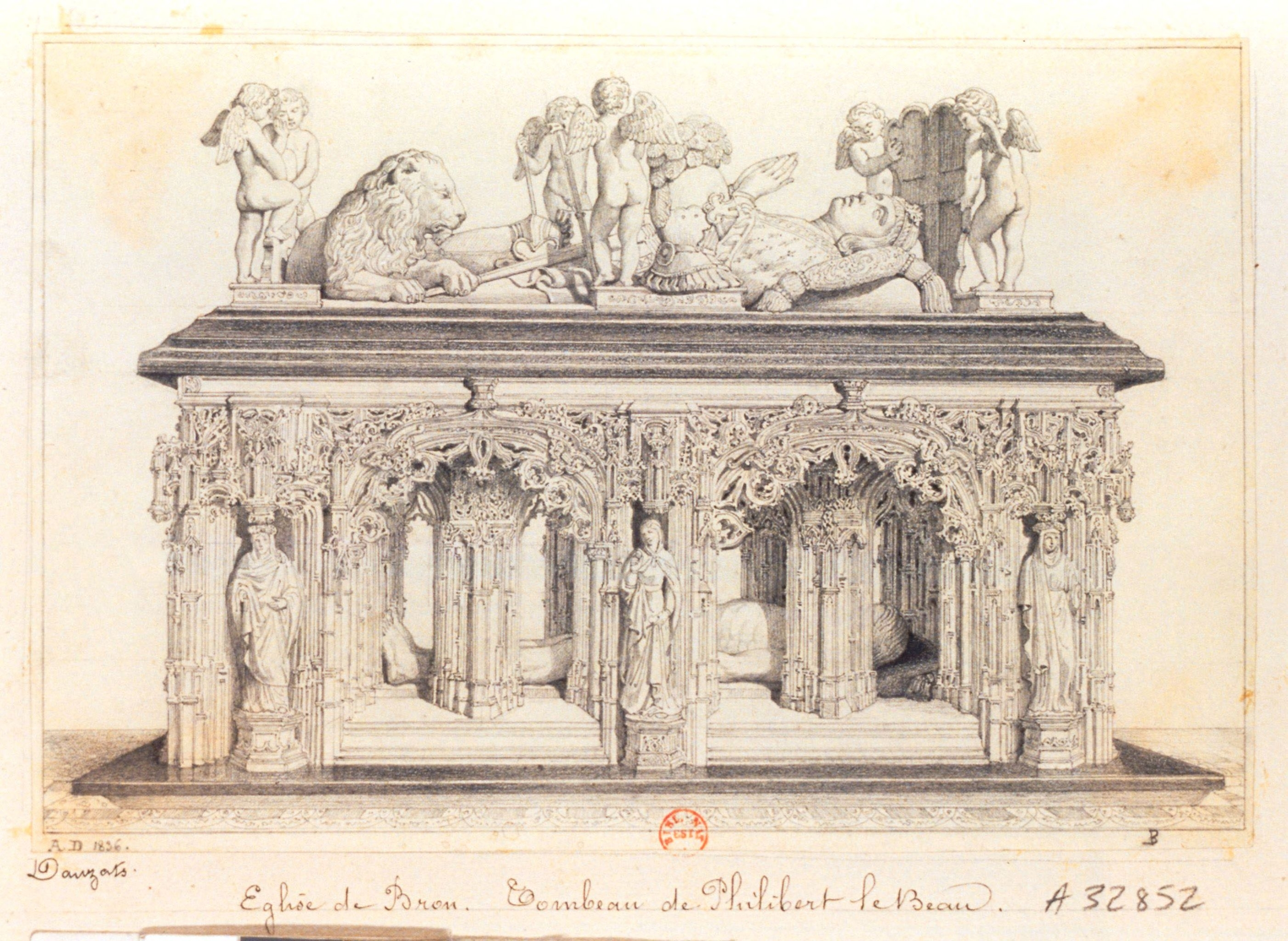
Tomb of Philibert, as sketched by Adrian Dauzats in 1836, at the Eglise de Brou

Philibert married:

1. Yolande Louise of Savoy (1487–1499), daughter of his first cousin, Charles I of Savoy.
2. Margaret of Austria, Duchess of Savoy who was Governor of the Seventeen Provinces of the Netherlands (1507–1515, 1519–1530) and the daughter of Maximilian I and Mary of Burgundy. There were no children from this marriage.

== Sources ==
- Hand, Joni M. (2013). Women, Manuscripts and Identity in Northern Europe, 1350-1550. Ashgate Publishing.
- Scott, John Beldon (2003). Architecture for the Shroud, Relic and Ritual in Turin. University of Chicago Press.
- Ward, A.W.; Prothero, G.W.; Leathes, Stanley, eds. (1934). The Cambridge Modern History. Vol. XIII. Cambridge at the University Press.

Philibert II of Savoy House of Savoy Born: 10 April 1480 Died: 10 September 1504
Regnal titles
Preceded by Philip II	Duke of Savoy; 1497–1504	Succeeded by Charles III
