= Billiat =

Commune in Auvergne-Rhône-Alpes, France

- Commune
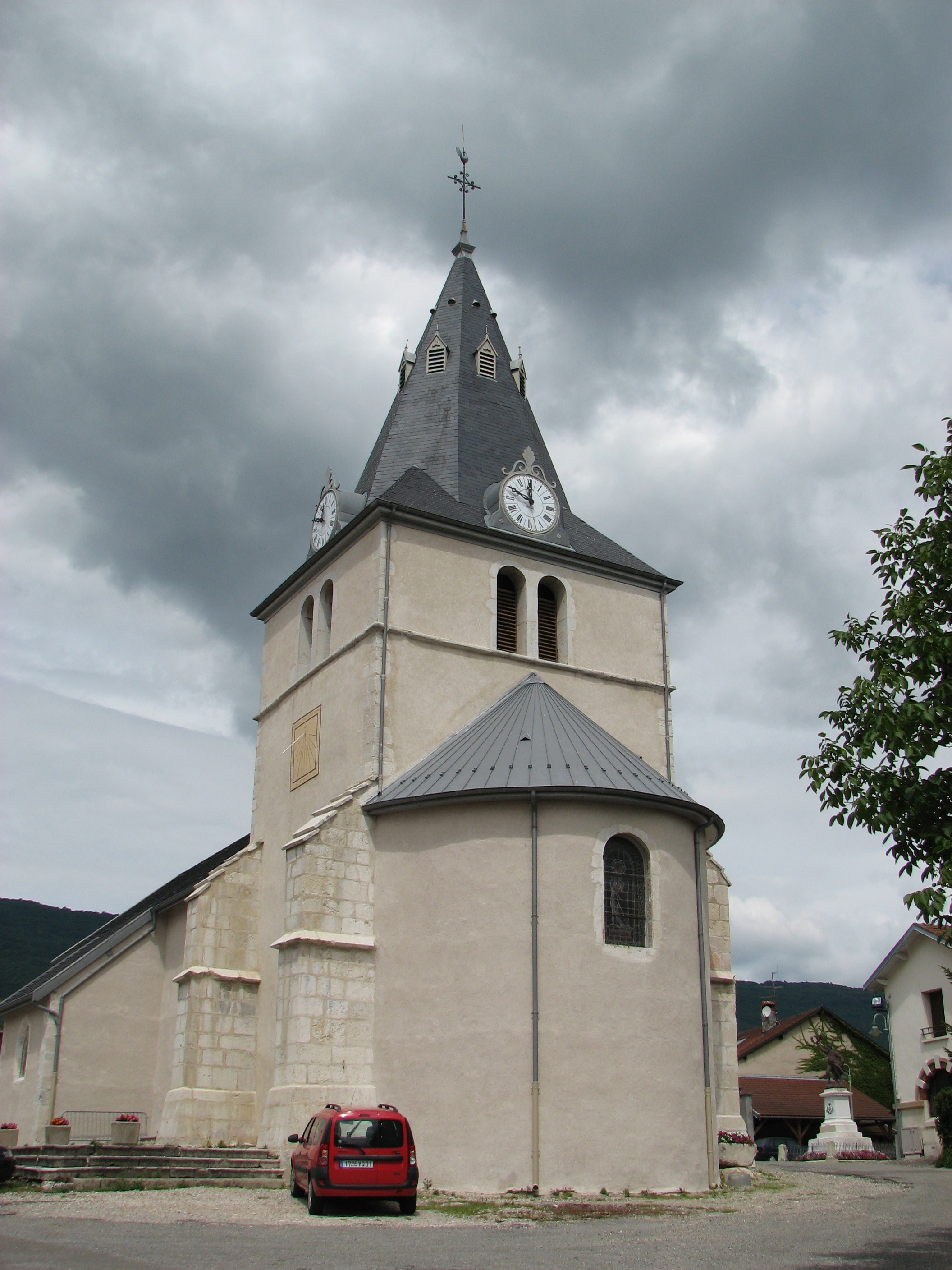
- Location of Billiat
- Location within France Location within Auvergne-Rhône-Alpes
- Coordinates: 46°04′00″N 5°47′00″E
- Country: France
- Region: Auvergne-Rhône-Alpes
- Department: Ain
- Arrondissement: Nantua
- Canton: Valserhône
- Intercommunality: Terre Valserhône

Government
  - Mayor (2026–32): Jean Marc Beauquis
- Area^{1}: 13.70 km^{2} (5.29 sq mi)
- Elevation: 500 m (1,600 ft)
- Highest elevation: 1,300 m (4,300 ft)
- Lowest elevation: 370 m (1,210 ft)
- Population (2023): 713
  - Density: 52.0/km^{2} (135/sq mi)
- Time zone: UTC+01:00 (CET)
  - Summer (DST): UTC+02:00 (CEST)
- INSEE/Postal code: 01044 /01200
- ^{1} French Land Register data, which excludes lakes, ponds, glaciers > 1 km^{2} (0.386 sq mi or 247 acres) and river estuaries.

Billiat (French pronunciation: [bilja]) is a commune in the Ain department in central-eastern France.

== Population ==
Historical population
Year	Pop.	±% p.a.
1968	216	—
1975	293	+4.45%
1982	348	+2.49%
1990	396	+1.63%
1999	411	+0.41%
2007	444	+0.97%
2012	547	+4.26%
2017	622	+2.60%
2023	713	+2.30%
Source: INSEE

== See also ==
- Communes of the Ain department
