= Charles I of Savoy =

Duke of Savoy from 1482 to 1490

Charles I
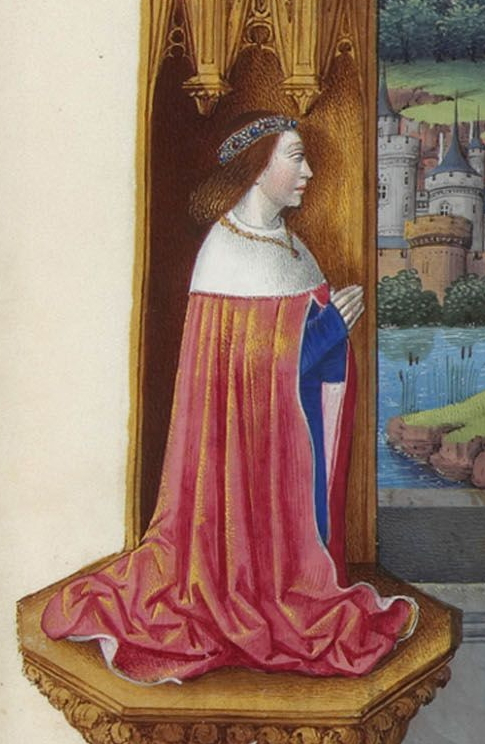
- Charles in the Très Riches Heures du Duc de Berry by Jean Colombe, c. 1486

Duke of Savoy
- Reign: 22 September 1482 – 13 March 1490
- Predecessor: Philibert I
- Successor: Charles II
- Born: 28 March 1468; Carignano, Piedmont, Duchy of Savoy
- Died: 13 March 1490 (aged 21); Pinerolo, Duchy of Savoy
- Spouse: Blanche of Montferrat
- Issue: Yolande Louise of Savoy; Charles II, Duke of Savoy
- House: Savoy
- Father: Amadeus IX
- Mother: Yolande of Valois

Coat of Arms of the Dukes of Savoy

Charles I (28 March 1468 – 13 March 1490), called the Warrior, was the Duke of Savoy from 1482 to 1490 and titular king of Cyprus, Jerusalem, and Armenia from 1485 to 1490.

== Life ==
Charles was the son of Amadeus IX, Duke of Savoy, and Yolande of Valois, the daughter of king Charles VII of France.

Charles was 17 when Charlotte of Cyprus, titular queen of Armenia and Jerusalem, surrendered her rights to Cyprus, Armenia, and Jerusalem to him. He was the next legitimate heir in line from King Janus of Cyprus and Armenia. The kingdom itself was held by the Republic of Venice, but the Savoy dynasty continued to claim it.

== Family ==
Charles married his second cousin Blanche Palaiologina (Bianca di Monferrato) (1472–1519), daughter of William VIII, Marquess of Montferrat, and Elisabetta Sforza.

After Charles died from tuberculosis, Blanche was regent of the Duchy of Savoy from 1490 to 1496. They had:

1. Yolande Louise of Savoy (1487–1499), married Philibert II of Savoy
2. Charles John Amadeus of Savoy (1489–1496)

== Sources ==
- Boase, Roger (2017). Secrets of Pinar's Game: Court Ladies and Courtly Verse in Fifteenth-Century Spain. Vol. 1. Brill.
- Denieul-Cormier, Anne (1969). A Time of Glory: The Renaissance in France, 1488-1559. Doubleday.
- Hand, Joni M. (2013). Women, Manuscripts and Identity in Northern Europe, 1350-1550. Ashgate.
- Hill, George (1948). A History of Cyprus. Vol. The Frankish Period, 1432–1571. Cambridge University Press.

Charles I of Savoy House of Savoy Born: 29 March 1468 Died: 13 March 1490
Preceded by Philibert I	Duke of Savoy; 1482–1490	Succeeded by Charles II
Preceded by Charlotte	— TITULAR — King of Armenia, Cyprus and Jerusalem; 1485–1490	Succeeded by Charles II
