= Charles II of Savoy =

Duke of Savoy from 1490 to 1496

Charles II
- Coinage of Charles II, c. 1490–96

Duke of Savoy
- Reign: 13 March 1490 – 16 April 1496
- Predecessor: Charles I
- Successor: Philip II
- Born: 23 June 1489; Turin, Piedmont, Duchy of Savoy
- Died: 16 April 1496 (aged 6); Moncalieri, Duchy of Savoy
- House: Savoy
- Father: Charles I
- Mother: Blanche of Montferrat

Charles II or Charles John Amadeus (Carlo Giovanni Amedeo in Italian; c.1489, Turin, Piedmont – 1496), was the Duke of Savoy from 1490 to 1496 but his mother Blanche of Montferrat (1472–1519) was the actual ruler as a regent. In 1485 his father Charles I had received the hereditary rights to the Kingdoms of Cyprus, Jerusalem, and Armenia which were inherited by young Charles.

== Biography ==
Born in Turin, Charles John was the son of Charles I of Savoy and Blanche of Montferrat. During his reign, Charles VIII of France invaded Italy and conquered Naples; and the House of Savoy, under Blanche's regency, allowed Charles free passage through the duchy.

Coat of Arms of the Dukes of Savoy

Charles John died in Moncalieri at about seven, falling by his bed. His duchy was therefore inherited by his granduncle Philip II (reigned 1496–1497), the male heir of the Savoy line. Charles's heir-general was his underage sister Violante Ludovica, who was married to Philip's eldest son Philibert the Handsome. Violante however died in 1499, 12 years old and childless, leaving the 18-year-old Philibert (who had succeeded his elderly father as Duke in 1497) a widower.

== Sources ==
- Boase, Roger (2017). Secrets of Pinar's Game: Court Ladies and Courtly Verse in Fifteenth-Century Spain. Vol. 1. Brill. ISBN 9789004338364.
- Mallett, Michael; Shaw, Christine (2012). The Italian Wars, 1494–1559. Pearson Education Limited. ISBN 978-0-582-05758-6.
- Vester, Matthew, ed. (2013). Sabaudian Studies: Political Culture, Dynasty, and Territory (1400–1700). Truman State University Press. ISBN 978-1-61248-094-7.

Charles II of Savoy House of Savoy Born: 23 June 1489 Died: 16 April 1496
Regnal titles
Preceded by Charles I	Duke of Savoy; 1490–1496	Succeeded by Philip II
Titles in pretence
Preceded by Charles I	— TITULAR — King of Armenia; King of Cyprus; King of Jerusalem; 1490–1496	Succeeded by Philip II
Preceded by Charles I	— TITULAR — King of Armenia; King of Cyprus; King of Jerusalem; 1490–1496	Succeeded by Yolande Louise
