= Isabel Luísa, Princess of Beira =

Portuguese infanta (1669–1690)

Isabel Luísa
- Princess of Beira
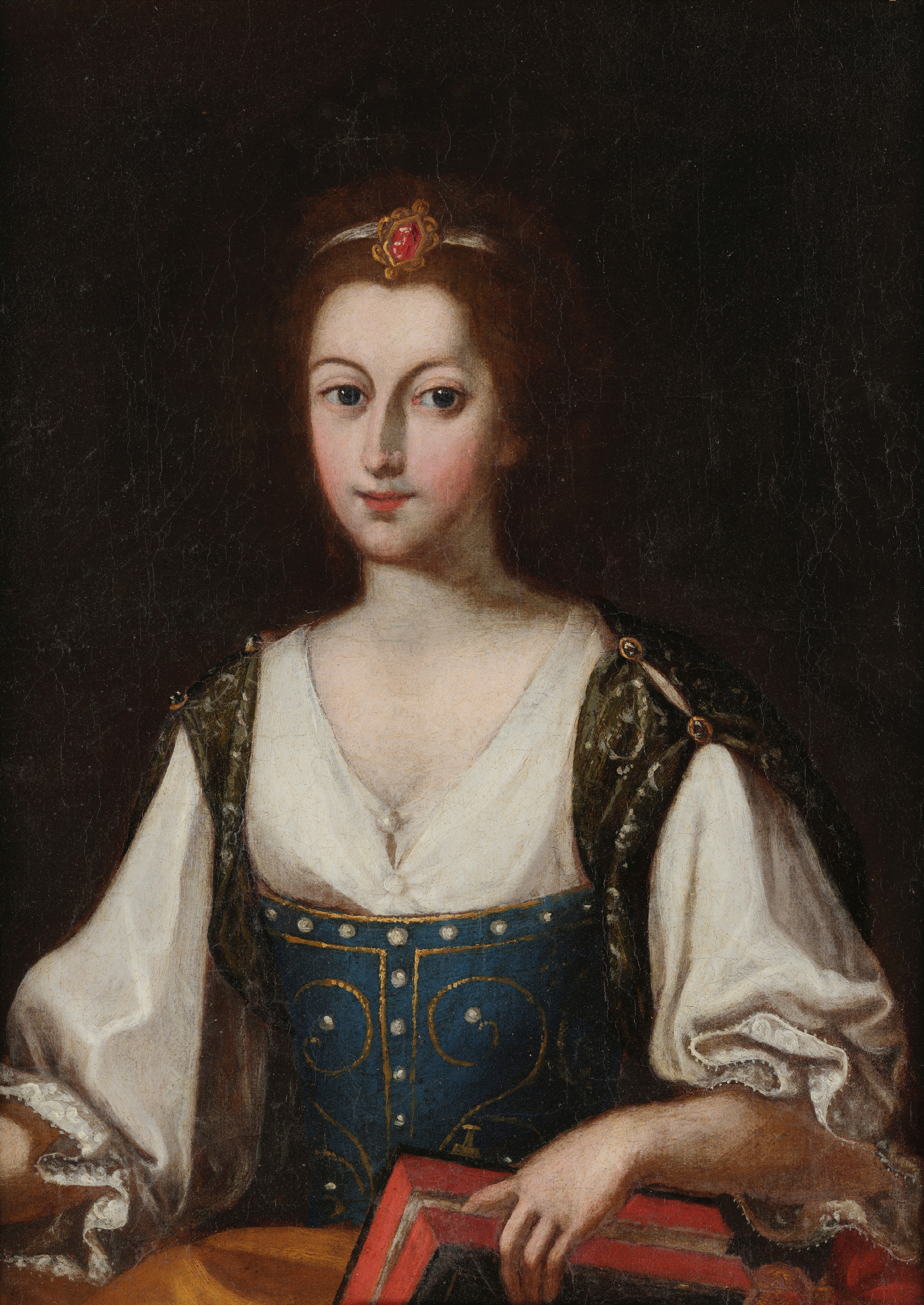
- Portrait, c. 1680
- Born: 6 January 1669; Ribeira Palace, Lisbon, Kingdom of Portugal
- Died: 21 October 1690 (aged 21); Palhavã, Lisbon, Kingdom of Portugal
- Burial: Royal Pantheon of the Braganza Dynasty
Names
- Isabel Luísa Josefa
- House: House of Braganza
- Father: Peter II of Portugal
- Mother: Maria Francisca of Savoy

Infanta Isabel Luísa Josefa of Portugal (6 January 1669 – 21 October 1690) was the only child of Peter II of Portugal and his first wife and former sister-in-law, Maria Francisca of Savoy. She was the heiress presumptive to the throne of Portugal between 1674 and 1689, when her half-brother John was born. As such, she was styled Princess of Beira.

== Biography ==
Isabel Luísa was the only child of Peter II of Portugal and his first wife, the French born Princess Marie Françoise of Savoy. She was born at the Ribeira Palace, Lisbon, in 1669. Louis XIV sent a special envoy to congratulate her birth.

At age five, Isabel Luísa was declared heir presumptive to the Portuguese throne during the 1674 Cortes.

=== Marriage prospects ===
It was planned that she would marry Victor Amadeus II of Savoy, a first cousin through her aunt Marie Jeanne, Duchess of Savoy, then regent for her son. The marriage was opposed by most of the Savoyard court as it meant that Victor Amadeus would live in Portugal and his mother would remain in power. But that plan was not implemented.

Other proposed candidates included Gian Gastone de' Medici (future Grand Duke of Tuscany), Louis, Grand Dauphin son of Louis XIV, Charles II of Spain, the Duke of Parma as well as a Count Palatine of Neuburg. Nothing came of these plans. For this she was nicknamed Sempre-noiva, "Always-engaged".

=== Death and burial ===
She died of smallpox at Palhavã in 1690, when she was 21 years old. Isabel Luísa is buried at the Monastery of São Vicente de Fora in Lisbon after being moved from the Convent of the Francesinhas.

== Ancestry ==
Ancestors of Isabel Luísa, Princess of Beira

8. Teodósio II, Duke of Braganza
4. John IV of Portugal
9. Ana de Velasco y Girón
2. Peter II of Portugal
10. Manuel, 8th Duke of Medina Sidonia
5. Luisa de Guzmán
11. Juana de Sandoval y de la Cerda
1. Isabel Luísa, Princess of Beira
12. Henri I, Duke of Nemours
6. Charles Amadeus, Duke of Nemours
13. Anne, Duchess of Aumale
3. Maria Francisca of Savoy
14. César, Duke of Vendôme
7. Élisabeth de Bourbon
15. Françoise of Lorraine

== Sources ==
- Livermore, H.V. (1969). A New History of Portugal. Cambridge University Press. ISBN 9780521095716.
- McMurdo, Edward (1889). The history of Portugal, from the Commencement of the Monarchy to the Reign of Alfonso III. London: Sampson Low, Marston, Searle, & Rivington.
