= Palazzo Madama =

Palazzo Madama might refer to:

- Palazzo Madama, Rome
- Palazzo Madama, Turin
