= D. Pedro II =

D. Pedro II may refer to:

- Peter II of Portugal (1648–1706), King of Portugal and the Algarves
- Pedro II of Brazil (1825–1891), second and last Emperor of Brazil
