= Bartolomeo Guidobono =

Italian painter (1654–1709)

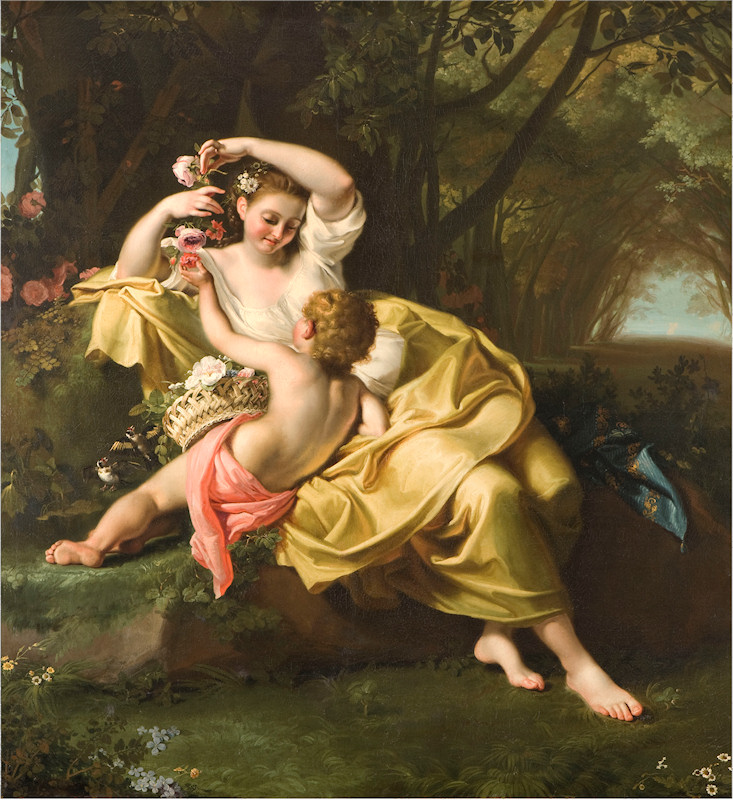
Allegoria della Primavera (Fondazione Cariplo)

Bartolomeo Guidobono (1654–1709) was an Italian painter known for his scenes with angelic looking figures bathing in soft lighting, which show the influence of Correggio. His elegant and graceful style was very popular in Genoa. He is also known as il Prete di Savona (Priest of Savona) or Prete Bartolomeo da Savona (Priest Bartolomeo of Savona).

== Life ==
Guidobono was born in Savona as the son of Giovanni Antonio Guidobono, a maiolica painter. His brother Domenico was a decorative fresco painter. Bartolomeo began as a painter of ceramic earthenware with his father, who worked for the royal court of Savoy. He afterwards went to work as a copyist to Parma, Venice, and Genoa.

Guidobono died in Turin on 4 January 1709.

== Work ==
He appears to have modeled his style on Northern influences such as Gaudenzio Ferrari and Corregio as well as on Caravaggio.

He was admired for his decoration of ornamental parts, such as flowers, fruits, and animals. He helped fresco the Palazzo Centurioni in Genoa. He painted an Inebriation of Lot and in three other subjects for the Palace Brignole Sale. His brother Domenico (1670–1746) helped paint the Duomo of Turin with a glory of angels.

== Other projects ==
Media related to Bartolomeo Guidobono at Wikimedia Commons
