= Maria Francisca of Savoy =

Queen of Portugal from 1666 to 1668 and again in 1683

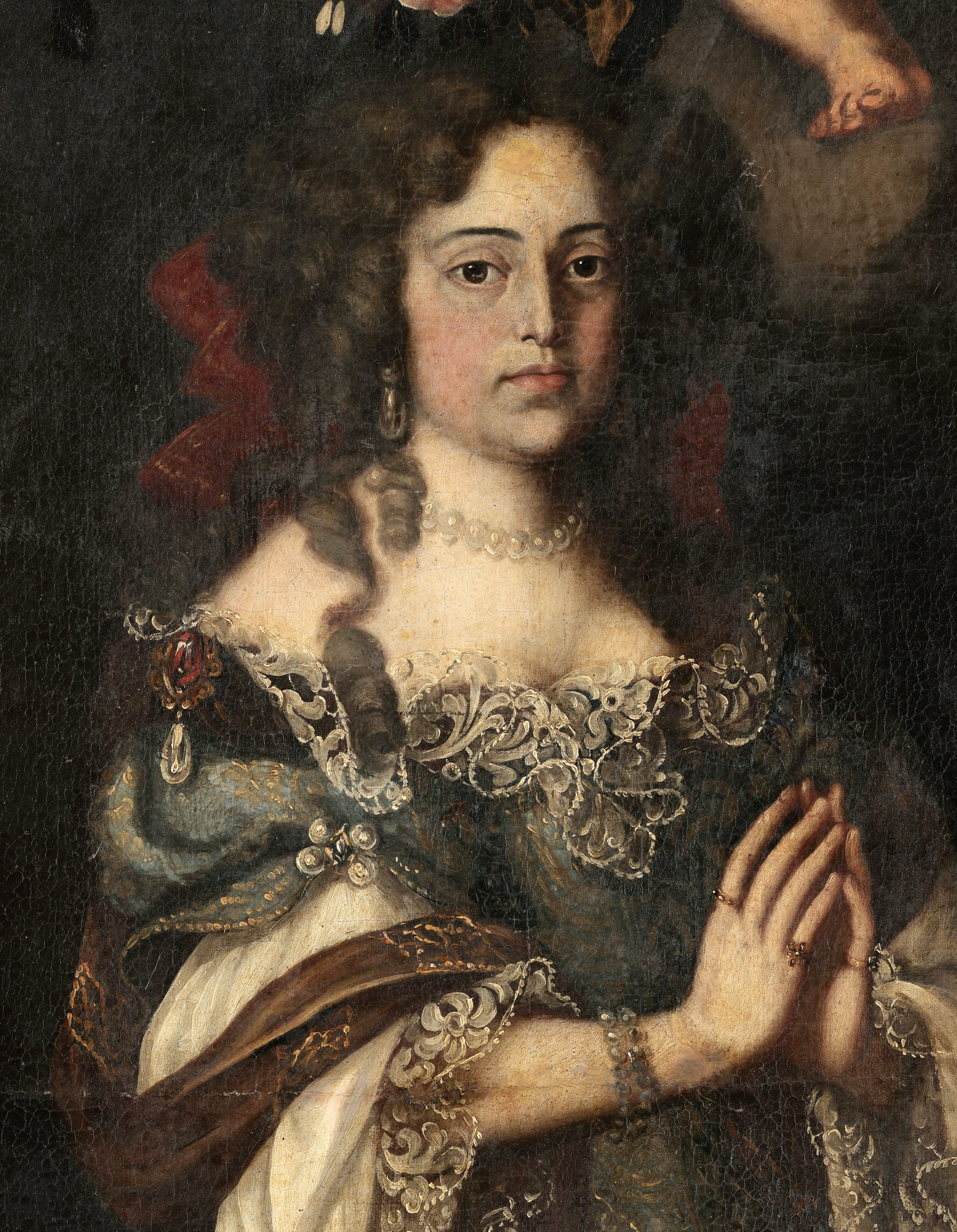
- Portrait by Josefa de Óbidos

Queen consort of Portugal
- Tenure: 12 September 1683 – 27 December 1683
- Tenure: 2 August 1666 – 24 March 1668
- Born: 21 June 1646; Hôtel de Nemours, Paris, France
- Died: 27 December 1683 (aged 37); Palhavã, Lisbon, Portugal
- Burial: Pantheon of the Braganzas
- Spouses: Afonso VI of Portugal (m. 1666; ann. 1668) Peter II of Portugal (m. 1668)
- Issue: Isabel Luísa, Princess of Beira
Names
- English: Mary Frances Elizabeth; French: Marie-Françoise-Élisabeth; Portuguese: Maria Francisca Isabel
- House: Savoy
- Father: Charles Amadeus, Duke of Nemours
- Mother: Élisabeth de Bourbon

Dona Maria Francisca Isabel of Savoy (French: Marie Françoise Élisabeth; 21 June 1646 – 27 December 1683) was Queen of Portugal during her marriage to King Dom Afonso VI from 2 August 1666 to 24 March 1668 and, as the wife of Afonso's brother King Dom Peter II, from 12 September 1683 until her death in December that year. She married Afonso VI at the age of 20; because the marriage was never consummated, she was able to obtain an annulment. On 28 March 1668, she married the King's brother Infante Dom Peter, Duke of Beja, who was appointed prince regent the same year due to Afonso's perceived incompetence. She became queen a second time when Afonso died and Peter succeeded his brother, but she herself died three months later.

== Early life and family ==
Maria Francisca was born in Paris as the younger daughter of Charles Amadeus of Savoy, Duke of Nemours, and his wife, Élisabeth de Bourbon-Vendôme. (Note: Braga writes that Maria Francisca had a twin brother, born five hours after her, who died at eight months old.) Elisabeth was a granddaughter of Henry IV of France and his mistress Gabrielle d'Estrées.

Prior to marriage Maria Francisca was styled Mademoiselle d'Aumale, a title derived from the duchy of Aumale which was a property of her father. She and her only surviving sibling, Marie Jeanne of Savoy, were educated at Fontevrault. Their father died in 1652 and, though their uncle Henri II became the new Duke of Nemours, Maria Francisca and her sister inherited the revenues from the Nemours lands. After their mother died in 1664, they were handed over to their maternal grandfather César, Duke of Vendôme. The sisters remained close their entire lives.

== Consort of Afonso VI ==
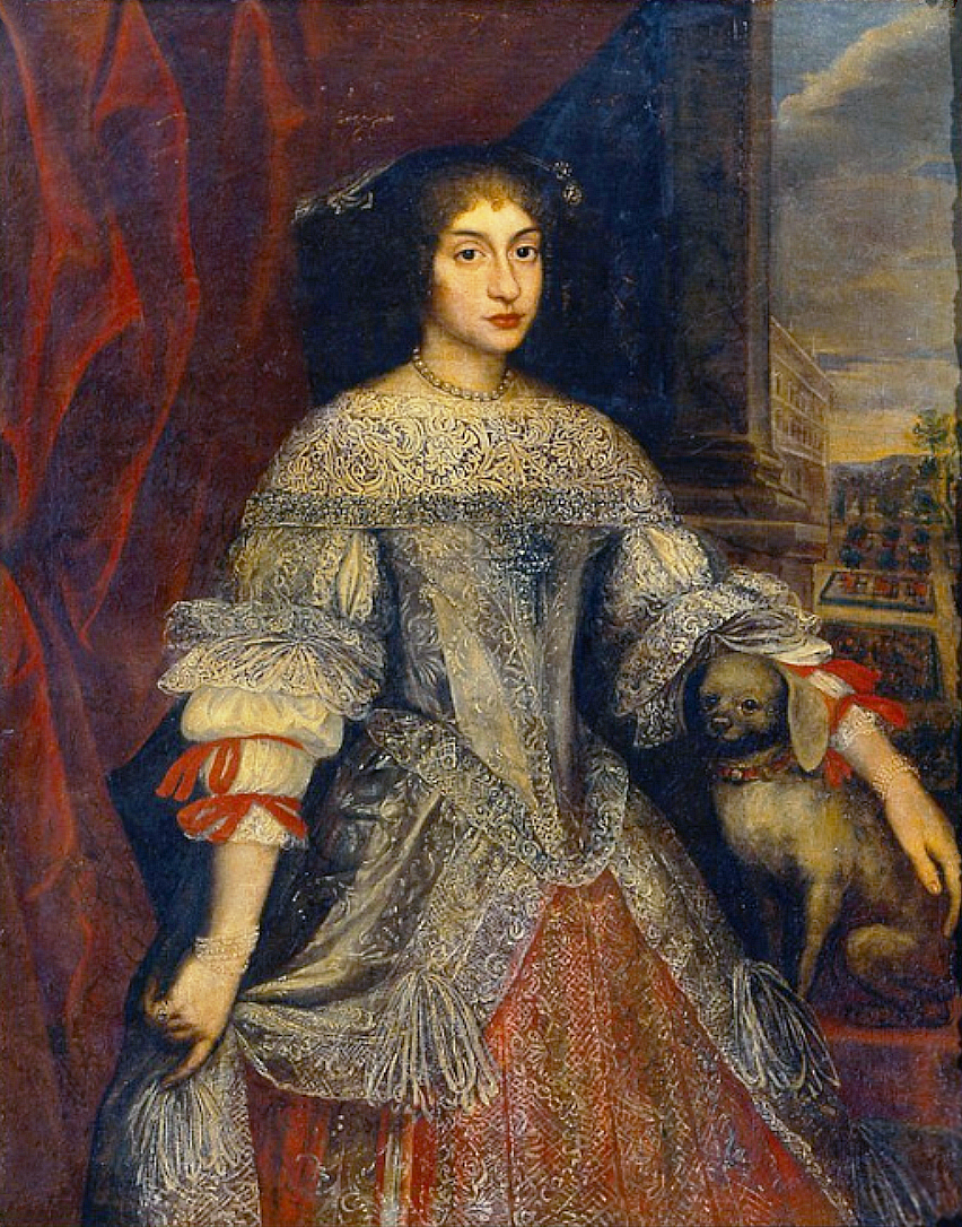
Presumed portrait of Maria Francisca while she was the wife of King Afonso VI

In 1656, Afonso VI succeeded his father, John IV, at the age of thirteen. Because the king was considered mentally unfit for governing, his mother served as regent even after he came of age. However, a palace coup d’état in 1662 transferred power to the king and his conspirators, namely Castelo Melhor.

Afonso appointed Castelo Melhor his secret notary (escrivão da puridade), a position in which the Count was able to exercise the functions of chief minister. Melhor was keen on arranging a marriage between Afonso and a French princess, as Portugal had long sought a dynastic marriage with France for support in the ongoing Portuguese Restoration War against Spain. Louis XIV welcomed the idea of a Portuguese marriage, aiming to increase France's influence in Portugal and weaken Spain by prolonging the Restoration War. The choice ultimately fell on Maria Francisca. Charles II of England, who greatly desired peace between Spain and Portugal, opposed the match but Louis XIV persuaded him to agree by providing him with the unpaid portion of Catherine's dowry. The marriage contract, featuring a generous dowry, was officially signed in Paris on 24 February 1666.

Maria Francisca was married by proxy to Afonso at La Rochelle on 27 June. She departed from France on 4 July and arrived in Portugal in early August. The wedding reception for the newlyweds took place in Belém, featuring a grand homage paid by the nobility. The festivities in Lisbon, marked by fireworks and ephemeral art, lasted from August to October.

Difficulties within the marriage surfaced quickly. Most sources suggest that Afonso, a hemiplegic, was impotent. Moreover, he was largely controlled by Castelo Melhor. Melhor wanted a French queen but did not want her to interfere in the government, a stance that clashed with the political ambitions of Maria Francisca. Tensions peaked when Melhor refused to grant the Queen a place on the council of state, a position previously held by Luisa Guzmán, the former queen consort of Portugal.

Afonso's brother Peter led a growing faction at court that opposed the excessive power Castelo Melhor wielded over Portuguese affairs. Discontented with her husband and frustrated with Castelo Melhor, Maria Francisca began to conspire with Peter and allegedly began a love affair with him. In September 1667, Peter orchestrated a palace coup d’état that dismissed Melhor and forced Afonso to relinquish his power. While Peter never formally usurped the throne, Afonso was king in name only for the rest of his life.

On 21 November 1667, the Queen retired to the Convent of Esperança and officially requested her marriage to Afonso be annulled on the grounds of non-consummation. The annulment was approved by Cardinal Vendôme, her maternal uncle, in March 1668.

== Consort of Pedro II ==
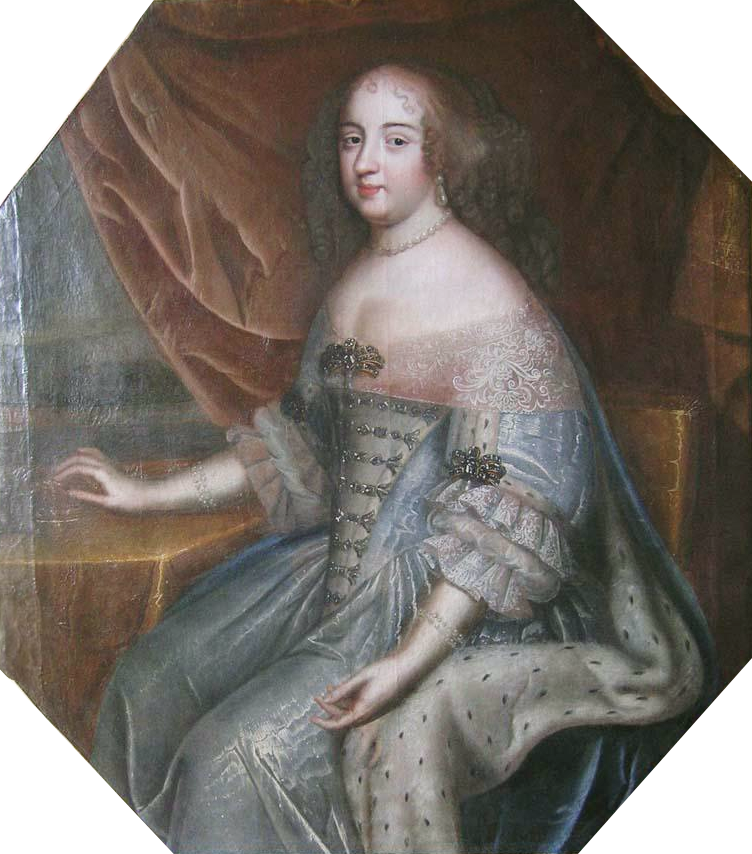
Probable portrait of Maria Francisca while she was the wife of King Pedro II.

In January 1668, Pedro's political ascendancy was officially acknowledged by the Cortes and he assumed the title of prince regent. On 27 March 1668, just days after her marriage to Afonso was officially annulled, Maria Francisca married Pedro. The union was encouraged by the Cortes because if Maria Francisca left Portugal it would be necessary to repay her dowry.

In January 1669, Maria Francisca, then princess regent, gave birth to a daughter, Isabel Luísa Josefa of Portugal, Princess of Beira. She suffered a miscarriage in December 1670 that prevented her from conceiving again. The Braganza dynasty was at the brink of extinction, and Pedro needed heirs, yet Maria Francisca was unable to produce further issue.

Louis XIV had supported the coup against Afonso VI with the expectation that it would increase French influence at court through Maria Francisca. However, Pedro disregarded French interests, opting not to uphold the terms of the Portugal-France alliance, and concluded the Portuguese Restoration War in 1668. Later, in 1671, Maria Francisca shocked a French ambassador by declaring that war exhausted Portugal would not serve as an ally to France in the developing Franco-Dutch War.

=== Illness and death ===
Throughout 1683, newspapers and diplomatic correspondence chronicled Maria Francisca's deteriorating health. In September, it was reported that she had become incredibly thin and ill. Her condition oscillated in the next months, offering sporadic signs of recovery. She died on 27 December 1683, three months after the death of Afonso VI.

Maria Francisca's only child, the Infanta Isabel Luísa, died unmarried at age 21. Pedro remarried to Maria Sofia of the Palatinate, who produced the much-needed heir, the future John V of Portugal.

Maria Francisca was initially interred at the Convent of the Francesinhas, but her remains were transferred to the Pantheon of the House of Braganza at the Monastery of São Vicente de Fora in 1912. Examination of her corpse revealed she had suffered from syphilis.

== Ancestry ==
Ancestors of Maria Francisca of Savoy

8. Jacques, Duke of Nemours
4. Henri I, Duke of Nemours
9. Anna d'Este
2. Charles Amadeus, Duke of Nemours
10. Charles, Duke of Aumale
5. Anne, Duchess of Aumale
11. Marie of Lorraine
1. Maria Francisca Isabel of Savoy
12. Henry IV of France
6. César, Duke of Vendôme
13. Gabrielle d'Estrées
3. Élisabeth de Bourbon
14. Philippe Emmanuel, Duke of Mercœur
7. Françoise of Lorraine
15. Marie, Duchess of Penthièvre

== Notes ==
Maria Francisca of Savoy House of Savoy Born: 21 June 1646 Died: 27 December 1683
Portuguese royalty
Vacant Title last held by Luisa de Guzmán	Queen consort of Portugal and the Algarves; 1666–1668; 1683	Vacant Title next held by Maria Sophia of Neuburg
