= Marie Jeanne Baptiste of Savoy-Nemours =

Duchess of Savoy from 1665 to 1675

Marie Jeanne Baptiste
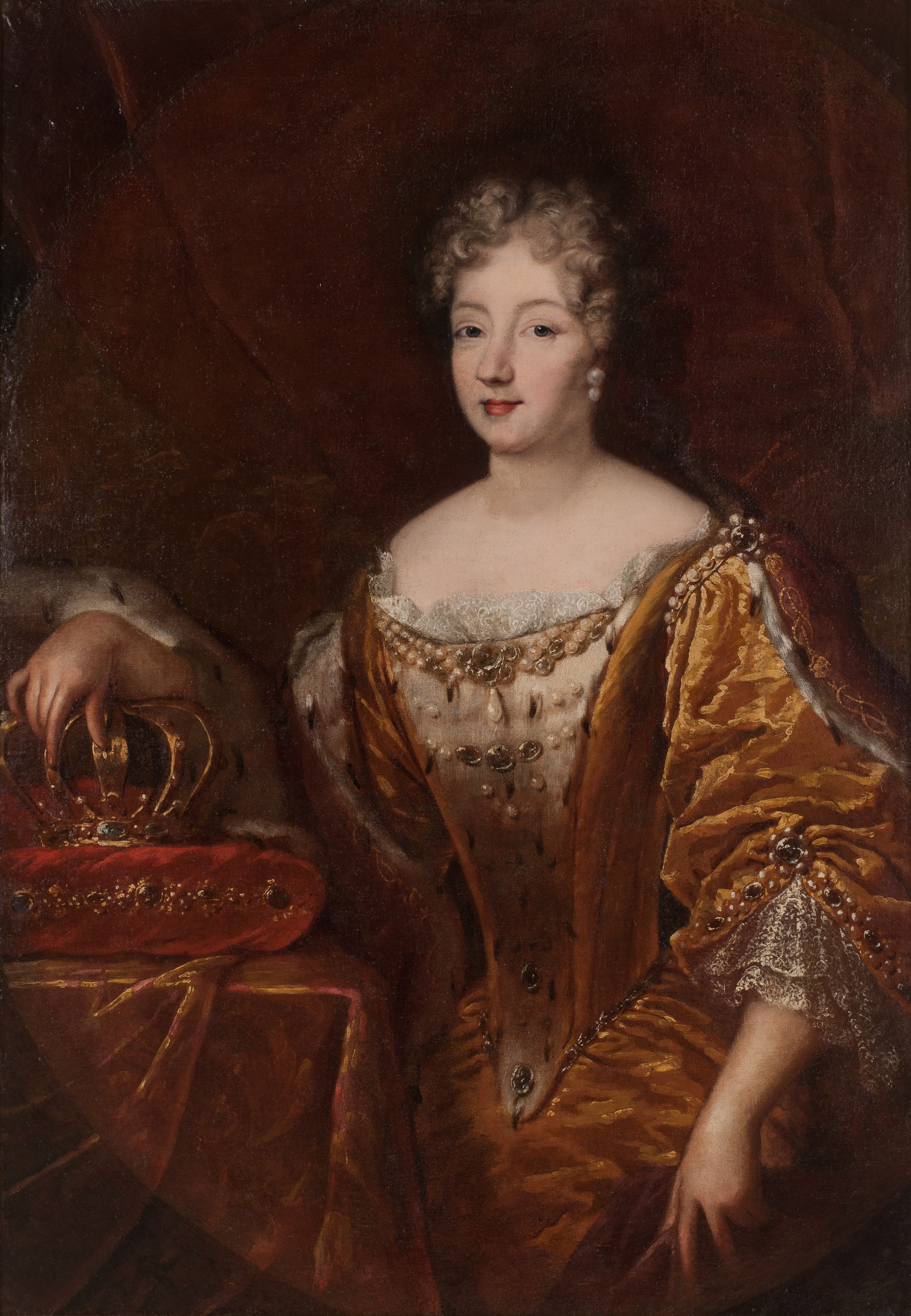
- Portrait c. 1680–85

Duchess consort of Savoy
- Tenure: 20 May 1665 – 12 June 1675

Regent of Savoy
- Regency: 12 June 1675 – 14 March 1684
- Born: 11 April 1644; Hôtel de Nemours, Paris, France
- Died: 15 March 1724 (aged 79); Palazzo Madama, Turin
- Burial: Sacra di San Michele, Sant'Ambrogio di Torino
- Spouse: Charles Emmanuel II, Duke of Savoy (m. 1665; died 1675)
- Issue: Victor Amadeus II of Sardinia
Names
- French: Marie-Jeanne-Baptiste; Italian: Maria Giovanna Battista; English: Mary Joan Baptista
- House: Savoy
- Father: Charles Amadeus, Duke of Nemours
- Mother: Élisabeth de Bourbon

Marie Jeanne Baptiste of Savoy-Nemours (French pronunciation: [maʁi ʒan batist], 11 April 1644 – 15 March 1724) was born a Princess of Savoy and became the Duchess of Savoy by marriage. First married by proxy to Charles of Lorraine in 1662, Lorraine soon refused to recognise the union and it was annulled. She married her kinsman Charles Emmanuel II, Duke of Savoy, in 1665. The mother of the future Victor Amadeus II of Sardinia who saw the elevation of the House of Savoy to kings, she styled herself as Madama Reale or Madame Royale. She acted as Regent of Savoy from 1675 in the name of her son Victor Amadeus II, who was her husband's successor. Her regency officially ended in 1680, but she maintained power until her son banished her from further influence in the state in 1684. She left a considerable architectural legacy in Turin, and was responsible for the remodelling of the Palazzo Madama, which was her private residence. At the time of her death, she was the mother of the King of Sardinia as well as great-grandmother of two other kings, Louis I of Spain and Louis XV of France.

== Family and childhood ==
Marie Jeanne Baptiste de Savoie was born at the Hôtel de Nemours in Paris, and was the eldest of five children born to Charles Amadeus, Duke of Nemours and his wife Princess Élisabeth de Bourbon-Vendôme. Through her mother, Marie Jeanne Baptiste was a great-granddaughter of Henry IV of France via her father César de Bourbon, Légitimé de France, whose mother was Gabrielle d'Estrées. This made her a half-first-cousin once removed of Louis XIV and a relation to most Catholic royalty at that time. She was a member of the Nemours cadet branch of the House of Savoy, which had settled in France in the sixteenth century. Marie Jeanne Baptiste grew up with her sister Marie Françoise, Mademoiselle d'Aumale who was born in 1646. She was styled as Mademoiselle de Nemours prior to marriage. As a young girl she frequented the salon of the famous Madame de La Fayette who later introduced Marie Jeanne Baptiste into correspondence with Madame de Sévigné. These relationships would give her insight to the French court during her years as regent.

Her father died in 1652, killed in a duel with his brother-in-law François, Duke of Beaufort. For the next several years she and her family were under the guardianship of her paternal uncle Henri II the new Duke of Nemours, though Marie Jeanne Baptiste had inherited many of her father's income sources. At Henri's death in 1659 the duchy of Nemours reverted to the crown but Marie Jeanne Baptiste continued to receive the income. With two young daughters, her mother Élisabeth looked to her maternal family for support in getting them properly settled. Élisabeth's mother was a princess of Lorraine.

== Marriage negotiations ==
Marie Jeanne Baptiste's monogram

Her family wanted a match with Charles Emmanuel II, Duke of Savoy, who was the son of Christine Marie of France (half-aunt of Élisabeth). Christine Marie summoned Marie Jeanne Baptiste, her mother, and sister to Turin in 1659 for inspection. Charles Emmanuel showed a keen interest in Marie Jeanne as a potential wife. However, his mother had been warned by Cardinal Mazarin of Marie Jeanne Baptiste's ambitious nature, causing her to reject the marriage. Christine Marie arranged a marriage between her son and Françoise Madeleine d'Orléans, who proved suitably docile for the controlling mother. This wedding took place in 1663.

Having returned to France, Mademoiselle de Nemours caught the attention of the dashing Prince Charles of Lorraine, heir of the Duke of Lorraine. The court of Portugal had previously requested her hand in marriage, however she refused after some deliberation on the subject. Charles' rank was similar to that of the Duke of Savoy and the match was pursued by Marie Jeanne Baptiste's mother. She became engaged to Charles on 4 February 1662. The match was a popular one with the French court, and the union was supported by Queen Anne (mother of Louis XIV). However, when the Treaty of Montmartre was signed two days later, the duchies of Lorraine and Bar were surrendered to Louis XIV. This left the duke of Lorraine landless, and drove him to join the imperial court. As a result, Charles backed out of the engagement. The marriage between Marie Jeanne Baptiste and Charles had not been consummated and was annulled.

In Turin, Christine Marie died on 27 Dec 1663, and her daughter-in-law Françoise Madeleine died 14 Jan 1664. This left Charles Emmanuel II unmarried and without an heir. Proposals came from Françoise Madeleine's sisters but were rejected. It became clear that Charles Emmanuel II wanted to unite with Marie Jeanne Baptiste, who was a member of his own house. This union was supported by Louis XIV. He did not want Charles Emmanuel II to marry an Archduchess of Austria, for fear of loss of influence in the duchy. Negotiations took over a year before Marie Jeanne Baptiste went to Annecy with her grandmother Françoise of Lorraine on 1 May 1665 to meet her future husband. Marie Jeanne Baptiste married Charles Emmanuel II on 20 May 1665 at the Castello del Valentino amid great celebration. Her large dowry included border provinces of Genevois, Faucigny as well as Beaufort which would become the property of the mainline House of Savoy.

== Duchess of Savoy ==
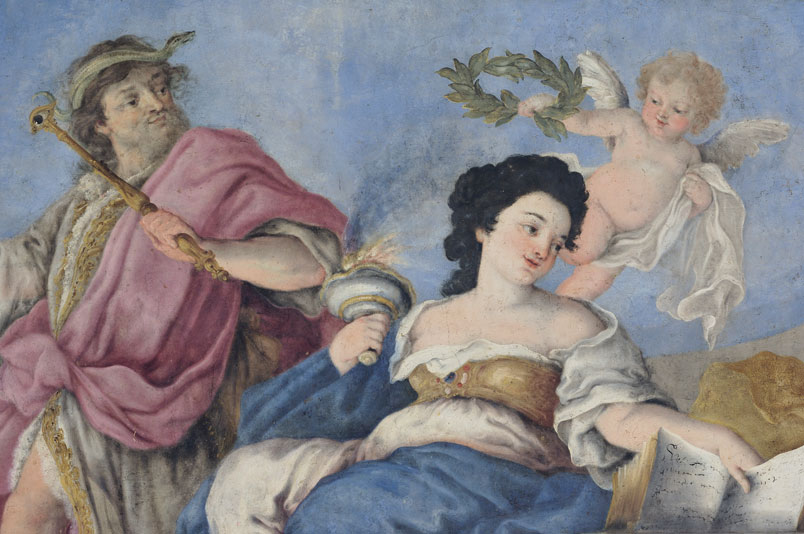
Triumph of virtue of Madama Reale by Domenico Guidobono in the Palazzo Madama

Arms as Duchess of Savoy

In Savoy her name was Italianised to Maria Giovanna Battista di Savoia and she was known as Madama Reale. This name was a reference to the style Madame Royale from her native France, and had been used by the late Christine Marie. Marie Jeanne Baptiste was praised as being an attractive and intelligent woman. Almost a year after the marriage the 21-year-old duchess gave birth to a son on 14 May 1666 who was named Victor Amadeus in honour of Victor Amadeus I, Duke of Savoy the child's grandfather and husband of Christine Marie. In the same year, her sister Marie Françoise married Afonso VI of Portugal. The two sisters remained close all their lives. Prior to her husband's death, Marie Jeanne Baptiste played little part in the politics of the time. In his reign, her husband carried out various improvements to the royal residences and left a great architectural legacy in Savoy. The couple also ordered the construction of various churches in Turin.

Her husband also had various mistresses and illegitimate children, who Marie Jeanne Baptiste was obliged to ignore. In 1672 Hortense Mancini, on the run from her husband, sought and received the protection of Charles Emmanuel II. Much to Marie Jeanne Baptiste's annoyance, she became a regular mistress and was given the Château de Chambéry. Marie Jeanne Baptiste was unable to remove her from there until Charles Emmanuel died. On 12 June 1675 Charles Emmanuel suddenly died in Turin at the age of forty after a series of convulsive fevers. On his death bed he pronounced his wife as Regent of Savoy over his son and heir.

== Regent of Savoy ==
Declared Regent of her eleven-year-old son's dominions, she took her new charge with great interest and ambition. She carried on her husband's work on the properties of Savoy, supporting construction projects, artistic organizations, and educational institutions. She supported the work of Alessandro Stradella, protecting him when he fled to Turin from Venice. She continued to fund and support the work of Guarino Guarini, who completed the chapel for the Shroud of Turin and a Jesuit college under her rule. She also worked to expand the city of Turin down to the Po river. She attempted to start a university in Chambéry, but was not successful.

She did much to maintain links with her powerful neighbour France, which was both ally and family. She was criticised for wanting to maintain power too much, and for being a puppet of Louis XIV. However, she also worked to maintain and develop relationships with the royal courts of Spain, England, and the Empire. The people of Mondovì resisted her authority for many years, and it was only under her son that they finally relented.

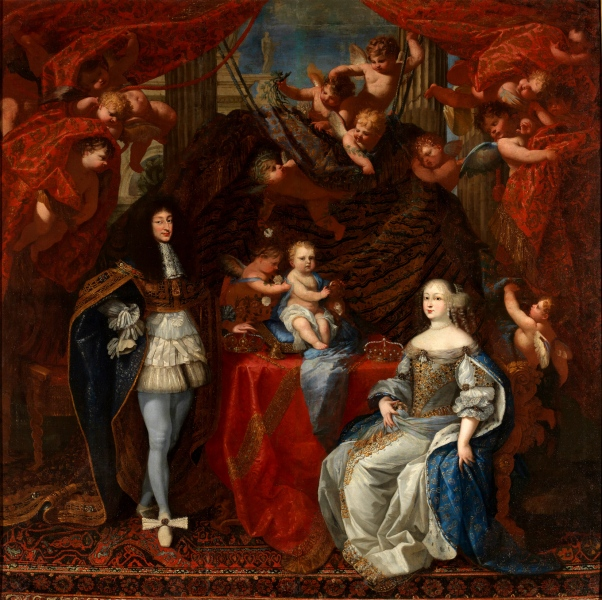
Marie Jeanne Baptiste with her husband and son in 1666 by an unknown artist

Her relationship with her only son was always strained. This tension has been blamed on her ambition to keep power to herself. Marie Jeanne Baptiste spent most of her time working on state business, which she enjoyed, and had little time for her only child. She kept him under close scrutiny in order to make sure he would not try to assume power from her. Despite the bad relationship with her son, she openly kept lovers at court. At the age of thirty three, she was in a relationship with the Count of Saint Maurice, some ten years her junior. Marie Jeanne Baptiste and Saint Maurice's relationship lasted some four years before his whole family left in disgrace due to his father failing on a string of diplomatic relations.

By 1677 Marie Jeanne Baptiste was looking to organise a marriage for her son who would reach his majority in May 1680. Popular candidates were the Archduchess Maria Antonia, a cousin in Portugal, Maria Sofia of the Palatinate-Neuburg, or the French born Anne Marie d'Orléans. Marie Jeanne Baptiste first looked to her sister in Lisbon whose only daughter the Infanta Isabel Luísa was the heiress to her father's dominions. Portuguese law stated that an heiress to the throne must remain in the country and marry a kinsman. Marie Jeanne Baptiste opened negotiations with Portugal in order to get the Infanta to marry her son. This prestigious union would have left Marie Jeanne Baptiste permanently in control of Savoy, with Victor Amadeus II living in Portugal. Plans were made for Victor Amadeus' arrival in Lisbon, and a political party was established opposing the union. Openly disliking the union and approaching his majority, Victor Amadeus II decided to postpone the marriage for two years.

Marie Jeanne Baptiste then looked to the Grand Duchy of Tuscany which offered Anna Maria Luisa de' Medici as a bride. Negotiations were kept secret from France. This match was popular as it would give a powerful ally in Italy and was even favoured by Victor Amadeus II. The secret correspondence between Savoy and Tuscany has since been lost and the match never materialised.

Even though Marie Jeanne Baptiste's regency officially ended in 1680 she did not hand over power until 1684 when forced to do so by her son. Louis XIV was eager to maintain his already considerable influence in Savoy and thus offered his niece Anne Marie d'Orléans. Anne Marie was the daughter of Philippe of France, Duke of Orléans and his first wife Henrietta of England. Victor Amadeus agreed to the match and he married Anne Marie in person on 6 May 1684.

== Retirement and later life ==
Victor Amadeus took full control of the Duchy at the start of 1684. He decided to banish his mother from all direct influence at court. She retired to the Palazzo Madama in the city of Turin opposite the Ducal Palace of Turin where the court resided most of the year. This building had been the home of Christine Marie in her dowager years and under Marie Jeanne Baptiste was extended under the direction of Filippo Juvarra who was a favourite of her son.

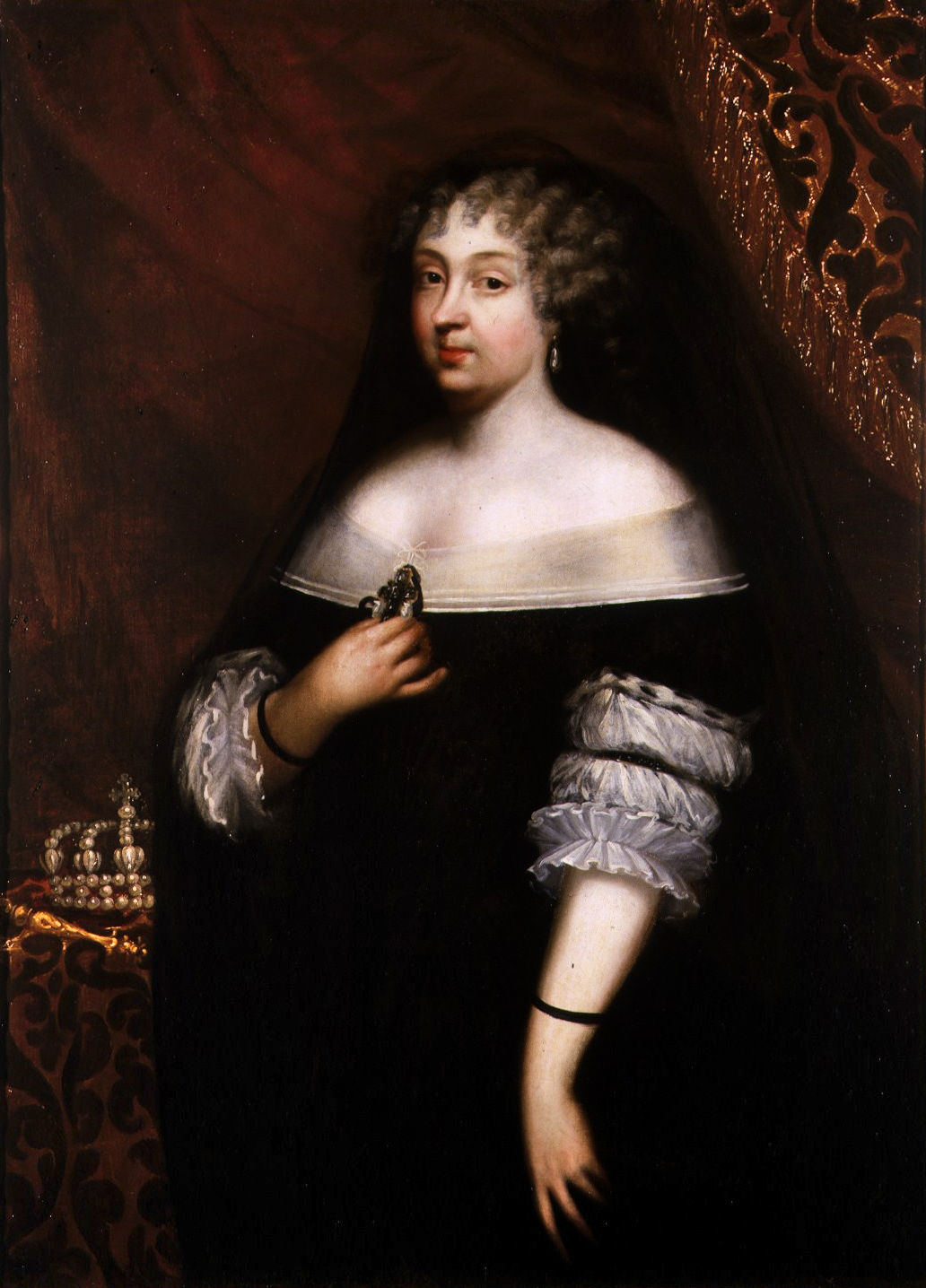
Marie Jeanne Baptiste in widows clothing by Laurent Dufour, held at the Palazzo Madama, Turin.

In 1686 she sold the Duchy of Aumale to Louis Auguste de Bourbon, an illegitimate son of Louis XIV and Madame de Montespan. Aumale had been her personal property since 1659 at her father's death. Marie Jeanne Baptiste was also the last Countess of Geneva. The county was united with Savoy after her death.

Her son's marriage would produce some eight children four of whom would have further issue. Marie Jeanne Baptiste acted as godmother to her eldest grandchild Princess Princess Maria Adelaide. She also maintained a good friendship with her daughter-in-law Anne Marie. Maria Adelaide and her sister Maria Luisa would have a close relationship with their grandmother, and both would make weekly visits to the Palazzo Madama. Her relationship with Maria Adelaide in particular is documented in letters the two sent to each other after 1696 when the young princess married Louis of France. Maria Luisa married Louis' brother Philip V of Spain by proxy on 11 Sep 1701. Sadly Maria Adelaide would die in 1712 at Versailles of Measles. These two prestigious marriages were designed by Louis XIV to entice Savoyard support during the War of the Spanish Succession. During this war, Marie Jeanne Baptiste was obliged to sell her jewels in order to maintain her household during the Battle of Turin of 1706. She and her grandchildren were obliged to flee to the safety of Genoa during the conflict.

Thanks to the Treaty of Utrecht in 1713 her son was given the Kingdom of Sicily in recognition for his services to Charles VI, Holy Roman Emperor in the War of the Spanish Succession. Her son was crowned king of Sicily in Palermo Cathedral in December 1713. Victor Amadeus II asked his mother to maintain the government while he was gone, but she declined and her grandson Victor Amadeus, Prince of Piedmont was made regent instead.

Months after, the Savoyard court the family found out the death of Maria Luisa who had died in February 1714 which was followed a year later by the Prince of Piedmont who died of smallpox. Three deaths in four years caused mother and son to become closer. With the death of the Prince of Piedmont her youngest grandson Charles Emmanuel, Duke of Aosta became heir apparent to his father's domains.

Marie Jeanne Baptiste died at the Palazzo Madama in March 1724 at age 79.

== Issue ==
1. Vittorio Amedeo II (14 May 1666 – 31 October 1732) married Anne Marie d'Orléans and had issue. Had illegitimate issue with Jeanne Baptiste d'Albert de Luynes. Married morganatically to Anna Canalis di Cumania.

== Ancestry ==
Ancestors of Marie Jeanne Baptiste of Savoy-Nemours

8. Jacques, Duke of Nemours
4. Henri I, Duke of Nemours
9. Anna d'Este
2. Charles Amadeus, Duke of Nemours
10. Charles, Duke of Aumale
5. Anne, Duchess of Aumale
11. Marie of Lorraine
1. Marie Jeanne Baptiste of Savoy
12. Henry IV of France
6. César, Duke of Vendôme
13. Gabrielle d'Estrées
3. Élisabeth de Bourbon
14. Philippe Emmanuel, Duke of Mercœur
7. Françoise of Lorraine
15. Marie, Duchess of Penthièvre

== Sources ==
- Fraser, Antonia (2006). Love and Louis XIV; The Women in the Life of the Sun King. London: Anchor Books. ISBN 0-7538-2293-8.
- Frézet, Jean (1827). Histoire de la Maison de Savoie. Vol. 2. Alliana et Paravia.
- Hahn, Emily (1971). Love conquers nothing: a glandular history of civilization. Ayer Publishing. ISBN 978-0-8369-8062-2.
- Kamen, Henry (2001). Philip V of Spain: The King who Reigned Twice. Yale University Press. ISBN 0-300-08718-7.
- Oresko, Robert (2004). "Maria Giovanna Battista of Savoy-Nemours (1644–1724): daughter, consort, and Regent of Savoy". In Campbell Orr, Clarissa (ed.). Queenship in Europe 1660-1815: The Role of the Consort. Cambridge University Press. pp. 16–55. ISBN 0-521-81422-7.
- Pitts, Vincent Joseph (2000). La Grande Mademoiselle at the Court of France. The Johns Hopkins University Press. ISBN 0-8018-6466-6.
- Ragnhild, Marie Hatton (1997). Royal and republican sovereignty in early modern Europe. Cambridge University Press. ISBN 0-521-41910-7.
- Storrs, Christopher (1999). War, diplomacy and the rise of Savoy, 1690-1720. Cambridge University Press. ISBN 0-521-55146-3.
- Symcox, Geoffrey (1983). Victor Amadeus II: absolutism in the Savoyard State, 1675-1730. University of California Press. ISBN 978-0-520-04974-1.
- Tome, Quatri (2009). Les Anciennes Maisons de Paris Sous Napoléon III. Paris: BiblioBazaar LLC. ISBN 978-1-115-27908-6.
- Vitelleschi, Marchese (1905). The romance of Savoy, Victor Amadeus II and his Stuart bride. Vol. I. New York: Harvard College Library.
- Williams, H. Noel (1909). A Rose of Savoy, Marie Adelaide of Savoy, duchesse de Bourgogne, Mother of Louis XV. New York: Charles Scribner's Sons.

Marie Jeanne Baptiste of Savoy-Nemours House of Savoy Born: 11 April 1644 Died: 15 March 1724
Italian royalty
Vacant Title last held by Françoise Madeleine d'Orléans	Duchess consort of Savoy; 20 May 1665 – 12 June 1675	Vacant Title next held by Anne Marie d'Orléans
