= Domenico Guidobono =

Italian painter

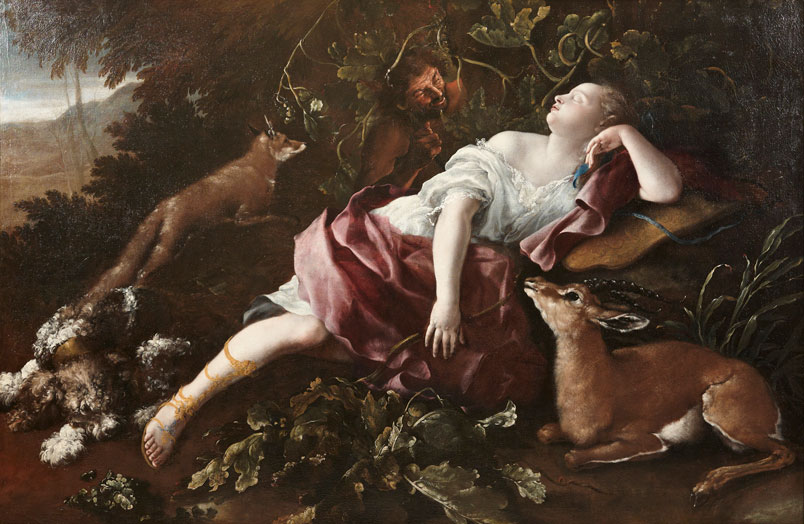
Sleeping Diana

Domenico Guidobono (1668–1746) was an Italian painter of easel paintings and frescoes, who together with his brother Bartolomeo Guidobono was one of the principal decorative painters active in Liguria and Piedmont in the late 17th and first half of the 18th century.

== Life ==
Domenico Guidobono was born in Savona, Republic of Genoa as the son of Giovanni Antonio Guidobono and Geronima Cross. His father was a decorative painter of maiolica (ceramic earthenware), who worked for the royal court of Savoy. When he was baptized in the church of St. John the Baptist in Savona, his godfather was the Genovese painter Domenico Piola, one of the eminent members of the Piola family, which operated a large workshop known as the 'Casa Piola'. It is likely therefore that in addition to being trained by his father Domenico Guidobono also benefited from training in the Casa Piola.

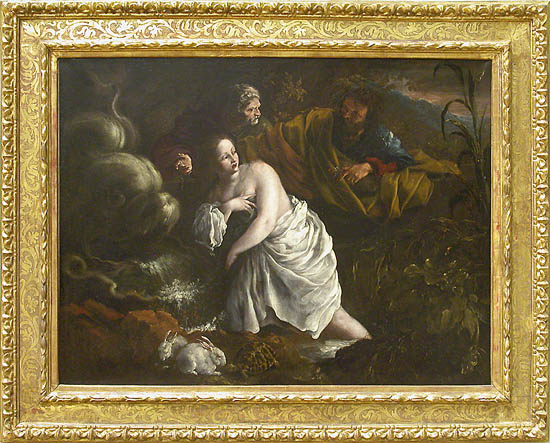
Susanna and the Elders

His older brother Bartolomeo (1654–1709) gained a major reputation as a decorative fresco painter. The career and life of Domenico have remained in the shadow of his more famous brother and therefore less is known about the younger brother’s training and career when compared to that of his elder brother. As from a young age Domenico travelled and worked with his brother on commissions, it has not always been possible to distinguish the work of either artist. There has been a tendency to attribute lesser quality works to the younger brother which has affected the reputation of the younger artist.

Despite a lack of documentary sources that can shed light on the early career of Domenico, it is assumed that the young artist travelled with his elder brother in the early 1680s to Turin where they worked during the years 1684–85 on frescoes for the Monastery of Casanova at Carmagnola, a small town near Turin. This was likely the first independent commission undertaken by the Guidobono brothers.

During this period Domenico also executed some canvases with biblical subjects, which are not documented, but have been attributed to him on stylistic grounds such as the Susanna and the Elders now in the Louvre. In subsequent years the brothers split their time between the Monastery in Casanova and Turin.

In 1705 the two brothers had definitely returned to Turin. Domenico was then already married to Maria Caterina and the couple had three children Maria Jacinta, Beatrice, and Vittorio as is known from census documents prepared in Turin in that year.

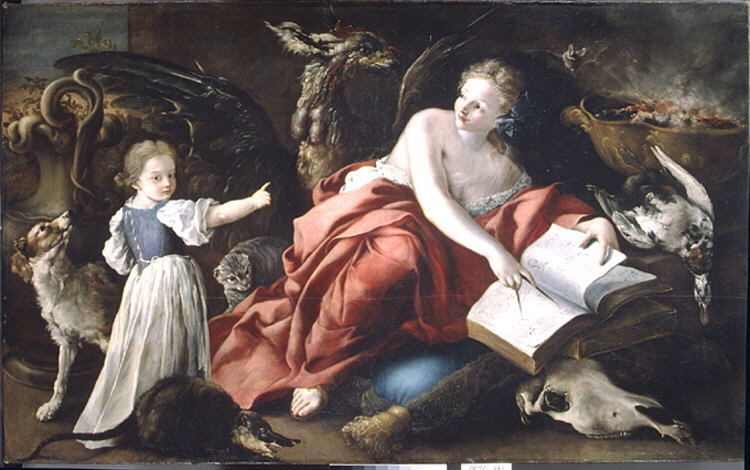
An Allegory

From the early years of the new century Domenico commenced a period of intense independent activity in Turin, certainly after his brother's death in 1709. In 1709 he worked on the frescoes in the presbytery of Turin Cathedral.

He garnered greater professional recognition, which earned him commissions over a period of about twenty years in the Palazzo Madama, Turin. The commissions were given by the Duchess of Savoy Marie Jeanne Baptiste of Savoy-Nemours, known as Madame Reale. Some documents attest to the professional relationship of the painter with the court of Savoy since 1710. Along many other artists, Domenico participated in the renovation of the building which the duchess wanted to turn into a sumptuous royal palace. The artist became the undisputed protagonist of the decorations of the halls on the first floor of Palazzo Madama, known as the Guidobono halls – the Madama Reale's Chamber, the Chinese Cabinet, and the Southern Veranda. Domenico Guidobono was active in Turin and the rest of the Duchy until the ascent of the architect Filippo Juvara, who as a principal designer of the Palazzo Madama marginalized him.

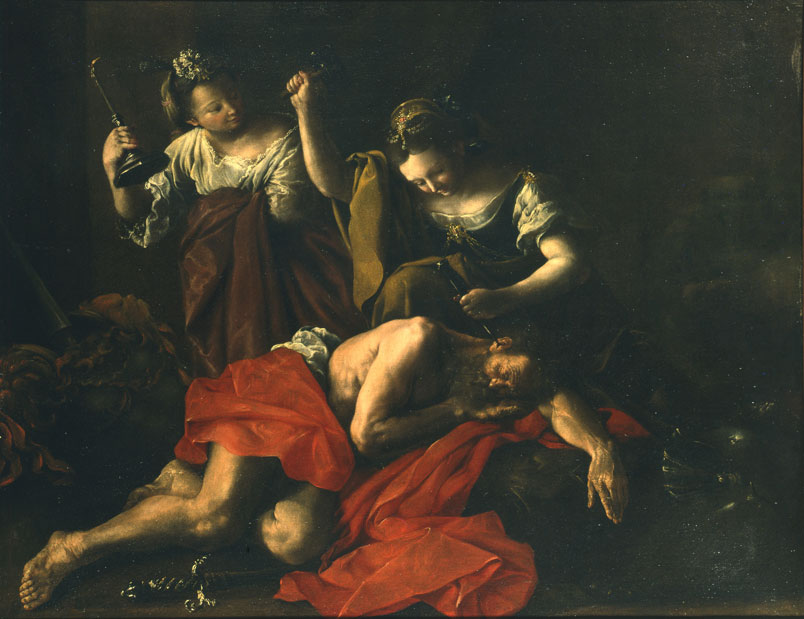
Jael and Sisera

Despite fulfilling this major commission in the Palazzo Madama, Domenico worked probably also in other Turin mansions. After the death of the duchess in 1724 Domenico moved to Genoa, where he got commissions of some importance such as the frescoes in Palazzo Ottavio Imperiale on Campetto square and in the palazzo Negrone on Piazza Fontane Marose.

Little or nothing is known about the final years of the artist's life and activity. In 1737 the fathers of the monastery of Our Lady of the Assumption in Genoa, received from Domenico a painting depicting the Adoration of the Shepherds, in exchange for a painting of the same subject by his brother Bartolomeo.

According to the oldest sources, Domenico died in 1746 in Naples, where, already elderly, he had moved for some time to work.

== Work ==
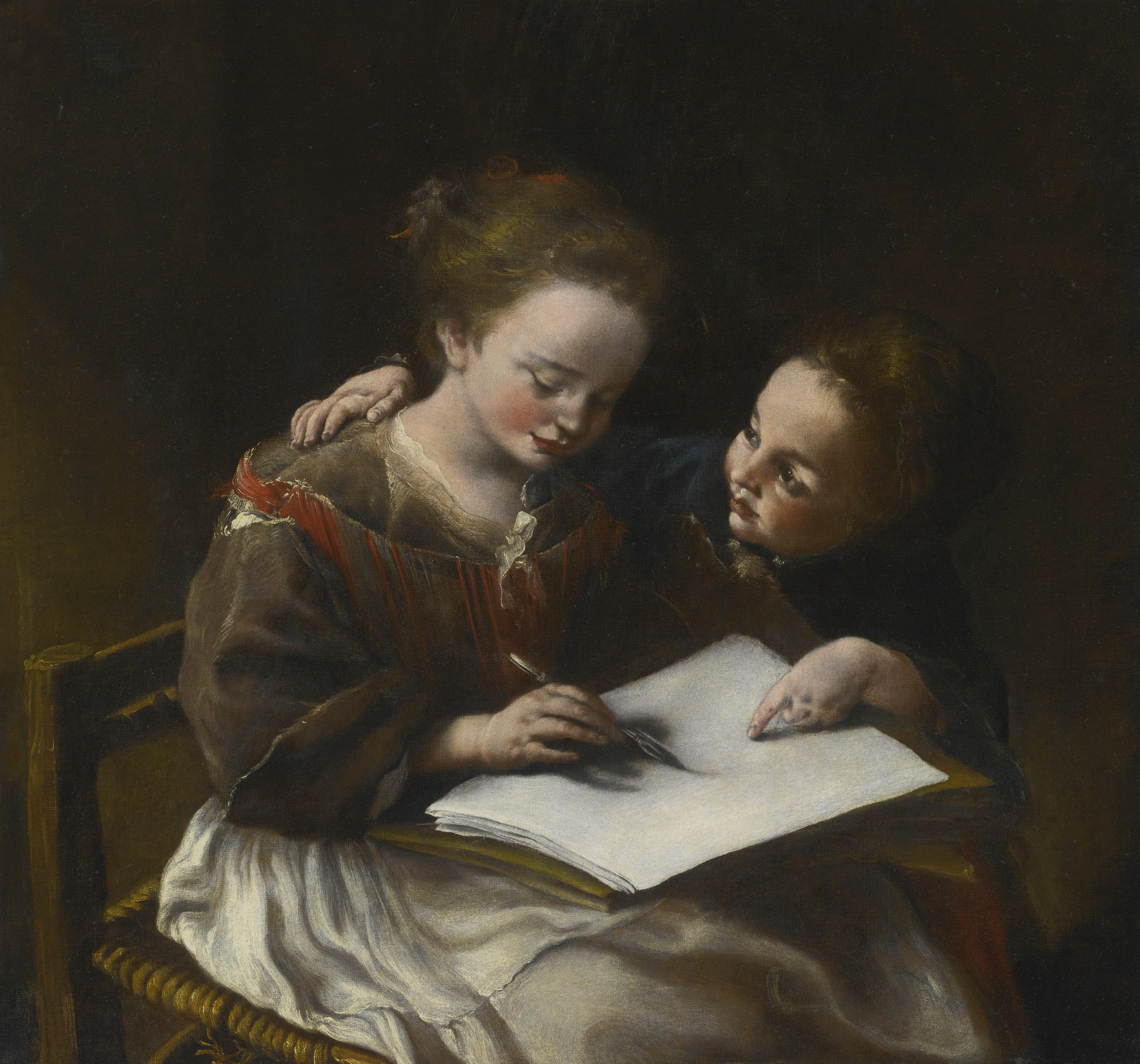
The drawing lesson

The subjects of the Guidobono brothers' works ranged from mythology to Biblical stories, sacred subjects, still lifes, allegories and magic scenes. Their work displays a meticulous approach to depicting the details of flowers, fruits, birds, animals, objects. The still lifes are painted with a refined, light touch and ooze seductive mystery.

The brothers played an important role in introducing to Turin the light and festive decorative style typical of Genoese residences. This style emphasized light effects and elements drawn from nature. The work of the two brothers is directly related and often difficult to distinguish.

Domenico's personal style began to show itself more forcefully after his brother's death in 1709. An example is the Allegory in the Metropolitan Museum of Art. The subject of this painting remains elusive. The woman holding dividers over an open book with diagrams has been identified as Circe or Melissa. However, she probably depicts a more generic sorceress. She is surrounded by symbols of her dark magic: skulls, a bat, and a chimera (a fantastical winged creature). The animal in the left foreground is a coati, a member of the raccoon family native to South America.

== Other projects ==
Media related to Domenico Guidobono at Wikimedia Commons
