= Palazzo Madama, Turin =

Palace in Turin, Italy

Palazzo Madama
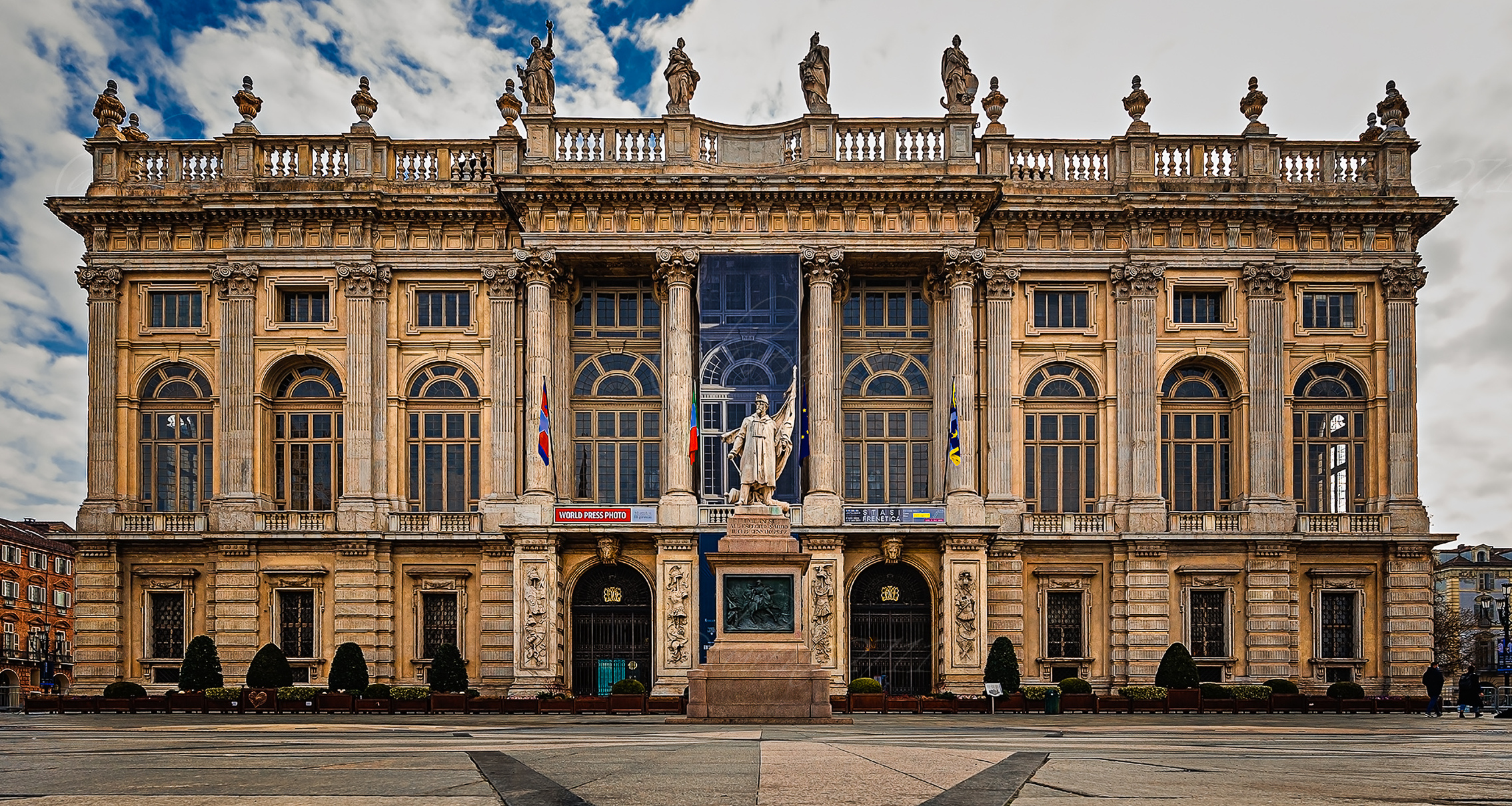
- Juvarra's façade of the castle

- Location within Turin
- Interactive fullscreen map

General information
- Coordinates: 45°04′15″N 7°41′09″E

UNESCO World Heritage Site
- Criteria: (i)(ii)(iv)(v)
- Inscription: 1997 (21st Session)

Palazzo Madama is a palace in Turin, Piedmont. It was the first Senate of the Kingdom of Italy, and takes its traditional name from the embellishments it received under two queens (madama) of the House of Savoy.

In 1997, it was placed on the UNESCO World Heritage Site list along with 13 other residences of the House of Savoy.

== History ==
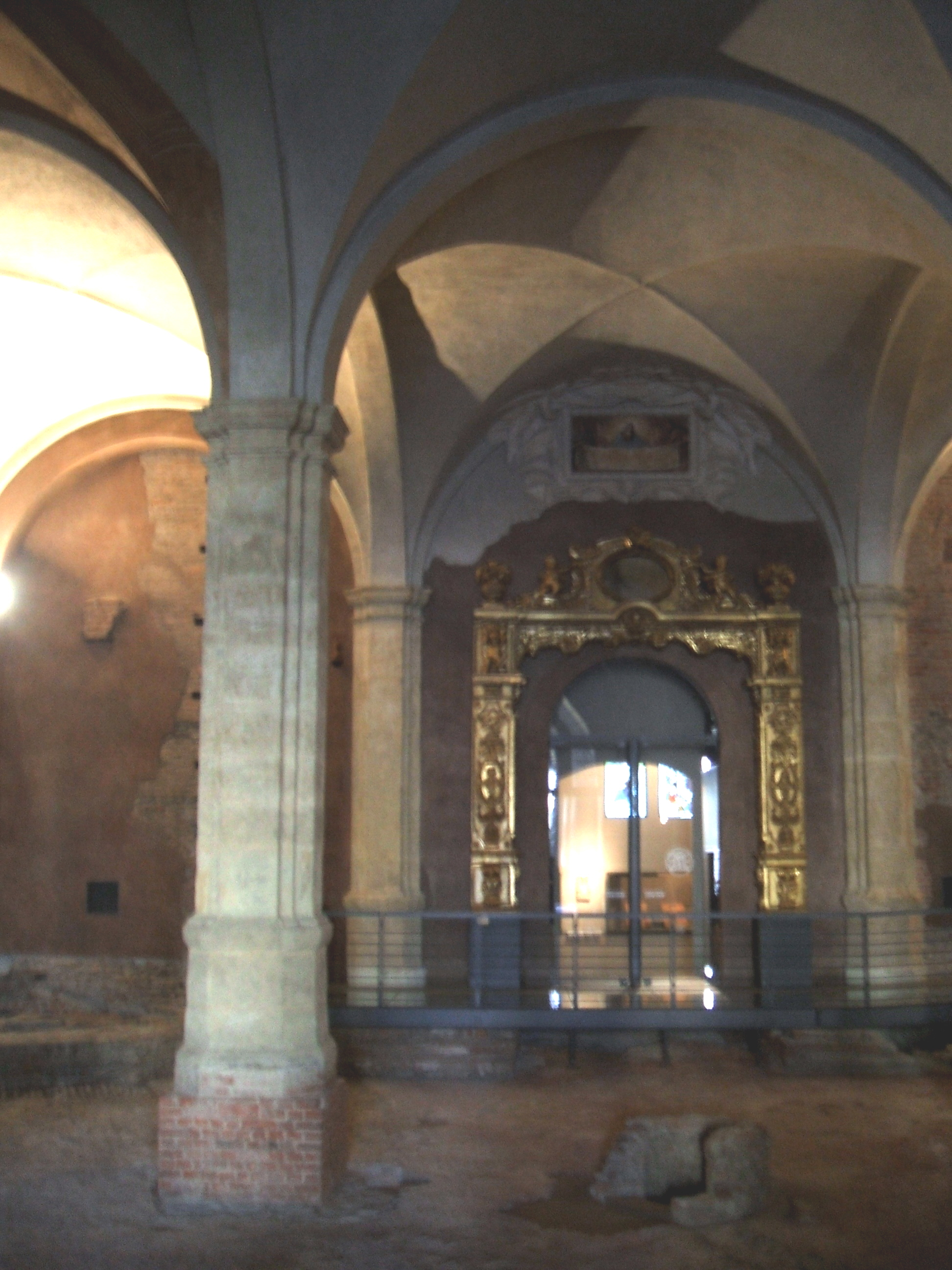
Stone piers atop brick footings stand out of the excavated Roman stratum.

At the beginning of the first century BC, the site of the palace was occupied by a gate in the Roman walls from which the decumanus maximus of Augusta Taurinorum (the ancient name of Turin) departed. Two of the towers, although restored, still testify to this original nucleus. After the fall of the Western Roman Empire, the gate was used as a fortified stronghold in the defences of the city.

Later the building became a possession of the Savoia-Acaja, a secondary branch of the House of Savoy; in the early 14th century, they enlarged it into a castle. A century later Ludovico of Acaja rebuilt it in square shape, with an inner court and a portico, and four cylindrical towers at each corner. The form of this edifice is still clearly recognisable from the back section of the palace. After the extinction of the Acajas, the edifice became a residence for guests of the House of Savoy.

In 1637 the regent for Duke Charles Emmanuel II, Christine of France (aunt of Louis XIV), chose it as her personal residence. She commissioned the covering of the court and a revamping of the inner apartments. Sixty years later another regent, Marie Jeanne of Savoy, who was known as Madama Reale, lived in the palace. She conferred upon it definitively the nickname of Madama (Italian for Madame). She invited many artists to renovate the building which the duchess wanted to turn into a sumptuous royal palace. The artist Domenico Guidobono became the undisputed protagonist of the decorations of the halls on the first floor of Palazzo Madama, known as the Guidobono halls – the Madama Reale’s Chamber, the Chinese Cabinet, and the Southern Veranda. The duchess also asked architect Filippo Juvarra to design a new Baroque palace in white stone, which he did in 1716, but the works halted in 1721 after only the front section had been completed.

Later the palace had various uses, and housed the headquarters of the provisional French government during the Napoleonic Wars. In the 19th century King Charles Albert selected it as seat of the Pinacoteca Regia, the royal art gallery called after 1933 Galleria Sabauda, and, later, of the Subalpine Senate (the Parliament of the Kingdom of Sardinia) and of the High Court. Since 1934 it has housed the City Museum of Ancient Art.

Overlooking Piazza Castello, the section built by Juvarra (illustration, right) constitutes today a scenographic façade a single bay deep, screening the rear part of the edifice, which has remained unchanged (illustration, above right). On the exterior, Juvarra expressed what was intended as a magnificent architectural preamble to an edifice that was never built, as a high-ceilinged piano nobile with arch-headed windows, which is linked to a mezzanine above it by a colossal row of pilasters of the composite order. Each pilaster stands on a sturdy and formal fielded channel-rusticated base against the ashlar masonry of the ground floor. The central three bays are emphasised by the bolder relief offered by full columns attached to the façade, which is returned inward behind them to afford a vast glass-fronted central interior space like a glazed loggia. Their prominence is emphasised by the tall socles on which they stand, carved with trophies of arms in relief. In the flanking triple bays, each central bay is broken slightly forwards, given its window a deeper, more shadowed reveal within the depth of the wall; its two outer giant pilasters overlap the main order as if that continued behind them. On either side the bays' windows are set together within a slightly recessed panel, thus there are three layered planes to the façade. The dentiled cornice supported on bold consoles in the frieze breaks forward over the central columns and subtly over the central bays of the flanking sections as well. A conforming balustrade decorated with vases and statues in white marble surmounts the façade.

On 25 January 2022, the semi-final allocation draw and host city handover for the Eurovision Song Contest 2022 was set and took place at the palace.

== Museum of Ancient Art ==
The Palazzo Madama houses the Turin City Museum of Ancient Art. Despite its name, it is a large collection of paintings, statues, church ornaments, porcelain, and decorative art, mostly from the late Middle Ages to the 18th century.

Turin's museum of ancient art, called Museo dell'Antichità, is located on the grounds of the Palazzo Reale.

== Gallery ==
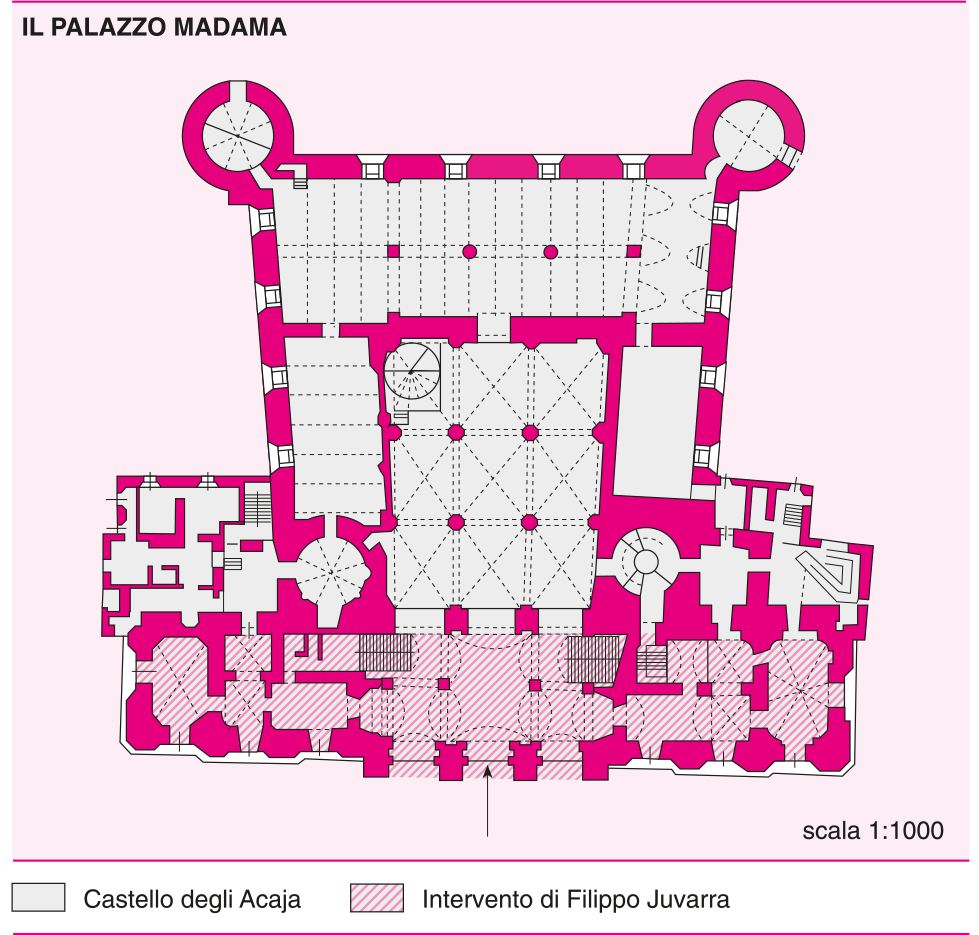
Plan

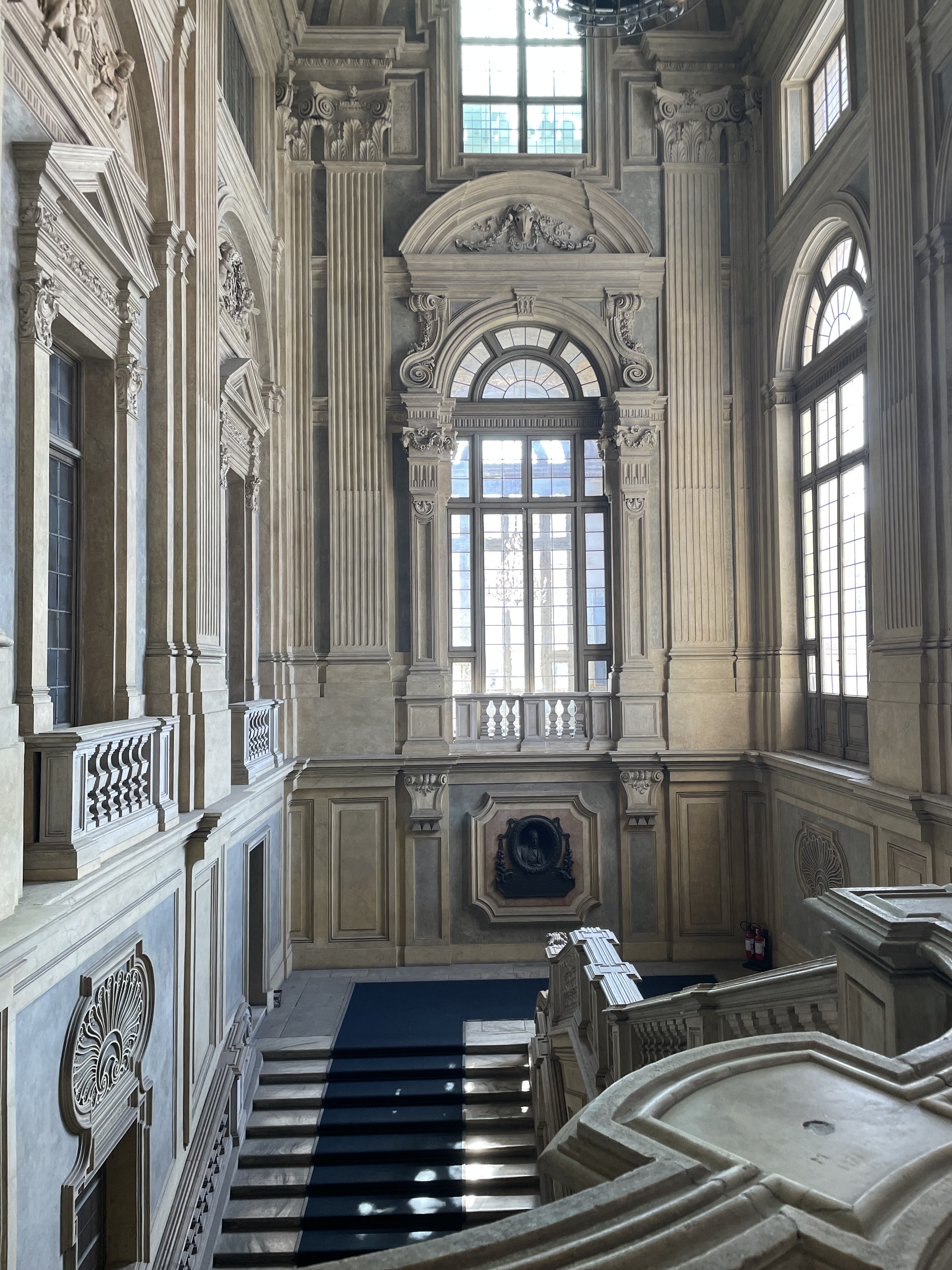
Scalinata Palazzo Madama

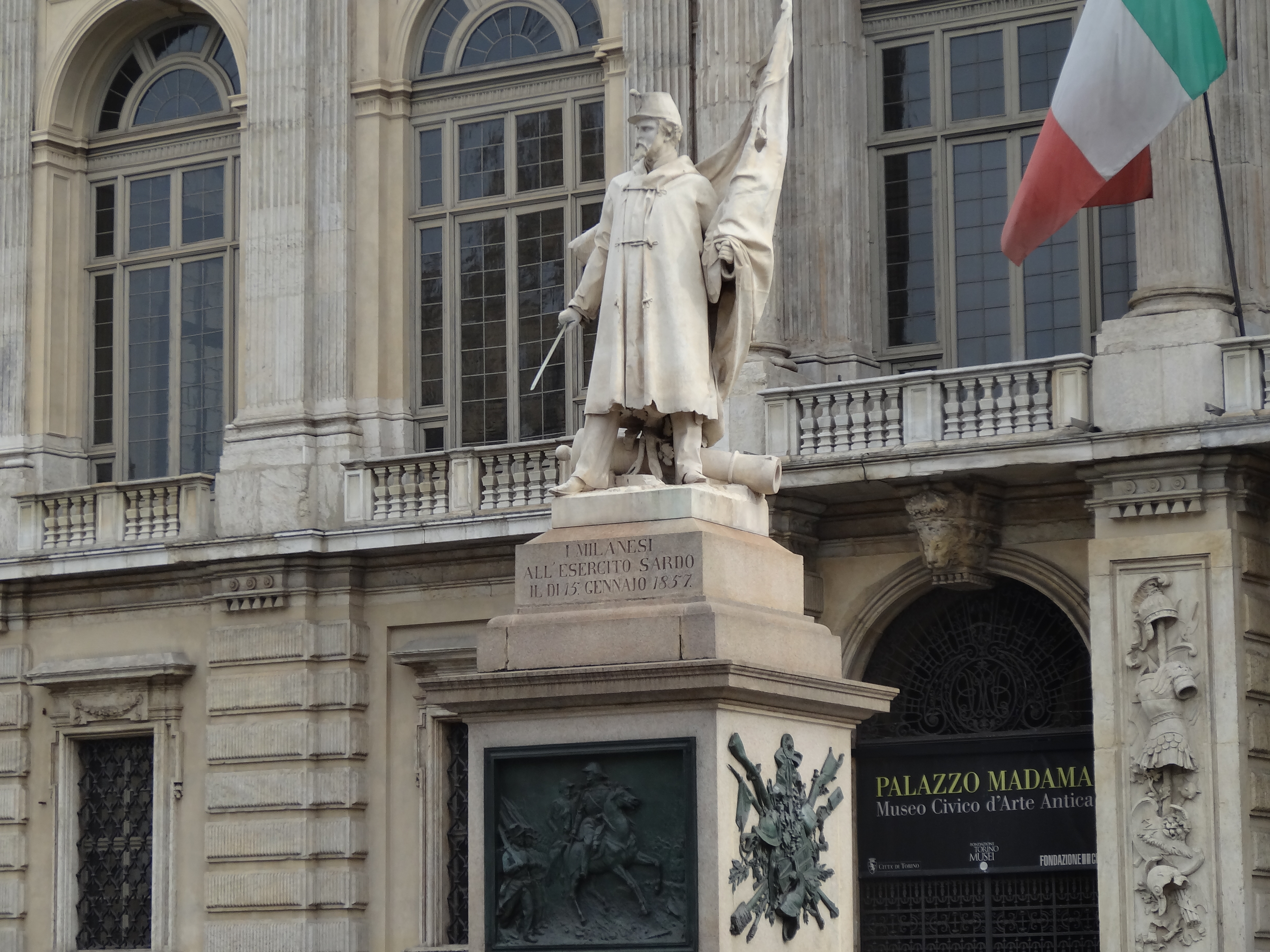
A defiant monument to the Sardinian troops, erected by Milanese exiles during the triumphant visit to Milan of Austrian Emperor Franz Joseph, 15 January 1857, stands before the Palazzo Madama.

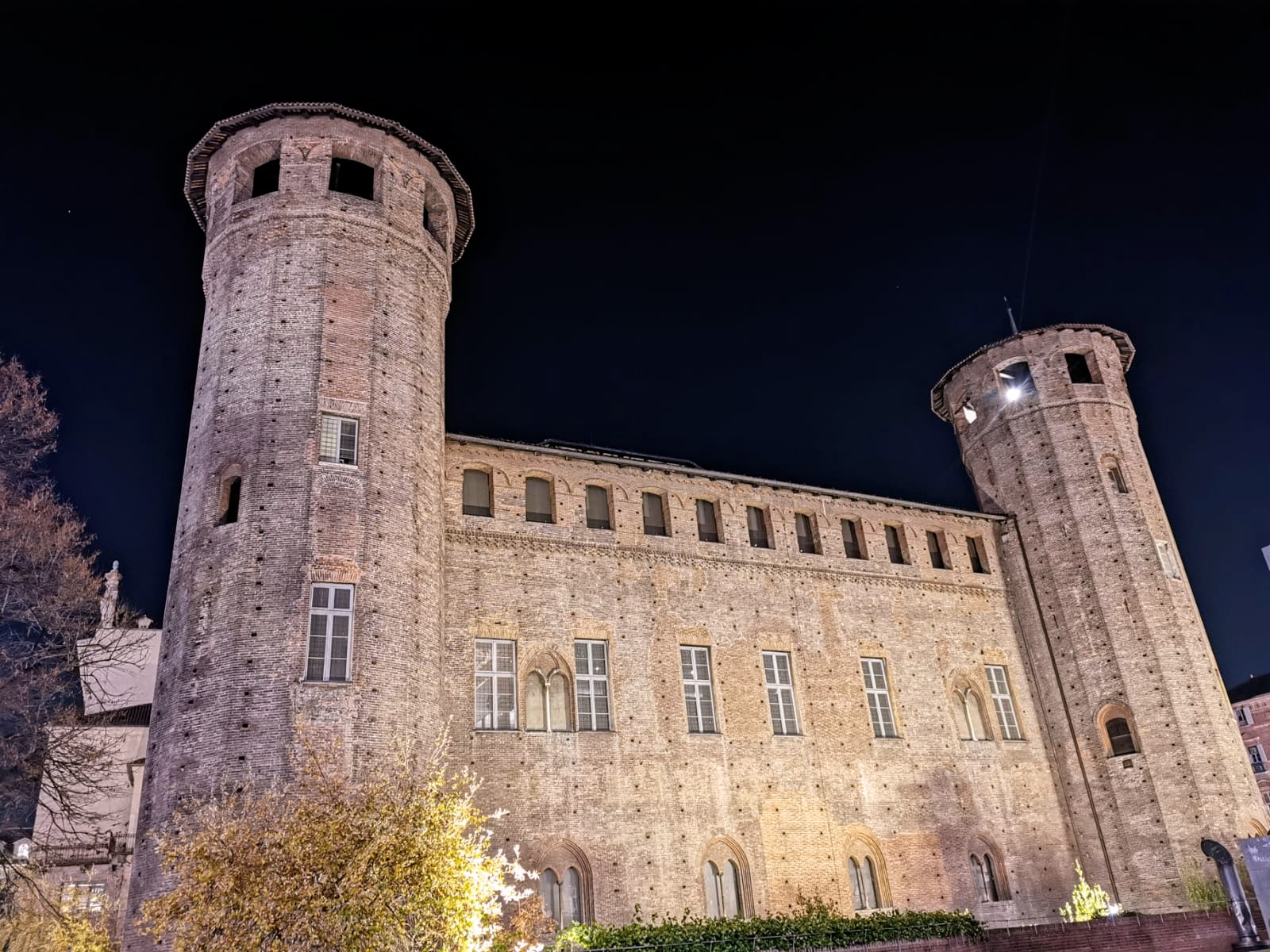
Palazzo Madama at night

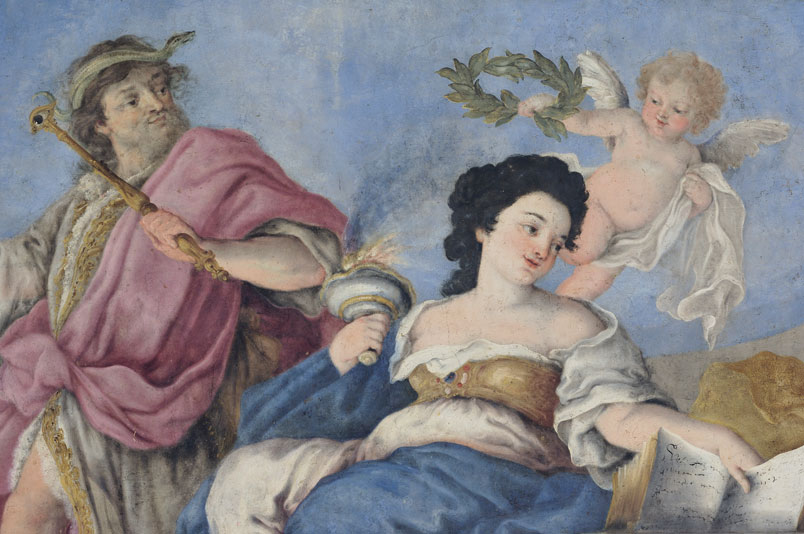
Triumph of virtue of Madama Reale by Domenico Guidobono in the Palazzo Madama

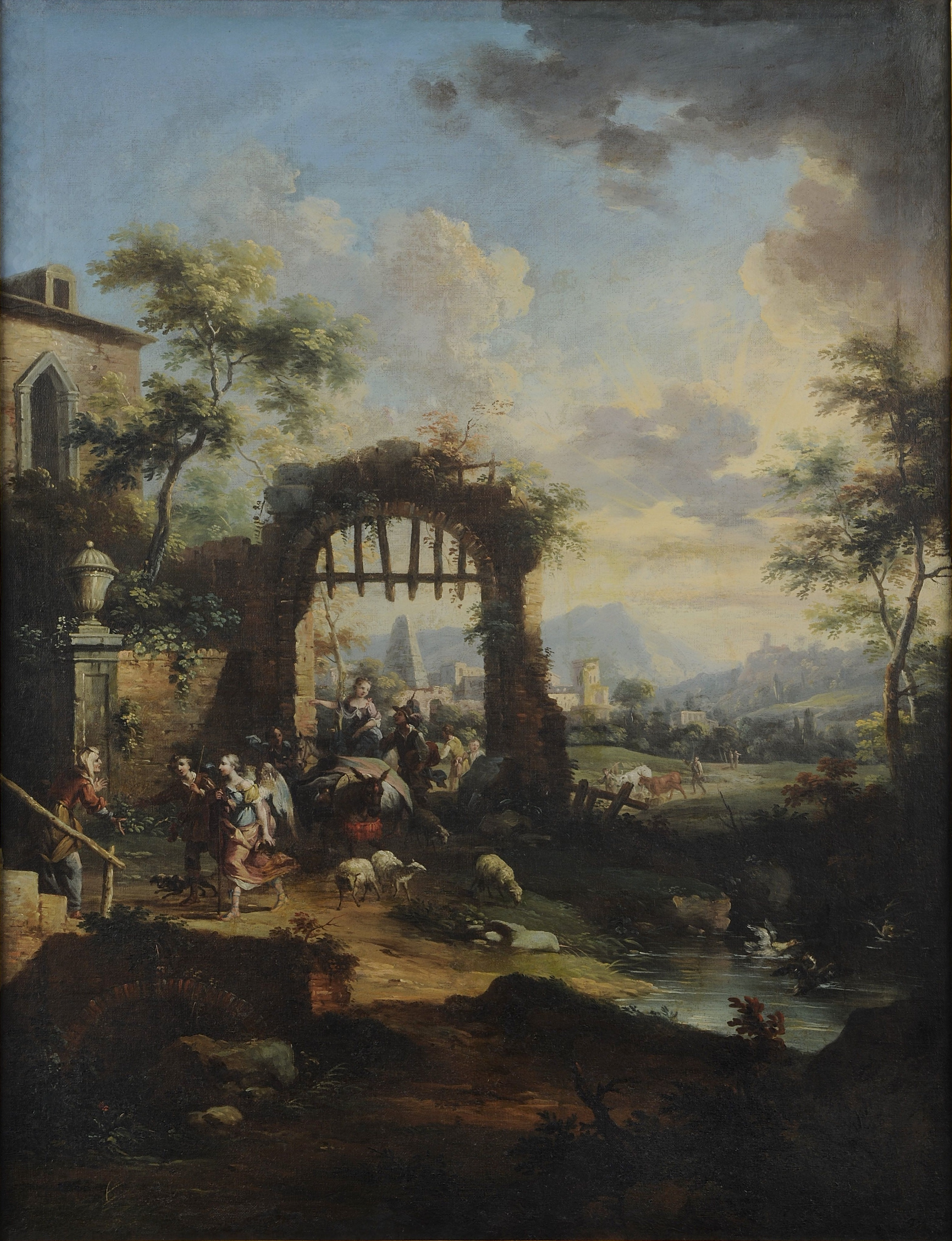
Vittorio Amedeo Cignaroli

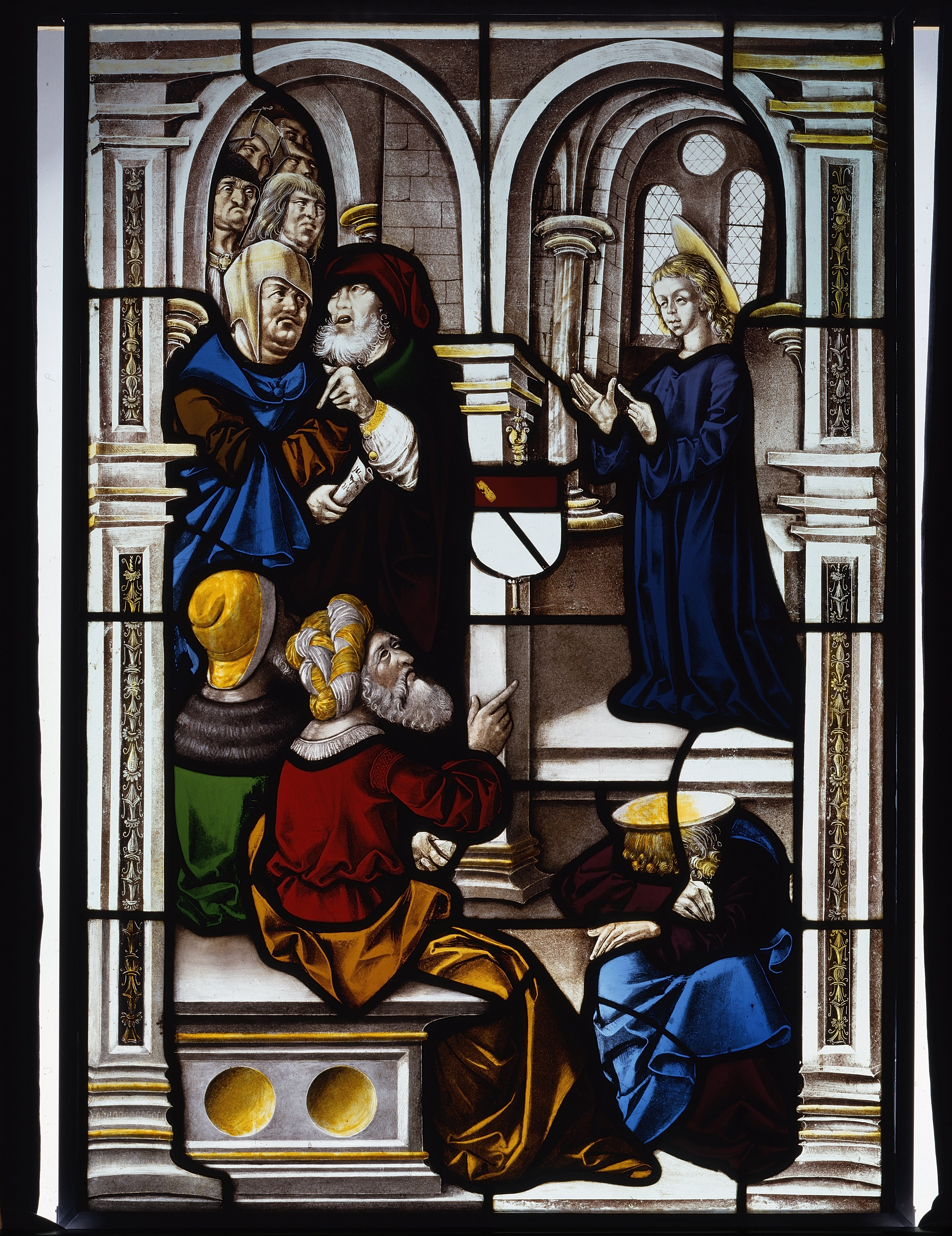
Pietro Vaser

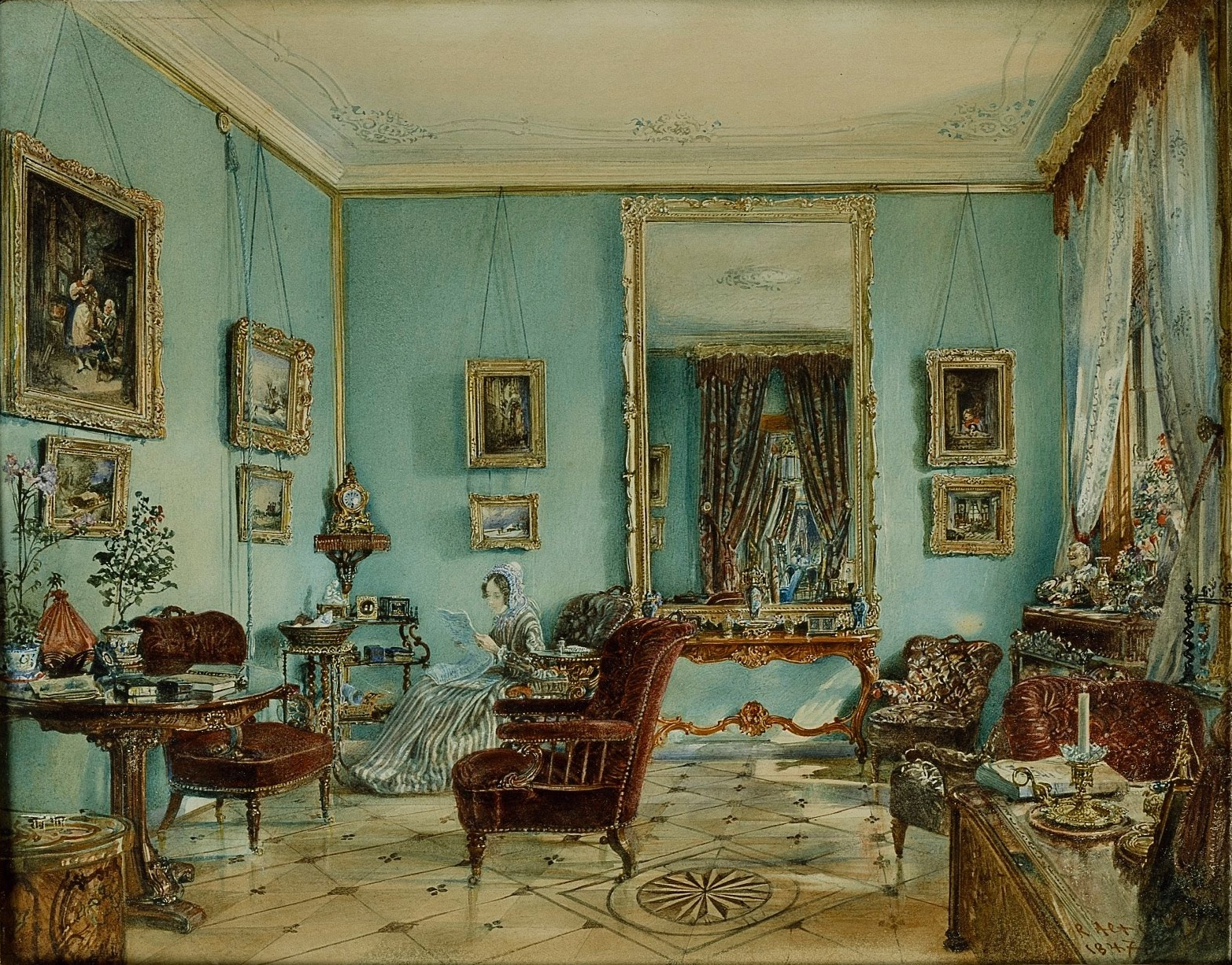
Rudolf von Alt

== See also ==
- List of Baroque residences
