= Peter II of Portugal =

King of Portugal from 1683 to 1706

Peter II
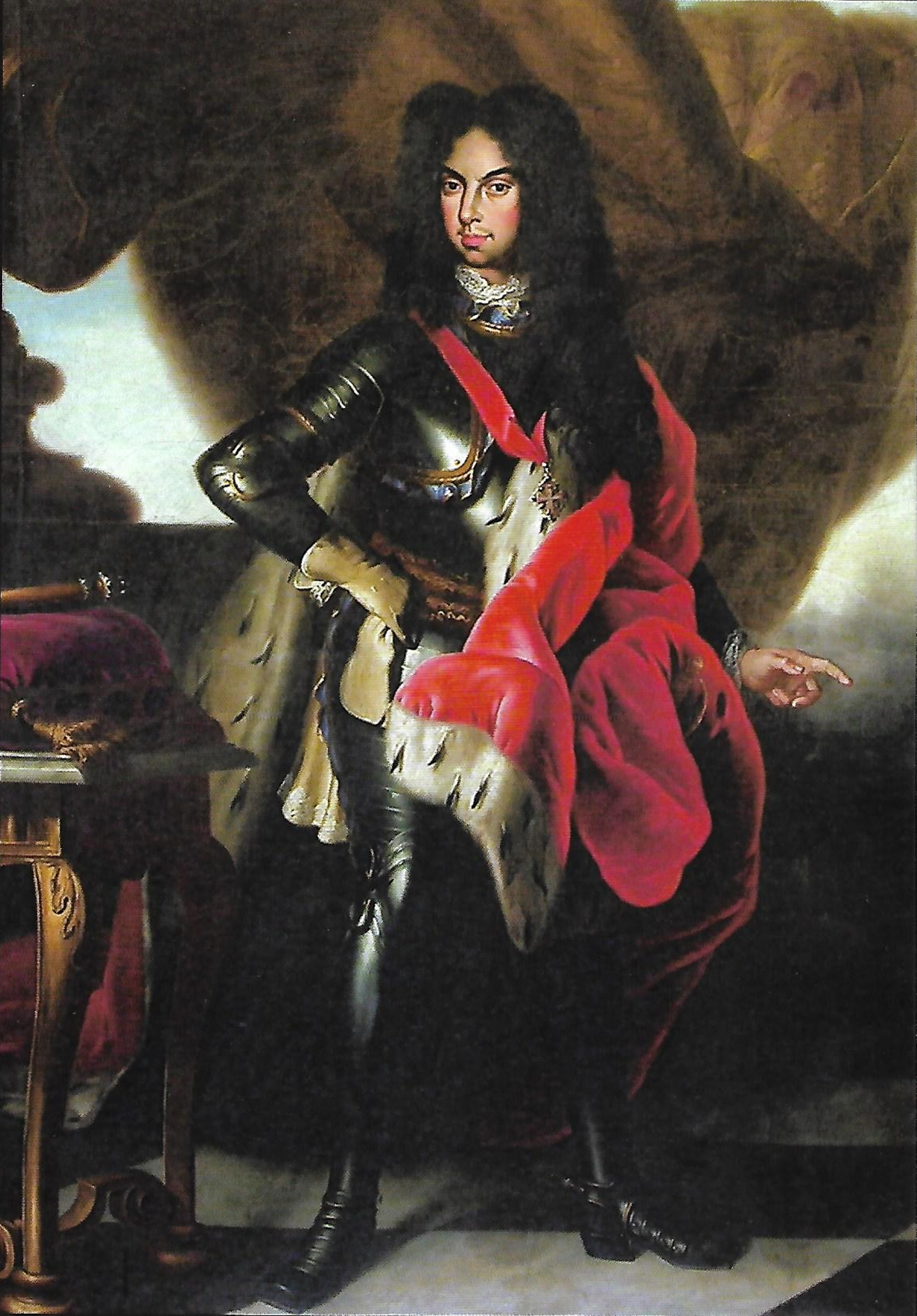

King of Portugal
- Reign: 12 September 1683 – 9 December 1706
- Predecessor: Afonso VI
- Successor: John V

Regent of Portugal
- Regency: 27 January 1668 – 12 September 1683
- Monarch: Afonso VI
- Born: 26 April 1648; Ribeira Palace, Lisbon, Portugal
- Died: 9 December 1706 (aged 58); Palhavã Palace, Lisbon, Portugal
- Burial: Pantheon of the House of Braganza
- Spouses: Maria Francisca of Savoy (m. 1668; died 1683) Maria Sofia of Neuburg (m. 1687; died 1699)
- Issue Detail: Isabel Luísa, Princess of Beira; João, Prince of Brazil; João V Infante Francisco, Duke of Beja; Infante António; Infanta Teresa; Infante Manuel, Count of Ourém; Infanta Francisca
- House: Braganza
- Father: John IV of Portugal
- Mother: Luisa de Guzmán

Dom Pedro II (Peter II; 26 April 1648 – 9 December 1706), nicknamed the Pacific (Português: o Pacífico) was King of Portugal from 1683 until his death, previously serving as regent for his brother Afonso VI from 1668 until his own accession. He was the fifth and last child of John IV and Luisa de Guzmán.

== Early life ==
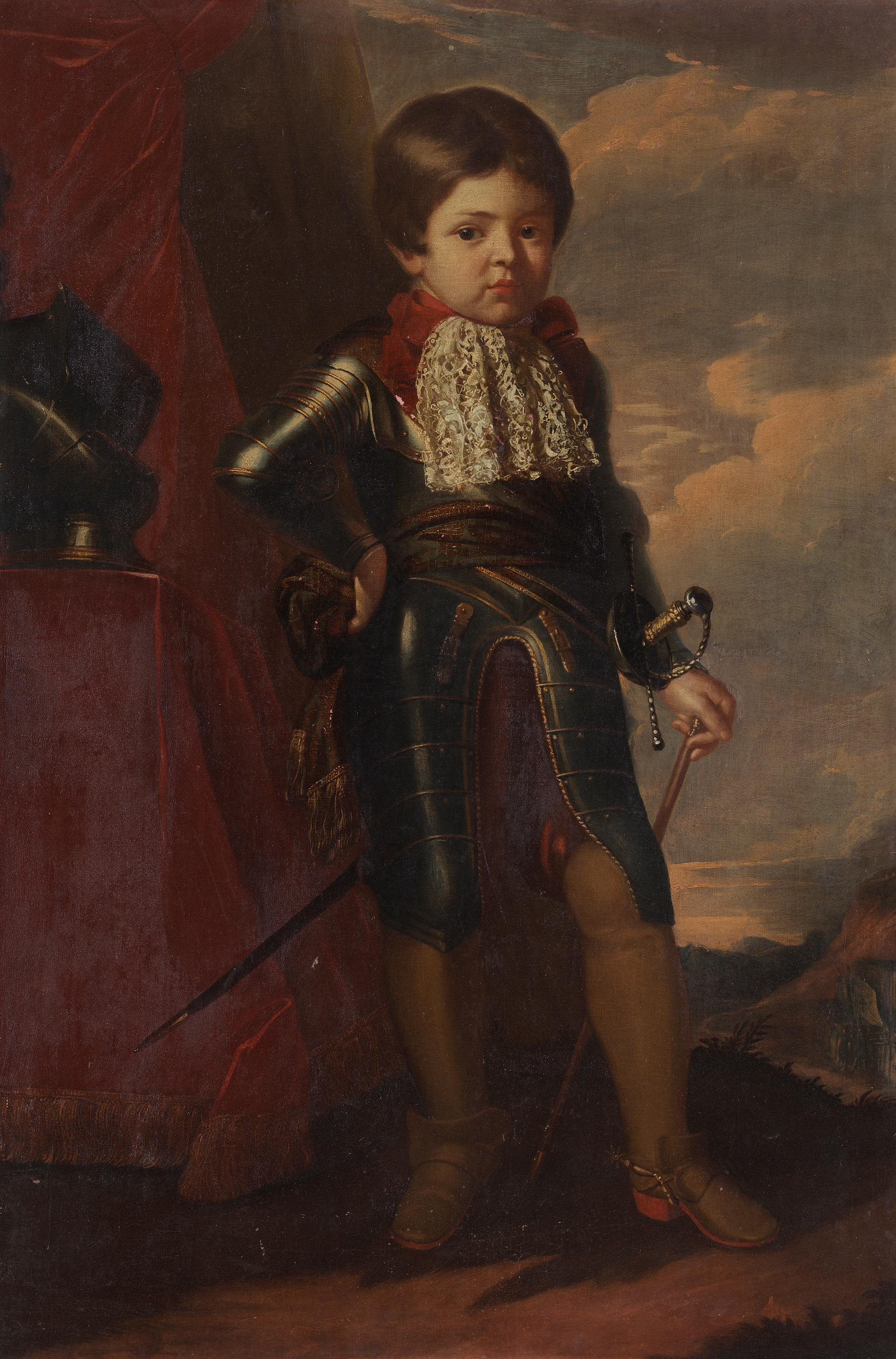
Peter II as a young child, attributed to Nicolas Mignard

Third son of King John IV and Queen Luisa, Peter was created Duke of Beja and Lord of the House of the Infantado.

Following his father's death, his mother became regent for the new king Afonso VI, Peter's elder, partially paralyzed, and mentally unstable brother. In 1662, Afonso put his mother away in a convent and assumed control of the state. In January 1668, shortly before Spanish recognition of Portugal's restoration of independence, Peter acquired political ascendancy over his brother and was appointed regent, banishing Afonso to the Azores and, later, Sintra where he died in 1683. Peter thereupon inherited the throne.

Peter not only inherited his brother's throne but also wed his former spouse, Queen Marie-Françoise of Savoy (1646–1683). They had one daughter, Isabel Luísa, Princess of Beira (1669–90), who was heir presumptive.

== Rule (1668–1706) ==
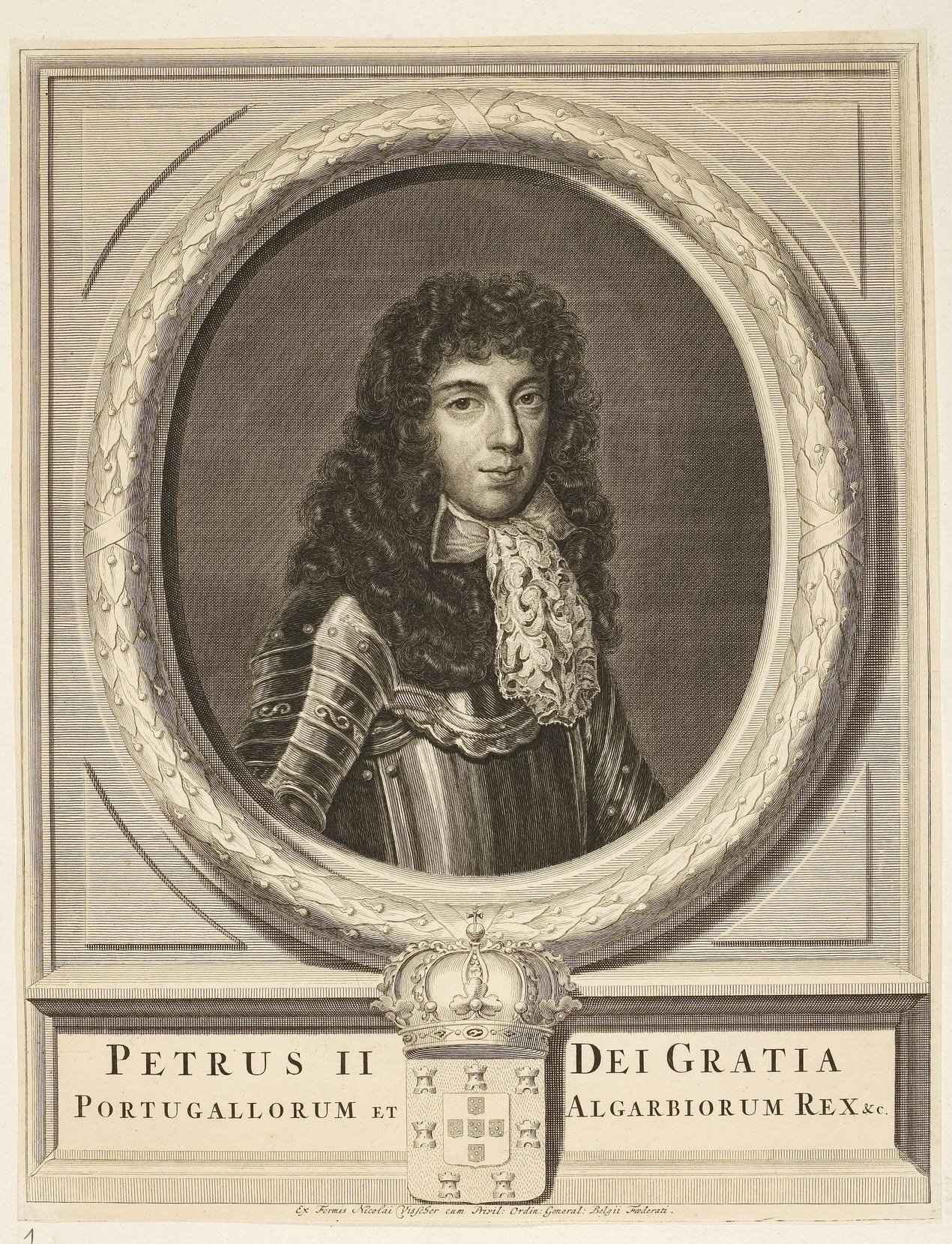
Engraving of King Peter II by Nicolaes Visscher II.

Peter consolidated Portugal's independence with the signing of the Treaty of Lisbon in 1668, putting the Portuguese Restoration War, that began in 1640, to an end. He formed an alliance with England and had its decisive support based on marriage clauses that united Charles II of England with his sister Catherine of Braganza in 1661. Portugal ceded Tangier and Bombay as a dowry, and compromised to transfer to the English the majority of the places recovered from the Dutch, to share in half the commerce of cinnamon, to install English families with the same privileges of the Portuguese families in Goa, Cochin, Diu, Bahia, Pernambuco and Rio de Janeiro. In exchange, England would give Lisbon military support, protecting Portuguese shipments in the Mediterranean and the coasts of Lisbon and Porto.

After his coup in 1667, Peter restored the nobility to their full power and government by councils of nobles reached a high point during his reign because he required their support in deposing Alfonso VI. However, by the end of his reign, Peter centralized the monarchy's power and dissolved the excessive strength of the nobility. His successors would rule as absolute monarchs, and the Cortes would not be assembled for more than a century.

His long tenure was one of important accomplishments. In 1671 he conceded freedom of commerce to the English residing in Portugal and began the establishment of textile manufactures. Isabel Luísa was proclaimed heir presumptive to the throne at the Portuguese Cortes of 1674, Peter promulgating a letter on the regencies and tutorships of Kings to better found the rights of his daughter.

In 1674 his main concern was to improve the defenses of the realm, asking for contributions from the Junta dos Três Estados to the keeping of border garrisons, its paraphernalia and indispensable works in castles and forts. The Cortes didn't attend to totality of his request, but the great apprehension was in the coastal defense. Veríssimo Serrão, in his book "History of Portugal", Volume V, page 213 says the following, "The shipments from India and Brazil were the main object of greed so that the Crown was obliged to arm a fleet of 11 boats. (...) The squadron left the Tejo on 21 July 1675, under the command of Pedro Jacques de Magalhães. (...) But the results of such a costly undertaking were none."

There was a legal impediment to the marriage of his daughter with her cousin, the Duke of Savoy. The so-called Law of the Cortes of Lamego prevented the marriage of an heiress with a foreign prince. This alleged document became fundamental law of the Realm in 1640. The Cortes, called on 1 November 1679, proceeded with the derogation. By then the ambassador of Savoy, the Marquis of Ornano, had come to Lisbon to celebrate the marriage by proxy. But it would all turn ineffective to the extent that the embassy of the Duke of Cadaval, sent to Turin in May 1682, did not reach or did not finish the project, by pressures, perhaps, of Louis XIV on the dynasty of Savoy.

In 1683, Queen Maria Francisca died. In the court there was a strong French party, headed by the Duke of Cadaval, the then Count of Vila Maior and by the Viscount of Ponte de Lima, but others favored a closer alliance with Spain. By marrying again, Peter II chose the sister of the Queen of Spain, daughter of Philipp Wilhelm, Elector Palatine. The new queen, Maria Sophia of Neuburg, never influenced political life, maintaining a low profile. The couple had eight children, including the younger John, who succeeded his father in 1706 as King John V of Portugal.

=== European policy ===
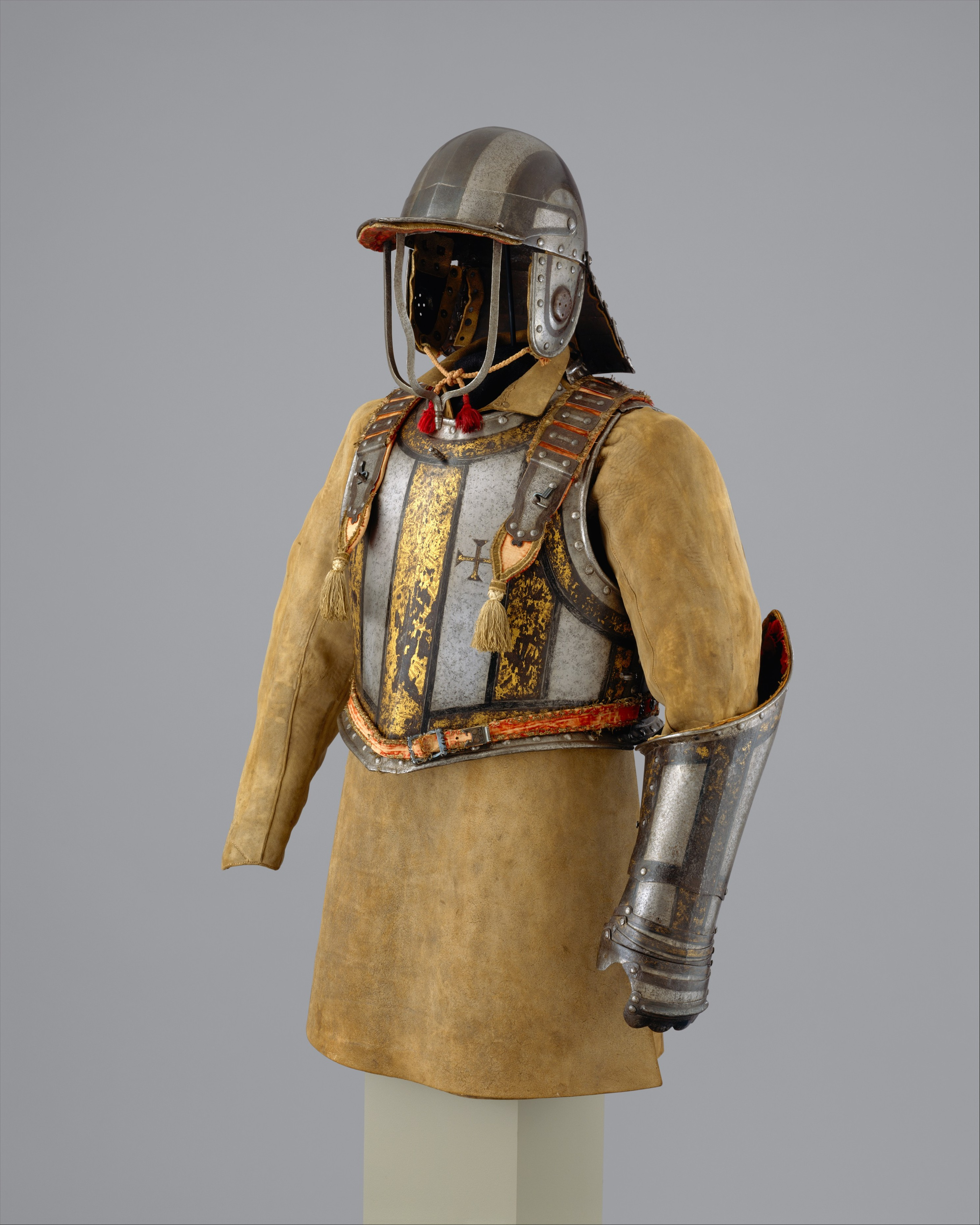
English-made cavalry armour of Pedro II, King of Portugal, consisting of a cuirass, bridle-hand gauntlet, buff coat and 3-barred lobster tailed pot helmet. These are of very high quality.

Peter initially supported France and Spain in the War of Spanish Succession (1701–1714), but on 16 May 1703, Portugal and England signed the Methuen Treaty. This trade accord granted mutual commercial privileges for Portuguese wine and English textile traders and would later give England significant influence in the Portuguese economy. This was followed in December 1703 by a military alliance between Portugal, Austria and England for an invasion of Spain. Portuguese and Allied forces, under the command of the Marquis of Minas, captured Madrid in 1706, during the campaign which ended in the Allied defeat at Almansa.

=== Brazil ===
Peter obtained papal approval for the elevation of the Bahia bishopric to the status of archbishopric, and the creation of the bishoprics of Olinda and Rio de Janeiro in 1676. In 1677 saw the creation of the bishopric of Maranhão, directly subordinated to the archbishopric of Lisbon. In 1686, via decree from the Missionary Regiment, the privileges of the Jesuits in the interior of the Northern region were restricted. There was, however, resistance to the reordering process of the colonial administration, such as the Beckman revolt of 1684 that sublevated the Maranhão colonists against the monopoly of the General Company of Commerce of Grão-Pará and Maranhão and the rise of the Tapuias in the 1680s in various regions of the Northeast.

The discovery of gold in the interior of Caetés, Minas Gerais, at the end of the 17th century, began an age of economic prosperity and administrative change. The year 1693 saw the creation of the Captaincy of São Paulo and Minas Gerais. The Intendancy of Minas Gerais was formed in 1702. This period saw the destruction of the Quilombo dos Palmares, Alagoas, in 1695.

The King fixed the basis of his Brazilian policy in two main points: the importation of precious metals and stones and the expansion of the borders of the colony to the banks of the Río de la Plata. He sent the Viscount of Barbacena to Brazil with instructions to encourage mining exploration. The reputation of the Paulistas was such that, urged by Barbacena, Peter wrote to twelve frontiersmen Piratinganos, and provided them with the "incomparable honor" of a direct summoning them to place their employment at the royal service.

A 640 réis coin minted under the reign of Peter II

Under his reign the Casa da Moeda do Brasil was created on 8 March 1694. The King ceded his seigniorage rights, tribute owed to him, in favor of the better functioning of this institution, that minted the first Brazilian coins for usage within the colony. These coins of 2,000 and 4,000 réis in gold, and 640, 320, 160, 80, 40 and 20 réis in silver amplified and diversified the circulating midst in Brazil.

By the end of Peter's reign, there were two big problems in Brazil: the dispute over the Colónia do Sacramento that, even though since 1680 recognized as Portuguese territory, was occupied by the Spanish in 1705, and the first conflicts between Paulistas and Emboabas, competing outsiders, including metropolitan people (ie. people from European Portugal), who arrived in the region in search of gold.

== Death ==
Beginning in 1703 the King went through times of deep drowsiness that doctors attributed to a "downflow of 'estilicido'", i.e., severe infection of the larynx. On 5 December 1706 he was stricken with a "legitimate pleurisy", that derived a seizure, with which he lost consciousness. The bloodletting from his feet did not yield results, and on 9 December, the attack became fatal. It is believed nowadays that the King suffered from a liver disease, because the autopsy found "a part of his liver twisted where 25 stones in the gall could be found". Other authors argue that Dom Pedro II died due to a slow agony caused by syphilis. He died in the Palhavã Palace, in Lisbon.

He was the last surviving child of John IV of Portugal, and is buried in Lisbon in the Pantheon of the Braganzas.

== Assessment ==
Portrait by Miguel António do Amaral, c. 1780

Historian Veríssimo Serrão says of The King in his "History of Portugal", Volume IV, page 233:

"A coeval historian extolled his physical qualities, skilled both in arms as in horseback bullfighting, having an agility and strength that predisposed him to the exercise of violence. It was during his time that the Palace of Salvaterra de Magos became again the favorite place of court, Pedro II settling there in the months of January and February, to devote himself to the sport of riding. (...) Master of a great memory, the monarch never refused an audience to whoever asked it, was it day or night, delighted to listen to others and to discuss the issues in the smallest details. This quality was (...) one of his biggest flaws, because he always wanted to hear the opinion of advisers, fact that led to him dilating the problems. His reign aimed to rebuild the country, which had been weakened by the wars of Restoration. Since 1693 he could dispose of the gold from Brazil that gave to this work the decisive push that Portugal needed. But the participation in the Wars of the Spanish Succession went against the national interests."

He was tall, well proportioned, with dark eyes and dark hair.

He earned the nickname "the Pacific", because peace was made with Spain during his regency in 1668.

== Ancestry ==
Ancestors of Peter II of Portugal

8. João, 6th Duke of Braganza
4. Teodósio, 7th Duke of Braganza
9. Catarina of Portugal
2. John IV of Portugal
10. Juan, 5th Duke of Frías
5. Ana de Velasco y Girón
11. María Téllez-Girón y Guzmán
1. Peter II of Portugal
12. Alonso, 7th Duke of Medina Sidonia
6. Manuel, 8th Duke of Medina Sidonia
13. Ana de Silva y Mendoza
3. Luisa de Guzmán
14. Francisco, 1st Duke of Lerma
7. Juana de Sandoval y la Cerda
15. Catalina de la Cerda y Portugal

== Marriages and issue ==
| Name | Birth | Death | Notes |
|---|---|---|---|
By Marie Françoise of Savoy-Nemours (1646–1683; married 2 April 1668)
| Infanta Isabel Luísa of Portugal | 6 January 1669 | 21 October 1690 | 3rd Princess of Beira |
By Maria Sophia of Neuburg (6 August 1666 – 4 August 1699; married in 1687)
| João, Prince of Brazil | 30 August 1688 | 17 September 1688 | Prince of Brazil and 12th Duke of Braganza |
| John V of Portugal | 22 October 1689 | 31 July 1750 | Prince of Brazil from 1697; succeeded Peter as King of Portugal |
| Infante Francisco of Portugal | 25 May 1691 | 21 July 1742 | Duke of Beja |
| Infante António of Portugal | 15 March 1695 | 20 October 1757 |
| Infanta Teresa Maria of Portugal | 24 February 1696 | 16 February 1704 |
| Infante Manuel of Portugal | 3 August 1697 | 3 August 1766 | Count of Ourém. |
| Infanta Francisca Josefa of Portugal | 30 January 1699 | 15 July 1736 |
By Maria da Cruz Mascarenhas (c. 1655-?)
| Luísa de Braganza | 9 January 1679 | 23 December 1732 | Natural daughter; Duchess of Cadaval through marriage first to Luís Ambrósio de Melo, 2nd Duke of Cadaval, and then to Jaime Álvares Pereira de Melo, 3rd Duke of Cadaval |
By Anne Armande du Verger (c. 1660-?)
| Miguel of Braganza | 15 October 1699 | 13 January 1724 | Natural son |
By Francisca Clara da Silva (c. 1650-?)
| José de Braganza | 6 May 1703 | 3 June 1756 | Natural son; Archbishop of Braga |

== Bibliography ==
- BRAGA (Paulo Drumond) – D. PEDRO II. UMA BIOGRAFIA / TRIBUNA DA HISTÓRIA / 2006. The best biography of the king.
- Davidson, Lillias Campbell (1908). Catherine of Bragança, infanta of Portugal, & queen-consort of England.
- Dyer, Thomas Henry (1877). Modern Europe Vol III.
- Gregg, Edward (1984). Queen Anne. London: Ark Paperbacks. ISBN 978-0-7448-0018-0.
- Marques, Antonio Henrique R. de Oliveira (1976). History of Portugal. ISBN 978-0-231-08353-9.
- McCarthy, Justin (1902). The Reign of Queen Anne. London: Chatto & Windus.
- McMurdo, Edward (1889). The history of Portugal, from the Commencement of the Monarchy to the Reign of Alfonso III. London: Sampson Low, Marston, Searle, & Rivington.
- PERES (Damião) – A DIPLOMACIA PORTUGUESA / E A SUCESSÃO DE ESPANHA / (1700–1704) / PORTUCALENSE EDITORA, LDª / 1931. The work recounts past events during the war of succession, in the reign of D. Peter II, and it is an important history of diplomatic relations at the time.
- PEREIRA (Ana Cristina Duarte) – PRINCESAS E INFANTAS DE PORTUGAL / (1640–1736) / EDIÇÕES COLIBRI / 2008. The work deals with various princes and infantas of Portugal, legitimate and illegitimate, from 1640 to 1736, from the point of personal and political view, tracing the route of these stateswomen in the legitimization and consolidation of the Braganza dynasty.
- Livermore, H.V. (1969). A New History of Portugal. Cambridge University Press. ISBN 9780521095716.
- LOURENÇO (Maria Paula Marçal) – D. PEDRO II / CÍRCULO DE LEITORES / 2006. The work is part of the collection of biographies of the kings of Portugal and narrated in an exemplary way the life and time of D. Peter II.
- Ogg, David (1934). England in the Reign of Charles II. Oxford University Press.
- Sousa, António Caetano de. História genealógica da Casa Real portuguesa (in Portuguese). Vol. VII. Lisbon: Silviana.
- Stephens, H. Morse (1891). The Story of Portugal. New York: G. P. Putnam's Sons.

Peter II of Portugal House of Braganza Cadet branch of the House of Aviz Born: 26 April 1648 Died: 9 December 1706
Regnal titles
| Preceded by Afonso VI | King of Portugal; 12 September 1683 – 9 December 1706 | Succeeded by John V |
