= The King's Whore =

1990 film

- Film poster
- Directed by: Axel Corti
- Written by: Axel Corti; Frederic Raphael; Jacques Tournier; Daniel Vigne
- Produced by: Maurice Bernart
- Starring: Timothy Dalton; Valeria Golino
- Cinematography: Gernot Roll
- Edited by: Bryan Oates
- Music by: Gabriel Yared
- Distributed by: Premiere Distributing (United Kingdom)
- Release date: 14 November 1990
- Running time: 138 minutes
- Countries: France; Italy; United Kingdom
- Languages: French; English

The King's Whore (French: La putain du roi, Italian: La puttana del re) is a 1990 drama film directed by Axel Corti, starring Timothy Dalton and Valeria Golino. It was entered into the 1990 Cannes Film Festival.

== Plot ==
Set in the 17th century, an Italian nobleman weds an impoverished countess, who is wooed by the Duke of Piedmont and faces pressure from his entire court to succumb to his wishes.

== Cast ==
- Timothy Dalton as Vittorio Amedeo II
- Valeria Golino as Jeanne de Luynes
- Stéphane Freiss as Le Comte di Verrua
- Robin Renucci as Charles de Luynes
- Margaret Tyzack as La Comtesse douairière
- Eleanor David as La Reine
- Paul Crauchet as Le Duc de Luynes
- Amy Werba as Heloïse
- Franco Valobra as Le Duc d'Aoste
- Francesca Reggiani as Marie Christine
- Leonardo Ruta as Le Prince Vittorio
- Luigi Bonos as 2nd Priest (as Gigi Bonos)
- Elisabeth Kaza as Countess Trevie (as Elizabeth Kaza)
- Lea Padovani as Countess Cumiana
- Anna Bonaiuto as Countess Longhi

== Release ==
Originally picked up by Miramax Films for U.S. distribution, the film was never given the benefit of a U.S. theatrical release. The film was shown at various film festivals and in theaters overseas. The film was finally released on videocassette in 1993 by Vidmark Entertainment in the United States and in Canada by C/FP Video. In 2002, the film was released on a budget DVD by Platinum Disc.
