= Anna Canalis di Cumiana =

Italian noblewoman (1680–1769)

- Marchesa of Spigno; Countess of San Sebastiano
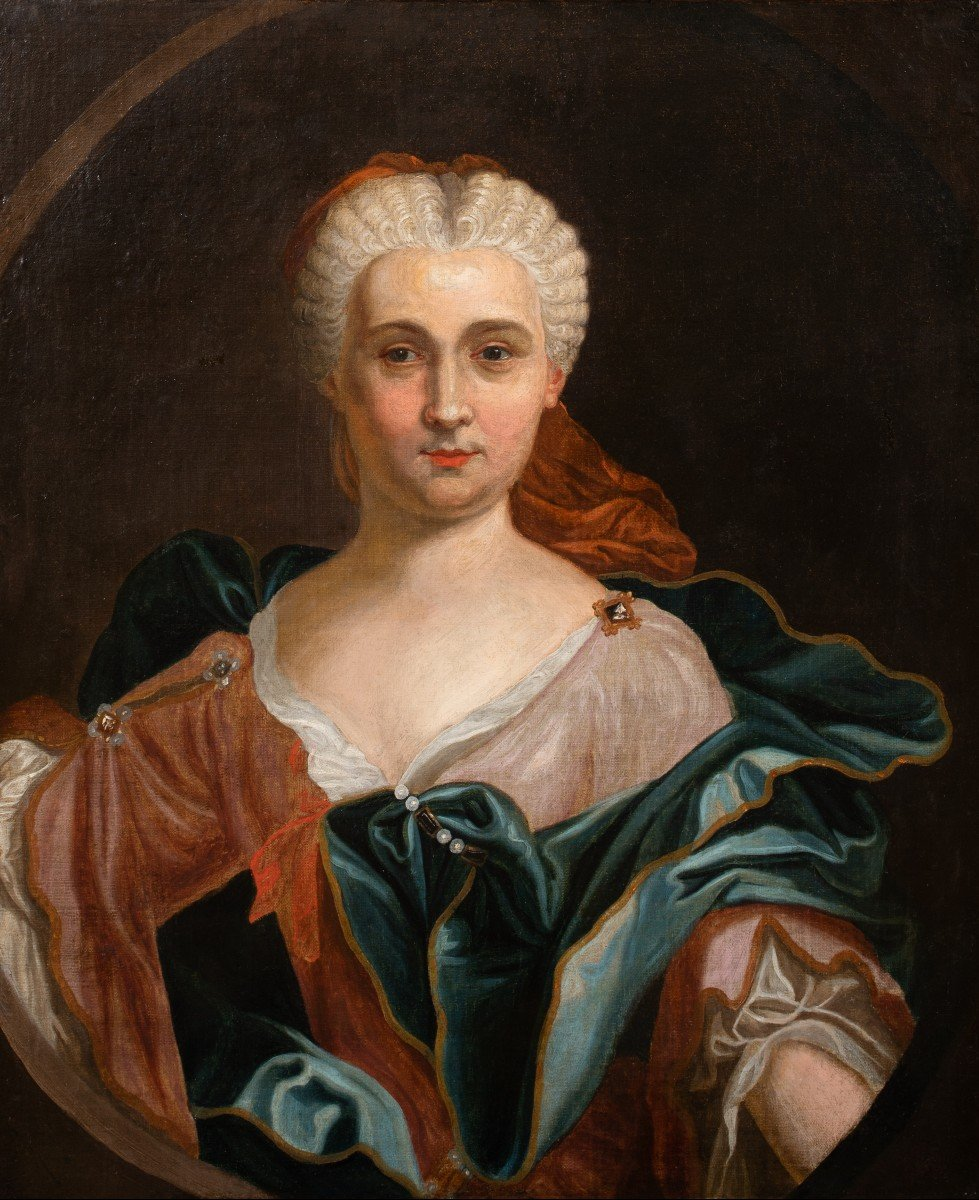
- Portrait c. 1700
- Full name: Anna Carlotta Teresa Canalis di Cumiana
- Born: 23 April 1680; Palazzo Canalis, Turin
- Died: 13 April 1769 (aged 88); Convent of the Visitation, Pinerolo
- Spouses: Ignazio Francesco Novarina, Conte di San Sebastiano; Victor Amadeus II, King of Sardinia
- Issue Detail: Pietro, Marquis of Spigno
- Father: Francesco Maurizio Canalis, Conte di Cumiana
- Mother: Monica Francesca San Martino d'Agliè dei Marchesi di San Germano

Coat of arms of the Canalis family

Anna Carlotta Teresa Canalis di Cumiana (23 April 1680 – 13 April 1769) was a playwright and the morganatic wife of Victor Amadeus II, King of Sardinia. She was created Marchesa of Spigno.

== Early life ==
Born at the Palazzo Canalis, Turin, in 1680, she was the daughter of Francesco Maurizio Canalis, Count of Cumiana and his wife, Monica Francesca San Martino d'Agliè dei Marchesi di San Germano.

== Lady in waiting ==
Receiving education as a nun at the Convent of the Visitation in Turin, she was introduced to the ducal court of Savoy in 1695. She was made a lady-in-waiting to Marie Jeanne of Savoy, mother of the ruler, Victor Amadeus II. She was styled as Mademoiselle de Cumiana.

She was married on 21 April 1703 to Ignazio Francesco Novarina, Count of San Sebastiano (1680-1724), by whom she had eight children. The marriage was arranged by Duchess Marie Jeanne, to whose household she belonged and who had noticed her son's wandering eye looking in the direction of the beautiful and unmarried Anna.

The couple's first child is widely believed to have been fathered by Victor Amadeus but San Sebastiano accepted paternity. Victor Amadeus and Anna were in correspondence and she soon became a confidante in place of his wife, Anne Marie. Leaving the court in 1723 with her husband who had a good career, she soon became a widow at her husband's death on 25 September 1724. Left with limited means, Victor Amadeus called her back to court where she was made a lady-in-waiting to Polyxena, Princess of Piedmont, wife of Charles Emmanuel, Prince of Piedmont and heir apparent of Victor Amadeus II. She was later elevated to the position of Polyxena's lady-in-waiting, where she was given a position equivalent to Lady of the Bedchamber.

== Marriage to King Victor Amadeus ==
In August 1728 Victor Amadeus's consort Anne Marie d'Orléans died after a series of heart attacks. Two years later he married Anna in a private ceremony on 12 August 1730 in the Royal Chapel in Turin, having obtained permission from Pope Clement XII. Victor Amadeus created her Marchesa of Spigno. The title was attached to a fief of the Holy Roman Empire, acquired as spoils of the War of the Spanish Succession and subsequently owned by an illegitimate brother of Victor Amadeus.

The couple made their marriage public on 3 September 1730, much to the dismay of the court. A month later, Victor Amadeus announced his wish to abdicate the throne and did so in a ceremony at the Castle of Rivoli on the day of his marriage. His son succeeded him as Charles Emmanuel III.

Taking the style of King Victor Amadeus, he and Anna moved into the château de Chambéry outside the capital. The couple took a small retinue of servants and Victor Amadeus was kept informed of matters of state. Under the influence of Anna and despite having had a stroke in 1731, Victor Amadeus decided he wanted to resume his tenure on the throne and informed his son of his decision. Arrested by his son, he was transported to the Castle of Moncalieri and Anna was taken to a house for reformed prostitutes at the Castle of Ceva but was later allowed to return to the Castle of Rivoli where her husband was moved. She was returned to him on 12 April. The stroke seemed to have affected Victor Amadeus in a way which caused him to later turn violent toward his wife, blaming her for his misfortunes.

Victor Amadeus II, Anna's morganatic husband by Mytens who created her Marchioness of Spigno

King Victor Amadeus having died in September 1732, Anna was imprisoned in the Convent of San Giuseppe di Carignano. She was later moved to the Convent of the Visitation in Pinerolo where she died aged 88. Her son later left the Savoy court in disgrace but succeeded to the marquisate of Spigno. She was buried at Pinerolo in a grave without a headstone.

== Issue ==
- Paola Novarina dei conti di San Sebastiano (b.1708)
- Paolo Federico Novarina dei conti di San Sebastiano (b.1710)
- Carlo Novarina dei conti di San Sebastiano (b. 1711)
- Giacinta Novarina dei conti di San Sebastiano (b.1712)
- Chiara Novarina dei conti di San Sebastiano (b.1714)
- Pietro Novarina, Marchese of Spigno (b.1715), married Adelaide Cisa di Grésy and three daughters:
  - Felicita Novarina dei marchesi di Spigno, married Girolamo Miglioretti di Bourcet
  - Angelica Novarina dei marchesi di Spigno, married Giuseppe Dattili della Torre
  - Luisa Onoratia Novarina dei marchesi di Spigno, died young
- Luigi Novarina dei conti di San Sebastiano (b.1718) married Matilde Scarampi del Camino;
- Biagio Novarina dei conti di San Sebastiano (b.1722)

== Sources ==
- The Gentleman's and London magazine: or monthly chronologer, 1741-1794, J. Exshaw., 1741
- Symcox, Geoffrey: Victor Amadeus II: absolutism in the Savoyard State, 1675-1730, University of California Press, 1983, ISBN 978-0-520-04974-1
- Vitelleschi, Marchese: The romance of Savoy, Victor Amadeus II. and his Stuart bride Volume II, Harvard College Library, New York, 1905
