= Vittorio Francesco, Marquis of Susa =

Vittorio Francesco di Savoia
- Marquis di Susa
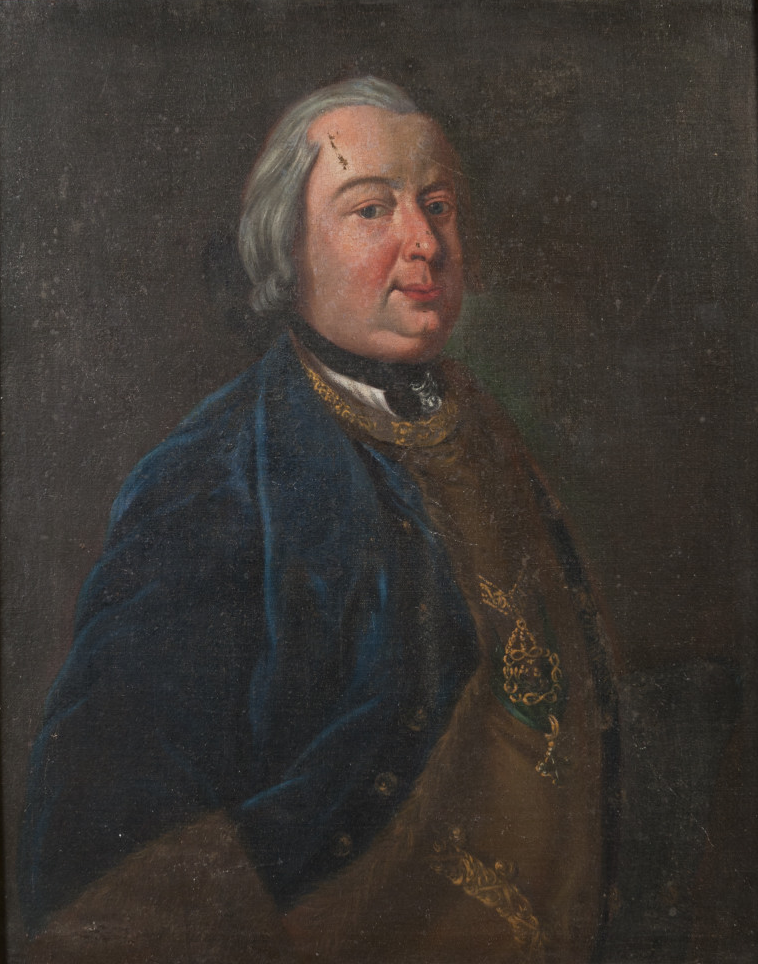
- Born: 10 December 1694; Turin, Savoy
- Died: 20 March 1762 (aged 67)
- Spouse: Maria Lucrezia Franchi
Names
- Vittorio Francesco Fillippo di Savoia
- House: Savoy
- Father: Victor Amadeus II of Sardinia
- Mother: Jeanne Baptiste d'Albert de Luynes

Vittorio Francesco of Savoy (Vittorio Francesco Filippo; 10 December 1694 – 20 March 1762) was the illegitimate son of Victor Amadeus II of Sardinia and Jeanne Baptiste d'Albert de Luynes. He was styled as the Marquis of Susa.

== Biography ==
His mother, Madame de Verrue, was the French wife of a prominent Piedmontese diplomat working for the Duke of Savoy. At the Savoyard capital of Turin, the Duke of Savoy became infatuated with the young countess and in 1689, Jeanne Baptiste gave in to the duke's overture, encouraged by the Duchess of Savoy Anne Marie d'Orléans and her uncle, the French king Louis XIV.

When Victor Amadeus II became so obsessed with Jeanne Baptiste that he had her shut up from view of the court for some time, Jeanne Baptiste fled Savoy and sought refuge in France, ruled by Louis XIV. When Vittorio's mother fled Savoy in 1700, he and his sister Maria Vittoria Francesca of Savoy were left in Savoy and were cared for by a loving father.
Victor Amadeus II had them both legitimised and created them Marquis and Marchesa of Susa.

Vittorio had a military career and led the Piedmontese troops against a French-Spanish army in the Battle of Villafranca (1744), where he was taken prisoner.

He married in 1760 with Maria Lucrezia Franchi (died 1777), daughter of Gaspare Orazio Franchi, Count of Ponte Chianale. They had no children.

== Ancestry ==
Ancestors of Vittorio Francesco, Marquis of Susa

16. Charles Emmanuel I, Duke of Savoy
8. Victor Amadeus I, Duke of Savoy
17. Infanta Catherine Michelle of Spain
4. Charles Emmanuel II, Duke of Savoy
18. Henry IV of France
9. Christine Marie of France
19. Marie de' Medici
2. Victor Amadeus II of Sardinia
20. Henry of Savoy, Duke of Nemours
10. Charles Amadeus of Savoy, Duke of Nemours
21. Anne de Lorraine
5. Marie Jeanne of Savoy
22. César, Duke of Vendôme
11. Elisabeth de Bourbon
23. Françoise de Lorraine
1. Vittorio Francesco of Savoy
24. Honoré d'Albert, Seigneur de Luynes, de Cadenet, de Brantes
12. Charles Honoré d'Albert, Duke of Luynes
25. Anne de Rodulf
6. Louis Charles d'Albert, Duke of Luynes
26. Hercule de Rohan, Duke of Montbazon =14
13. Marie de Rohan, Mademoiselle de Montbazon
27. Madeleine de Lenoncourt, Dame de Coupvray
3. Jeanne Baptiste d'Albert de Luynes
28. Louis de Rohan, Prince of Guéméné, Count of Montbazon
14. Hercule de Rohan, Duke of Montbazon
29. Eleonore de Rohan, Dame du Verger, Countess of Rochefort
7. Anne de Rohan
30. Claude de Bretagne, Count of Vertus
15. Marie de Bretagne d'Avaugour
31. Catherine Fouquet de La Varenne
