= Maria Vittoria of Savoy =

Maria Vittoria di Savoia
- Princess of Carignano; Marchesa di Susa
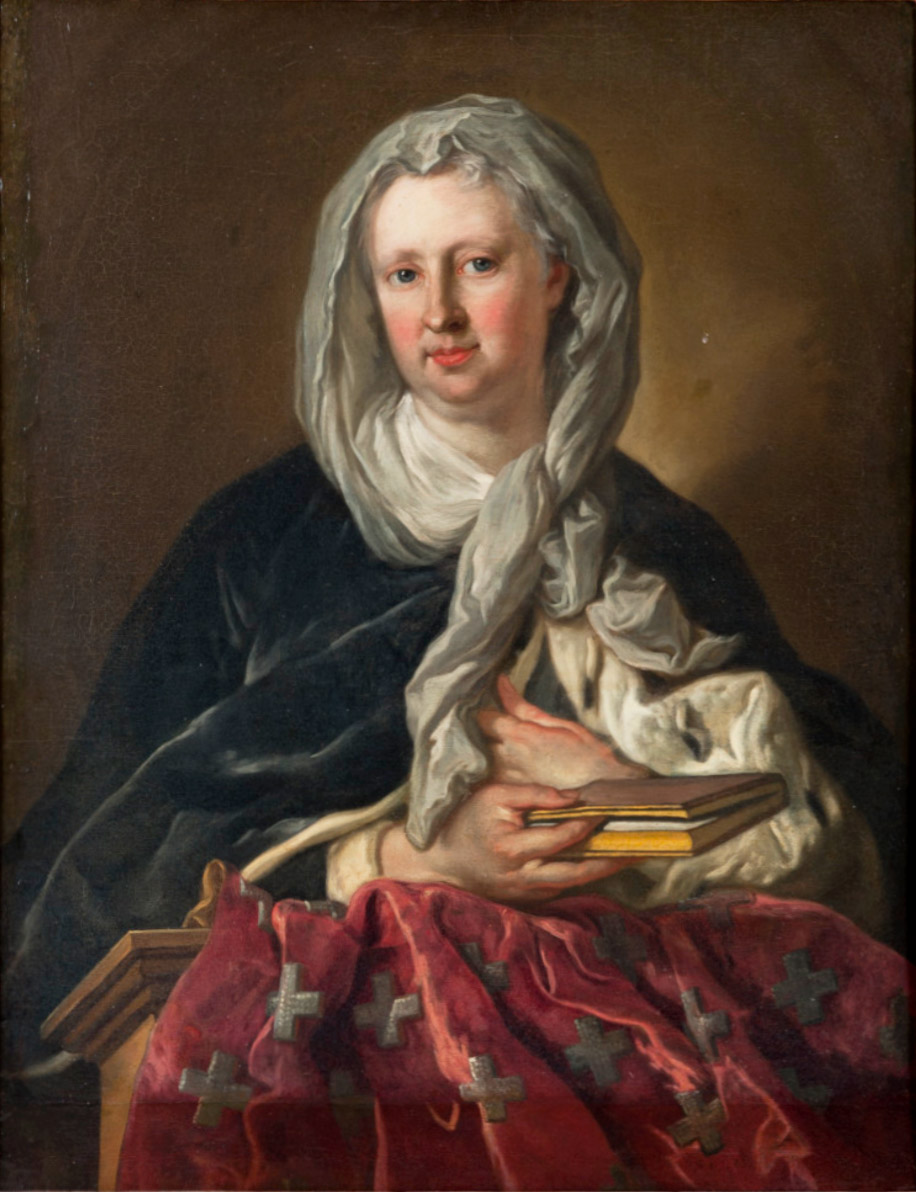
- Born: 9 February 1690; Turin, Savoy
- Died: 8 July 1766 (aged 76); Paris, France
- Spouse: Victor Amadeus I, Prince of Carignano (m. 1714; died 1741)
- Issue Detail: Louis Victor, Prince of Carignan; Anna Teresa, Princess of Soubise
Names
- Maria Vittoria Francesca di Savoia
- House: Savoy
- Father: Victor Amadeus II of Sardinia
- Mother: Jeanne Baptiste d'Albert de Luynes

Maria Vittoria of Savoy (Maria Vittoria Francesca; 9 February 1690 – 8 July 1766) was a legitimated daughter of Victor Amadeus II of Sardinia, first king of the House of Savoy. Married to the head of a cadet branch of the House of Savoy, she is an ancestress of the kings of Sardinia and of the Savoy kings of Italy.

== Early life ==
Maria Vittoria Francesca di Savoia was the child of Victor Amadeus II of Sardinia and his maîtresse-en-titre, Jeanne Baptiste d'Albert de Luynes. Born in Turin on 9 February 1690 while her father was reigning Duke of Savoy, her parents' affair had begun in early 1689. Daughter of a French duke of distinguished ancestry and wife of a prominent Savoyard nobleman, initially she sought to avoid becoming a mistress of Victor Amadeus, then reigning Duke of Savoy. But ambition prompted her husband's family and even the Duke's wife, Anne Marie d'Orléans, to encourage the liaison.

Her mother's popularity made her unpopular at the Savoyard court. Maria Vittoria's father, jealous and obsessed with Jeanne Baptiste, eventually had her shut up from view of the court. Jeanne Baptiste decided to flee Savoy in 1700 and sought refuge in France from Louis XIV.

When her mother fled Savoy in 1700, Maria Vittoria and her brother, Vittorio Francesco di Savoia, remained in the duchy under the care of their father.

Her father legitimated Maria Vittoria and her brother Vittorio Francesco, making him the Marchese di Susa (he died childless in 1762, aged 68) and granting her the feminine version of that title, Marchesa di Susa.

== Marriage ==
In 1713 Victor Emmanuel acquired royal dignity, becoming King of Sicily (although he would be compelled to exchange that realm for Sardinia by the European Powers in 1720, while retaining the title of king). Betrothed in mid-1714 in an arrangement which imitated Louis XIV's practice of marrying his legitimated offspring to his royal kinsmen, the princes du sang, Maria Vittoria married Victor Amadeus of Savoy, Prince of Carignan at the Castle of Moncalieri on 7 November, aged 23. Her father gave her husband an annual income of 400,000 livres, partly to assuage injury to the princely dignity of the Carignans for acquiescing to a marital alliance with a lady born out of wedlock.

Her father was fond of Prince Victor Amadeus but in 1717, her husband was found to be deeply in debt and lost the King's favour. As a result, Maria Vittoria's husband fled to France in July 1718 during the Regency of Philippe II, Duke of Orléans, travelling as the Conte di Bosco. Soon after, Maria Vittoria followed.

== France ==
The couple settled in Paris at the court of the infant Louis XV, who lived at the Tuileries Palace. Her husband was created Intendant des Ménus Plaisirs – a sort of Master of Ceremonies by the Regent. The couple lived at the Hôtel de Soissons, which they claimed in right of the Savoy-Soissons inheritance which had been confiscated when Savoy became an enemy of France under Louis XIV during the War of the Spanish Succession. Maria Vittoria and her husband led a scandalous life at the Hôtel de Soissons, turning it into one of the most dangerous for gambling in the capital.

Maria Vittoria eventually developed a close relationship with Cardinal Fleury, "She pretends to be devout and makes money out of the transactions of the court through the Cardinal, with whom she is on good terms." She also became an intimate of Louis Henri, Duke of Bourbon, Louis XV's prime minister after the death of Phillipe d'Orléans.

Her husband's position and their connections at the French court were important to their circumstances, as Prince Victor Amadeus proceeded to incur massive debts in France, adding to those already contracted in Savoy.

Maria Vittoria is alleged to have intrigued with the Duke of Bourbon, reporting all to her father back in Savoy, effectively acting as a spy. She also reported attempts of Queen Marie Leszczyńska to influence Louis XV politically – which involved the Duke of Bourbon's trying to dispose of Fleury, a move which ended very badly for the duke. However, Maria Vittoria is alleged to have remained loyal to Fleury: When the Duke of Bourbon suggested, via an intermediary, that if she could mend the relationship between himself and the Cardinal her husband's huge debts in both France and Savoy would be settled and an income of half a million livres would be assured her, she is said to have indignantly refused.

The Queen is said to have sought Maria Vittoria's advice as to how to reconcile with the King when he took offence at her attempts to interfere in his relations with Fleury. She advised the queen to henceforth discontinue all involvement in politics and act only as a role model for the consort of the Most Christian King of France, and advise queen Marie followed. Nonetheless, Maria Vittoria never became very intimate with the Queen; in 1726 she and Fleury speculated about who would replace Marie if she should die in childbirth.

Maria Vittoria saw her son marry Landgravine Christine of Hesse-Rotenburg, whose sister Caroline of Hesse had married the disgraced Duke of Bourbon in 1728, in 1740.

== Later life ==
Her husband died at the Hôtel de Soissons in April 1740 heavily in debt; she lived quietly as a widow but successfully managed to marry her only surviving daughter, Princess Anna Teresa of Savoy-Carignan, to the widowed Charles de Rohan, Prince of Soubise. Anna Teresa had one child; Victoire de Rohan, who would become the official governess of Louis XVI's daughter, Marie Thérèse of France.

In 1763 Leopold Mozart wrote in a letter that "today my little girl was given a small, transparent snuff-box, inlaid with gold, from the Princess Carignan, and Wolfgang a pocket writing case in silver, with silver pens with which to write his compositions; it is so small and exquisitely worked that it is impossible to describe it".

Maria Vittoria of Savoy-Carignan died in Paris on 8 July 1766 aged 76. She was the paternal grandmother of the Princesse de Lamballe, tragic friend of Marie Antoinette.

== Issue ==
- Prince Joseph Victor Amadeus of Savoy (1716–1716)
- Princess Anna Teresa of Savoy (Turin, 1 November 1717 – Paris, 5 April 1745) married Charles de Rohan, Prince of Soubise and had issue;
- Prince Louis Victor of Savoy, Prince of Carignan (Paris, 25 September 1721 – Turin, 16 December 1778)
- Prince Victor Amadeus of Savoy (1722)
- A stillborn daughter (1729)

== Ancestry ==
Ancestors of Maria Vittoria of Savoy

16. Charles Emmanuel I, Duke of Savoy
8. Victor Amadeus I, Duke of Savoy
17. Infanta Catalina Micaela of Spain
4. Charles Emmanuel II, Duke of Savoy
18. Henry IV of France
9. Christine of France
19. Marie de' Medici
2. Victor Amadeus II of Sardinia
20. Henri of Savoy, Duke de Nemours
10. Charles Amadeus of Savoy, Duke de Nemours
21. Princess Anne of Lorraine
5. Marie Jeanne of Savoy
22. Henry IV of France
11. Élisabeth de Bourbon
23. Gabrielle d'Estrées
1. Maria Vittoria di Savoia
24. Honoré d'Albert, Seigneur de Luynes
12. Charles d'Albert, Duke de Luynes
25. Anne de Rodulf
6. Louis Charles d'Albert, Duke de Luynes
26. Hercule de Rohan, Duke de Montbazon =14
13. Marie de Rohan, Mademoiselle de Montbazon
27. Madeleine de Lenoncourt, Dame de Coupvray
3. Jeanne Baptiste d'Albert de Luynes
28. Louis de Rohan, Prince de Guéméné
14. Hercule de Rohan, Duke de Montbazon
29. Eleonore de Rohan
7. Anne de Rohan
30. Claude de Bretagne, Count de Vertus
15. Marie de Bretagne d'Avaugour
31. Catherine Fouquet de La Varenne
