= Siege of Villafranca (1744) =

1744 battle

- Part of the War of the Austrian Succession
Date	14 – 27 April 1744
Location	Villafranca Marittima, Kingdom of Sardinia (present-day France)
Result	Franco-Spanish victory

Belligerents
Kingdom of Spain; Kingdom of France	Kingdom of Sardinia; Great Britain

Commanders and leaders
(Spain) Infante Philip (Kingdom of France) Prince of Conti	(Kingdom of Sardinia) Vittorio Francesco Filippo of Savoy (POW) (Kingdom of Great Britain) Thomas Mathews

Strength
30,000	8,000

Casualties and losses
2,820 casualties	1,500 dead or wounded 1,830 captured

The siege of Villafranca took place between 14 and 27 April 1744, during the War of the Austrian Succession. The armies of Spain and France advancing towards the Kingdom of Sardinia and attacked the entrenched positions in the Villafranca pass, defended by Anglo-Sardinian forces. The Franco-Spanish attacks were not very successful, but the defenders, due to the high losses suffered during the attacks, were forced to abandon the port of Villafranca with a large part of their forces. The small garrison that remained in the place surrendered on 27 April.

== Situation in Italy ==
1744 had opened bleakly for the Spaniards in Italy. To the south the Austrians were steadily driving back General Gages's army. Naples was threatened. Britain, boasting naval superiority in the Mediterranean, intervened on the side of Austria, and the Royal Navy everywhere harassed Spain's allies and frustrated Spanish war shipping. Genoa was blocked off by a British squadron, and Switzerland kept her borders closed to the passage of troops. Marching overland through allied France, the Infante Philip had easily conquered Savoy, but, starved of supplies, had been unable to advance against the Sardinians in the Alps.

On 22 February, the Bourbon navies defeated the British off the coast of Toulon. The retreat of Admiral Matthews' fleet left the sea lanes temporarily under French and Spanish control. Supplies poured into Philip's camp. 20,000 Frenchmen under Louis François I, Prince of Conti were then dispatched to combine with Philip's 20,000 Spaniards, their goal being to force a passage into Lombardy and to unite with the Spanish army in the south.

On 1 April, the allies crossed the Var and advanced into Nice, which fell without a fight. Villafranca lay before them.

== Siege ==
The Sardinians led by Vittorio Francesco Filippo di Savoia, Marquis of Susa, the brother of the King Charles Emmanuel III, entrenched themselves along the heights of Villafranca. Their natural defences were formidable: the attackers, hemmed in by cliffs and precipices, faced a difficult climb up over rocks and boulders, in plain sight of Sardinian guns. The fortified camp was equipped with more than 80 guns of all calibres, landed from English ships stationed in the harbor, which were arranged in eleven batteries. Sardinian forces counted fourteen battalions of infantry.

Admiral Matthews, meanwhile, had returned to the area and landed a contingent of British regulars, marines, and artillery specialists to bolster the Sardinian defence. This force joined the Sardinians on the heights, their guns bearing down on the French against whom they had only recently declared war (Britain had been fighting a war against Spain since 1739). Voltaire would later quip, "even in the Alps we could still find Englishmen to fight us."

Conti's first attack was launched the 14 April, but was suspended because of a storm. Finally Conti gave the assault on the fortified camp of Villafranca on the night of 19 to 20 April 1744. In the early stages of the battle the French and the Spaniards were able to immediately gain the position of the collet de Villefranche, capturing or destroying five Sardinian battalions. Even the commander in chief, the Marquis of Susa, was taken prisoner and he had to be replaced by the Knight of Cinzano. The French and Spanish forces moved to conquer the positions of Mont Gros, Mont Rouge and Mont Leuze, the keys of the defensive perimeter of Villafranca. However, led by their new commander, the defenders were able to contain the attack. In particular, the regiment Kalbermatten, a Swiss unit in Sardinian service, was able to develop a magnificent defensive action to hold the position of Mont Leuze. At four in the afternoon the situation was restored and Conti had now exhausted all the forces at his disposal. The Cinzano had the opportunity to launch an assault on the collective Villefranche and reoccupy the position, which is crucial as it allowed the transit of the road to Nice. This operation, conducted by principally by companies of grenadiers, achieved a complete success. In the evening the Sardinians were again deployed on the positions of the morning.

The defenders had suffered heavy losses. There were over 1,000 dead and wounded and 1,500 prisoners, compared to less than 3,000 losses of Spaniards and French, who counted among their ranks 433 men held captive. With only 5,000 men fit to fight, Cinzano preferred to abandon the fortified camp of Villafranca with the help of the British navy. On the evening of 21 April, in the dock of Villafranca, the garrison was shipped aboard 33 ships escorted by four British warships. At the dawn of the 22 April the fleet left the port. The fort of Montalbano had been abandoned, but Cinzano had left a garrison of 340 soldiers in the Citadel of Villafranca, who surrendered on April 27.

== Aftermath ==
The Prince de Conti realized that the conquest of the Ligurian Riviera would cost several months of combat. He then preferred to attack the Alps in July, an action that allowed the breakthrough of the Italian front and the siege of the city of Cuneo.
