= Jeanne Baptiste d'Albert de Luynes =

French noblewoman (1670–1736)

Jeanne Baptiste
- Countess of Verua
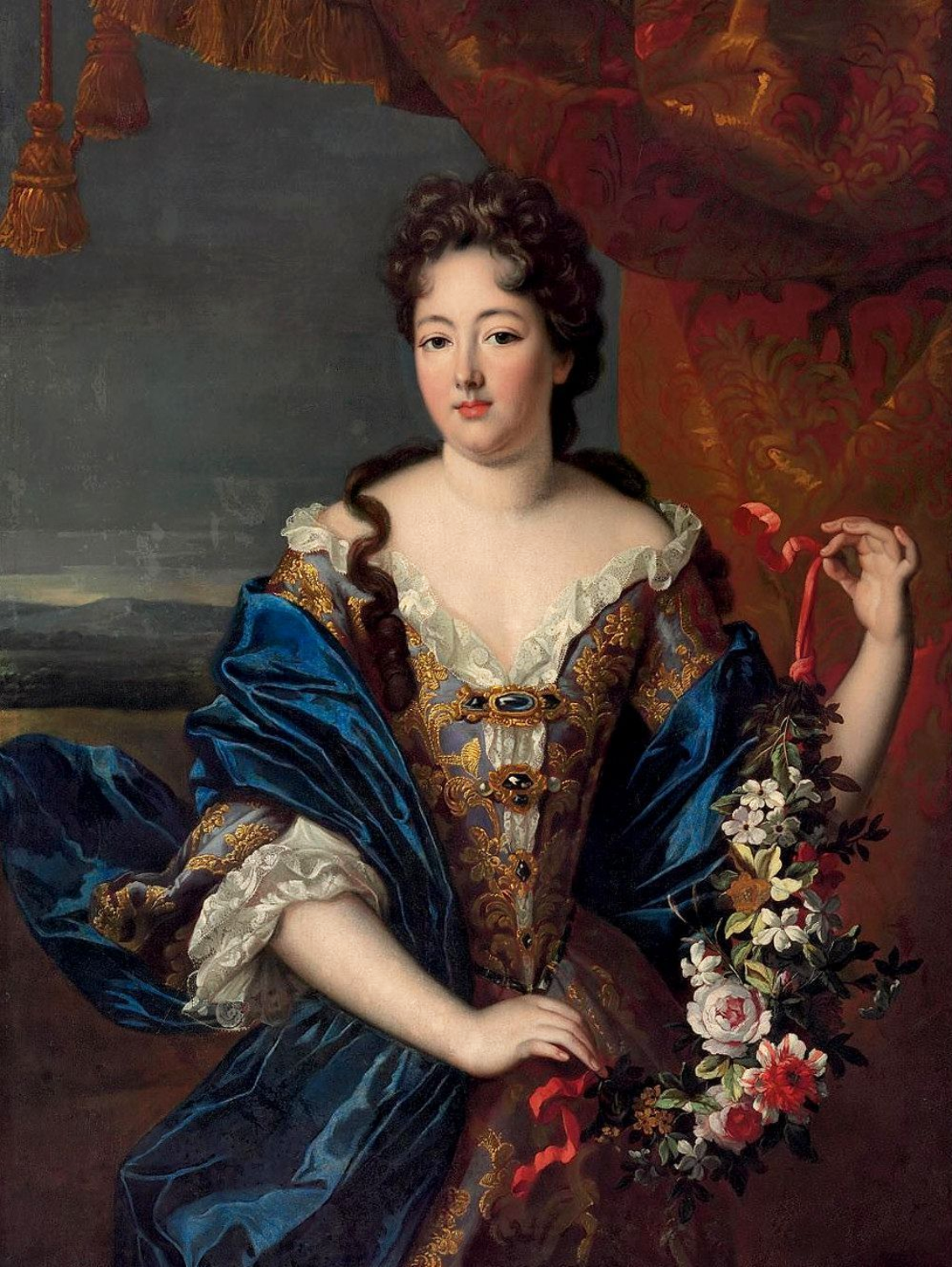
- Full name: Jeanne Baptiste d'Albert de Luynes
- Born: 18 January 1670; Hôtel de Luynes, Paris, France
- Died: 18 November 1736 (aged 66); Paris, France
- Noble family: House of Scaglia; House of Albert
- Spouses: Giuseppe Ignazio Scaglia, Conte di Verua (m. 1683; died 1704)
- Issue Detail: Maria Vittoria, Princess of Carignan; Vittorio Francesco, Marquis of Susa
- Father: Louis Charles d'Albert de Luynes
- Mother: Anne de Rohan

Jeanne Baptiste d'Albert de Luynes, comtesse de Verrue (French pronunciation: [ʒan batist dalbɛʁ də lɥin]; 18 January 1670 – 18 November 1736) was a French noblewoman and the mistress of Victor Amadeus II of Sardinia.

== Biography ==
The daughter of Louis Charles d'Albert, Duke of Luynes (1620–1690) and his second wife (and aunt) Princess Anne de Rohan-Montbazon (1644–1684, daughter of Hercule, Duke of Montbazon), she had five full siblings. She was the granddaughter of Marie de Rohan. Her older half-brother was Charles Honoré d'Albert de Luynes, a private advisor to Louis XIV and the builder of the infamous Château de Dampierre. Born at the Hôtel de Luynes in Paris, she was baptised at the Église Saint-Eustache. She was named after her godfather Jean-Baptiste Colbert.

After an education at the prestigious Abbey of Port-Royal in Paris, she was married to Joseph Ignace Scaglia, (Note: His full name was Augusto Manfredo Giuseppe Ieronimo Ignazio Scaglia, Conte di Verrua.) Count of Verrua, (Note: Verua was Verrue in France.) between 23 August and 25 August 1683. She was thirteen and a half years old at the time of her marriage. Her husband was a colonel de dragons and a prominent Piedmontese diplomat working for the Duke of Savoy.

Jeanne Baptiste and her husband had four children. Her husband was, "young, handsome, rich, and honest". His mother was a lady-in-waiting to the French-born Duchess of Savoy, Anne Marie d'Orléans.

At the Savoyard capital of Turin, the Duke of Savoy became infatuated with the young countess and by 1688 he had fallen deeply in love with her. The piously brought up countess, at first, ignored the advances of the duke who would see her in attendance on his wife, Anne Marie. Later on, the duchess and her uncle, the French king Louis XIV, "encouraged" Madame de Verrue to take advantage of the Duke of Savoy's advances. In 1689, Jeanne Baptiste gave in to the duke's overtures. The lovers became the parents of two children. The future Princess of Carignan was born in 1690. A son, Vittorio Francesco, was born in 1694 and was later given the title Marquis of Susa.

The most envied woman at the Savoyard court due to her influence over the duke, Jeanne Baptiste tried to dabble in politics. With the help of the maréchal de Tessé, she encouraged the marriage of the duke's eldest daughter, Princess Maria Adelaide, with Louis XIV's grandson, the Duke of Burgundy.

She also helped her brother's escape to France due to his heavy debts in October 1700. He took refuge with their aunt in Paris.

Jeanne Baptiste was widowed in 1704, her husband dying on 13 August in the Battle of Blenheim.

Saint-Simon writing about her in the Regency of Philippe d'Orléans said the following on Madame de Verrue:

M. de Savoie often met Madame de Verrue, and soon found her much to his taste. She saw this, and said so to her husband and her mother-in-law. They praised her, but took no further notice of the matter. M. de Savoie redoubled his attentions, and, contrary to his usual custom, gave fetes, which the Madame de Verrue felt were for her. She did all she could not to attend them, but her mother-in-law quarrelled with her, said she wished to play the important, and that it was her vanity which gave her these ideas. Her husband, more gentle, desired her to attend these fetes, saying that even if M. de Savoie were really in love with her, it would not do to fail in anything towards him. Soon after M. de Savoie spoke to the Madame de Verrue. She told her husband and her mother-in-law, and used every entreaty in order to prevail upon them to let her go and pass some time in the country. They would not listen to her, and seeing no other course open, she feigned to be ill, and had herself sent to the waters of Bourbon. She wrote to her father, the Duc de Luynes, to meet her there, and set out under the charge of the Abbé de Verrue, uncle of her husband. As soon as the Duke of Luynes arrived at Bourbon, and became acquainted with the danger which threatened his daughter; he conferred with the Abbé as to the best course to adopt, and agreed with him that Madame should remain away from Turin some time, in order that M. de Savoie might get cured of his passion. M. de Luynes little thought that he had conferred with a wolf who wished to carry off his lamb. The Abbé de Verrue, it seems, was himself violently in love with Madame de Verrue, and directly her father had gone declared the state of his heart. Finding himself only repulsed, the miserable old man turned his love into hate, ill-treated Madame de Verrue, and upon her return to Turin, lost no opportunity of injuring her in the eyes of her husband and her mother-in-law.

He goes on:

"Madame de Verrue suffered this for some time, but at last her virtue yielded to the bad treatment she received. She listened to the Duke of Savoy, and delivered herself up to him in order to free herself from persecution. Is not this a real romance? But it happened in our time, under the eyes and to the knowledge of everybody."

"When the truth became known, the Verrues were in despair, although they had only themselves to blame for what had happened. Soon the new mistress ruled all the Court of Savoie, whose sovereign was at her feet as before a goddess. She disposed of the favours of her lover, and was feared and courted by the ministry. Her haughtiness made her hated; she was poisoned; M. de Savoie gave her a subtle antidote, which fortunately cured her, and without injury to her beauty. Her reign lasted. After a while she had the small-pox. M. de Savoie tended her during this illness, as though he had been a nurse; and although her face suffered a little by it, he loved her not the less. But he loved her after his own fashion. He kept her shut up from view, and at last she grew so tired of her restraint that she was determined to fly. She conferred with her [youngest] brother, the Chevalier de Luynes, who served with much distinction in the navy, and together they arranged the matter."

"They seized an opportunity when M. de Savoie had gone on a tour to Chambéry, and departed furtively. Crossing our frontier, they arrived in Paris, where Madame de Verrue, who had grown very rich, took a house, and by degrees succeeded in getting people to come and see her, though, at first, owing to the scandal of her life, this was difficult. In the end, her opulence gained her a large number of friends, and she availed herself so well of her opportunities, that she became of much importance, and influenced strongly the government. But that time goes beyond my memoirs. She left in Turin a son and a daughter, both recognised by M. de Savoie, after the manner of our King. He loved passionately these illegitimate children, and married the daughter to the Prince of Carignan."

She returned to Paris in 1700 without her two children, Maria Vittoria Francesca and Vittorio Francesco, but with a considerable fortune.

When Jeanne Baptiste was allegedly poisoned, it was the famous Madame de Ventadour who helped to cure the ill countess. Madame de Ventadour went on to be the saviour of the infant Duke of Brittany, the future Louis XV, whose parents the Duke and Duchess of Burgundy (Note: The couple had become the Dauphin and Dauphine of France at the death of le Grand Dauphin in April 1711.) died from measles within a week of each other in February 1712. Madame de Ventadour would be devoted to the future Louis XV.

After living as a recluse for more than three years at the request of her husband, "the eccentric countess reappeared in the world [with] her 'ésprit' as well as Jean-Baptiste Glucq," said Saint-Simon, who went on to say that the two secretly married. This, however, has never been proven. Every year, when the court was at Fontainebleau, she would stay at Glucq's residence at the Château de Sainte-Assise at Seine-Port. Later on, she stayed at the Château de Condé at Condé-en-Brie with another intimate, the marquis de La Faye.

During her time in France, she was well known at court. Jeanne Baptiste was a good friend of Monsieur le Duc, future Prime minister of France, and his mother Madame la Duchesse Douairière who was her age. Madame la Duchesse was the eldest surviving illegitimate daughter of Louis XIV and Madame de Montespan.

A great letter writer, Jeanne Baptiste was interested in art, science and even kept in contact with the budding Voltaire and other philosophers. In Paris, she installed the numerous gifts she received when in Turin, at the Hôtel d'Hauterive – destroyed since then by the creation of the Boulevard Raspail – which she enlarged to house her already large collection of objets d'art. She even bought the neighbouring property owned by the Discalced Carmelites in order to help house her relations.

Jeanne Baptiste had her own salon in Paris, which was attended by the Abbé Terrasson, Rothelin, the Garde des sceaux de France, Chauvelin, Jean-Baptiste de Montullé, the marquis de Lassay and his son Léon de Madaillan de Lesparre, Count of Lassay, (Note: Madame la Duchesse douairière was his future mistress. The Palais Bourbon, built by Madame la Duchesse, was built next to the Hôtel de Lassay. The two buildings are now the home of the French National Assembly.) and many others that came to live close to her home.

During the Regency, she increased her fortune greatly thanks to the Système de Law, the brainchild of John Law, a Scottish economist who was a protégé of the Regent of France. With her larger fortune, she ordered the construction of two town residences to be constructed by the architect Victor Dailly. Out of the two, one remains and can be seen at 1 Rue du Regard. That was the place where the Conseil de guerre was housed and had connections with Alfred Dreyfus. It was demolished in 1894. The hôtel de Verrue was never inhabited by Jeanne Baptiste. She instead lived at number 8 Rue d'Assas near the Palais du Luxembourg. The hôtel de Verrue was built in 1740. She also lived at the hôtel d'Aubeterre where she enlarged its gallery to better show her famous collection. That gallery was painted by Claude Audran and can be seen today at the Musée des Arts décoratifs in Paris.

Jeanne Baptiste died in Paris at the age of 66. Very generous in her will, she even left things for her birds which lived in a lavish aviary. Her epitaph went as follows:

Ci-git, dans une paix profonde, Cette Dame de Volupté, Qui, pour plus de sûreté, Fit son paradis dans ce monde

Here lies, in deep peace, That lady of delight, Who, as an extra precaution Made her paradise in this world

== Her collection ==
The collection of Madame de Verrue was renowned for its paintings of old masters, objets d'art and numerous pieces of expensive furniture. She actively increased it through additional purchases, including jewellery, precious stones (more than 8000), tapestries and clothes.

She also had a great interest in architecture and buildings in general. On 12 July 1713 she acquired a house in the town of Meudon, near the old seat of le grand Dauphin. On the 27th of the same month, she ordered the reconstruction of that building by Pierre-Nicolas Delespine, using plans by Jean Baptiste Alexandre Le Blond. She commissioned paintings by Lancret, Alexis Grimou, and possessed paintings by David Teniers the Younger and Antoine Watteau. She even owned a Portrait of Charles I of England by Van Dyke.

In addition to a dazzling collection of art, she was one of the greatest bibliophiles of her time. She kept her books in a large room furnished with Boulle pieces and overlooking the garden. She possessed around 18,000 volumes (in Paris and her house at Meudon). This vast private library was sadly dispersed in 1737. Only 3,000 of them remained together.

Her daughter married in 1714 to the Prince of Carignan. The couple had five children and through them, Jeanne Baptiste was an ancestor of the murdered princesse de Lamballe, the present Prince Napoléon, the Kings of Sardinia (since 1831), the Kings of Italy (since 1861) and the Prince of Naples.

== Portrayals ==
- Dumas. Alexandre, 1863, La Dame de Volupté; Mémoires de Jeanne d'Albert de Luynes, Comtesse de Verrue, Paris.
- La Putain du roi (The King's whore) a 1990 film by Axel Corti; portrayed by Valeria Golino.

== Issue ==
With her husband, Jeanne Baptiste had four children:

- Anna Maria Angelica Scaglia (1684 – 1745), abbess.
- Vittorio Amedeo Scaglia (1686 – 1707).
- Maria Anna Scaglia (1687 – 1745), abbess.
- Carlo Augusto Scaglia (1688 – 1706).

With Victor Amadeus II, Jeanne Baptiste had two children:

- Maria Vittoria Francesca of Savoy (1690 – 1766), Marchioness of Susa; married Victor Amadeus, Prince of Carignan on 7 November 1714.
- Vittorio Francesco Filippo of Savoy (1694 - 1762), Marquis of Susa; married Maria Lucrezia Franchi di Pont but had no issue.

== Bibliography ==
- Virginie Spenlé: Torino – Parigi – Dresda. Le collezioni Verrua e Carignano nella Pinacoteca di Dresda, in: Le raccolte del principe Eugenio condottiero e intellettuale, Milano/Torino: Silvana Editoriale / La Veneria Reale 2012, S. 144–157, ISBN 978-8-83-662335-8
- Lawrence, Cynthia, and Kasman, Magdalene (1997). "Jeanne Baptiste d'Albert de Luynes, comtesse de Verrue (1670–1736): An Art Collector in Eighteenth-Century Paris". In Lawrence, Cynthia (ed.). Women and Art in Early Modern Europe: Patrons, Collectors, and Connoisseurs. University Park. Pennsylvania: Pennsylvania State University Press. pp. 207–226. ISBN 0271015683. OCLC 1195484224
- G. de Léris, La comtesse de Verrue
- Béatrice Mairé, Les livres de la comtesse de Verrue à Meudon ou les péripéties d'une bibliothèque de campagne, in : La Reliure n° spécial de la Revue de la Bibliothèque nationale de France, 12 janvier 2003, pp. 47–52
- La Contessa, autobiographie imaginaire de la Comtesse de Verrue, par André Gilbertas, Atelier Comp’Act, 2004.
- Rochelle Ziskin, Sheltering art : collecting and social identity in early eighteenth-century Paris. University Park, Pa.: Pennsylvania State University Press, 2012
- Dušan Vasić, "The Verrue Sale Manuscript(s)", 2021, researchers.one
