= Victor Amadeus II =

Ruler of the Savoyard state from 1675 to 1730

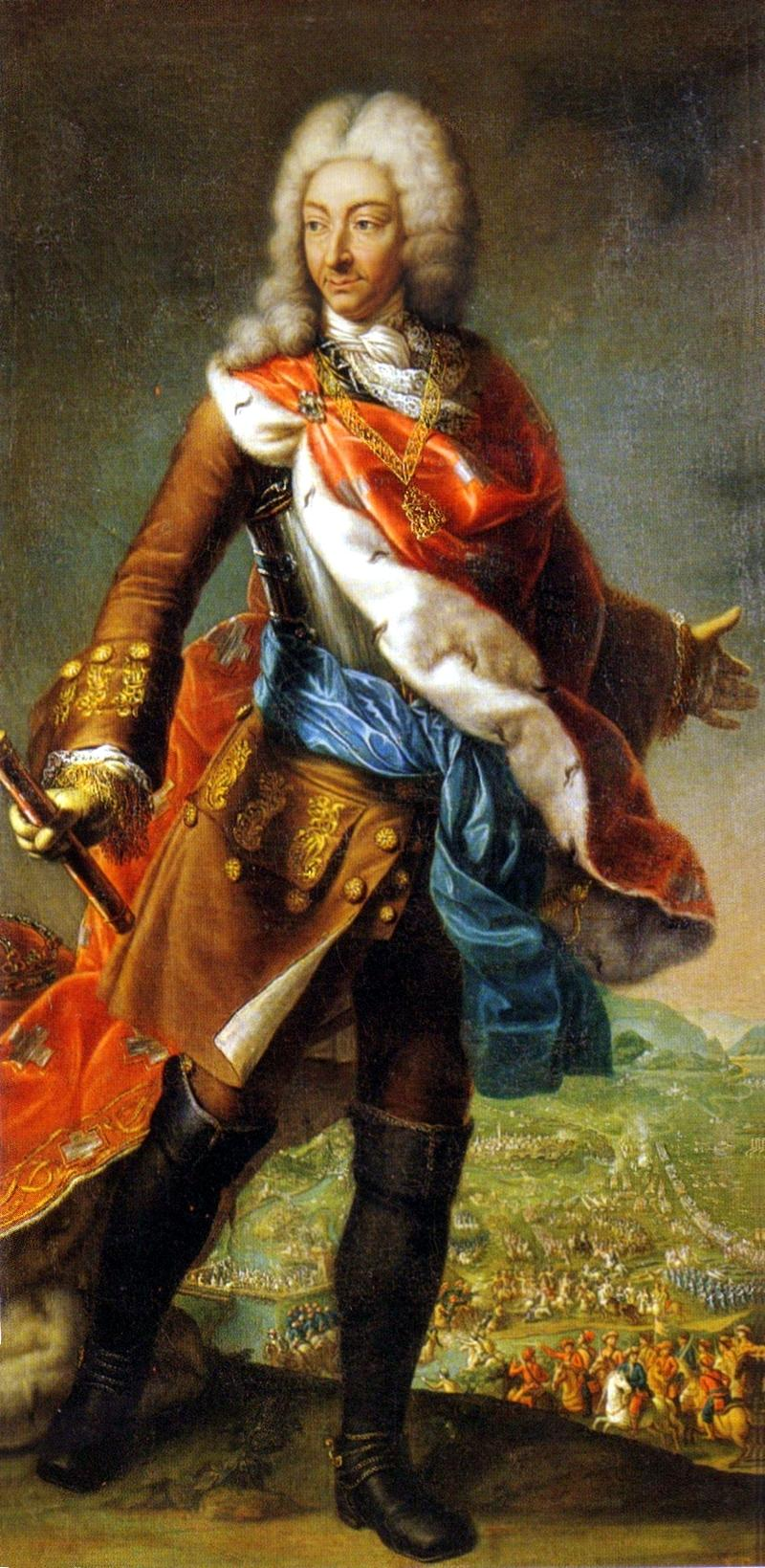

King of Sardinia
- Reign: 17 February 1720 – 3 September 1730
- Predecessor: Charles VI, Holy Roman Emperor
- Successor: Charles Emmanuel III

King of Sicily
- Reign: 22 September 1713 – 17 February 1720
- Coronation: 24 December 1713
- Predecessor: Philip IV
- Successor: Charles VI

Duke of Savoy
- Reign: 12 June 1675 – 3 September 1730
- Predecessor: Charles Emmanuel II
- Successor: Charles Emmanuel III
- Regent: Marie Jeanne (1675–1684)
- Born: 14 May 1666; Royal Palace of Turin, Savoy
- Died: 31 October 1732 (aged 66); Castle of Rivoli, Turin, Savoy
- Burial: Basilica of Superga, Turin, Italy
- Spouses: Anne Marie d'Orléans (m. 1684; died 1728) Anna Canalis di Cumiana (m. 1730)
- Issue Detail: Maria Adélaïde, Dauphine of France; Maria Luisa, Queen of Spain; Victor Amadeus, Prince of Piedmont; Charles Emmanuel III, King of Sardinia; Illegitimate: Maria Vittoria, Princess of Carignano; Vittorio Francesco, Marquis of Susa
Names
- Italian: Vittorio Amedeo Francesco di Savoia
- House: Savoy
- Father: Charles Emmanuel II, Duke of Savoy
- Mother: Marie Jeanne Baptiste of Nemours
- Religion: Catholic Church
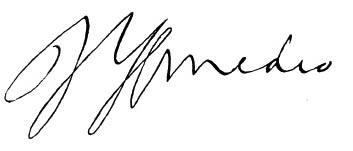
- Signature

Victor Amadeus II (Italian: Vittorio Amedeo Francesco, Arpitan: Victor-Amèdê, French: Victor-Amédée; 14 May 1666 – 31 October 1732) was the head of the House of Savoy and ruler of the Savoyard states from 12 June 1675 until his abdication in 1730. He was the first of his house to acquire a royal crown, ruling first as King of Sicily (1713–1720) and then as King of Sardinia (1720–1730). Among his other titles were Duke of Savoy, Duke of Montferrat, Prince of Piedmont, Marquis of Saluzzo and Duke of Aosta, Maurienne and Nice.

Louis XIV arranged his marriage in order to maintain French influence in Savoy, but Victor Amadeus soon broke away from the influence of France. At his father's death in 1675, his mother, Marie Jeanne Baptiste of Nemours, was regent in the name of her nine-year-old son and would remain in de facto power until 1684 when Victor Amadeus banished her further involvement in the state. Having fought in the War of the Spanish Succession, he was rewarded with the Kingdom of Sicily in 1713, but he was forced to exchange this title for the poorer Kingdom of Sardinia in 1720.

Reigning for over 55 years, he is the longest-reigning monarch in Savoyard history, surpassing Charles Emmanuel I. Victor Amadeus left a considerable cultural influence in Turin, remodeling the Royal Palace of Turin, Palace of Venaria, Palazzina di caccia of Stupinigi, as well as building the Basilica of Superga where he rests.

== Infancy and regency ==
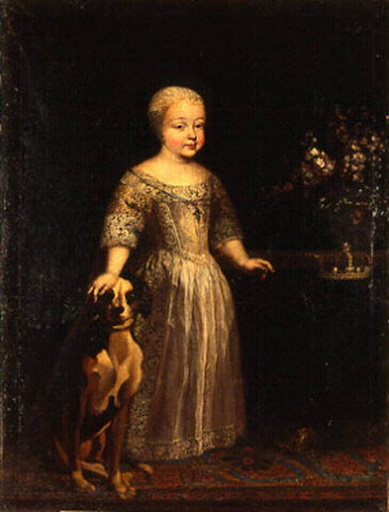
Victor Amadeus by Jacob Ferdinand Voet c. 1673

Victor Amadeus was born in Turin to Charles Emmanuel II, Duke of Savoy, and his second wife Marie Jeanne Baptiste of Nemours. Named after his paternal grandfather Victor Amadeus I, Duke of Savoy he was their only child. As an infant he was styled as the Prince of Piedmont, traditional title of the heir apparent to the duchy of Savoy. A weak child, his health was greatly monitored. As an infant he had a passion for soldiers and was noted as being very intelligent.

His father died in June 1675 in Turin at the age of forty after a series of convulsive fevers. His mother was declared Regent of Savoy and, known as Madame Royale at court, took power. In 1677, during her regency, she tried to arrange a marriage between Victor Amadeus and his first cousin Infanta Isabel Luísa of Portugal, the presumptive heiress of her father, Peter II and Victor Amadeus' aunt. His mother urged him to agree to the marriage, as this would have left Marie Jeanne permanently in control of the Duchy of Savoy as Regent because her son would have had to live in Portugal with his new wife. The duchy would then revert to the Kingdom of Portugal at her death. Victor Amadeus refused, and a party was even formed which refused to recognise his leaving Savoy. Despite a marriage contract being signed between Portugal and Savoy on 15 May 1679, the marriage between Victor Amadeus and the Infanta came to nothing and was thus cancelled.

Other candidates included Maria Antonia of Austria, Countess Palatine of Neuburg and Anna Maria Luisa de' Medici. Victor Amadeus was keen on the match with Tuscany and negotiations were kept secret from France even though the match never happened. Under the influence of Louis XIV and Marie Jeanne, Victor Amadeus was forced to marry a French princess Anne Marie d'Orléans. His mother was keen on the match and had always promoted French interests having been born in Paris a member of a cadet branch of the House of Savoy. He asked for Anne Marie's hand in March 1684, Victor Amadeus, who had been using political allies to gain support to end his mother's grip on power, succeeded in 1684 when she was banished from further influence in the state.

=== Salt wars ===
A significant event of his mother's regency was the Salt Wars of 1680. These rebellions were caused by the unpopular taxes on salt in all cities in Savoy. The system had been put in place by Emmanuel Philibert, Duke of Savoy to raise money for the crown. The annual payment of a tax which had been in place for over 100 years caused great discontent and rebellion finally broke out in Mondovì, where the people refused to pay taxes to the emissary of Savoy, Andrea Cantatore di Breo. The unrest caused an army to be sent to stop the unrest in the town, which was pacified quickly. However, in the town of Montaldo, the unrest began again and was more serious than before. 200 soldiers were killed in warfare which lasted for several days.

The news of these rebellions soon reached a wider scope and it became clear that soon the whole of Piedmont was on the verge of revolt. Power at this point still being with Victor Amadeus' mother, she ordered representatives of the town of Mondovì to go to Turin to conclude treaties and were cordially welcomed by the young Victor Amadeus, who agreed to the treaties. The event had allowed Victor Amadeus a chance to exert some power.

== Duke of Savoy ==
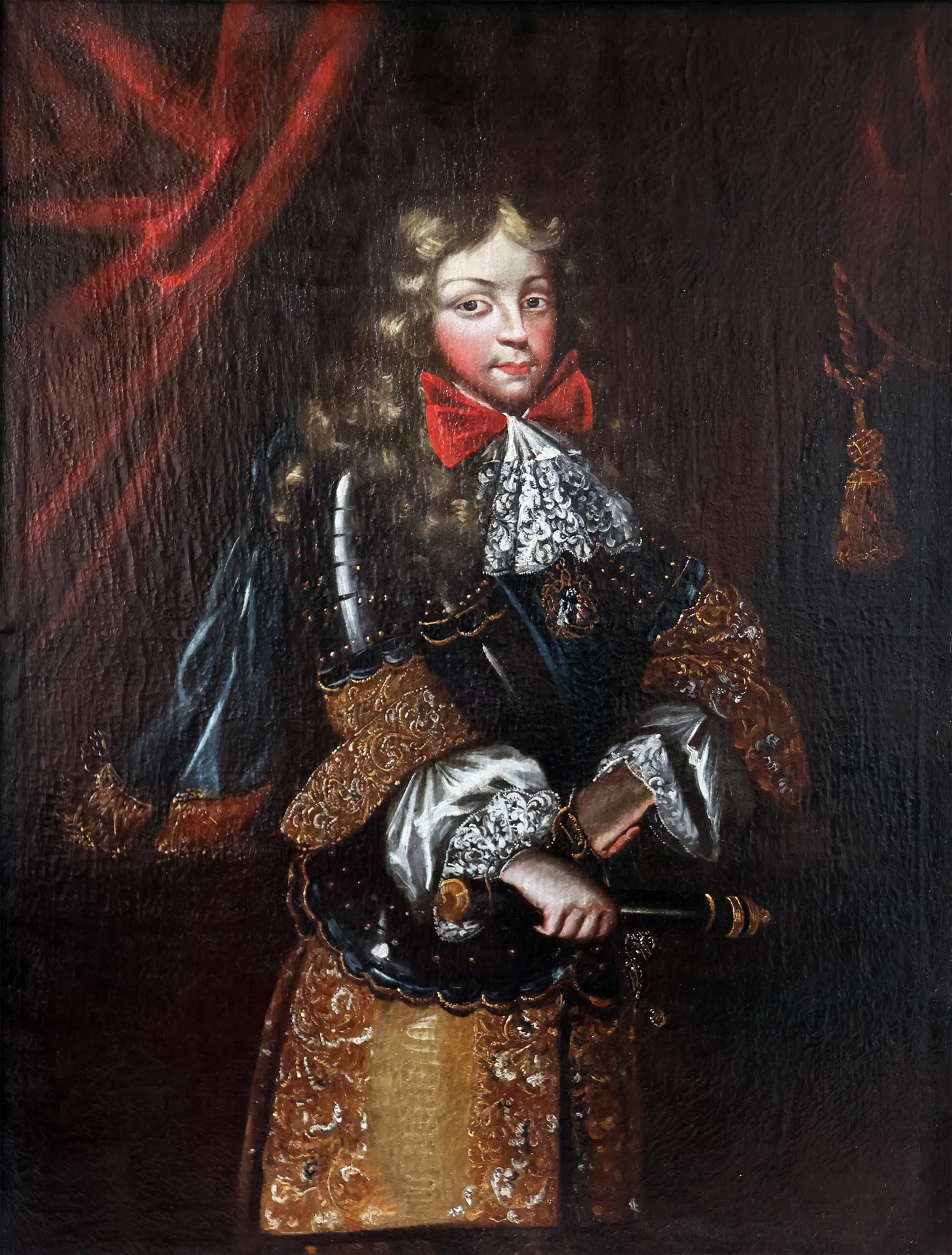
portrait by Laurent Dufour, Portrait of Victor Amedée II, Duc de Savoye, early-17th-century engraving

Having succeeded in ending his mother's power in Savoy, Victor Amadeus looked to his oncoming marriage with the youngest child of Philippe I, Duke of Orléans (brother of Louis XIV) and Henrietta of England. The contract of marriage between Anne Marie and the Duke of Savoy was signed at Versailles on 9 April; On 10 April 1684, Anne Marie was married at Versailles, by proxy, to Victor Amadeus. The couple were married in person on 6 May 1684.

=== The Vaudois ===
At the urging of Louis, Victor Amadeus II began a large-scale persecution of the Vaudois (Piedmontese and Savoyard Protestants) in 1685. The state had been bankrupted due to various conflicts and a famine in 1679 which had used all last resources. Due to his alliances with England and the Dutch Republic during the Nine Years' War, he was forced to cease this practice from 1688, and in 1694 granted an Edict of Toleration. However, in 1698 Louis XIV forced him to expel all Protestant immigrants from Savoy in accordance with a treaty of 1696.

During this period he became anxious to free himself of domination by Louis, and his first sign of independence was his independent visit to Venice in 1687, where he conferred with Prince Eugene of Savoy and others. Louis discovered this and demanded that Victor Amadeus launch another expedition against the Vaudois; he grudgingly complied, but as described below soon chose the allies countering France.

=== Internal reforms ===
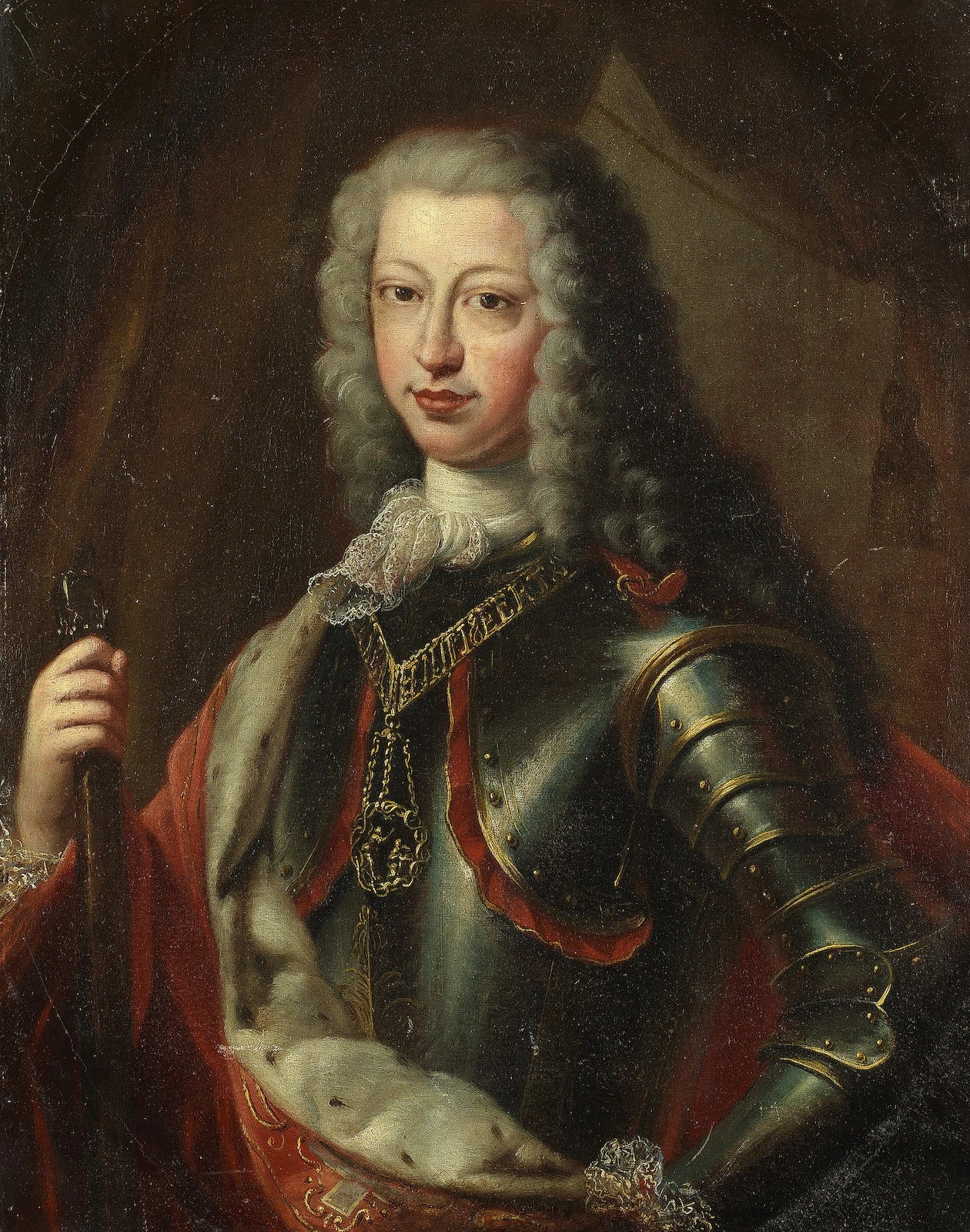
A portrait presumed to be Victor Amadeus II wearing armour

Victor Amadeus II undertook sweeping administrative reforms within Savoy. In 1696 he established a system of intendants, based on the French model, responsible for collecting taxes and law enforcement. In 1697 he began a land survey which was largely completed by 1711, the Perequazione, to examine the land holdings and privileges of the Church and nobility.

In 1717 he reformed the secretariat system in Turin establishing individual secretaries for war, internal affairs and foreign affairs. From the 1670s he also had a new administrative zone built in Turin, around the ducal palace. This zone included a military academy, the ministry of war, a mint, and a customs house. This work was still ongoing upon his death.

Victor Amadeus also undertook a number of military reforms. Often when one of his key fortresses was under attack, he would replace its commanding officer with one of his most reliable and trusted leaders. In 1690 he established a select militia within his territories, and he later overhauled the militia system in 1714 and strictly codified it. This included an obligation for each region under his rule to provide some men for the militia based on population. From 1713 he also began to establish his own navy based on the limited Sicilian naval forces he had been granted.

Victor Amadeus was able to use the experienced armies he developed in foreign wars to establish more firm control within his territories. Faced with rebellion by Mondovì at the end of the century, he brought a force of veterans from the Nine Years War there and re-established his authority. He employed a similar strategy against an anti-tax riot in Cigliano in 1724.

== Foreign affairs ==
Under his mother's regency Savoy, despite being a state of the Holy Roman Empire, was closely linked to and heavily dependent upon France, essentially becoming a French satellite. Victor Amadeus II broke this link by joining alliances against France in both the Nine Years' War and the War of the Spanish Succession. Savoy was considered a valuable ally in both wars due to its geographical position, enabling a second front to be opened against France in the south. Savoy relied heavily on foreign subsidies, particularly from England and the Dutch Republic, in both wars to maintain its armies.

=== Nine Years' War ===
At the start of the Nine Years' War, Savoy had three regiments in the service of France in Flanders. Victor Amadeus struggled throughout the early part of the war to bring those troops back to his own use. Part of the agreement he reached with the Grand Alliance against France was that they would enable him to recover Pinerolo, which his predecessor and namesake had lost decades before. In 1692, he was the only member of the Grand Alliance to bring the war to French lands, invading the Dauphiné. In 1695 and 1696, he secretly negotiated a separate treaty with Louis XIV which included the return of Pinerolo to Savoy. Throughout the war, he greatly increased the size of the army of Savoy from about 8,500 to more than 24,000.

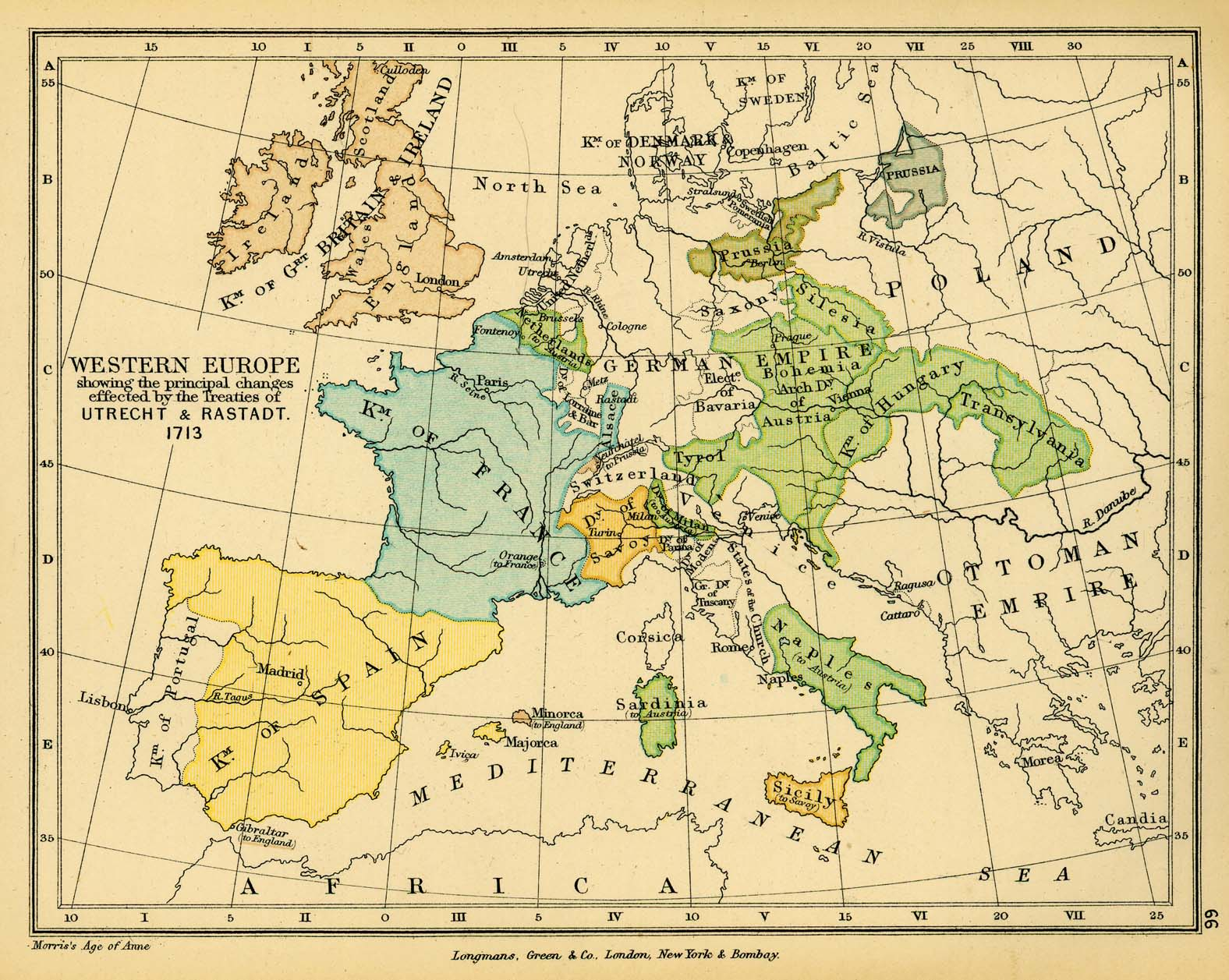
Map of Western Europe in 1713; the Duchy of Savoy can be seen yellow in the centre.

=== War of the Spanish Succession ===
During the War of the Spanish Succession, foreign subsidies amounted to almost half of the revenue raised by Savoy to fight the war. The end of the Nine Years' War had helped to design a new balance on the continent: at the death of the childless Charles II of Spain he left his throne to Philip, grandson of Louis XIV. The will stated that should Philip not accept it would go to his brother Charles. Victor Amadeus was himself in line to succeed, as a great-grandson of Infanta Catherine Michaela of Spain. As a result, Victor Amadeus expected compensation in the form of a territory which had been owned by the vast Spanish empire. Victor Amadeus had his eye on the Duchy of Milan which, having signed a treaty with Louis XIV, had support in conquering the duchy. With the Treaty of Vigevano in October 1696, however, Louis XIV's support waned. Victor Amadeus subsequently allied himself with Emperor Leopold I.

England and Austria ignored his claim, the latter of which had a candidate in the person of Archduke Charles, who immediately proclaimed himself King of Spain. The Grand Duke of Tuscany also ignored his claims. In the meantime, he pursued the expansion of Savoy and bought various fiefdoms of the Holy Roman Empire. Victor Amadeus was in a position where on most sides of Savoy was a Bourbon ruler, the enemy of Philip V, and he was forced to let French troops enter his lands in order to get Milan which Victor Amadeus had wanted so greatly. Forced to ally himself again this time with Louis XIV and his grandson in Spain, his daughter Maria Luisa was used as a pawn to seal this alliance. His daughter subsequently married Philip V in 1701. In 1701, he fought bravely at the Battle of Chiari, fought in the name of Bourbon control of Milan. By 1702, Victor Amadeus was considering changing allegiance to the emperor again having entered secret correspondence with the emperor who promised him the Duchy of Montferrat. In order to appease him, the emperor increased his bribe, adding various territories in Lombardy, Victor Amadeus having ignored him.

In 1703, Victor Amadeus switched sides, joining the Grand Alliance as he had in the Nine Years' War. Savoy fared particularly badly against the larger French forces resulting in a siege of Turin in 1706. Anne Marie's uncle, Louis XIV (along with Spanish forces from Anne Marie's second cousin Philip V of Spain), besieged Turin during the Battle of Turin. French troops were under the control of Anne Marie's half-brother, the Duke of Orléans. She and her sons were forced to flee Turin with the grandmother for the safety of Genoa. Turin was saved by the combined forces of Victor Amadeus and Prince Eugene of Savoy in September 1706.

== King of Sicily ==
As a result of his aid in the War of the Spanish Succession, Victor Amadeus II gained the Kingdom of Sicily in 1713 under the Treaty of Utrecht which ended the war. Being crowned King of Sicily in Palermo on 24 December 1713, he returned to Turin in September 1714.

As ruler of an independent kingdom and a key player in the recent war, Victor Amadeus significantly expanded his foreign relations. As a duke, he had envoys and embassies in France, the Empire, and Rome. In 1717, he established his own foreign office.

== King of Sardinia ==
Victor Amadeus in 1720 was forced to exchange Sicily for the less important kingdom of Sardinia after objections from an alliance of four nations, including several of his former allies. The duke was a marquis, prince and perpetual vicar in the Holy Roman Empire.

=== Abdication and later years ===
Having done much to improve the state of his inheritance in 1684, Victor Amadeus decided to abdicate in September 1730. The lonely king had lost most of his family, including his favourite and eldest son the Prince of Piedmont, and sought the security of a previous mistress Anna Canalis di Cumiana. The couple were married in a private ceremony on 12 August 1730 in the Royal Chapel in Turin having obtained permission from Pope Clement XII. Still attractive in her forties, Victor Amadeus had long been in love with her and as a wedding gift, created her the Marchioness of Spigno. The couple made their marriage public on 3 September 1730 much to the dismay of the court. A month later, Victor Amadeus announced his wish to abdicate the throne and did so in a ceremony at the Castle of Rivoli on the day of his marriage. His son succeeded him as Charles Emmanuel III.

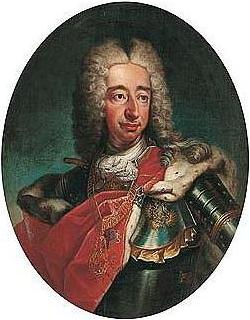
Victor Amadeus in his later years

Taking the style of King Victor Amadeus, he and Anna moved into the château de Chambéry outside the capital. The couple took a small retinue of servants and Victor Amadeus was kept informed of matters of state. He insisted on having a Louis XIV-style wig with him at all times as his only luxury.

Under the influence of Anna, in 1731 having suffered a stroke, Victor Amadeus decided he wanted to resume his tenure on the throne and informed his son of his decision. Arrested by his son, he was transported to the Castle of Moncalieri and Anna was taken to a house for reformed prostitutes at the Castle of Ceva but was later allowed to return to the Castle of Rivoli where her husband was moved. She was returned to him on 12 April. The stroke seemed to have affected Victor Amadeus in a way which caused him to later turn violent towards his wife, blaming her for his misfortunes.

King Victor Amadeus died on 31 October 1732 and was buried in the Convent of San Giuseppe di Carignano. His son decided not to bury him in the Basilica of Superga which Victor Amadeus had built and where he asked to be buried, as his son did not want to remind the public of the scandal which his abdication had caused. Anna was moved to the Convent of the Visitation in Pinerolo where she died aged 88.

== Cultural legacy ==
Despite his political reforms and his passion for trying to increase the importance of Savoy in Europe, Victor Amadeus left a considerable cultural legacy in the city of his birth. In 1697 Victor Amadeus commissioned Le Notre to lay out large gardens at the Palace of Turin where he had previously commissioned the Viennese Daniel Seiter to paint a famous gallery which exists to this day. Victor Amadeus subsequently had Seiter knighted. He also encouraged musical patronage in Savoy and the court became a centre for various musicians of the period.

Being crowned King of Sicily in Palermo on 24 December 1713, he returned to Turin in September 1714. From Palermo he brought back Filippo Juvarra, an Italian architect who had spent many years in Rome. Juvarra was patronised by Victor Amadeus and was the mind behind the remodelling of the Royal Palace of Turin, Palace of Venaria, Palazzina di caccia of Stupinigi as well as building the Basilica of Superga. The architect was also responsible for various roads and piazzas in Turin. Victor Amadeus' mother also used Juvarra for the famous staircase within the Palazzo Madama where she lived after being banished.

In 1997 the UNESCO added a group of buildings which were connected to Victor Amadeus and his family to be added to have World Heritage status. These buildings including the Royal Palace, the Palazzo Madama, the Palazzina di caccia of Stupinigi and his wife's Villa della Regina were grouped as the Residences of the Royal House of Savoy.

== Family and issue ==
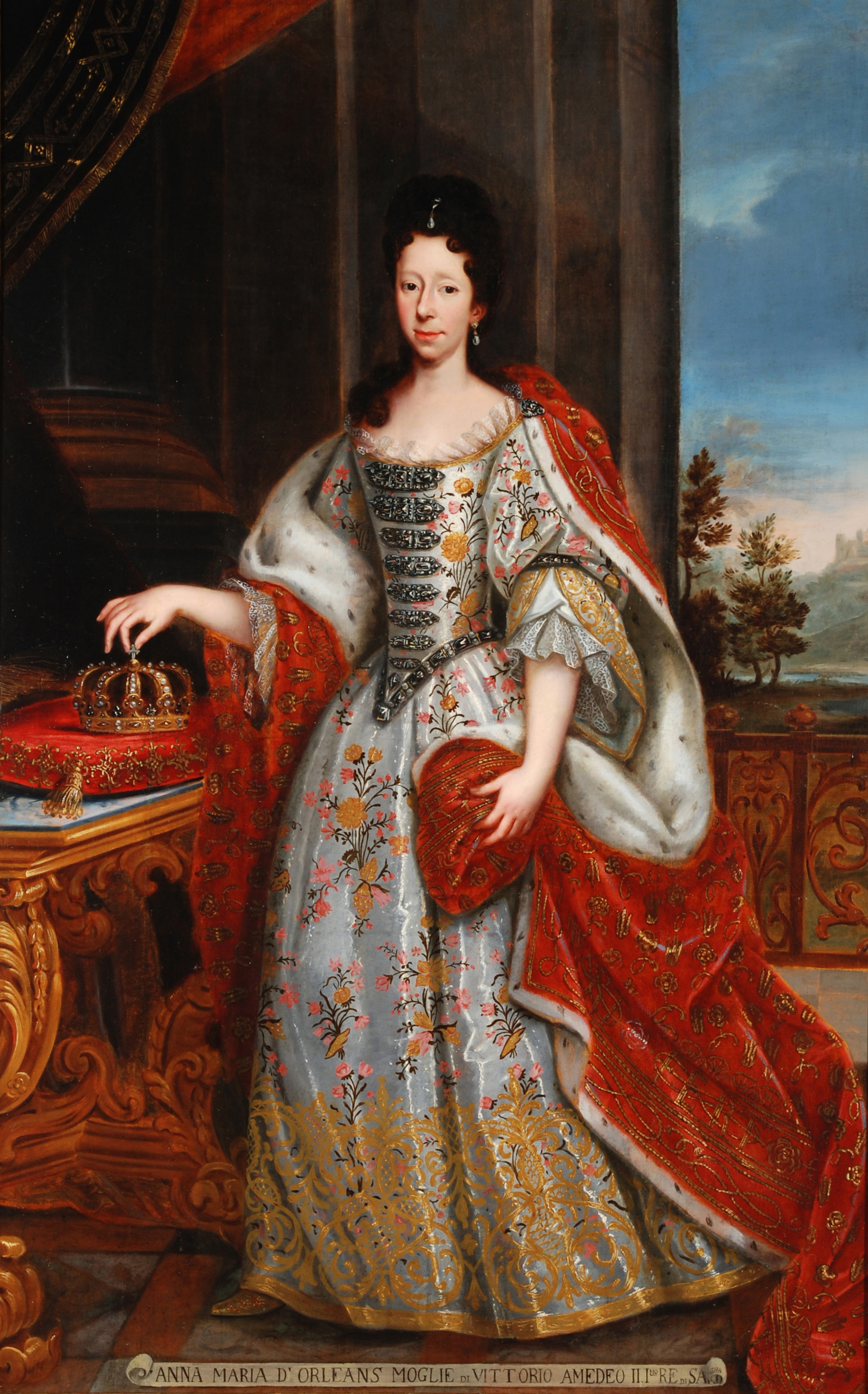
His wife, Anne Marie d'Orléans

His distant relationship with his mother was always strained and has been blamed on her ambition to keep power to herself. Marie Jeanne spent most of her time relegated to state business which she enjoyed and had little time for her only child whom she kept under close supervision in order to make sure he would not try to assume power. Anne Marie gave her husband six children but also had two stillbirths of each gender, one in 1691 and again in 1697. Three of these children would go on to have further progeny, including the eldest Maria Adelaide, who was the mother of Louis XV of France. His second daughter Maria Luisa, known in the family as Louison, would marry Philip V of Spain in 1701 and was also regent of Spain for various periods. These two marriages were tactics used by Louis XIV to keep Victor Amadeus close to France prior to the War of the Spanish Succession.

Anne Marie would remain a devoted wife. She quietly accepted his extramarital affairs; the longest one being with the famed beauty Jeanne Baptiste d'Albert de Luynes by whom he had two children. Jeanne Baptiste was his mistress for eleven years and eventually fled Savoy due to Victor Amadeus' obsession with her. Victor Amadeus subsequently had his daughter with Jeanne Baptiste, Maria Vittoria, marry the Prince of Carignano from which the present Vittorio Emanuele, Prince of Naples is a direct descendant. His favourite child was Victor Amadeus born in 1699 and given the title Prince of Piedmont as heir apparent. The Prince of Piedmont later died in 1715 from smallpox. Anne Marie died in 1728 after a series of heart attacks.

His relationship with his younger son and eventual successor Charles Emmanuel III was a cold one and the two were never close. Victor Amadeus organised the first two marriages of Charles Emmanuel, the first one being to Anne Christine of Sulzbach, daughter of the Count Palatine of Sulzbach, which produced a son who died in infancy. The second marriage was to Polyxena of Hesse-Rotenburg, a first cousin of Anne Christine and mother of six children, including the future Victor Amadeus III of Sardinia.

=== Legitimate issue ===
- Maria Adélaïde of Savoy (1685–1712), married Louis, Duke of Burgundy, eldest son of Louis, Grand Dauphin, and had issue including Louis XV;
- Maria Anna of Savoy (14 August 1687 – 18 April 1690) died in early childhood;
- Maria Luisa of Savoy (1688–1714), married Philip V of Spain, second son of Louis, Grand Dauphin, and had issue including two kings of Spain;
- Victor Amadeus of Savoy (1699–1715) died unmarried;
- Charles Emmanuel of Savoy (1701–1773), Duke of Savoy then later King of Sardinia;
- Emanuele Philibert of Savoy (1 December 1705 – 19 December 1705), died in infancy;

=== Illegitimate issue ===
- Maria Vittoria of Savoy (1690–1766), married Victor Amadeus I, Prince of Carignano and had issue, later legitimised;
- Vittorio Francesco of Savoy (1694–1762), married Maria Lucrezia Franchi di Pont, had no issue, later legitimised.

== Appearances in media ==
Victor Amadeus II is a main character of the 1990 film, The King's Whore, in which he is played by Timothy Dalton. The movie focuses primarily on his obsessive relationship with Jeanne de Luynes, portrayed by Valeria Golino.

== Ancestors ==
Ancestors of Victor Amadeus II

8. Charles Emmanuel I, Duke of Savoy
4. Victor Amadeus I, Duke of Savoy
9. Catherine Michelle of Austria
2. Charles Emmanuel II, Duke of Savoy
10. Henry IV of France
5. Christine of France
11. Marie de' Medici
1. Victor Amadeus II of Sardinia
12. Henri I, Duke of Nemours
6. Charles Amadeus, Duke of Nemours
13. Anne, Duchess of Aumale
3. Marie Jeanne Baptiste of Savoy
14. César, Duke of Vendôme
7. Élisabeth de Bourbon
15. Françoise of Lorraine

== Sources ==
- The Gentleman's and London magazine: or monthly chronologer, 1741–1794, J. Exshaw., 1741
- Chisholm, Hugh, ed. (1911). "Victor Amedeus II." . Encyclopædia Britannica. Vol. 28 (11th ed.). Cambridge University Press. p. 28.
- Anselme de Sainte-Marie, Père (1726). Histoire généalogique et chronologique de la maison royale de France [Genealogical and chronological history of the royal house of France] (in French). Vol. 1 (3rd ed.). Paris: La compagnie des libraires.
- Frézet, Jean (1827). Histoire de la Maison de Savoie. Vol. 2. Alliana et Paravia.
- Oresko, Robert (2004). "Maria Giovanna Battista of Savoy-Nemours (1644–1724): daughter, consort, and Regent of Savoy". In Campbell Orr, Clarissa (ed.). Queenship in Europe 1660–1815: The Role of the Consort. Cambridge University Press. pp. 16–55. ISBN 0-521-81422-7.
- Ragnhild, Marie Hatton (1997). Royal and republican sovereignty in early modern Europe. Cambridge University Press. ISBN 0-521-41910-7.
- Storrs, Christopher (1999). War, diplomacy and the rise of Savoy, 1690-1720. Cambridge: Cambridge University Press. ISBN 0-521-55146-3.
- Symcox, Geoffrey (1983). Victor Amadeus II: absolutism in the Savoyard State, 1675–1730. Berkeley: University of California Press. ISBN 978-0-520-04974-1.
- Vitelleschi, The Marchese (1905a). The romance of Savoy, Victor Amadeus II. and his Stuart bride. Vol. I. New York: Harvard College Library.
- Vitelleschi, The Marchese (1905b). The romance of Savoy, Victor Amadeus II. and his Stuart bride. Vol. II. New York: Harvard College Library.

Victor Amadeus II House of Savoy Born: 14 May 1666 Died: 31 October 1732
Regnal titles
Preceded by Charles Emmanuel II	Duke of Savoy; 1675–1730	Succeeded by Charles Emmanuel III
Preceded by Emperor Charles VI	King of Sardinia; 1720–1730	Succeeded by Charles Emmanuel III
Preceded by Philip V of Spain	King of Sicily; 1713–1720	Succeeded by Emperor Charles VI
