= Victor Amadeus, Prince of Piedmont =

Victor Amadeus
- Prince of Piedmont
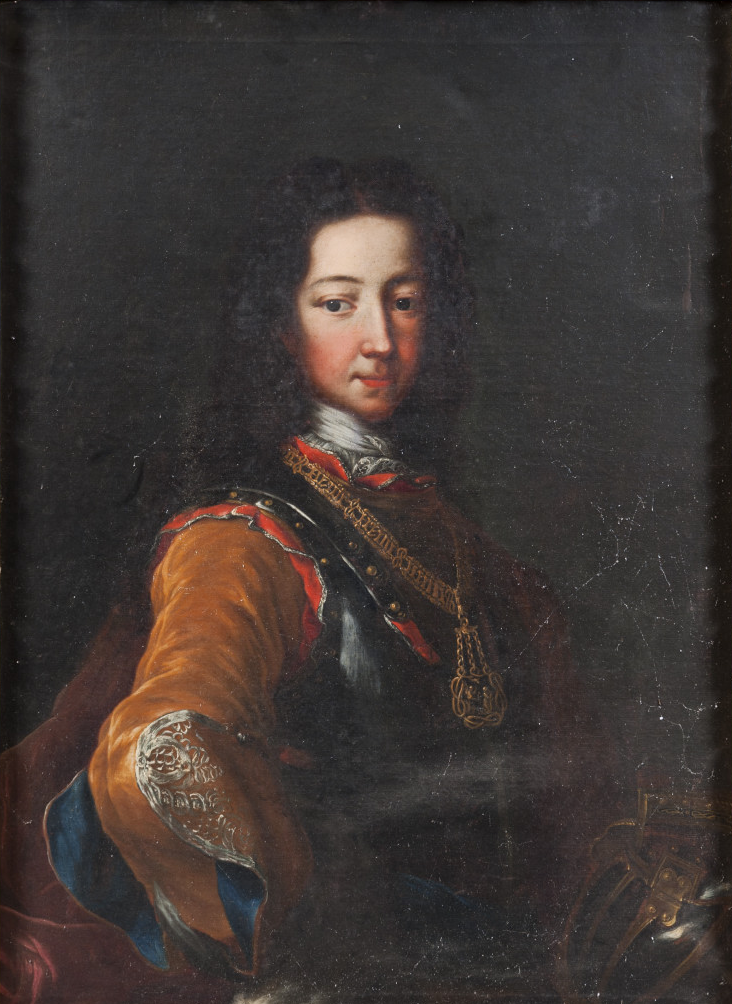
- Portrait c. 1715
- Born: 6 May 1699; Royal Palace of Turin
- Died: 22 March 1715 (aged 15); Royal Palace of Turin
- Burial: Royal Basilica of Superga, Turin
Names
- Vittorio Amedeo Filippo Giuseppe di Savoia
- House: Savoy
- Father: Victor Amadeus II, Duke of Savoy
- Mother: Anne Marie d'Orléans

Victor Amadeus of Savoy (Vittorio Amedeo Filippo Giuseppe; 6 May 1699 – 22 March 1715) was the eldest son of Victor Amadeus II, Duke of Savoy and his French wife Anne Marie d'Orléans. He was the heir apparent of Savoy from his birth and as such was styled as the Prince of Piedmont. He acted as Regent of Savoy from September 1713 till September 1714 in the absences of his father. He died of smallpox at the age of 15.

== Biography ==
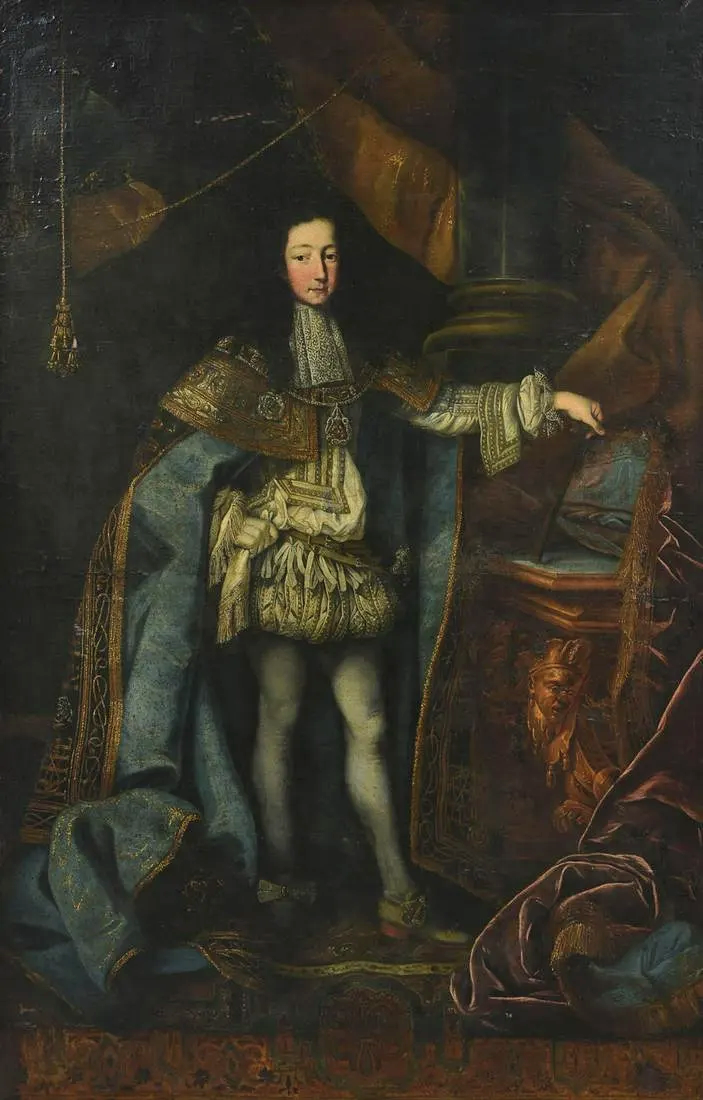
Portrait of Victor Amadeus

The Prince of Piedmont was born in Turin on 6 May 1699. He was the fifth child and first son of his parents, Victor Amadeus II of Savoy and Anne Marie d'Orléans, and was baptised with the names Victor Amadeus John Philip. He remained close to his father all his life. Though his parents were not close he also had a close relationship with his mother, a niece of King Louis XIV of France.

From birth he was styled as the Prince of Piedmont, the typical style for the heir apparent to the Duke of Savoy. Victor Amadeus was born at a time when the House of Savoy was in need of a male heir to succeed as the duchy observed Salic law which forbade females to inherit the throne. His birth was greeted with great celebration and throughout his life, his health required constant attention. During the Battle of Turin, he, his mother, grandmother and younger brother, Charles Emmanuel, had to flee Turin for their safety and go to Genoa. His father took part in the battle which was played out to west of the city. The prince was moved from female care in 1708.

In 1713, at the end of the War of the Spanish Succession, by the Treaty of Utrecht, Sicily was ceded to the Duke of Savoy, Victor Amadeus's father. As such, Victor Amadeus became the heir to a kingdom rather than just a duchy. In September his parents set off for Palermo in Sicily in order to be crowned officially. Victor Amadeus II asked his mother, Marie Jeanne of Savoy, to maintain a regency in his absence but she declined and the younger Victor Amadeus was given the post. Victor Amadeus's regency ended when his father returned in September 1714. Strained relations between Savoy and Austria caused plans for the Prince of Piedmont to wed Maria Amalia, a daughter of the late Emperor Joseph I, but plans were ignored by his father. There were also negotiations for Victor Amadeus to wed Infanta Francisca Josefa of Portugal or Elisabeth Farnese.

Victor Amadeus died in Turin on 22 March 1715 having caught smallpox. He was buried at the Turin Cathedral and later moved to the Basilica of Superga outside Turin. His body is located in the Sala degli Infanti (Hall of the Infantes [children]). He was succeeded as Prince of Piedmont by his younger brother, Charles Emmanuel.

== Ancestry ==
Ancestors of Victor Amadeus, Prince of Piedmont

8. Victor Amadeus I, Duke of Savoy
4. Charles Emmanuel II, Duke of Savoy
9. Princess Christine of France
2. Victor Amadeus II of Savoy
10. Charles Amadeus of Savoy, Duke of Nemours
5. Princess Marie Jeanne of Savoy
11. Élisabeth de Bourbon, Mademoiselle de Vendôme
1. Prince Victor Amadeus of Savoy
12. Louis XIII of France
6. Philippe I, Duke of Orléans
13. Archduchess Anne of Austria
3. Anne Marie d'Orléans, Princess of France
14. Charles I of England
7. Princess Henrietta of England
15. Princess Henrietta Maria of France

== Sources ==
- Storrs, Christopher (1999). War, diplomacy and the rise of Savoy, 1690-1720 (1st ed.). Cambridge: Cambridge University Press. ISBN 0-521-55146-3.
- Symcox, Geoffrey (1983). Victor Amadeus II : absolution in the Savoyard State 1675-1730. Berkeley, u.a.: University of California Press. ISBN 978-0-520-04974-1.
- Williams, Hugh Noel (1909). A Rose of Savoy: Marie Adélaïde of Savoy, Duchesse de Bourgogne, Mother of Louis XV. New York: Charles Scribner's Sons.
- Tettoni, Leone (1868). Le illustri alleanze della real casa di Savoia (in Italian).
- Armstrong, Edward (1892). Elisabeth Farnes: The Termagant of Spain. Longmans, Green, and Company.
