= Anne Marie d'Orléans =

Queen of Sardinia and Duchess of Savoy

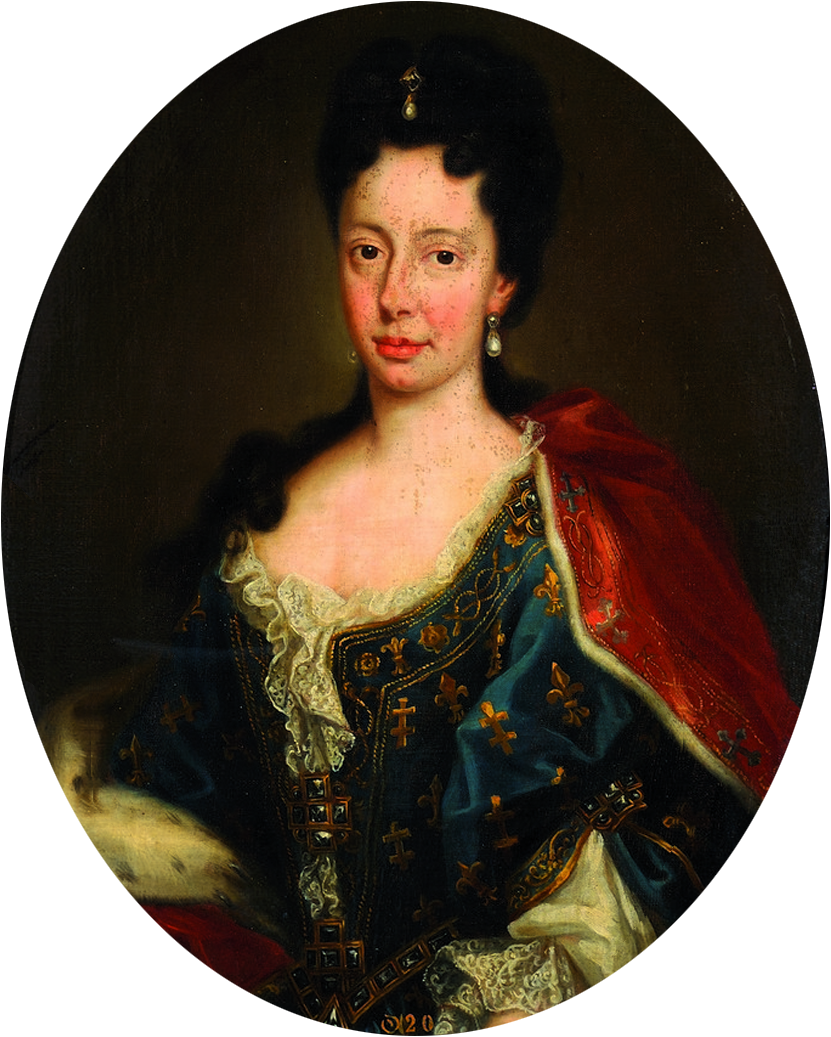

Queen consort of Sardinia
- Tenure: 24 August 1720 – 26 August 1728

Queen consort of Sicily
- Tenure: 11 April 1713 – 17 February 1720
- Coronation: 24 December 1713

Duchess consort of Savoy
- Tenure: 10 April 1684 – 26 August 1728
- Born: 27 August 1669; Château de Saint-Cloud, France
- Died: 26 August 1728 (aged 58); Villa della Regina, Piedmont
- Burial: Basilica of Superga
- Spouse: Victor Amadeus II of Sardinia (m. 1684)
- Issue Detail: Maria Adelaide, Dauphine of France; Maria Luisa, Queen of Spain; Victor Amadeus, Prince of Piedmont; Charles Emmanuel III
- House: Orléans
- Father: Philippe I, Duke of Orléans
- Mother: Henrietta of England

Anne Marie d'Orléans (27 August 1669 – 26 August 1728) was Queen of Sardinia by marriage to King Victor Amadeus II. She served as regent of Savoy during the absence of her spouse in 1686 and again during the War of the Spanish Succession.

Anne Marie was for a period heiress presumptive to the Jacobite claim to the thrones of England, Scotland, and Ireland, a claim which eventually went to the Protestant House of Hanover.

== Youth ==
Her father was Philippe I, Duke of Orléans, younger brother of Louis XIV, and her mother was Henrietta of England, the youngest daughter of Charles I of England. Her mother died at the Château de Saint-Cloud ten months after Anne Marie's birth. A year later, her father married 19-year-old Elizabeth Charlotte of the Palatinate, who became very close to Anne, her step-daughter. Her half-brother Philippe II, Duke of Orléans, the future Regent of France, was born of her father's second marriage.

Her stepmother Elizabeth later described her as "one of the most amiable and virtuous of women".

== Marriage ==
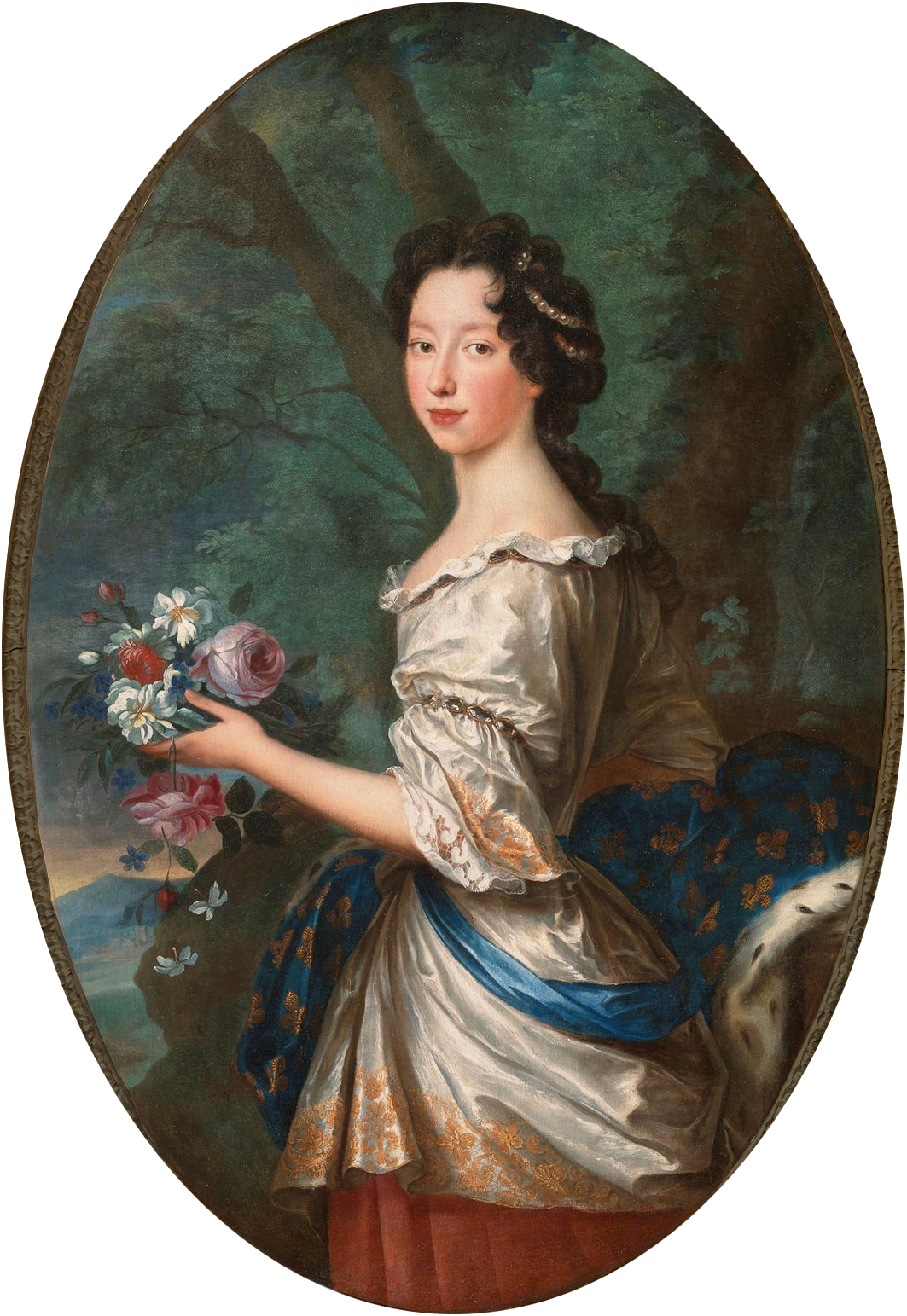
Portrait of Anne Marie by Louis Ferdinand Elle the Younger, 1683

To maintain French influence in the Italian states, her uncle Louis XIV arranged her marriage, at the age of fourteen to Victor Amadeus II, then Duke of Savoy, later King of Sicily and then of Sardinia. Both of them were great-grandchildren of King Henry IV of France and Marie de' Medici through three of their children. Additionally, Victor Amadeus was the great-great-grandson of Henry IV via Henry's illegitimate son César de Bourbon. Louis XIV was an ally of her future mother-in-law, Marie Jeanne, and supported Marie Jeanne when she extended her regency even after her actual mandate as regent had come to an end in 1680: Marie Jeanne did, in fact, not surrender her position as regent until shortly before her son's wedding.

The proxy marriage of Anne Marie and Víctor Amadeus took place at Versailles on 10 April 1684, the day after the signing of the marriage contract. Her husband-to-be was represented by her cousin, Louis-Auguste, Duke of Maine. Louis XIV gave her a dowry of 900,000 livres.

The Duke of Orléans accompanied his daughter as far as Juvisy-sur-Orge (18 kilometers south of Paris), and the comtesse de Lillebonne accompanied her all the way to Savoy. She met her husband Victor at Chambéry on 6 May, the nuptials being performed at the castle by the Archbishop of Grenoble. Two days later, the newlyweds made their "Joyous Entry" into Turin.

Anne Marie bore eight children, beginning with Marie-Adélaïde just a few months after Anne Marie's 16th birthday. The birth nearly cost Anne Marie her life, prompting the administration of the viaticum. Marie-Adélaïde married Louis, Duke of Burgundy, grandson of Louis XIV in 1697, and was the mother of Louis XV.

This marriage was arranged with the assistance of the maréchal de Tessé and of Jeanne Baptiste d'Albert de Luynes, Comtesse de Verrué, who was Victor's mistress from 1689 till 1700.

== Duchess and Queen ==
After her arrival in Savoy, Anne Marie came under the influence of her pro-French mother-in-law, who maintained a powerful position as a French ally at the court of Savoy. She was described as a dutiful and humble daughter-in-law, who loyally adhered to Marie Jeanne's wishes. Her close relationship with her mother-in-law was not viewed favorably by her spouse, who regarded it as a political threat, as he had long been opposed to his mother's influence in politics.

The personal relationship between Anne Marie and Victor Amadeus was reportedly somewhat cool during the first years of their marriage, partly due to the adultery on his part and his disappointment that she did not give birth to a son for several years. Anne Marie served as regent for the first time in 1686, and was said to have handled the task well despite her young age.

When Victor Amadeus severed his ties with France in 1690, Anne Marie and her children accompanied her mother-in-law when they left the capital in protest.

Despite his marriage ties to France, Victor Amadeus joined the anti-French side in the War of the Spanish Succession. Anne Marie was appointed by him to serve as regent of Savoy during his absence in the war, a task she handled with maturity and judgment. In 1706, Turin was besieged by French forces under the command of Anne Marie's half-brother Philippe d'Orléans, and Spanish forces of her cousin and son-in-law Philip V. She and her sons Victor Amadeus and Carlo Emanuele were forced to flee to Genoa.

When the war was ended in 1713 by the Treaty of Utrecht, Victor Amadeus received the Kingdom of Sicily, formerly a Spanish possession. Anne Marie's stepmother wrote: I shall neither gain nor lose by the peace, but one thing I shall enjoy is to see our Duchess of Savoy become a queen, because I love her as though she were my own child ... When Victor Amadeus left for his coronation in Sicily, he had originally planned to leave Anne Marie behind to function as regent in his absence, but as he feared that she would let herself be directed by his mother due to her loyalty to her mother-in-law, he changed his mind and took her along with him instead. Anne Marie was crowned with him in Sicily.

At the death of her eldest son in 1715, both she and Victor Amadeus fell into severe depression and left the capital to mourn, leaving Marie Jeanne to handle their official duties. In 1720, Victor Amadeus retained his title of King but was forced to exchange Sicily for the less important duchy of Sardinia. As the Savoyard consort, Anne-Marie had the use of the Royal Palace of Turin, the vast Palazzina di caccia di Stupinigi outside the capital, and the Vigna di Madama Reale.

Queen Anne Marie died of heart failure at her villa on 26 August 1728, aged 58. She is buried at the Basilica of Superga in Turin, where all her children, except Marie-Adélaïde and Maria Luisa, are also buried.

== Jacobite succession ==
From 1714 to 1720, Anne Marie d'Orléans was the heiress presumptive to the Jacobite claim to the thrones of England, Scotland, and Ireland. These claims were held at the time by her first cousin James Francis Edward Stuart ("the Old Pretender", son of James II). Anne Marie became heiress presumptive with the death of James II's daughter Queen Anne in 1714 which left her and her cousin James as the only surviving legitimate grandchildren of Charles I. She was displaced as heir by the birth of the Old Pretender's son, Charles Edward Stuart ("Bonnie Prince Charlie"), on 31 December 1720.

Charles Edward and his brother Henry, Cardinal Stuart, both died without legitimate issue, so the descendants of Anne Marie d'Orléans inherited the Jacobite claim, i.e. they would have inherited the British crown had it not been for the Act of Settlement, which excluded the claims of the Catholic Stuarts and d'Orléans and settled the throne on the nearest Protestant relatives, the Hanoverians.

== Issue ==
Anne Marie gave birth to eight children, of whom only three survived to adulthood, and only one outlived her:

- Princess Maria Adelaide of Savoy (b. Turin, 6 December 1685 – d. Versailles, 12 February 1712), married Louis, Duke of Burgundy, eldest son of Louis, Grand Dauphin; she was the mother of Louis XV of France.
- Princess Maria Anna of Savoy (b. Turin, 14 August 1687 – d. Turin, 5 August 1690), died in childhood.
- Princess Maria Luisa Gabriella of Savoy (b. Turin, 17 September 1688 – d. Madrid, 14 February 1714), married King Philip V of Spain, the second son of Louis, Grand Dauphin. Had issue of 4 sons, none of which had any issue themselves.
- Stillborn daughter (Turin, 19 July 1691).
- Stillborn son (Turin, 9 November 1697).
- Victor Amadeus Filippo Giuseppe, Prince of Piedmont (b. Turin, 6 May 1699 – d. of smallpox, Turin, 22 March 1715), died aged fifteen.
- Charles Emmanuel III of Savoy (b. Turin, 27 April 1701 – d. Turin, 20 February 1773), King of Sardinia. Had issue. Of his ten children, only one had issue.
- Prince Emmanuel Philibert of Savoy (b. Turin, 1 December 1705 – d. Turin, 19 December 1705), Duke of Chablais; died in childhood.

== Ancestors ==
Ancestors of Anne Marie d'Orléans

8. Henry IV of France
4. Louis XIII of France
9. Marie de' Medici
2. Philippe I, Duke of Orléans
10. Philip III of Spain
5. Anne of Austria
11. Margaret of Austria
1. Anne Marie of Orléans
12. James I of England
6. Charles I of England
13. Anne of Denmark
3. Henrietta of England
14. Henry IV of France (= 8)
7. Henrietta Maria of France
15. Marie de' Medici (= 9)

== Sources ==
- Oresko, Robert (2004). "Maria Giovanna Battista of Savoy-Nemours (1644–1724): daughter, consort, and Regent of Savoy". In Campbell Orr, Clarissa (ed.). Queenship in Europe 1660–1815: The Role of the Consort. Cambridge University Press. pp. 16–55. ISBN 0-521-81422-7.
- Storrs, Christopher (1999). War, Diplomacy and the Rise of Savoy 1690-1720. Cambridge University Press. ISBN 0521551463.
- Williams, H. Noel (1909). "A Rose of Savoy: Marie Adelaide of Savoy, Duchesse de Bourgogne, Mother of Louis XV". New York: Charles Scribner's Sons.

Anne Marie d'Orléans House of Orléans Cadet branch of the House of Bourbon Born: 27 August 1669 Died: 26 August 1728
Italian royalty
Vacant Title last held by Marie Jeanne of Savoy-Nemours	Duchess consort of Savoy; 1684–1728	Vacant Title next held by Polyxena Christina of Hesse-Rotenburg
Preceded by Elisabeth Christine of Brunswick-Wolfenbüttel	Queen consort of Sardinia; 1720–1728	Vacant Title next held by Polyxena Christina of Hesse-Rotenburg
Preceded by Maria Luisa of Savoy	Queen consort of Sicily; 1713–1720	Succeeded by Elisabeth Christine of Brunswick-Wolfenbüttel
