= Saint-Didier =

Saint Didier or Saint-Didier may refer to:

== People ==
- Didier of Cahors (c. 580-655), Merovingian royal official
- Didier of Vienne (died 607), archbishop of Vienne and chronicler
- Didier of Rennes (died c. 672), bishop
- Deodatus of Nevers (died 679), bishop of Nevers

== Places ==
- Saint-Didier, Côte-d'Or, in the Côte-d'Or département
- Saint-Didier, Ille-et-Vilaine, in the Ille-et-Vilaine département
- Saint-Didier, Jura, in the Jura département
- Saint-Didier, Nièvre, in the Nièvre département
- Saint-Didier, Vaucluse, in the Vaucluse département
- Saint-Didier-au-Mont-d'Or, in the Rhône département
- Saint-Didier-d'Allier, in the Haute-Loire département
- Saint-Didier-d'Aussiat, in the Ain département
- Saint-Didier-de-Bizonnes, in the Isère département
- Saint-Didier-de-Formans, in the Ain département
- Saint-Didier-de-la-Tour, in the Isère département
- Saint-Didier-des-Bois, in the Eure département
- Saint-Didier-en-Bresse, in the Saône-et-Loire département
- Saint-Didier-en-Brionnais, in the Saône-et-Loire département
- Saint-Didier-en-Donjon, in the Allier département
- Saint-Didier-en-Velay, in the Haute-Loire département
- Saint-Didier-la-Forêt, in the Allier département
- Saint-Didier-sous-Aubenas, in the Ardèche département
- Saint-Didier-sous-Écouves, in the Orne département
- Saint-Didier-sous-Riverie, in the Rhône département
- Saint-Didier-sur-Arroux, in the Saône-et-Loire département
- Saint-Didier-sur-Beaujeu, in the Rhône département
- Saint-Didier-sur-Chalaronne, in the Ain département
- Saint-Didier-sur-Doulon, in the Haute-Loire département
- Saint-Didier-sur-Rochefort, in the Loire département

== See also ==
- Didier (disambiguation)
