= Henri II, Duke of Nemours =

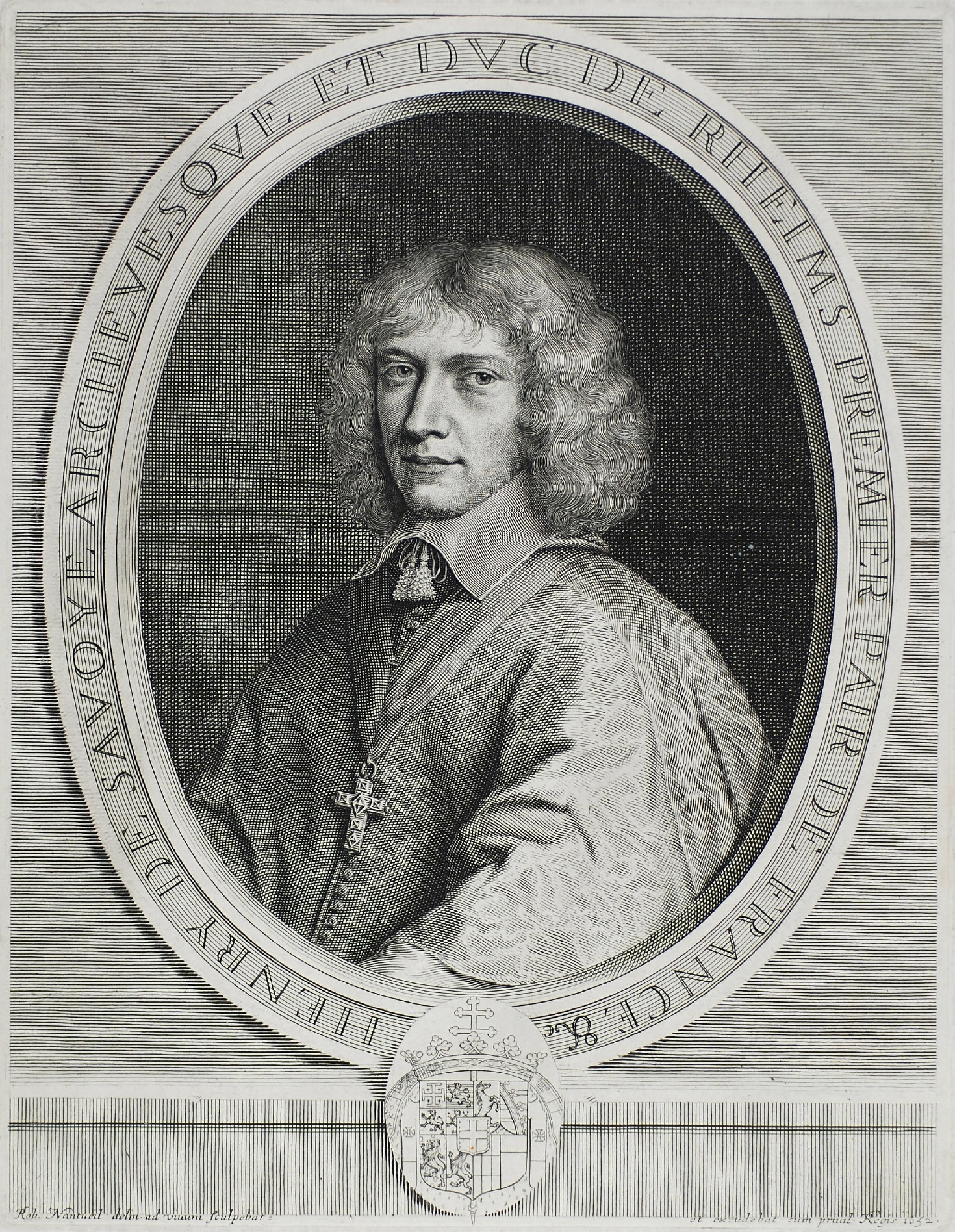
Portrait of Henri II, 7th Duc de Nemours, by Robert Nanteuil, 1652

Henri of Savoy (7 November 1625, Paris – 4 January 1659, Paris) was the seventh Duc de Nemours (1652–59), and was also Count of Geneva.

Henri, as the third son of Henri de Savoie, 4th Duc de Nemours, was not expected to succeed to the dukedom and entered the priesthood. By 1651, he had become Archbishop of Reims. When his brothers Louis and Charles both predeceased him without leaving sons, he was relieved of his vows and became Duc de Nemours in 1652. He married Marie d'Orleans (daughter of Henri d'Orléans, Duke of Longueville and Louise de Bourbon) in 1657, but died two years later without children. On his death, the title of Duke of Nemours reverted to the Crown. He was succeeded as Count of Geneva by his niece, Marie Jeanne Baptiste de Savoie, Duchess of Savoy.

French nobility
| Preceded by Charles of Savoy | Duke of Nemours; 1652–1659 | Extinct |
