= L'Hôpital-sous-Rochefort =

- Part of Solore-en-Forez
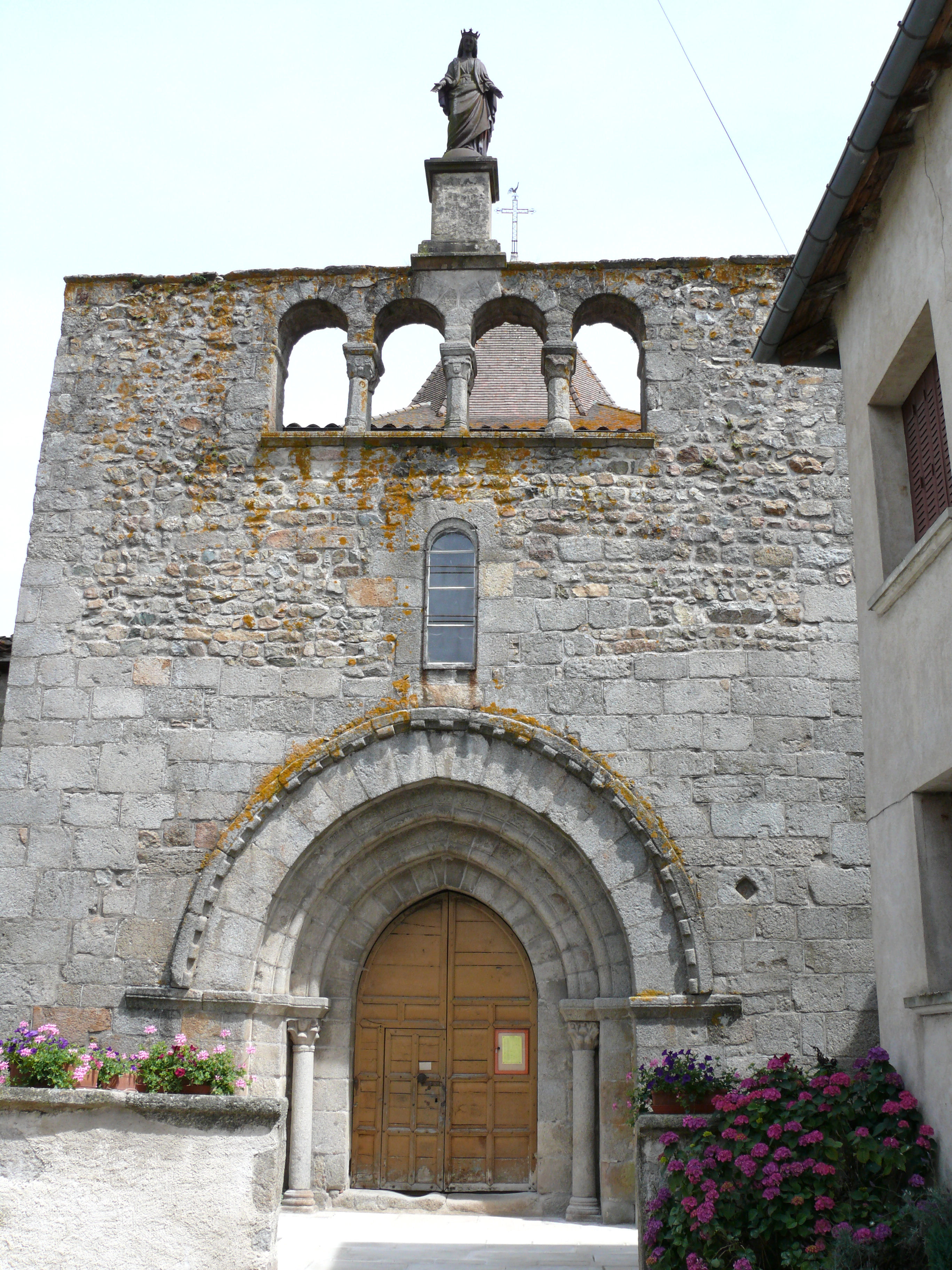

- Coat of arms
- Location of L'Hôpital-sous-Rochefort
- Location within France Location within Auvergne-Rhône-Alpes
- Coordinates: 45°46′29″N 3°56′04″E
- Country: France
- Region: Auvergne-Rhône-Alpes
- Department: Loire
- Arrondissement: Montbrison
- Canton: Boën-sur-Lignon
- Commune: Solore-en-Forez
- Area^{1}: 1.15 km^{2} (0.44 sq mi)
- Elevation: 427 m (1,401 ft)
- Highest elevation: 578 m (1,896 ft)
- Lowest elevation: 411 m (1,348 ft)
- Population (2022): 106
  - Density: 92.2/km^{2} (239/sq mi)
- Time zone: UTC+01:00 (CET)
  - Summer (DST): UTC+02:00 (CEST)
- Postal code: 42130
- ^{1} French Land Register data, which excludes lakes, ponds, glaciers > 1 km^{2} (0.386 sq mi or 247 acres) and river estuaries.

L'Hôpital-sous-Rochefort (French pronunciation: [lopital su ʁɔʃfɔʁ], literally L'Hôpital under Rochefort) is a former commune in the Loire department in central France. On 1 January 2025, it was merged into the new commune of Solore-en-Forez.

== Population ==
Historical population
Year	Pop.	±% p.a.
1968	244	—
1975	132	−8.40%
1982	132	+0.00%
1990	124	−0.78%
1999	109	−1.42%
2009	113	+0.36%
2014	115	+0.35%
2020	108	−1.04%
Source: INSEE

== See also ==
- Communes of the Loire department
