= Henri I, Duke of Nemours =

French noble (1572–1632)

Henri I
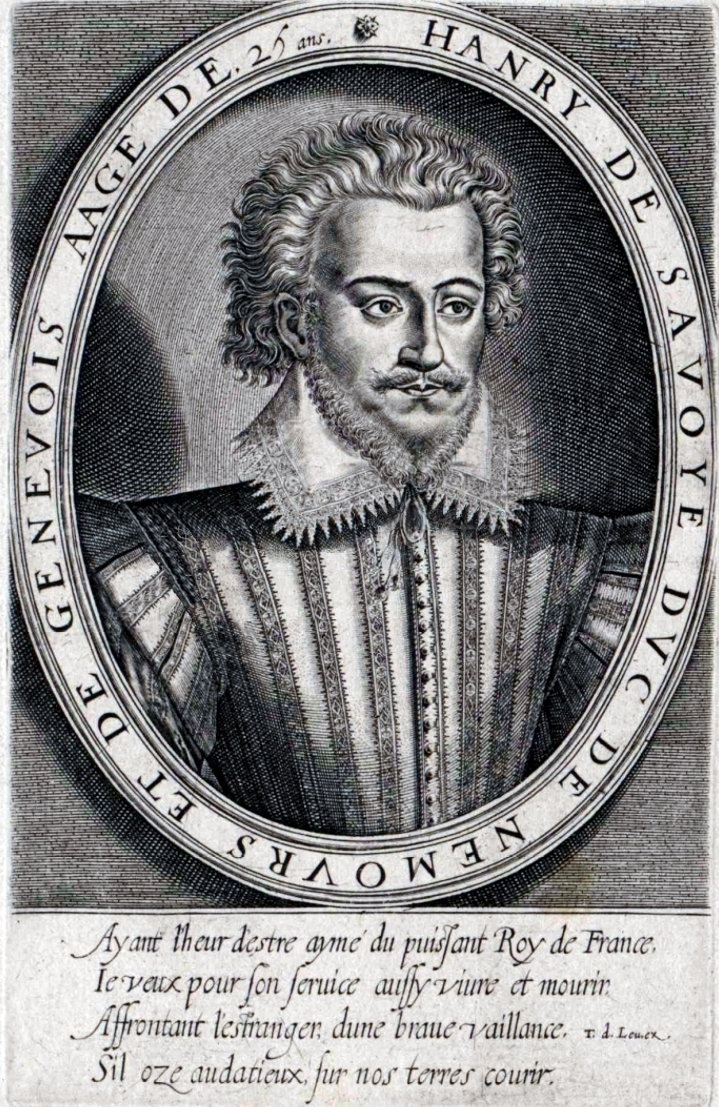
- 17th-century engraving of Henri
- Born: 2 November 1572; Paris
- Died: 10 July 1632 (aged 59); Paris
- Noble family: House of Savoy
- Spouse: Anne de Lorraine
- Issue: Louis I, Duke of Nemours; Charles Amadeus, Duke of Nemours; Henri II, Duke of Nemours
- Father: Jacques of Savoy
- Mother: Anna d'Este

Coats of Arms of the Dukes of Savoy after Emmanuel Philibert

Henri of Savoy (French: Henri de Savoie) (2 November 1572 – 10 July 1632), called originally Marquis de Saint-Sorlin, was the son of Jacques of Savoy and Anna d'Este, the widow of François de Lorraine, Duke of Guise. He succeeded his brother Charles Emmanuel as Duke of Nemours.

In 1588, he took the marquisate of Saluzzo from the French for his cousin, the Duke of Savoy. The princes of Guise, his half-brothers, induced him to join the League, and in 1591, he was made governor of Dauphiné in the name of that faction. He made his submission to Henry IV in 1596. After quarrelling with the duke of Savoy, he withdrew to Burgundy and joined the Spaniards in their war against Savoy. After peace had been proclaimed on 14 November 1616, he retired to the French court.

Henri married Anne de Lorraine, daughter of Charles de Lorraine, Duke of Aumale. They had:

- Louis
- Charles Amadeus, married Elisabeth of Bourbon-Vendome
- Henri, Archbishop of Reims, married Marie d'Orleans

== Sources ==
- Coester, Christiane (2007). Schön wie Venus, mutig wie Mars: Anna d'Este, Herzogin von Guise und von Nemours (1531-1607) (in German). R. Oldenbourg Verlag.
- Le Person, Xavier (1999). Journal d'un ligueur parisien des barricades à la levée du siège de Paris par Henri IV, 1588-1590 (in French). Librairie Droz S.A. ISBN 978-2-600-00363-6.
- Oresko, Robert (2004). "Maria Giovanna Basttista of Savoy-Nemours (1644-1724): Daughter, Consort, and Regent of Savoy". In Orr, Clarissa Campbell (ed.). Queenship in Europe 1660-1815: The Role of the Consort. Cambridge University Press. ISBN 9780521814225.

French nobility
Preceded by Charles Emmanuel	Duke of Nemours; 1595–1632	Succeeded by Louis of Savoy
