= Débats-Rivière-d'Orpra =

- Part of Solore-en-Forez
- Coat of arms
- Location of Débats-Rivière-d'Orpra
- Location within France Location within Auvergne-Rhône-Alpes
- Coordinates: 45°45′39″N 3°56′22″E
- Country: France
- Region: Auvergne-Rhône-Alpes
- Department: Loire
- Arrondissement: Montbrison
- Canton: Boën-sur-Lignon
- Commune: Solore-en-Forez
- Area^{1}: 3.41 km^{2} (1.32 sq mi)
- Elevation: 425 m (1,394 ft)
- Highest elevation: 680 m (2,230 ft)
- Lowest elevation: 402 m (1,319 ft)
- Population (2023): 159
  - Density: 46.6/km^{2} (121/sq mi)
- Time zone: UTC+01:00 (CET)
  - Summer (DST): UTC+02:00 (CEST)
- Postal code: 42130
- ^{1} French Land Register data, which excludes lakes, ponds, glaciers > 1 km^{2} (0.386 sq mi or 247 acres) and river estuaries.

Débats-Rivière-d'Orpra is a former commune in the Loire department in central France. On 1 January 2025, it was merged into the new commune of Solore-en-Forez.

== See also ==
- Communes of the Loire department
