= Prince of Orléans-Braganza =

Prince of Orléans-Bragança is a noble title informally attributed to all direct and legitimate agnatic descendants of Louis Philippe Gaston de Orléans, count d'Eu and Imperial Prince Consort of Brazil, as consort of the last Imperial Princess of Brazil, Isabel of Braganza.

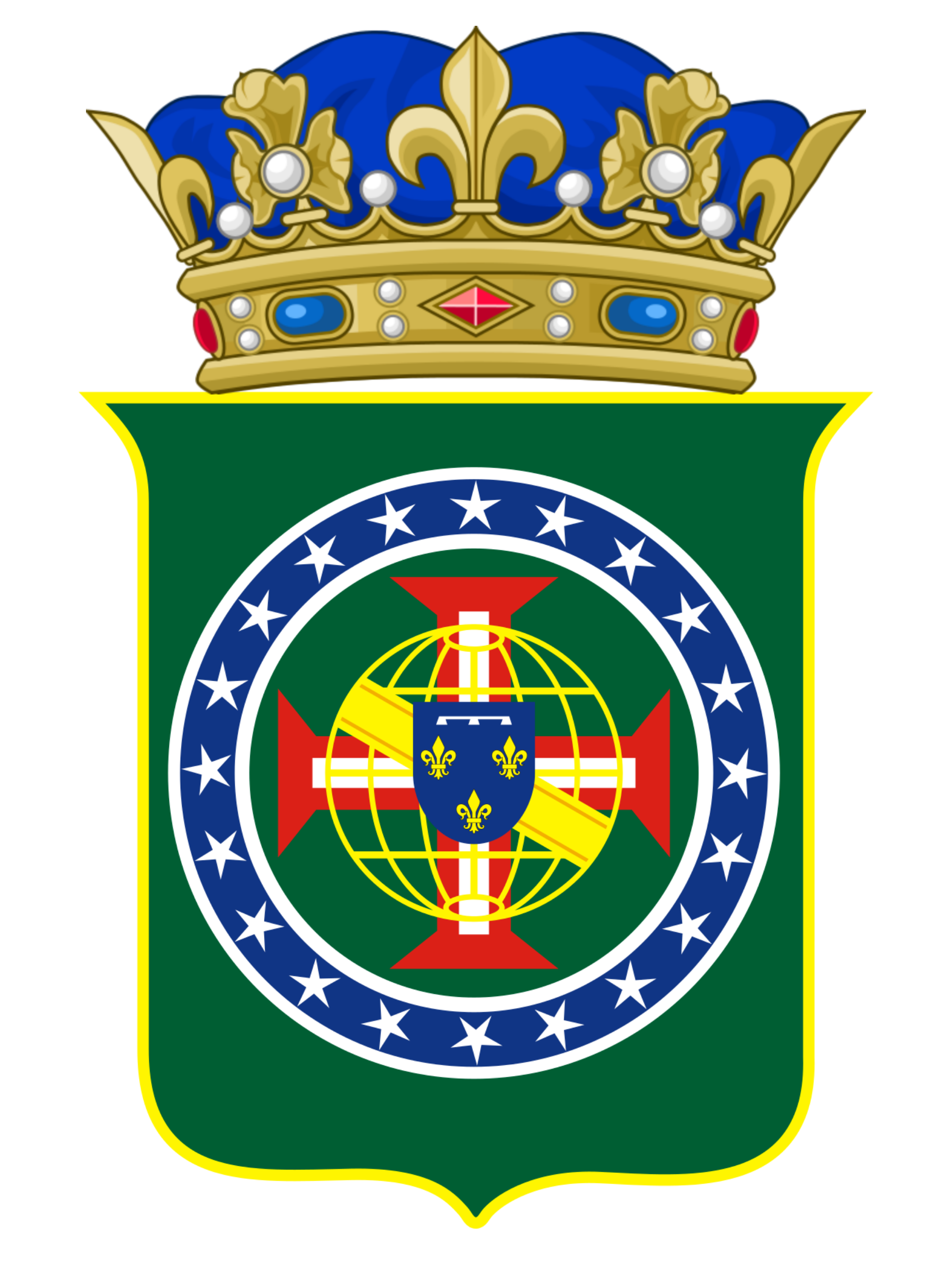
Coat of arms of the Princes of Orléans-Bragança, being composed of the coat of arms of the Imperial House of Brazil as background and main, and the coat of arms of the House of Orléans in blue, in the middle of the coat of arms, and the crown of blood prince of France.

The Royal House of France, of which the Count d'Eu was a member by birth until he renounced his French dynastic rights in 1864 after marrying Isabel de Braganza, Imperial Princess of Brazil, specified that the title Prince of Orléans-Braganza was not part of the noble titles of French royalty but recognized, informally, as the monarchy had been abolished in France since 1848, along with all noble titles, and as a non-reigning house it did not possess any powers for formal recognition - such a title as part of a house distinct from the Royal House of France (the House of Orléans), as well as that the princes of Orléans-Braganza would have the same honours as the princes of the Royal House of France and be addressed as "Royal Highness".

== Origins ==
When Gaston de Orléans, Count d'Eu, married Isabel de Bragança in 1864, he did not want to preserve his French dynastic rights, and therefore his place and his descendants' place in the line of Orleanist succession to the French throne, against the express will of his father. As a result, years after the proclamation of the Brazilian Republic and, consequently, the extinction of the Empire of Brazil, Gastão de Orléans tried to recover his place and that of his descendants in the French line of succession, as well as he sought the creation of the title of Prince of Orléans-Bragança - as a title of French royalty - obtaining several negative answers from the Royal House of France, which by then no longer reigned in the country. A dynastic pact was then made between the Count d'Eu and the Royal House of France, the so-called Brussels Declaration or Pact of Brussels, in which the Royal House of France recognized the title of Prince of Orléans-Braganza as part of a house distinct from the House of Orléans, which made up the Royal House of France; and that the Count d'Eu and his descendants would have the same honours as the princes of the Royal House of France. In the agreement, it was also established that the Count d'Eu and his descendants could only claim the French throne if all the branches of the Royal House of France were extinct.

Gaston de Orléans, Count d'Eu, was the first-born son of Louis Charles Philippe Raphaël de Orléans, Duke of Nemours, who in turn was the second son of Louis Philippe, Duke of Orléans and King of the French from 1830 to 1848, when he was deposed by the Revolution of 1848. Despite the fact that the throne passed to Napoleon III after the end of the second French republic, Orléans began to defend the right of succession of the House of Orléans to the throne. Although Gaston de Orléans' father belonged to the second line of succession of the Orléans to the throne, they retained among themselves the title of Royal Highness, a title that would have been transmitted to the descendants of the Count d'Eu through the title of Prince of Orléans-Braganza.

The title, however, had a pragmatic character. It was imminent that Pedro de Alcântara of Orléans-Braganza, Prince of Grão-Pará, renounced his rights of succession to the Brazilian imperial throne in order to marry Countess Elisabeth Dobrzensky of Dobrzenicz, as her family was considered minor nobility. Her grandfather, Jan Josef II, had been the first to receive the noble title of Count of Dobrzenicz, and his antecedents had by then been barons. The very title that Elizabeth of Dobrzenicz used was a courtesy title, since only males inherited the county. The marriage did take place, however, in 1910.

Peter of Alcantara's father, the Count d'Eu, then sought to formalise the dynastic rights of the House of Orléans to his descendants in order to guarantee, in the face of the Royalists, the so-called egalité de naissance: the equality of birth between the children of Peter of Alcantara and any other dynast. This formalisation took place with the so-called Brussels Declaration, or Brussels Pact, of 26 April 1909, signed by several Orleanist dynasts, in addition to Louis Philippe Robert, Duke of Orléans and then head of the House of Orléans, Gaston of Orléans and his three sons: Pedro de Alcântara, Louis Marie Philippe and Antônio Gastão.

Thus, although the descendants of Pedro de Alcântara, who constitute the so-called Petrópolis branch, did not retain the title of princes of Brazil, they retained in the eyes of the monarchists the status of dynasties, which guaranteed the possibility of marriage between them and other representatives of royal houses without the need of being morganatic. And so it was with Maria Francisca, married to Duarte Nuno, Duke of Braganza, with Isabella Maria, married to Henri of Orléans, Count of Paris, with Peter Gaston, married to the Infanta María de la Esperanza of Bourbon, Princess of the Two Sicilies, with Maria da Gloria, married to Alexander Karađorđević, Prince of Yugoslavia, and with Maria Cristina, married to Jan Pavel, Prince of Sapieha-Rozanski.

The title has no legal or political validity today since the fall of the monarchy in 1889 brought the monarchical period to an end and the Republic began. The Constitution of 1891 expressly extinguished all noble titles until then existing in the country, and subsequent constitutions, as well as the current one in force, of 1988, do not recognise or even mention any validity of the old title.

== Titular Princes of Orléans-Braganza ==
It is accepted among Brazilian monarchists that the head of the Princely House of Orléans-Bragança is still the first-born male directly descending from Pedro de Alcântara, thus figuring among the members of the Petrópolis branch, even if the pretended title also extends to the Vassouras branch.

It was agreed, however, that even then the head of the Princely House below the head of the Brazilian Imperial House in command of the dynasty. Until recently, the symbol of headship was the golden feather used by the Imperial Princess Isabel, to sign the Golden Law, which was always passed to the first-born son, having been sold to the Imperial Museum (installed in the former summer palace of the imperial family, in Petrópolis, in the mountains of Rio de Janeiro) by the Prince Pedro Carlos of Orléans-Braganza, in 2006, for the sum of R$ 500,000.00 (five hundred thousand reais).

=== Current claimants ===
==== Vassouras Branch ====
- Prince Pedro Henrique of Orléans-Braganza (1921–1981): Born in 1909, died in 1981. Grandson of Princess Isabel, son and heir of her second son, Prince Luís of Orléans-Braganza (1878–1920).
- Prince Luiz of Orléans-Braganza (1981–2022): Born in 1938, died in 2022, the eldest son of Prince Pedro Henrique
- Prince Bertrand of Orléans-Braganza (2022–present): born in 1941, Third son of Prince Pedro Henrique
  - Heir: Prince Antônio of Orléans-Braganza (1950–2024)

==== Petrópolis Branch ====
- Prince Pedro Gastão of Orléans-Braganza (1940–2007): Born in 1913, son of Isabel's eldest son, who had renounced all rights to the Brazilian throne for himself and his descendants. The validity of the renunciation was disputed by Pedro Gastão.
- Prince Pedro Carlos of Orléans-Braganza (2007 – present): eldest son of Pedro Gastão. He doesn't put in question the validity of the renunciation. Contrariwise, he declared himself a republican.
  - Heir: Prince Pedro Thiago of Orléans-Braganza (born in 1979)

== Background ==
When Louis Gaston of Orléans, Count d'Eu, left for the Empire of Brazil in company with his cousin, Prince Ludwig August of Saxe-Coburg and Gotha, to marry one of the two daughters of Emperor Dom Pedro II of Brazil, he received a suggestion from his father to make a declaration reserving his rights as a French dynast because he was the grandson of Louis Philippe I, King of France. He was also asked to make a declaration reserving his rights as a French dynast, because he was the grandson of Louis Philip I, King of France.

However, a few months after his landing in Rio de Janeiro, on 2 September 1864, Gaston disregarded his father's suggestion, stating in a letter dated 7 December 1864 that he had renounced his right to be in the line of Orleanist succession to the defunct royal throne of France and, consequently, the position of French dynast.

Gaston had been exiled from his homeland since the age of five and would only return to France as an adult, married to Isabel of Braganza, Princess Imperial of Brazil, and with two small children, in 1878.

In the decades he remained in Brazil, including when he visited France in 1878 and then when he resided there with his family from 1881 for three and a half years, at no time did he seek to regain his former position in the Royal House of France. The Count would change his position only after the fall of the Brazilian monarchy through the military coup of 15 November 1889.

=== The position of the Count of Paris in 1901 ===
Philippe of Orléans, Count of Paris and then head of the Royal House of France, wrote a letter dated 15 September 1893 to Ferdinand de Orléans, Duke of Alençon, younger brother of Gaston de Orléans, Count d'Eu, in which he revealed his opinion on the matter:

"My dear Alençon, [...] Gaston's possible claims to claim his position in the House of France and everything else related are absolutely unacceptable. You saw in my letter that I didn't even imagine that such rights even existed. When one leaves the House of France to become a foreigner, when one renounces a life of exile in expectation, hope and remaining sincere about France, in order to seek an official position on a foreign throne, such an act has irrevocable consequences... ...He cannot, thirty years later, say that he made a mistake, that the past does not exist, and claim among us a position which he intentionally left. Naturalisation in Brazil excluded him permanently from the House of France just as it excluded our uncle Montpensier and his male children. It is the fundamental law of heredity of the Capetingio branch, which in turn ascended the throne by virtue of that law. The law must be irrevocable, if not, it would be enough for one of these excluded persons to naturalize himself to get ahead of all the rest who have enjoyed the rights acquired in the meantime.''

However, the Count d'Eu insisted on the matter after the death of the Count of Paris, his cousin, and received a letter dated 15 July 1901 from Philippe, Duke of Orléans, his son and heir:

"For any sovereign family, fidelity to traditional rules is an indispensable condition of existence.

This fidelity is the only security of destitute sovereign families. Without it, there would only be whims and arbitrariness, with all the consequences: usurpation, violation of the rights of others, discord and ruin. In the House of France, the traditional rule that decides who has royal status also preserves the rights of younger princes.

This law exists independently of the king's will and it is not up to him to create or modify it. But it may become necessary in some cases to expose this rule, to declare it when questioned, to preserve its application, to maintain it and to defend it when it is attacked.

Leaving these principles firm, and basing myself on the fundamental law of the French monarchy in virtue of which the dynastic claim belongs to me, and by what circumstances make it my duty, I declare the following:

The Lord Count d'Eu, by having taken Brazil as his residence without intending to return in 1864, by the commitments which bound him to the Brazilian crown, by the formal renunciation of his succession rights as to the crown of France, by his adoption of the Brazilian nationality, has lost his rights to the succession to the crown of France and his status as a member of the Royal Family of France. The sons of the Count d'Eu, born Brazilian of Brazilian parents and Brazilian dynasties, were never princes of the House of France, a status only granted by birth and that can be lost but not gained. Therefore, they cannot become princes of the House of France, nor can their father recover his status, which he lost."

== The Pact of Brussels ==
In 1909, members of the House of Orléans and the House of Orléans-Bragança signed a dynastic pact, known as the Pact of Brussels or Brussels Declaration, the Duke of Orléans being present. The treaty created the title of Prince of Orléans and Braganza for the Count d'Eu and his descendants, thus maintaining the princely status of his house, although this is considered a house distinct from the Royal House of France, and the Count d'Eu did not in fact recover his former position in the Orleanist line of succession to the French throne. The main items of the treaty are:

We declare that:

1º. Our dearest Uncle the Count d'Eu, acknowledged in the Note he sent us both, that his three sons, coming from his marriage celebrated in 1864, with the Imperial Princess Isabel, then immediate Heiress to the Throne of Brazil, are members of the Imperial House of Brazil and that they and their descendants constitute a House distinct from the House of Orléans, which composed the House of France. He asks us to recognize in France, to these Princes and to their descendants, male, princely and legitimate, the Honours of the Princes of the House of France.

It was represented to us, on the other hand, to motivate such request, that a feminine succession, admitted in Brazil, could make the Crown of Brazil leave the masculine descent of the Count d'Eu and affect very much the said descent of the access to the Brazilian Crown, so that the quality of Brazilian Princes would not be recognized to them anymore and that they would lose all princely quality.

Wishing to prevent such a possibility for Princes so recently and manfully originated from Our House.

Wishing also to assure, as far as we can, both the princely quality and the honours of Princes of the House of France.

Wanting equally - and this pleases Us - to give them, as well as our most dear Uncle, the Count d'Eu, a pledge of Our affection as a good and close relative, and a testimony of Our confidence in the loyalty of the commitments which they solemnly assume here and to which is attached what We have granted them.

We recognize to the Count d'Eu, his three sons and their male descendants, princely and legitimate, besides the titles of Imperial Highnesses or Highnesses which belong to them by right, the title of Royal Highnesses.

We recognize to the three children of the Count d'Eu and their male, princely and legitimate descendants the titles of Princes and Princesses of Orléans and Bragança.

2º. We recognize, according to the request made to Us by the Count d'Eu, the above Princes, sons of the Count d'Eu, presently fit for the Collation of French Princeship Titles, excluding Appanage Titles. This Collation depending however only on Our will and that of Our successors.

3º. We maintain and confirm Our Note of July 15th, in that it notes the order of accession to the Crown and regulates the order and precedence to be observed in all ceremonies having an official, political or French national character. This stated, We willingly consent to the request of Our Uncle, the Count d'Eu, about family reunions, to the effect that when the meeting or ceremony is exclusively family, or else when We decide that order should be taken, not by order of accession to the Crown, but by order of kinship, either in relation to Ourselves or in relation to the princely Persons, living or deceased, whom it is a matter of honouring, the Count d'Eu as well as his descendants, male, princely and legitimate, will be able to take the order that signals this kinship to them, as this has already occurred for other relatives or allies of Our Family, there included not princes and princes of Foreign Sovereign Houses.

4º. The Count d'Eu and his sons solemnly pledge by themselves and by their descendants, not to assert the claim to the Crown of France and to the position of Head of the House of France, except in the case of total extinction of all the French princely branches that currently compose the House of France. We record this solemn undertaking, which shall take effect and be established by the affixing of the signatures of these Princes to our present Declaration.

We declare this commitment as inviolable, as firm and unbreakable as if it were taken with oath before a competent Assembly of the Monarchy.

5º. The Count d'Eu and his sons equally undertake in their name and in the name of their descendants not to contest in anything to the branch of the Duke d'Alençon the possession of the title of Duke of Nemours.

The dynastic pact bears the signatures on the French side of the Duke of Orléans; the Duke of Montpensier; the Duke of Guise, representing his father, the Duke of Chartres; the Duke d'Alençon and his son, the Duke of Vêndome; and the Duke of Penthièvre. And on the Brazilian side, the Count d'Eu and his three sons

The fourth article of the declaration makes it clear that the Brazilian princes and their descendants had committed themselves to claiming the French crown only after the extinction of the branches that were part of the Royal House of France. If the Orléans and Bragança were, in fact, in the line of Orleanian succession to the French throne, it would not make sense for the Brazilian princes to be behind all the other French princes, even more so because there were younger branches than the French-Brazilian. For instance, there were the descendants of the younger brother of the Count d'Eu, the Duke of Alençon and also Pierre of Orléans, Duke of Penthièvre (son of Francis Ferdinand of Orléans, Prince of Joinville, younger brother of the Count d'Eu's father), who although not married, was alive when the declaration was signed.

Thus, strictly speaking, the Orléans and Braganza are not in the Orleanist line of succession to the French throne. What the Brussels Declaration provides for is only an undertaking by the descendants of the Count d'Eu not to claim the throne of France until the whole line of succession is over, and nothing about any guaranteed right of the Orléans-Braganza in the eventual case of the dynasty ending, where there is no new dynasty defined a priori. It is somewhat similar to what occurs in many monarchical countries, which provide for the creation of a new dynasty when the reigning dynasty is over - for example, the Brazilian imperial constitution of 1824 - the first constitutional charter of Brazil, provided that the General Assembly would choose a new dynasty when no legitimate descendants of Pedro I remained.

According to Isabel of Orléans-Bragança, Countess of Paris, daughter of Pedro de Alcântara and granddaughter of the Count d'Eu, her grandfather's real desire was in fact to keep her father in France so that a branch of the House of Orléans would emerge from his person - the "Orléans-Eu" - since he had renounced his position as heir to the imperial crown of Brazil in 1908. The Count d'Eu's wish would be frustrated after his death, since his eldest son, Pedro de Alcântara, travelled to Brazil with the intention of taking up residence, after the revocation of the Banishment Law in 1920, during the government of the then President of the Republic of the United States of Brazil, Epitácio Pessoa.
