= Chabanière =

- Commune
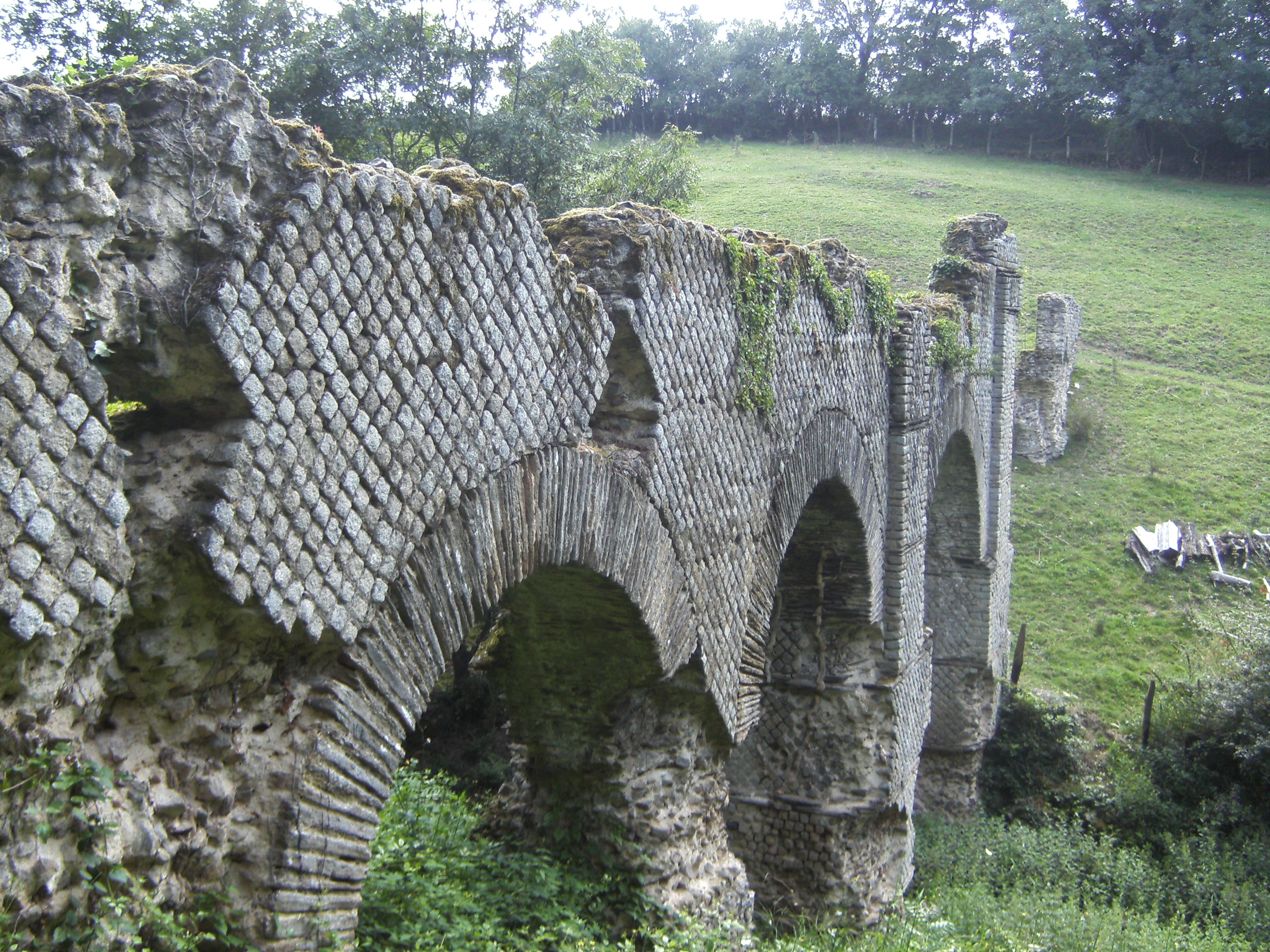
- The Gier-Saint Maurice aqueduct
- Location of Chabanière
- Location within France Location within Auvergne-Rhône-Alpes
- Coordinates: 45°34′59″N 4°37′55″E
- Country: France
- Region: Auvergne-Rhône-Alpes
- Department: Rhône
- Arrondissement: Lyon
- Canton: Mornant
- Intercommunality: pays Mornantais

Government
  - Mayor (2021–2026): Jean-Pierre Cid
- Area^{1}: 34.87 km^{2} (13.46 sq mi)
- Population (2023): 4,323
  - Density: 124.0/km^{2} (321.1/sq mi)
- Time zone: UTC+01:00 (CET)
  - Summer (DST): UTC+02:00 (CEST)
- INSEE/Postal code: 69228 /69440
- ^{1} French Land Register data, which excludes lakes, ponds, glaciers > 1 km^{2} (0.386 sq mi or 247 acres) and river estuaries.

Chabanière (French pronunciation: [ʃabanjɛʁ]) is a commune in the department of Rhône, eastern France. The municipality was established on 1 January 2017 by merger of the former communes of Saint-Maurice-sur-Dargoire (the seat), Saint-Didier-sous-Riverie and Saint-Sorlin.

== Population ==
Population data refer to the area corresponding with the commune as of January 2025.

Historical population
Year	Pop.	±% p.a.
1968	2,169	—
1975	2,181	+0.08%
1982	2,654	+2.84%
1990	3,466	+3.39%
1999	3,935	+1.42%
2007	4,050	+0.36%
2012	4,042	−0.04%
2017	4,183	+0.69%
2023	4,323	+0.55%
Source: INSEE

== See also ==
- Communes of the Rhône department
