= Saint-Privat-d'Allier =

- Commune
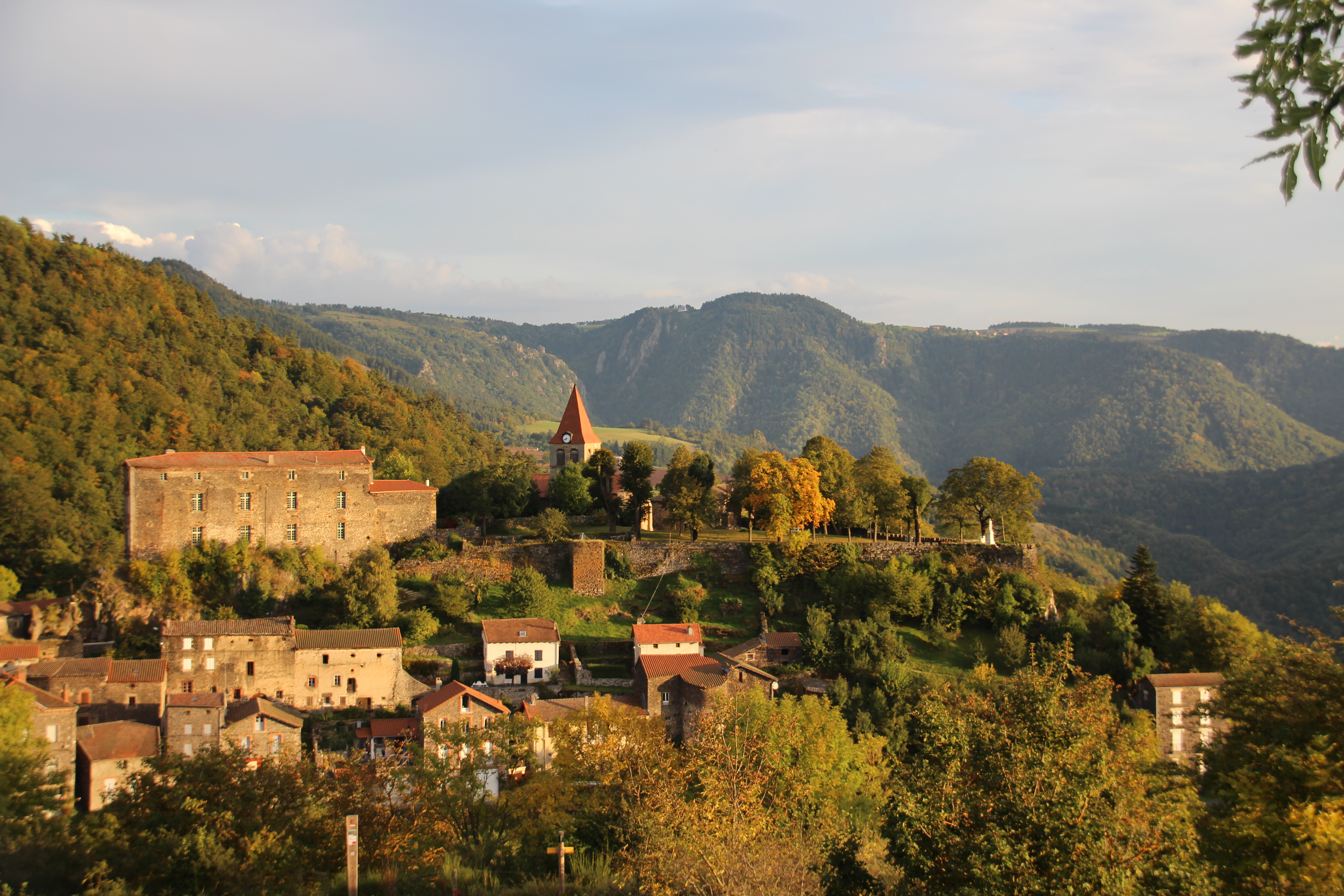
- Location of Saint-Privat-d'Allier
- Location within France Location within Auvergne-Rhône-Alpes
- Coordinates: 44°59′27″N 3°40′47″E
- Country: France
- Region: Auvergne-Rhône-Alpes
- Department: Haute-Loire
- Arrondissement: Le Puy-en-Velay
- Canton: Saint-Paulien
- Intercommunality: CA du Puy-en-Velay

Government
  - Mayor (2020–2026): Guy Eyraud
- Area^{1}: 37.67 km^{2} (14.54 sq mi)
- Elevation: 875 m (2,871 ft)
- Highest elevation: 1,221 m (4,006 ft)
- Lowest elevation: 547 m (1,795 ft)
- Population (2023): 394
  - Density: 10.5/km^{2} (27.1/sq mi)
- Time zone: UTC+01:00 (CET)
  - Summer (DST): UTC+02:00 (CEST)
- INSEE/Postal code: 43221 /43580
- ^{1} French Land Register data, which excludes lakes, ponds, glaciers > 1 km^{2} (0.386 sq mi or 247 acres) and river estuaries.

Saint-Privat-d'Allier (French pronunciation: [sɛ̃ pʁiva dalje], literally Saint-Privat of Allier; Occitan: Sent Privat d'Alèir) is a commune in the Haute-Loire department in south-central France. On 1 January 2017, the former commune of Saint-Didier-d'Allier was merged into Saint-Privat-d'Allier.

== Population ==
Historical population
Year	Pop.	±% p.a.
1968	808	—
1975	649	−3.08%
1982	605	−1.00%
1990	479	−2.88%
1999	457	−0.52%
2007	445	−0.33%
2012	427	−0.82%
2017	398	−1.40%
2023	394	−0.17%
Source: INSEE

These population data refer to the area corresponding with the commune as of January 2025.

== See also ==
- Communes of the Haute-Loire department
