= Saint-Didier-sur-Rochefort =

- Part of La Côte-Saint-Didier
- Location of Saint-Didier-sur-Rochefort
- Location within France Location within Auvergne-Rhône-Alpes
- Coordinates: 45°47′39″N 3°50′45″E
- Country: France
- Region: Auvergne-Rhône-Alpes
- Department: Loire
- Arrondissement: Montbrison
- Canton: Boën-sur-Lignon
- Commune: La Côte-Saint-Didier
- Area^{1}: 22.75 km^{2} (8.78 sq mi)
- Elevation: 705 m (2,313 ft)
- Highest elevation: 900 m (3,000 ft)
- Lowest elevation: 457 m (1,499 ft)
- Population (2022): 457
  - Density: 20.1/km^{2} (52.0/sq mi)
- Time zone: UTC+01:00 (CET)
  - Summer (DST): UTC+02:00 (CEST)
- Postal code: 42111
- ^{1} French Land Register data, which excludes lakes, ponds, glaciers > 1 km^{2} (0.386 sq mi or 247 acres) and river estuaries.

Saint-Didier-sur-Rochefort (French pronunciation: [sɛ̃ didje syʁ ʁɔʃfɔʁ], literally Saint-Didier on Rochefort) is a former commune in the Loire department in central France. On 1 January 2025, it was merged into the new commune of La Côte-Saint-Didier.

== Population ==
Historical population
Year	Pop.	±% p.a.
1968	672	—
1975	552	−2.77%
1982	476	−2.09%
1990	428	−1.32%
1999	407	−0.56%
2009	422	+0.36%
2014	403	−0.92%
2020	456	+2.08%
Source: INSEE

== See also ==
- Communes of the Loire department
