= Charles Amadeus, Duke of Nemours =

French military leader (1624–1652)

Charles Amadeus
- Duke of Nemours
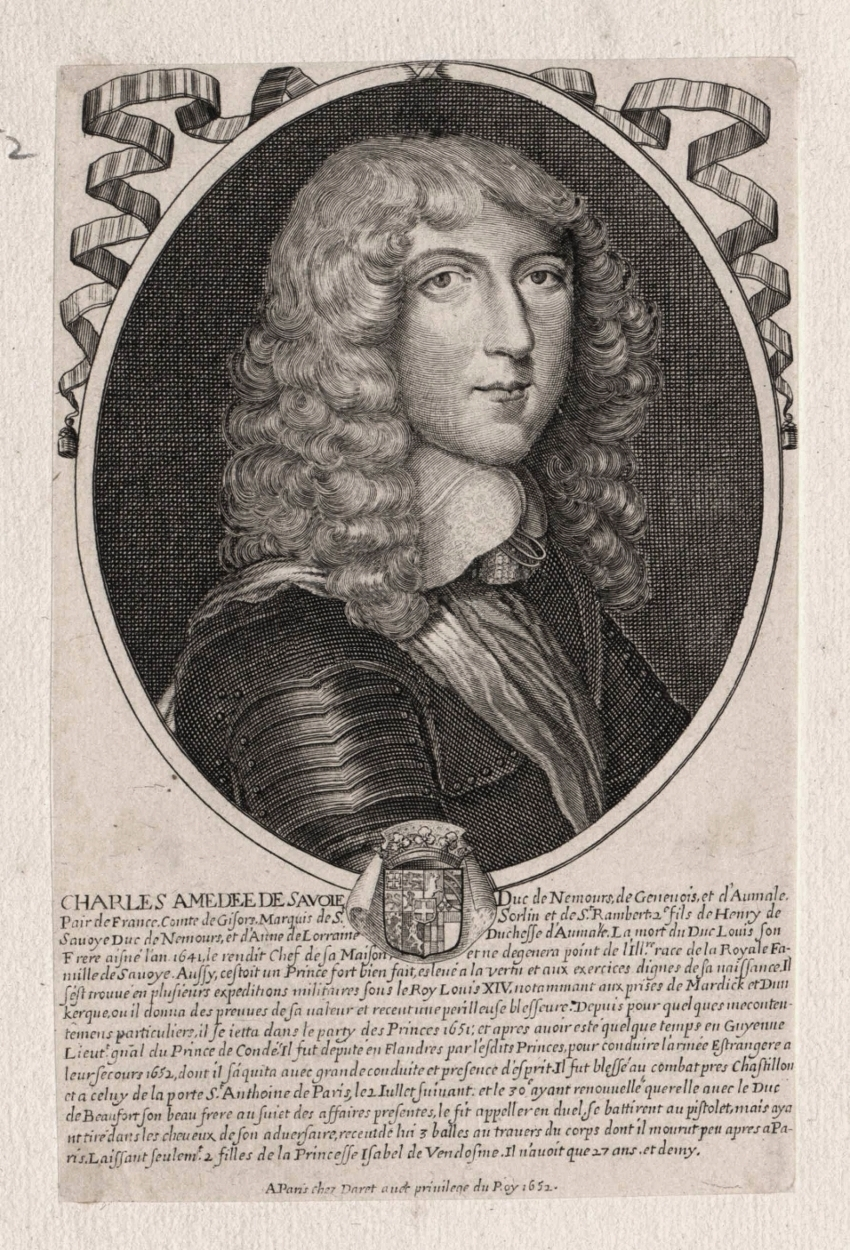
- Born: 12 April 1624; Paris, France
- Died: 30 July 1652 (aged 28); Paris, France
- Burial: Notre Dame d'Annecy, Annecy
- Spouse: Élisabeth de Bourbon
- Issue: Marie Jeanne, Duchess of Savoy; Marie Françoise, Queen of Portugal
- House: Savoy (Nemours branch)
- Father: Henri of Savoy, Duc de Nemours
- Mother: Anne of Lorraine

Charles Amadeus of Savoy (French: Charles-Amédée de Savoie, French pronunciation: [ʃaʁl amede də savwa]), Duke of Nemours (12 April 1624 – 30 July 1652) was a French military leader and magnate. He was the father of the penultimate Duchess of Savoy and of a Queen of Portugal.

== Biography ==
He was the son of Henri of Savoy, 3rd Duke of Nemours (1572-1632) and Anne of Lorraine and the younger brother of Louis of Savoy, who died in 1641.

Charles Amadeus served in the Army of Flanders in 1645, and in the following year commanded the light cavalry at the siege of Kortrijk. In 1652 he took part in the war of the Fronde, and fought at Bleneau and at the Faubourg St Antoine, where he was wounded.

On 11 July 1643 he married, at the Louvre, Élisabeth de Bourbon, Mademoiselle de Vendôme, the daughter of César, Duke of Vendôme, the legitimised son of King Henry IV of France by his mistress, Gabrielle d'Estrées. Her mother was the wealthy heiress, Françoise de Lorraine (1592–1669), the daughter of Philippe Emmanuel, Duke of Mercœur.

Charles Amadeus had several children: two daughters, three sons and a stillborn child of unrecorded gender. Only his two daughters survived him;

- Marie Jeanne Baptiste of Savoy, Mademoiselle de Nemours (1644–1724), who married Charles Emmanuel II, Duke of Savoy, in 1665, and had issue;
- Stillborn child
- Marie Françoise Élisabeth of Savoy, Mademoiselle d'Aumale (1646–1683), who married king Alphonso VI of Portugal, in 1666 and afterwards Alphonso's younger brother, Pedro, Duke of Beja, regent of Portugal, and had issue.
- Joseph of Savoy (1649–1649)
- Francis of Savoy (1650–1650)
- Charles Amadeus of Savoy (1651–1651)

Charles Amadeus was killed by his brother-in-law, François de Bourbon, Duke of Beaufort in a duel in 1652. He was buried at the Notre Dame d'Annecy in Annecy, the capital of the Genevois, of which the Dukes of Nemours were also counts. Charles Amadeus' brother Henri, who had been archbishop of Reims, withdrew from orders in order to succeed him in the title of Duke of Nemours.

== Ancestry ==
Ancestors of Charles Amadeus, Duke of Nemours

16. Philip II, Duke of Savoy
8. Philippe of Savoy, Duke of Nemours
17. Claudine de Brosse
4. Jacques of Savoy, Duke of Nemours
18. Louis I, Duke of Longueville
9. Charlotte d'Orléans-Longueville
19. Johanna of Hachberg-Sausenberg
2. Henri of Savoy, Duke of Nemours
20. Alfonso I d'Este, Duke of Ferrara
10. Ercole II d'Este, Duke of Ferrara
21. Lucrezia Borgia
5. Anna d'Este
22. Louis XII of France
11. Princess Renée of France
23. Anne, Duchess of Brittany
1. Charles Amadeus of Savoy, Duke of Nemours
24. Claude, Duke of Guise (= 28)
12. Claude de Lorraine-Guise, Duke of Aumale
25. Antoinette of Bourbon (= 29)
6. Charles de Lorraine, Duke of Aumale
26. Louis de Brézé
13. Louise de Brézé
27. Diane de Poitiers
3. Anne de Lorraine-Aumale
28. Claude, Duke of Guise (= 24)
14. René de Lorraine, Marquis of Elbeuf
29. Antoinette of Bourbon (= 25)
7. Marie de Lorraine-Elbeuf
30. Claude de Rieux
15. Louise de Rieux
31. Suzanne Léonie de Bourbon-Montpensier

== Sources ==
- Oresko, Robert (2004). "Maria Giovanna Battista of Savoy (1644-1724): daughter, consort, and Regent of Savoy". In Campbell Orr, Clarissa (ed.). Queenship in Europe 1660-1815: The Role of the Consort. Cambridge University Press. pp. 16–55. ISBN 0-521-81422-7.

French nobility
Preceded by Louis of Savoy	Duke of Nemours; 1641–1652	Succeeded by Henri of Savoy
