= Solore-en-Forez =

- Commune
- Location of Solore-en-Forez
- Location within France Location within Auvergne-Rhône-Alpes
- Coordinates: 45°45′39″N 3°56′22″E
- Country: France
- Region: Auvergne-Rhône-Alpes
- Department: Loire
- Arrondissement: Montbrison
- Canton: Boën-sur-Lignon
- Intercommunality: CA Loire Forez

Government
  - Mayor (2025–2026): Dominique Guillin
- Area^{1}: 20.16 km^{2} (7.78 sq mi)
- Highest elevation: 895 m (2,936 ft)
- Lowest elevation: 402 m (1,319 ft)
- Population (2023): 507
  - Density: 25.1/km^{2} (65.1/sq mi)
- Time zone: UTC+01:00 (CET)
  - Summer (DST): UTC+02:00 (CEST)
- INSEE/Postal code: 42084 /42130
- ^{1} French Land Register data, which excludes lakes, ponds, glaciers > 1 km^{2} (0.386 sq mi or 247 acres) and river estuaries.

Solore-en-Forez (French pronunciation: [sɔlɔʁ ɑ̃ fɔʁɛ], lit. 'Solore in Forez') is a commune in the Loire department in central France. It was formed on 1 January 2025, with the merger of Débats-Rivière-d'Orpra, Saint-Laurent-Rochefort and L'Hôpital-sous-Rochefort.

== See also ==
- Communes of the Loire department
