= Saint-Maurice-sur-Dargoire =

- Part of Chabanière
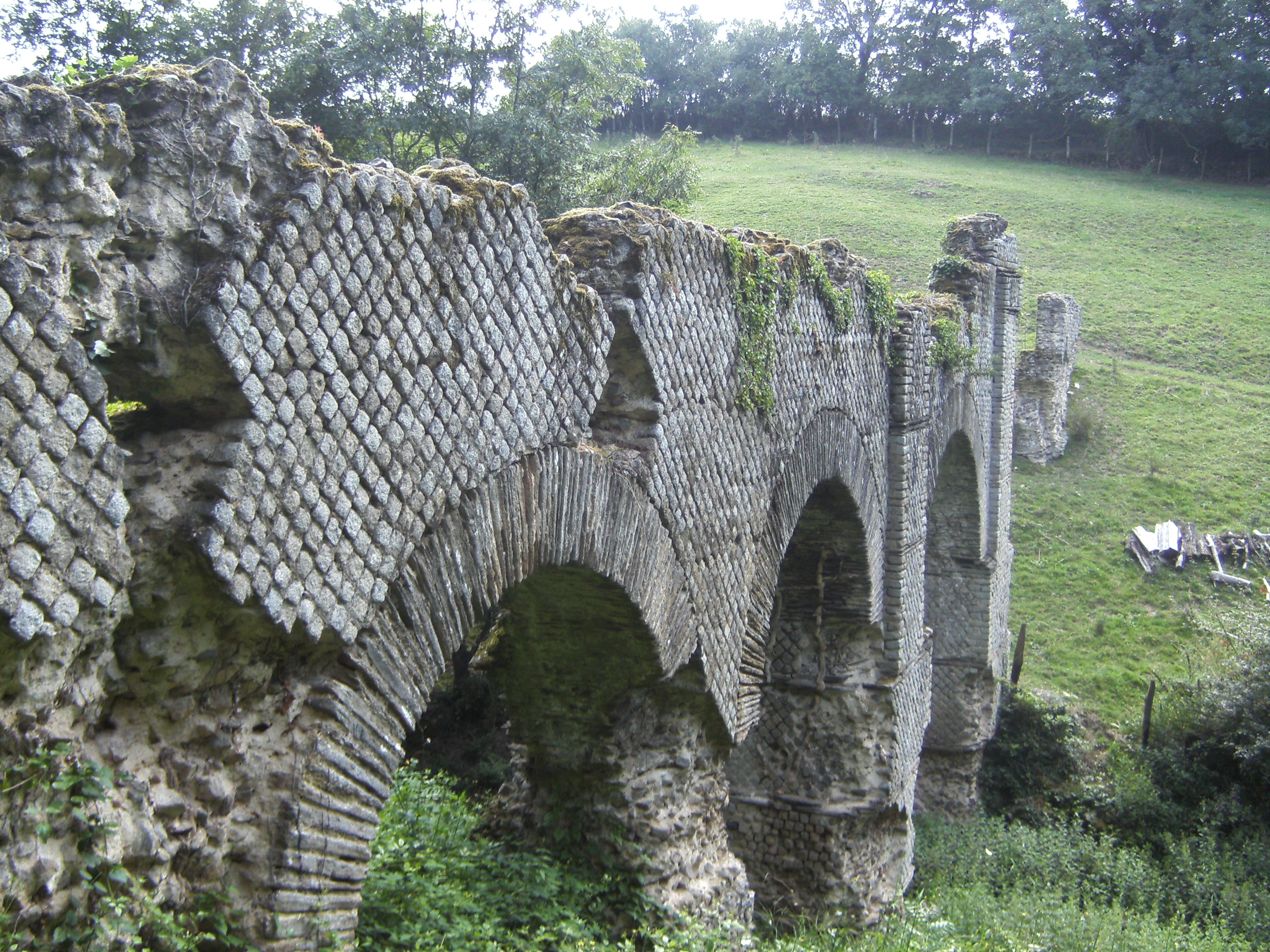
- Roman Aqueduct of the Gier: The Bridge of Granges

- Coat of arms
- Location of Saint-Maurice-sur-Dargoire
- Location within France Location within Auvergne-Rhône-Alpes
- Coordinates: 45°34′59″N 4°37′55″E
- Country: France
- Region: Auvergne-Rhône-Alpes
- Department: Rhône
- Arrondissement: Lyon
- Canton: Mornant
- Commune: Chabanière
- Area^{1}: 16.27 km^{2} (6.28 sq mi)
- Elevation: 463 m (1,519 ft)
- Highest elevation: 535 m (1,755 ft)
- Lowest elevation: 204 m (669 ft)
- Population (2022): 2,416
  - Density: 148.5/km^{2} (384.6/sq mi)
- Time zone: UTC+01:00 (CET)
  - Summer (DST): UTC+02:00 (CEST)
- Postal code: 69440
- ^{1} French Land Register data, which excludes lakes, ponds, glaciers > 1 km^{2} (0.386 sq mi or 247 acres) and river estuaries.

Saint-Maurice-sur-Dargoire (French pronunciation: [sɛ̃ mɔʁis syʁ daʁɡwaʁ]; literally "Saint-Maurice on Dargoire") is a former commune in the Rhône department in eastern France. On 1 January 2017, it was merged into the new commune Chabanière.

== See also ==
- Communes of the Rhône department
