= Duke of Nemours =

Title in the Peerage of France

Duke of Nemours was a title in the Peerage of France. The name refers to Nemours in the Île-de-France region of north-central France.

== History ==
In the 12th and 13th centuries, the Lordship of Nemours, in the Gâtinais, France, was a possession of the house of Villebéon, a member of which, Gautier, was marshal of France in the middle of the 13th century. The lordship was sold to King Philip III of France in 1274 and 1276 by Jean and Philippe de Nemours. It was then made a county and given in 1364 to Jean III de Grailly, captal de Buch.

In 1404, Charles VI of France gave it to Charles III of Navarre and elevated it into a duchy in the peerage of France, in exchange to his ancestral county of Évreux in Normandy.

After being confiscated and restored several times, the duchy reverted to the French crown in 1504, after the extinction of the house of Armagnac-Pardiac. In 1507, it was given by Louis XII to his nephew, Gaston de Foix, who was killed at the Battle of Ravenna in 1512.

The duchy then returned to the royal domain and was detached from it successively for Giuliano de Medici and his wife Philiberta of Savoy in 1515, for Louise of Savoy in 1524, and for Philip of Savoy, Count of Genevois, in 1528. The descendants of Philip of Savoy held the duchy until its sale to Louis XIV of France.

In 1672, Louis XIV gave it to his brother Philippe de France, Duke of Orléans, whose descendants held it until the French Revolution. It was one of the many subsidiary titles held by the House of Orléans. The title of Duke of Nemours was afterwards given to Louis Charles d'Orléans, the second son of King Louis Philippe I of the French.

== List of lords ==
House of Château-Landon

- Orson (1120–1148)
- Aveline (1148–1174), died 1196

Aveline married Walter of Villebéon, lord of Beaumont-du-Gâtinais, in 1150 and shared the lordship with him. They left it to their son in 1174.

House of Villebéon

- Walter I [Gautier I] (1150–1174), died 1205
- Philip I [Philippe I] (1174–1191)
- Walter II [Gautier II] (1191–1222)
- Philip II [Philippe II] (1222–1255)
- Walter III [Gautier III] (1255–1270)
- Philip III [Philippe III] (1270–1274)

The lordship was sold to the king in 1274.

== List of dukes ==
=== House of Évreux (1404–1504) ===
- Charles d'Évreux (1361–1425), also King Charles III of Navarre

After the death of Charles III in 1425, the Duchy was claimed by the descendants of both his younger daughter, Beatrice, and his elder daughter and heiress, Blanche I of Navarre. Louis XI settled the claim on Jacques d'Armagnac, grandson of Beatrice, in 1462, though Blanche's descendants, the Kings of Navarre, claimed the title until 1571.

- Éléonore de Bourbon (1425–c.1462)
- Jacques d'Armagnac (1462–1477)

confiscated from Jacques at his execution for treason in 1477, restored to his son Jean in 1484

- Jean d'Armagnac (1484–1500)
- Louis d'Armagnac (1500–1503)
- Marguerite d'Armagnac (1503)
- Charlotte d'Armagnac (1503–1504)

The last descendant of Béatrix d'Évreux, she died without issue.

=== House of Foix (1507–1512) ===
- Gaston of Foix (1507–1512)

=== House of Medici (1515–1524) ===
- Giuliano de' Medici (1515–1516), married to:
- Philiberta of Savoy (1516–1524)

=== House of Savoy (1524–1672) ===
- Louise of Savoy (1524–1531), Duchess of Angoulême, Francis I of France's mother.

She received the duchy of Nemours in 1524 with the duchy of Anjou. It was later transferred to her half-brother in 1528 and she received the duchy of Touraine in exchange. She also received later the Duchy of Auvergne.

- Philippe of Savoy (1528–1533)
- Jacques of Savoy (1531–1585)
- Charles Emmanuel of Savoy (1567–1595)
- Henri I of Savoy (1572–1632)
- Louis I of Savoy (1615–1641)
- Charles Amadeus of Savoy (1624–1652)
- Henri II of Savoy (1625–1659)

=== House of Orléans (1672–1848) ===
- Philippe de France (1640–1701)
- Philippe d'Orléans (1674–1723), Regent of France 1715–1723, son of the above
- Louis d'Orléans, Duke of Orléans (1703–1752), son of the above
- Louis Philippe d'Orléans (1725–1785), son of the above
- Philippe d'Orléans, Philippe Égalité (1747–1793), son of the above
- Louis Philippe d'Orléans (1773–1850), King of the French, 1830–1848, son of the above

=== Titular Dukes of the House of Orléans ===
- Louis Charles d'Orléans (1814–1896), son of the above
- Charles Philippe d'Orléans (1905–1970), great-grandson of the above

=== Potential claimants of the House of Orléans-Braganza ===
In 1909, members of the House of Orléans and the House of Orléans-Braganza signed the Pact of Brussels (also known as the Declaration of Brussels), the Duke of Orléans being present. The dynastic pact created the title of Prince of Orléans-Braganza for the Count d'Eu and his descendants, thus maintaining the princely status of his house, although this is considered a house distinct from the Royal House of France, and the Count d'Eu did not in fact recover his former position in the line of Orleans succession to the French throne.

Under the Pact of Brussels the Count d'Eu and his sons equally undertook in his name and the name of his descendants not to contest in any way to the branch of the Duke d'Alençon the possession of the title of Duke of Nemours.

Nevertheless, Charles Philippe d'Orléans, the last Duke of Nemours and only descendant of the Alençon, died without heirs. His death opened the theoretical possibility for the Head of the House of Orléans-Braganza to claim said title without violating the family pact.

== List of duchesses ==
This is a list of duchesses of Nemours and their original houses.

=== House of Évreux ===
Picture	Name	Father	Birth	Marriage	Became Duchess	Ceased to be Duchess	Death	Spouse
	Eleanor of Castile	Henry II of Castile (Trastamara)	circa 1363	1375		27 February 1416		Charles III of Navarre
	Louise d'Anjou	Charles, Count of Maine (Anjou)	1445	1462		1477		Jacques, Duke of Nemours
	Yolande de La Haye	(La Haye)	unknown	24 April 1492		1500	1517	Jean, Duke of Nemours
Picture	Name	Father	Birth	Marriage	Became Duchess	Ceased to be Duchess	Death	Spouse

=== House of Medici ===
Picture	Name	Father	Birth	Marriage	Became Duchess	Ceased to be Duchess	Death	Spouse
	Philiberta of Savoy	Philip II, Duke of Savoy (Savoy)	1498	25 January 1515		4 April 1524		Giuliano de' Medici
Picture	Name	Father	Birth	Marriage	Became Duchess	Ceased to be Duchess	Death	Spouse

=== House of Savoy ===
Picture	Name	Father	Birth	Marriage	Became Duchess	Ceased to be Duchess	Death	Spouse
	Charlotte d'Orléans	Louis, Duke of Longueville (Orléans)	1 November 1512	8 September 1549		25 November 1533	8 September 1549	Philippe
	Anna d'Este	Ercole II, Duke of Ferrara (Este)	16 November 1531	29 April 1566		15 June 1585	15 May 1607	Jacques
	Anne of Lorraine	Charles, Duke of Aumale (Lorraine)	1600	18 April 1618		10 July 1632	10 February 1638	Henri I
	Élisabeth de Bourbon	César, Duke of Vendôme (Bourbon)	August 1614	11 July 1643		30 July 1652	19 May 1664	Charles Amadeus
	Marie d'Orléans	Henri II, Duke of Longueville (Orléans)	5 March 1625	22 May 1657		14 January 1659	16 June 1707	Henri II
Picture	Name	Father	Birth	Marriage	Became Duchess	Ceased to be Duchess	Death	Spouse

=== House of Orléans ===
Picture	Name	Father	Birth	Marriage	Became Duchess	Ceased to be Duchess	Death	Spouse
	Elizabeth Charlotte, Madame Palatine	Charles I Louis, Elector Palatine (Palatinate)	27 May 1652	16 November 1671	1672 peerage awarded to husband	9 June 1701 husband's death	9 December 1722	Philippe, Duke of Orléans
	Françoise Marie de Bourbon, Légitimée de France	Louis XIV of France (Bourbon (Illegitimate))	25 May 1677	18 February 1692	9 June 1701 husband's accession	2 December 1723 husband's death	1 February 1749	Philippe, Duke of Orléans
	Margravine Johanna of Baden-Baden	Louis William, Margrave of Baden-Baden (Zähringen)	10 November 1704	13 July 1724		8 July 1726		Louis, Duke of Orléans
	Louise Henriette de Bourbon	Louis Armand, Prince of Conti (Bourbon)	20 June 1726	17 December 1743	4 February 1752 husband's accession	9 February 1759		Louis Philippe, Duke of Orléans
	Louise Marie Adélaïde de Bourbon	Louis Jean Marie, Duke of Penthièvre (Bourbon)	13 March 1753	8 May 1768	18 November 1785 husband's accession	6 November 1793 husband's execution	23 June 1821	Philippe, Duke of Orléans
	Maria Amalia of Naples and Sicily	Ferdinand I of the Two Sicilies (Two Sicilies)	26 April 1782	25 November 1809		9 August 1830 became Queen consort	24 March 1866	Louis Philippe I
	Victoria of Saxe-Coburg and Gotha	Prince Ferdinand of Saxe-Coburg and Gotha (Wettin)	14 February 1822	27 April 1840		10 December 1857		Prince Louis
Picture	Name	Father	Birth	Marriage	Became Duchess	Ceased to be Duchess	Death	Spouse
