= La Côte-Saint-Didier =

- Commune
- Location of La Côte-Saint-Didier
- Location within France Location within Auvergne-Rhône-Alpes
- Coordinates: 45°47′39″N 3°50′45″E
- Country: France
- Region: Auvergne-Rhône-Alpes
- Department: Loire
- Arrondissement: Montbrison
- Canton: Boën-sur-Lignon
- Intercommunality: CA Loire Forez

Government
  - Mayor (2025–2026): Elodie Thevenet
- Area^{1}: 31.86 km^{2} (12.30 sq mi)
- Highest elevation: 1,267 m (4,157 ft)
- Lowest elevation: 457 m (1,499 ft)
- Population (2023): 520
  - Density: 16/km^{2} (42/sq mi)
- Time zone: UTC+01:00 (CET)
  - Summer (DST): UTC+02:00 (CEST)
- INSEE/Postal code: 42217 /42111
- ^{1} French Land Register data, which excludes lakes, ponds, glaciers > 1 km^{2} (0.386 sq mi or 247 acres) and river estuaries.

La Côte-Saint-Didier (French pronunciation: [la kot sɛ̃ didje]) is a commune in the Loire department in central France. It was formed on 1 January 2025, with the merger of Saint-Didier-sur-Rochefort and La Côte-en-Couzan.

== See also ==
- Communes of the Loire department
