= La Côte-en-Couzan =

- Part of La Côte-Saint-Didier
- Location of La Côte-en-Couzan
- Location within France Location within Auvergne-Rhône-Alpes
- Coordinates: 45°47′03″N 3°50′48″E
- Country: France
- Region: Auvergne-Rhône-Alpes
- Department: Loire
- Arrondissement: Montbrison
- Canton: Boën-sur-Lignon
- Commune: La Côte-Saint-Didier
- Area^{1}: 9.11 km^{2} (3.52 sq mi)
- Elevation: 800 m (2,600 ft)
- Highest elevation: 1,267 m (4,157 ft)
- Lowest elevation: 702 m (2,303 ft)
- Population (2022): 62
  - Density: 6.8/km^{2} (18/sq mi)
- Time zone: UTC+01:00 (CET)
  - Summer (DST): UTC+02:00 (CEST)
- Postal code: 42111
- ^{1} French Land Register data, which excludes lakes, ponds, glaciers > 1 km^{2} (0.386 sq mi or 247 acres) and river estuaries.

La Côte-en-Couzan (French pronunciation: [la kot ɑ̃ kuzɑ̃]) is a former commune in the Loire department in central France. On 1 January 2025, it was merged into the new commune of La Côte-Saint-Didier.

== Population ==
Historical population
Year	Pop.	±% p.a.
1968	108	—
1975	81	−4.03%
1982	74	−1.28%
1990	81	+1.14%
1999	83	+0.27%
2009	74	−1.14%
2014	72	−0.55%
2020	64	−1.94%
Source: INSEE

== See also ==
- Communes of the Loire department
