= Saint-Sorlin, Rhône =

Saint-Sorlin
- Part of Chabanière
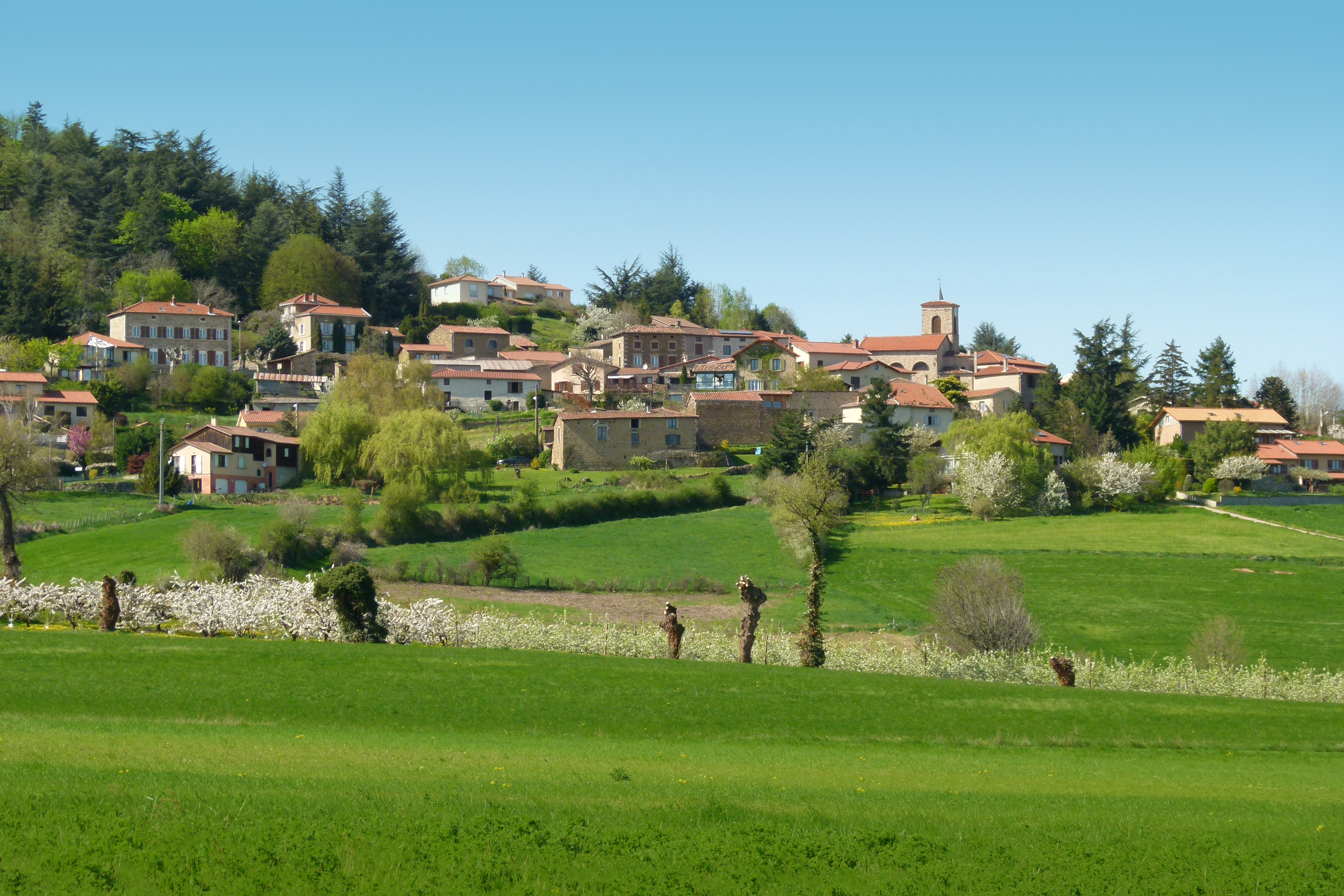
- A general view of Saint-Sorlin

- Coat of arms
- Location of Saint-Sorlin
- Location within France Location within Auvergne-Rhône-Alpes
- Coordinates: 45°37′18″N 4°38′26″E
- Country: France
- Region: Auvergne-Rhône-Alpes
- Department: Rhône
- Arrondissement: Lyon
- Canton: Mornant
- Commune: Chabanière
- Area^{1}: 4.7 km^{2} (1.8 sq mi)
- Elevation: 550 m (1,800 ft)
- Highest elevation: 808 m (2,651 ft)
- Lowest elevation: 398 m (1,306 ft)
- Population (2023): 584
  - Density: 120/km^{2} (320/sq mi)
- Time zone: UTC+01:00 (CET)
  - Summer (DST): UTC+02:00 (CEST)
- Postal code: 69440
- ^{1} French Land Register data, which excludes lakes, ponds, glaciers > 1 km^{2} (0.386 sq mi or 247 acres) and river estuaries.

Saint-Sorlin (French pronunciation: [sɛ̃ sɔʁlɛ̃]) is a former commune in the Rhône department in eastern France. On 1 January 2017, it was merged into the new commune Chabanière. Saint-Sorlin is a rural village, located southwest of Lyon and 2 km from Mornant.

== See also ==
- Communes of the Rhône department
