= Saint-Didier-sous-Riverie =

- Part of Chabanière
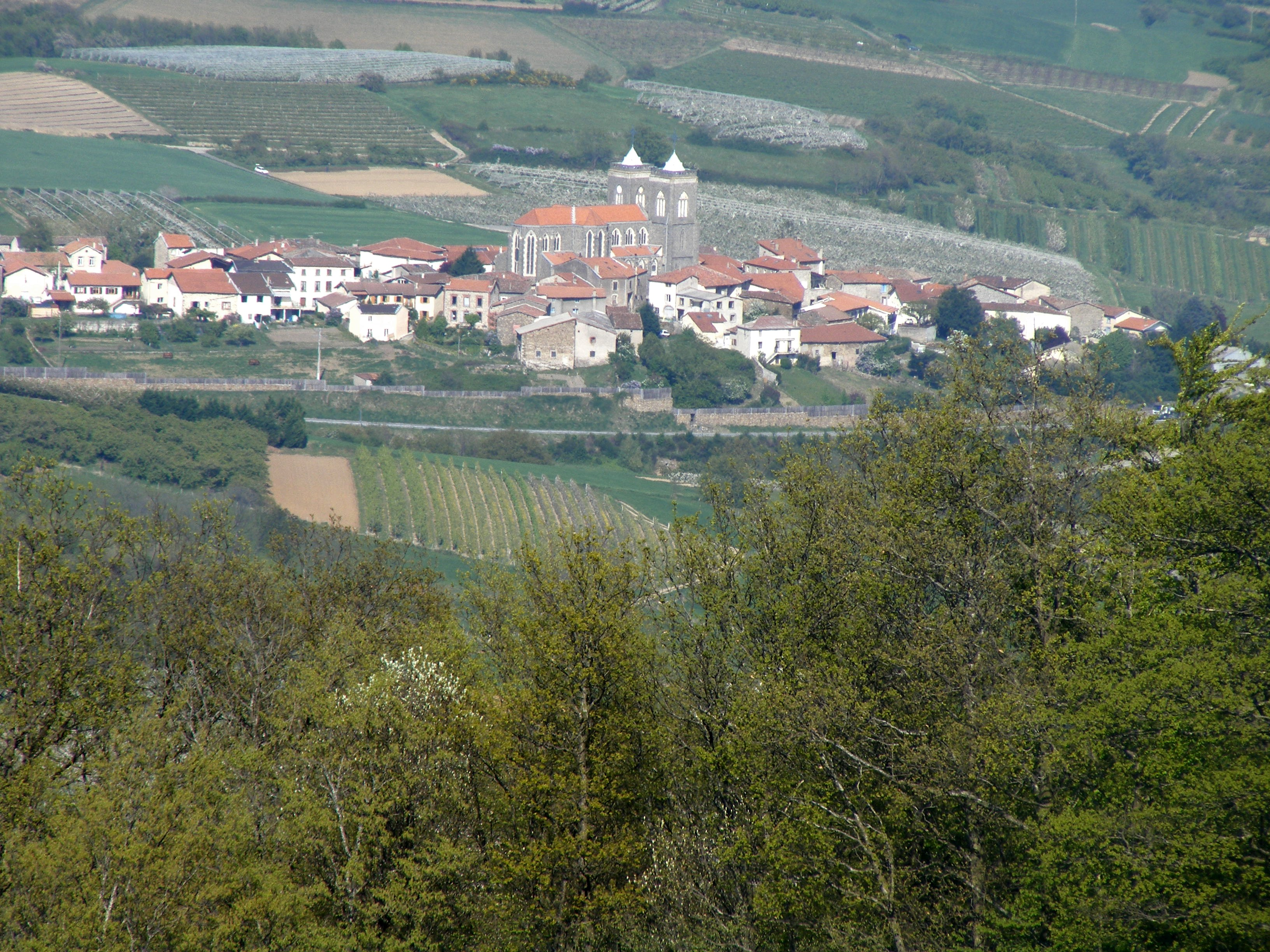
- The village of Saint-Didier-sous-Riverie in the middle of orchards.
- Location of Saint-Didier-sous-Riverie
- Location within France Location within Auvergne-Rhône-Alpes
- Coordinates: 45°35′51″N 4°36′33″E
- Country: France
- Region: Auvergne-Rhône-Alpes
- Department: Rhône
- Arrondissement: Villefranche-sur-Saône
- Canton: Mornant
- Commune: Chabanière
- Area^{1}: 13.9 km^{2} (5.4 sq mi)
- Elevation: 521 m (1,709 ft)
- Highest elevation: 750 m (2,460 ft)
- Lowest elevation: 340 m (1,120 ft)
- Population (2022): 1,281
  - Density: 92.2/km^{2} (239/sq mi)
- Time zone: UTC+01:00 (CET)
  - Summer (DST): UTC+02:00 (CEST)
- Postal code: 69440
- ^{1} French Land Register data, which excludes lakes, ponds, glaciers > 1 km^{2} (0.386 sq mi or 247 acres) and river estuaries.

Saint-Didier-sous-Riverie (French pronunciation: [sɛ̃ didje su ʁivʁi], literally Saint-Didier under Riverie; Arpitan: Sant-Dediér) is a former commune in the Rhône department in eastern France. On 1 January 2017, it was merged into the new commune Chabanière.

== See also ==
- Communes of the Rhône department
