= Louis I, Duke of Nemours =

Louis of Savoy (1615 – 16 September 1641) was Count of Geneva, Duke of Nemours, and Duke of Aumale from the death of his father Henry of Savoy in 1632 until his own death in 1641.

Louis never married. On his death, his titles passed to his brother Charles Amadeus.

French nobility
Preceded by Henry of Savoy	Duke of Nemours; 1632–1641	Succeeded by Charles Amadeus of Savoy
