= Saint-Didier-d'Allier =

- Part of Saint-Privat-d'Allier
- Location of Saint-Didier-d'Allier
- Location within France Location within Auvergne-Rhône-Alpes
- Coordinates: 44°58′15″N 3°41′32″E
- Country: France
- Region: Auvergne-Rhône-Alpes
- Department: Haute-Loire
- Arrondissement: Le Puy-en-Velay
- Canton: Saint-Paulien
- Commune: Saint-Privat-d'Allier
- Area^{1}: 7.71 km^{2} (2.98 sq mi)
- Elevation: 850 m (2,790 ft)
- Highest elevation: 1,214 m (3,983 ft)
- Lowest elevation: 622 m (2,041 ft)
- Population (2022): 48
  - Density: 6.2/km^{2} (16/sq mi)
- Time zone: UTC+01:00 (CET)
  - Summer (DST): UTC+02:00 (CEST)
- Postal code: 43580
- ^{1} French Land Register data, which excludes lakes, ponds, glaciers > 1 km^{2} (0.386 sq mi or 247 acres) and river estuaries.

Saint-Didier-d'Allier (French pronunciation: [sɛ̃ didje dalje], literally Saint-Didier of Allier; Auvergnat: Sant Desdèir d'Alèir) is a former commune in the Haute-Loire department in south-central France. On 1 January 2017, it was merged into the commune Saint-Privat-d'Allier. Its population was 48 in 2022.

== See also ==
- Communes of the Haute-Loire department
