= Saint-Laurent-Rochefort =

- Part of Solore-en-Forez
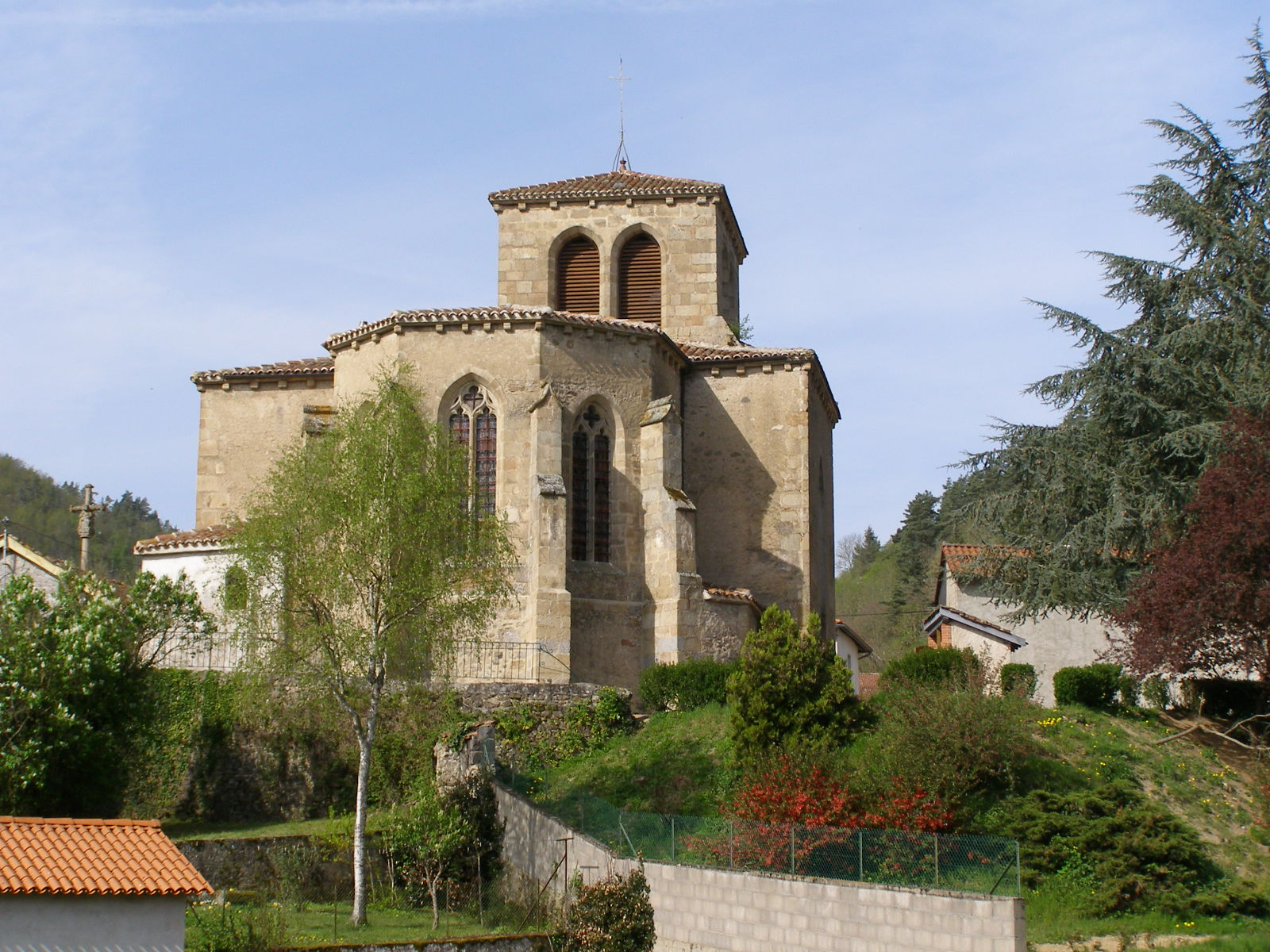

- Coat of arms
- Location of Saint-Laurent-Rochefort
- Location within France Location within Auvergne-Rhône-Alpes
- Coordinates: 45°46′28″N 3°55′27″E
- Country: France
- Region: Auvergne-Rhône-Alpes
- Department: Loire
- Arrondissement: Montbrison
- Canton: Boën-sur-Lignon
- Commune: Solore-en-Forez
- Area^{1}: 15.6 km^{2} (6.0 sq mi)
- Elevation: 450 m (1,480 ft)
- Highest elevation: 895 m (2,936 ft)
- Lowest elevation: 420 m (1,380 ft)
- Population (2022): 247
  - Density: 15.8/km^{2} (41.0/sq mi)
- Time zone: UTC+01:00 (CET)
  - Summer (DST): UTC+02:00 (CEST)
- Postal code: 42130
- ^{1} French Land Register data, which excludes lakes, ponds, glaciers > 1 km^{2} (0.386 sq mi or 247 acres) and river estuaries.

Saint-Laurent-Rochefort (French pronunciation: [sɛ̃ loʁɑ̃ ʁɔʃfɔʁ]) is a former commune in the Loire department in central France. On 1 January 2025, it was merged into the new commune of Solore-en-Forez.

== Population ==
Historical population
Year	Pop.	±% p.a.
1968	406	—
1975	312	−3.69%
1982	260	−2.57%
1990	279	+0.89%
1999	248	−1.30%
2009	256	+0.32%
2014	239	−1.36%
2020	255	+1.09%
Source: INSEE

== See also ==
- Communes of the Loire department
